= Medal "For the Defence of the Caucasus" =

Military decoration of the Soviet Union

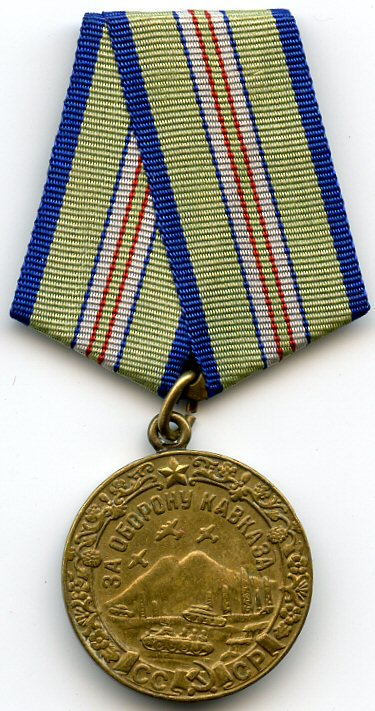
- Medal "For the Defence of the Caucasus" (obverse)
- Type: Campaign medal
- Awarded for: Participation in the defence of the Caucasus
- Presented by: USSR
- Eligibility: Citizens of the Soviet Union
- Status: No longer awarded
- Established: May 1, 1944

Highlights
- Total: 870,000
- Ribbon of the Medal "For the Defence of the Caucasus"

Precedence
- Next (higher): Medal "For the Defence of Kiev"
- Next (lower): Medal "For the Defence of the Soviet Transarctic"

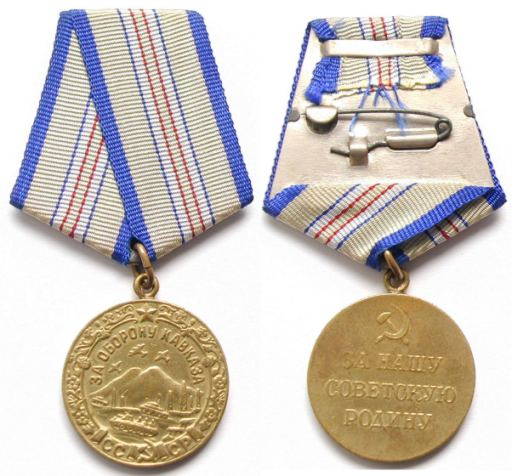
Obverse and reverse sides of the Medal "For the Defence of the Caucasus"

The Medal "For the Defence of the Caucasus" (Russian: Медаль «За оборону Кавказа») was a World War II campaign medal of the Soviet Union.

== Medal history ==
The Medal "For the Defence of the Caucasus" was established on May 1, 1944, by decree of the Presidium of the Supreme Soviet of the USSR. Its statute was modified by multiple resolutions of the Presidium of the Supreme Soviet of the USSR, on May 16, 1944, June 2, 1944, June 5, 1944, March 10, 1945, March 15, 1945, and lastly by decree No. 2523-X of the Presidium of the Supreme Soviet of the USSR of July 18, 1980.

== Medal statute ==
The Medal "For the Defence of the Caucasus" was awarded to all participants in the defence of the Caucasus - soldiers of the Red Army, sailors of the Navy, troops of the NKVD, as well as persons from the civilian population who took part in the defence of the Caucasus during the battle for the Caucasus.

Award of the medal was made on behalf of the Presidium of the Supreme Soviet of the USSR on the basis of documents attesting to actual participation in the defence of the Caucasus issued by the unit commander, the chief of the military medical establishment or by a relevant provincial or municipal authority of the Stavropol or of the Krasnodar Soviets of People's Deputies, of the Supreme Soviet of the Georgian SSR, of the Azerbaijan SSR, of the North Ossetian ASSR or of the Kabardin ASSR. Serving military personnel received the medal from their unit commander, retirees from military service received the medal from a regional, municipal or district military commissioner in the recipient's community, members of the civilian population, participants in the defence of the Caucasus received their medal from regional or city Councils of People's Deputies of the Stavropol and Krasnodar territories Soviets of Workers' Deputies, from the Supreme Soviet of the Georgian SSR, of the Azerbaijan SSR, of the North Ossetian Autonomous Soviet Socialist Republic or from the Kabardin ASSR. For the defenders who died in battle or prior to the establishment of the medal, it was awarded posthumously to the family.

The statute of the Medal "For the Defence of the Caucasus" was amended to include members of the civilian population of the Dagestan ASSR, of the Grozny Region, of the Armenian SSR and of the Rostov region as eligible recipients for their participation in the defence of the Caucasus.

The Medal "For the Defence of the Caucasus" was worn on the left side of the chest and in the presence of other awards of the USSR, was located immediately after the Medal "For the Defence of Kiev". If worn in the presence or Orders or medals of the Russian Federation, the latter have precedence.

== Medal description ==
The Medal "For the Defence of the Caucasus" was a 32mm in diameter circular brass medal with a raised rim. On the obverse in the center, the relief image of Mount Elbrus, at its foot, oil derricks and a group of three tanks moving to the left; over the mountains, three aircraft flying towards the left. A 3mm wide band covered with relief images of clusters of grapes and flowers went around the entire circumference of the medal, at the very top, a relief five pointed star, at the bottom, a scroll with the relief inscription "SSSR" (Russian: «СССР») bisected by the image of the hammer and sickle. On the reverse near the top, the relief image of the hammer and sickle, below the image, the relief inscription in three rows "FOR OUR SOVIET MOTHERLAND" (Russian: «ЗА НАШУ СОВЕТСКУЮ РОДИНУ»). The Medal "For the Defence of the Caucasus" was secured by a ring through the medal suspension loop to a standard Soviet pentagonal mount covered by a 24mm wide olive green silk moiré ribbon with 2.5mm wide blue edge stripes, in the middle, two 2mm wide white stripes bordered by 1mm blue and red stripes separated by a 2mm olive stripe.

== Notable recipients ==
- Marshal of the Soviet Union Kliment Yefremovich Voroshilov
- Admiral of the Fleet Nikolay Gerasimovich Kuznetsov
- Marshal of the Soviet Union Georgy Konstantinovich Zhukov
- Soviet Armenian composer Aram Ilyich Khachaturian
- Marshal of Aviation Alexander Ivanovich Pokryshkin
- Marshal of the Soviet Union Rodion Yakovlevich Malinovsky
- Marshal of the Soviet Union Andrei Antonovich Grechko
- Admiral of the Fleet Sergey Georgiyevich Gorshkov
- Army General Ivan Yefimovich Petrov
- Marshal of the Soviet Union Vasily Ivanovich Petrov
- Army General Ivan Vladimirovich Tyulenev
- Senior Lieutenant Anna Alexandrovna Timofeyeva-Yegorova
- Colonel General Yakov Timofeyevich Cherevichenko
- Admiral of the Fleet Hovhannes Stepani Isakov
- Captain Mariya Ivanivna Dolina
- Major Natalya Fyodorovna Meklin
- Major Polina Vladimirovna Gelman
- Captain 3rd grade Michael Petrovich Tsiselsky
- Major Raul–Yuri Georgievich Ervier
- War correspondent Pyotr Andreyevich Pavlenko
- Musician Bahram Meshadi Suleyman oglu Mansurov
- Senior lieutenant Khiuaz Dospanova
- Lieutenant colonel of the reserve Rufina Gasheva
- Senior Lieutenant Maguba Syrtlanova
- Captain Shovkat Salimova
- Scientist Sona Akhundova-Bagirbekova
- Sergeant Shabsa Mashkautsan, Hero of the Soviet Union

== See also ==
- Awards and decorations of the Soviet Union
- Great Patriotic War 1941-45
