= Valentina Stupina =

Soviet-Russian fighter pilot (1920–1943)

Valentina Sergeevna Stupina
- Валентина Сергеевна Ступина
- Born: 4 June 1920; Stavropol-on-Volga, Russian SFSR
- Died: 22 August 1943 (aged 23); Yessentuki, Soviet Union
- Military career
- Allegiance: Soviet Union
- Branch: Soviet Air Force
- Service years: 1941–1943
- Rank: Junior Lieutenant
- Units: 588th Night Bomber Regiment (later renamed the 46th Taman Guards Night Bomber Regiment)
- Conflicts: World War II; Eastern Front (DOW)
- Awards: Medal "For Courage"

Valentina Sergeevna Stupina (Russian: Валентина Сергеевна Ступина; 4 June 1920 – 22 August 1943) was a Soviet-Russian pilot, flight navigator, and the head of communications of the 588th Night Bomber Regiment during World War II until her death in 1943, after which her role was taken over by Khiuaz Dospanova.

== Early life ==
Valentina Stupina was born on 4 June 1920 in Stavropol-on-Volga (now Tolyatti), the middle of three children. Her father, who worked in forestry died in 1933 before she moved to Samara with her older brother Anatoli where she first learned to parachute. After living in Samara for a year she moved to Stavropol where she was active in sports and graduated from secondary school with honors in 1937, after which she entered the Moscow Aviation Institute where she studied until the German invasion of the Soviet Union in 1941. After the start of the war she left school to work digging anti-tank ditches and constructing defensive fortifications.

== Military career ==
After being encouraged by the Komsomol to join the women's aviation regiment founded by Marina Raskova, Stupina volunteered in October. After navigation training at Engels Military Aviation School she was deployed to the Southern Front in late May 1942. Stupina flew 15 sorties before she was appointed to be the regiment's head of communications, even though she expressed that she would rather continue flying combat sorties.

She was awarded the Medal "For Courage" in November 1942 becoming one of the first members of the regiment to receive the award. She died in a field hospital of either injuries or illness in 1943, after refusing to stay in the hospital for very long because she wanted to stay in the regiment. The entire regiment participated in her funeral and she was buried with full military honors in a local civilian cemetery. The regimental commander, Yevdokia Bershanskaya, sent her mother Polina Stupina a telegram informing her of Valentina's death but she did not arrive until after the burial. Bershanskaya met her at the train station and went to the cemetery with her.

== See also ==
- Irina Rakobolskaya
- Khiuaz Dospanova
