= Larisa Rozanova =

Soviet pilot (1918–1997)

Larisa Nikolayevna Rozanova
- Лариса Николаевна Розанова
- Born: 6 December 1918; Kiev, Ukrainian People's Republic
- Died: 5 October 1997 (aged 79); Moscow, Russia
- Military career
- Allegiance: Soviet Union
- Branch: Soviet Air Force
- Service years: 1942–1945
- Rank: Guard Captain
- Unit: 46th Taman Guards Night Bomber Aviation Regiment
- Conflicts: World War II; Eastern Front
- Awards: Hero of the Soviet Union

Larisa Nikolayevna Rozanova (Russian: Лариса Николаевна Розанова; Litvinova after marriage; 6 December 1918 – 5 October 1997) was a Soviet pilot and later the senior navigator of the 46th Taman Guards Night Bomber Aviation Regiment, nicknamed the "Night Witches" during World War II. For successfully completing 793 sorties, she was declared a Hero of the Soviet Union on 23 February 1948.

== Civilian life ==
Rozanova was born on 6 December 1918 in the city of Kiev, Ukrainian People's Republic to a Ukrainian family. Her father was employed at an aircraft plant; she would often visit the facility and observe the aircraft.

After graduating from high school, she worked at a shoe factory before entering flight school at the Kiev aeroclub. She went on to graduate from the Kherson Aviation School to become a flight instructor; she went on to teach cadets in Feodosia and the Kirov flight club in Moscow.

She became a member of the Communist Party in 1942.

== Military career ==
Not long after the start of World War II, Rozanova attempted to enlist in the military, but her request was denied. On 1 August 1941, the aviation school in Moscow where she worked was evacuated and relocated to Ryazan Oblast. Again she requested to join the military and fight on the front lines, which was again denied. In October, she and several friends who had also tried to enlist were summoned to the Osoaviahim council in Moscow, where they were informed of an all-female aviation regiment founded by Marina Raskova. The women who were admitted to the three regiments were trained at Engels.

Upon arriving at Engels, she was assigned into the navigators group; she repeatedly appealed to be a pilot, not a navigator, but as her aviation background included some navigation training and given the lack of certified female navigators, Raskova wanted her to serve as a navigator. After having a conversation with Raskova, Rozanova eventually changed her mind and withdrew her appeals. Before the war, navigation training took over a year but due to the state of the war at the time, it only lasted six months. She graduated from Engels in 1942 and was appointed a squadron navigator in the 588th Night Bomber Regiment, which was renamed in October 1943 to the 46th Taman Guards Night Bomber Aviation Regiment.

On 27 May 1942, she was deployed to the Eastern front. During the regiment's first sortie she navigated for Serafima Amosova, following the plane with Yevdokia Bershanskaya and Sofya Burzayeva. In December, she was allowed to become a pilot and promoted to the rank of flight commander; in April 1943, she was assigned to ferry aircraft from the frontline to repair stations in Armavir, where she met her future husband Ilya Litvinov.

Throughout March to September 1943, she participated in the operation to breach the Kuban bridgehead in the Taman Peninsula. In November 1943, after success in the Taman offensive, the regiment moved to the Kerch Peninsula and she participated in the Crimean and Sevastopol offensives. On 24 December 1943, a shell fragment hit the plane Rozanova was in, piloted by Maria Olkhovskaya. Despite losing altitude quickly, they managed to land safely. After the death of Senior Lieutenant Yevgeniya Rudneva in the battle of Crimea in April 1944, Rozanova became the senior navigator of the regiment. She made a total of 793 sorties, having participated in bombing campaigns in the North Caucasus, Stavropol, Kuban, Novorossiysk, Crimea, Kuban, Kerch, Belorussia, Poland, and Germany.

Rozanova was demobilized from active duty in 1945 after the end of the war and stayed in the reserve.

== Later life ==
Rozanova was nominated for the title of Hero of the Soviet Union in 1945, but was initially awarded Order of Lenin instead in 1946. The nomination was reevaluated in 1948, and on 23 February 1948 she was officially declared a Hero of the Soviet Union.

After the war, she and her husband, Ilya Litvinov, lived in Moscow and had a son, Sergey. She worked as a senior engineer at the All-Russian Institute of Power Sources until she retired in 1979. On 5 October 1997 she died at the age of 79 and was buried in the Nikolo-Arkhangelsk cemetery.

== Awards ==
- Hero of the Soviet Union (23 February 1948)
- Two Orders of Lenin (15 May 1946 and 23 February 1948)
- Two Orders of the Red Banner (30 October 1943 and 7 March 1945)
- Two Orders of the Patriotic War 1st Class (26 April 1944 and 11 March 1985)
- Order of the Red Star (9 September 1942)
- campaign and jubilee medals

== See also ==
- List of female Heroes of the Soviet Union
- Polikarpov Po-2
