= Serafima Amosova =

Deputy Regimental Commander of the 46th Guards Night Bomber Aviation Regiment

Serafima Tarasovna Amosova
- Серафима Тарасовна Амосова
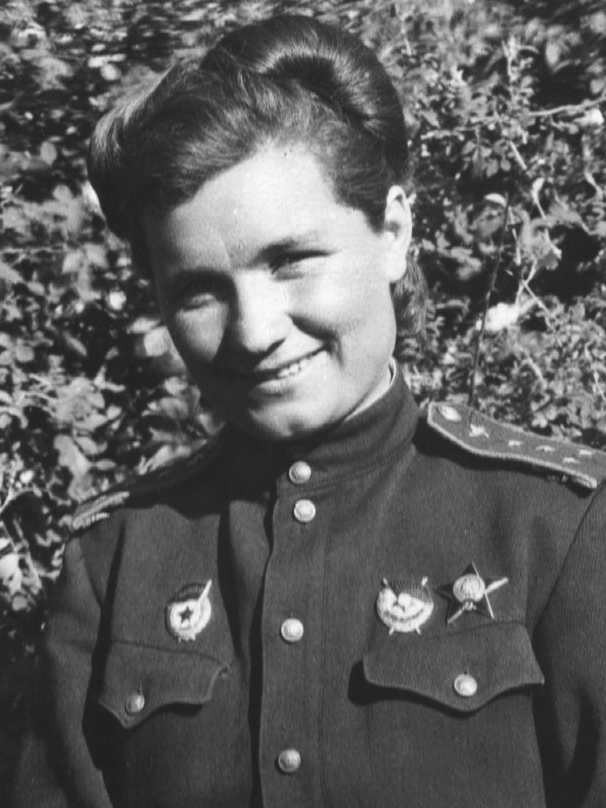
- Born: 20 August 1914; Chernorechenskaya, Krasnoyarsk Krai, Siberia
- Died: 17 December 1992 (aged 78); Moscow, Russian Federation
- Spouse: Ivan Taranenko
- Military career
- Allegiance: Soviet Union
- Branch: Soviet Air Force
- Service years: 1942–1948
- Rank: Major
- Unit: 46th Guards Night Bomber Aviation Regiment
- Conflicts: World War II; Eastern Front
- Awards: Order of the Red Banner

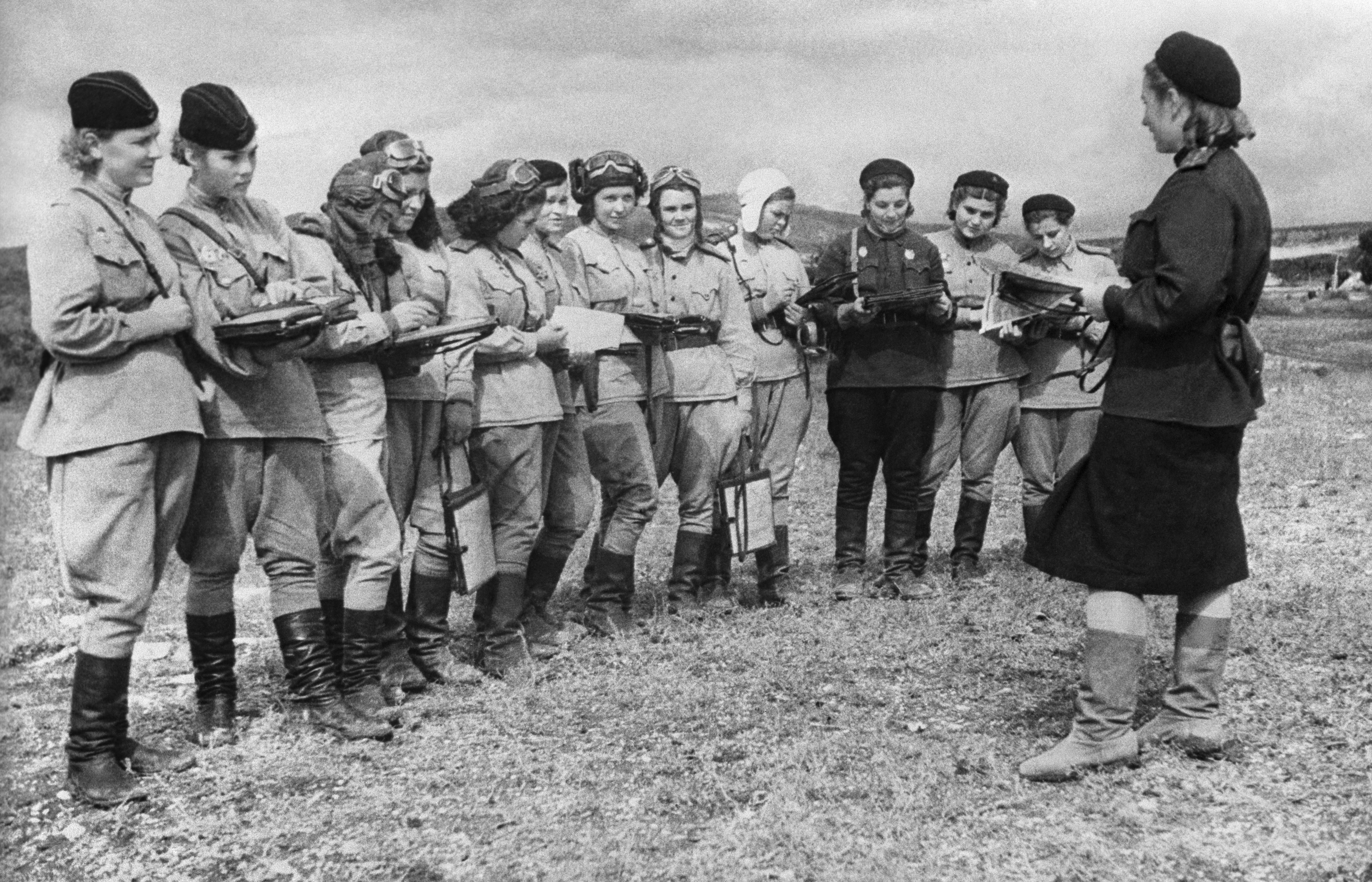
Asimova (far right) assigns missions to members of the 46th Guards Night Bomber Regiment (the famous "Night Witches") in a 1943 photograph.

Serafima Tarasovna Amosova (Russian: Серафима Тарасовна Амосова; 20 August 1914 – 17 December 1992) was the deputy commander of flight operations in the 46th Guards Night Bomber Aviation Regiment during the Second World War.

== Early life ==
Amosova was born in central Siberia on 20 August 1914 to a working-class family; her father worked at the local Chernorechenskaya railway depot. Her grandfather, Anton Amosov, had moved to Siberia in the late 19th century from Byelorussia. After graduating from school in 1929 she joined the Komsomol and found work as the leader of a pioneer detachment, and in 1933 she was a delegate to the All-Union Conference of Pioneer Workers in Moscow. With dreams of becoming a pilot, she entered the OSOAVIAHIM but crashed her glider on the day she was due to graduate flight training. After recovering from her injuries she attended the Tambov Aviation School. In 1936 she graduated with honors and received her pilot's license, after she worked for Aeroflot as a pilot a Moscow - Irkutsk route, delivering mail in a Petlyakov Pe-5. After escalation of the Second World War across Europe, in January 1941 she was appointed squadron commander to train military-aged men at Yanaul Airport, Bashkortostan.

== Military career ==
Just a few days after the German invasion of the Soviet Union in 1941 Amosova and several other female instructors sent a letter requesting to be sent to the warfront. While male students were deployed to the warfront the female flight instructors were told to remain in Bashkortostan to train new cadets. After further persistence they were referred to Marina Raskova, the founder of three women's aviation regiments. After receiving that letter she immediately flew to Moscow to meet with Raskova, who accepted her into the regiment. After graduating from Engels Military Aviation School in May 1942 with the rank of lieutenant she was deployed to the Southern Front as a squadron commander in the 588th Night Bomber Regiment, later renamed as the 46th Guards Night Bomber Regiment in 1943. Being one of the most experienced pilots in the regiment, she was soon promoted to deputy commander of flight operations. During the regiment's first sortie she flew as pilot with navigator Larisa Litvinova who later became a Hero of the Soviet Union, carefully following the plane of regimental commander Yevdokiya Bershanskaya and navigator Sofiya Burzaeva.

On one mission when Amosova was flying as pilot to bomb an Axis headquarters, she delayed dropping her bombs because of the lack of anti-aircraft fire when she flew over the target, having expected anti-aircraft fire from such an important target. Suspecting they were over the wrong location she flew back to an aerial checkpoint and made another approach but was again met by a lack of anti-aircraft fire. Shocked that such an important target for bombing would not be protected by antiaircraft artillery, she returned to the checkpoint again and made a third approach, after which they released the bombs and waiting to see if there would be any counterattacks. Only after dropping the bombs did the Axis launch anti-aircraft fire, likely because they did not want to indicate the position of the target.

She made a total of 555 sorties in the war, having participated in night bombing campaigns in the North Caucasus, Stavropol, Kuban, Novorossiysk, Crimea, Kuban, Kerch, Belarus and Poland as well as airdropping supplies for amphibious landings and conducting daylight flights in search of areas to use as airfields.

== Later life ==
Not long after the end of the war, she married fellow airforce pilot Ivan Taranenko and took his surname. For a while they lived in Ashkabad, which was devastated by an earthquake in 1948 and resulted in the death of their daughter. Together the couple raised three sons, and all of them grew up to work in aviation or serve in the military. She worked as a magazine editor and spoke to youth about patriotism. She died in Moscow on 17 December 1992.

== Awards ==
- Order of the Red Banner (2)
- Order of Alexander Nevsky
- Order of the Patriotic War 2nd class (2)
- Order of the Red Star
- campaign and jubilee medals

== See also ==
- Yevdokiya Bershanskaya
- Yevdokiya Rachkevich
