= Polina Makogon =

Squadron commander in the "night witches"

- Полина Александровна Макогон
- Born: 1919; Balky, Ukraine
- Died: 1 April 1943 (aged 23–24); Krasnodar, USSR
- Military career
- Allegiance: Soviet Union
- Branch: Soviet Air Force
- Service years: 1941–1943
- Rank: Lieutenant
- Unit: 46th Guards Night Bomber Aviation Regiment
- Conflicts: World War II
- Awards: Order of the Red Banner; Order of the Patriotic War

Polina Aleksandrovna Makogon (Russian: Поли́на Алекса́ндровна Макого́н; Ukrainian: Поліна Олександрівна Макогон, romanized: Polina Oleksandrivna Makohon; 1919 – 1943) was a squadron commander in an all-female Soviet air unit, the 46th Guards Night Bomber Aviation Regiment, also known as the Night Witches.

== Biography ==
Makogon was born in 1919 in the village of Balky, located in what it now the Zaporizhia Oblast of Ukraine.

== Career ==
In 1941, she joined the Civil Air Fleet and in May 1942 she graduated from the Engels Military School. She was a responsible pilot and at the time of her death was the Commander of the 3rd Squadron, 46th Guards Night Bomber Aviation Regiment, within the 325th Night Bomber Aviation Division, part of the 4th Air Army. She trained many pilots, including Meri Avidzba, who carried out three attacks with Makogon in February 1943. During her time in service she participated in the Battle of the Caucasus, the Liberation of Kuban and bombed enemy facilities. Missions were dangerous, and navigator Yevgenia Zhigulenko recalled several near misses when she crewed with Makogon, including one instance where it was Makogon's actions that averted a crash. On the night of the 31 March/1 April 1943, Makogon was piloting a bomber back to base when it collided with another aircraft. Of the four people in the aircraft involved in the crash, only Khiuaz Dospanova (from the other plane) survived. Later Zhigulenko suggested that the inexperience of the new navigator, Lydia Svistunova, may have had an effect.

Makogon was buried in the village of Pashkovskaya, now a district of the city of Krasnodar. She was posthumously awarded the Order of the Patriotic War, 1st class.

== Legacy ==
In 1965 a memorial obelisk was erected in Pashkovskaya to remember Makogon and other pilots.
