= Yevdokiya Pasko =

Soviet aviator and Hero of the Soviet Union (1919–2017)

Yevdokiya Borisovna Pasko
- Евдокия Борисовна Пасько
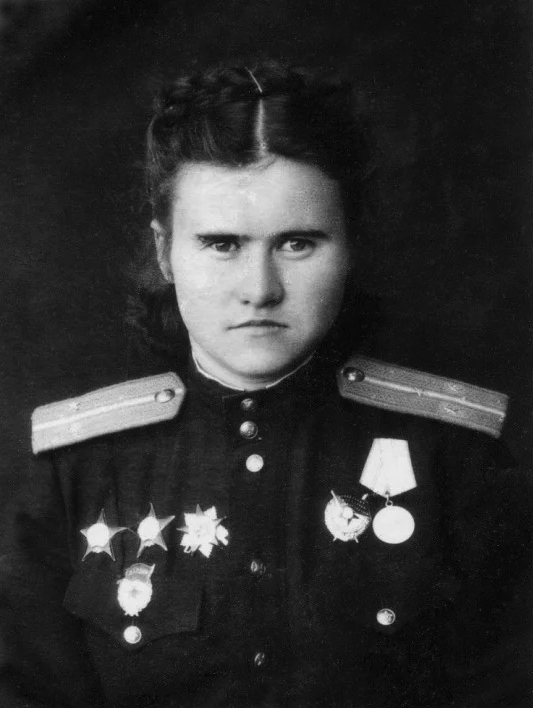
- Born: 30 December 1919; Lipenko village, Jeti-Ögüz District, Semirechye Oblast, Turkestan ASSR (located within present day Issyk Kul Region, Kyrgyzstan)
- Died: 27 January 2017 (aged 97); Moscow, Russia
- Military career
- Allegiance: Soviet Union
- Branch: Soviet Air Force
- Service years: 1941–1945
- Rank: Senior lieutenant
- Unit: 46th Taman Guards Night Bomber Aviation Regiment
- Awards: Hero of the Soviet Union

Yevdokiya Borisovna Pasko (Russian: Евдокия Борисовна Пасько; 30 December 1919 – 27 January 2017) was a squadron navigator in the Soviet all-female 46th Taman Guards Night Bomber Aviation Regiment during World War II. For her successes in the war, she was honored with the title of Hero of the Soviet Union on 26 October 1944.

== Early life ==
Pasko was born in Lipenko village, Jeti-Ögüz District, Semirechye Oblast on 30 December 1919 to family of Ukrainian peasant immigrants; she was the youngest of twelve children. Having demonstrated a talent for mathematics from a young age, she went on to attend secondary school in Barnaul from 1936 to 1937 before returning to her native village to complete her tenth grade of schooling in 1938. Her family then decided to send her to Moscow to continue her studies, and later that year she was enrolled in the Faculty of Mechanics and Mathematics of Moscow State University. In October 1941 during her fourth semester at the school, she and some of her classmates volunteered to join the women's aviation group founded by Marina Raskova.

== Military career ==
After completing initial training at Engels Military Aviation School in February 1942 she was assigned to the 588th Night Bomber Aviation Regiment, with which she was deployed to the warfront in May 1942 initially as a shooter-bombardier. Soon after her arrival on the warfront she was promoted to the position of flight navigator, and eventually she became squadron navigator for squadron No.3, where she was tasked with navigating for squadron commander Mariya Smirnova. In February 1943 the regiment received the Guards designation and was renamed as the 46th Guards Night Bomber Aviation Regiment. During the war, she flew bombing missions against the Axis in Belarus, Berlin, Crimea, the Caucasus, the Kerch peninsula, Kuban, and Poland, often though extreme weather and heavy anti-aircraft fire. In total, she made approximately 790 sorties in the Polikarpov Po-2 during the war. In addition to her flight duties she helped train seven new navigators in the regiment.

== Civilian life ==
After the war, Pasko returned to her studies and graduated with a Ph.D. in mathematics and married her colleague Boris Malyshev. She taught for over forty years at Bauman Moscow State Technical University. She died on 27 January 2017 in Moscow and was buried at the Troyekurovskoye Cemetery.

== Awards and honors ==
- Hero of the Soviet Union (26 October 1944)
- Order of Lenin (26 October 1944)
- Order of the Red Banner (5 May 1943)
- Two Orders of the Patriotic War 1st Class (30 October 1943 and 11 March 1985)
- Order of Friendship of Peoples (27 November 1980)
- Two Orders of the Red Star (9 September 1980 and 26 April 1944)
- campaign and jubilee medals

== See also ==
- List of female Heroes of the Soviet Union
- Yevgeniya Rudneva
- Polina Gelman
