= Peshkovskaya =

Peshkovskaya Пешковская
- Village
- Location within Vologda Oblast Location within Russia
- Coordinates: 59°56′N 41°09′E
- Country: Russia
- Region: Vologda Oblast
- District: Syamzhensky District
- Time zone: UTC+3:00

Peshkovskaya (Russian: Пешковская) is a rural locality (a village) in Zhityovskoye Rural Settlement, Syamzhensky District, Vologda Oblast, Russia. The population was 28 as of 2002.

== Geography ==
Peshkovskaya is located 12 km southeast of Syamzha (the district's administrative centre) by road. Yakovlevskaya is the nearest rural locality.

In 1965 a memorial obelisk was erected in Pashkovskaya to remember the night witch Polina Makogon and other pilots.
