= Mariya Smirnova =

Soviet Air Force hero

Mariya Vasilyevna Smirnova
- Мария Васильевна Смирнова
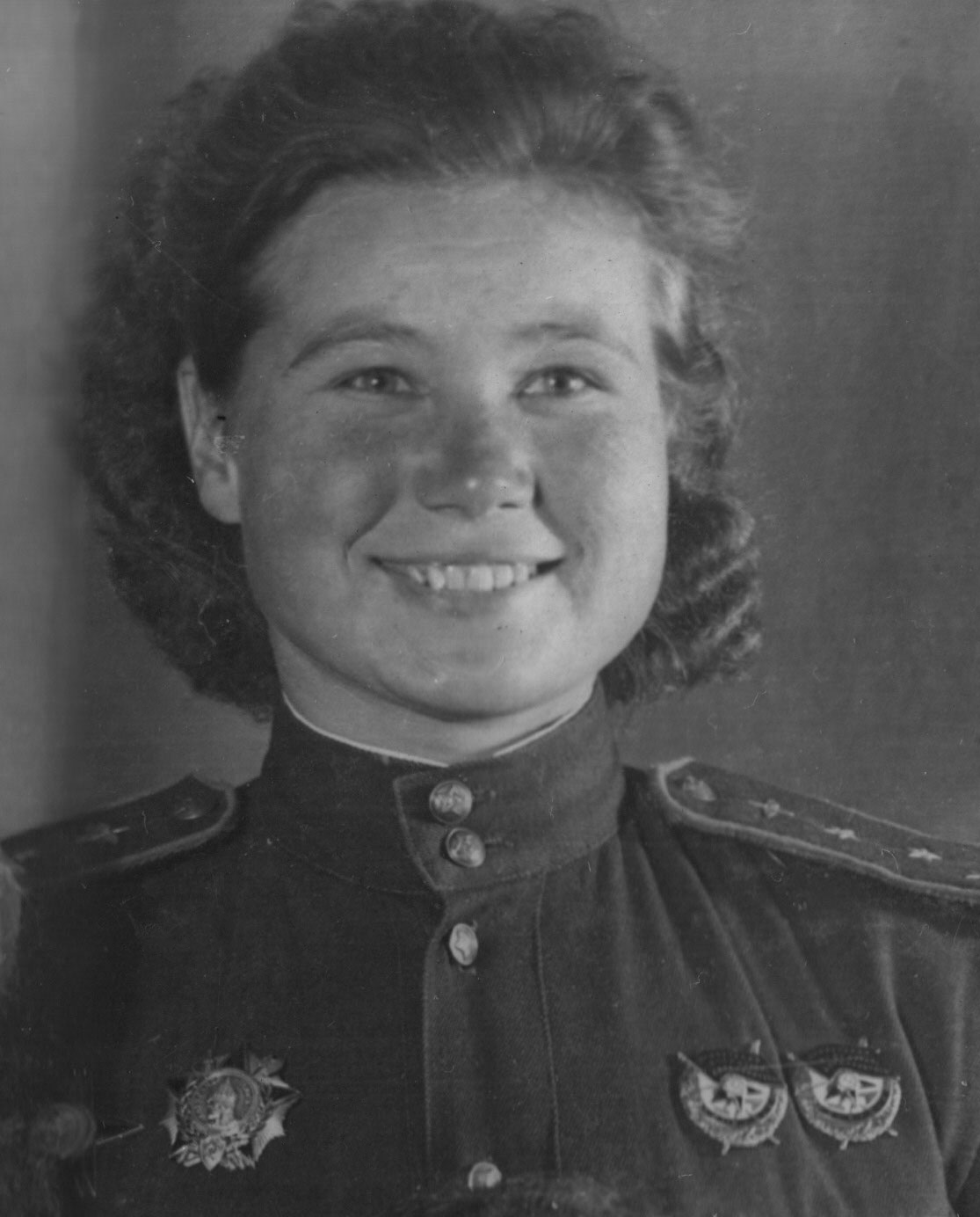
- Born: 31 March 1920; Vorobyovo village, Tver Governorate, Russian SFSR
- Died: 10 July 2002 (aged 82); Tver, Russia
- Military career
- Allegiance: Soviet Union
- Branch: Soviet Air Force
- Service years: 1941–1945
- Rank: Major
- Unit: 46th Taman Guards Night Bomber Aviation Regiment
- Conflicts: World War II
- Awards: Hero of the Soviet Union

Mariya Vasilyevna Smirnova (Russian: Мария Васильевна Смирнова; 31 March 1920 – 10 July 2002) was a squadron commander in the 46th Taman Guards Night Bomber Aviation Regiment (nicknamed the "Night Witches") of the Soviet Air Forces during the Second World War. For her actions during the war, she was made a Hero of the Soviet Union on 26 October 1944.

== Early life ==
Smirnova was born on 31 March 1920 to a Karelian peasant family in Vorobyovo village. After attending a school in her village until the age of thirteen she moved to the city of Kalinin (Tver), where she studied at the Likhoslavl Pedagogical School for three years, graduating in 1936 before she briefly worked as a schoolteacher in Polyuzhye. She then moved to Kalinin, where she trained at the local aeroclub in addition to teaching kindergarten. Soon after graduating from flight training in 1939 as the only female cadet in her class, she stopped working as a schoolteacher in March 1940 to become a full-time flight instructor at the aeroclub.

== World War II ==
Several months after the German invasion of the Soviet Union, Smirnova volunteered to join the women's aviation group founded by Marina Raskova. After completing initial training at Engels Military Aviation School in February 1942 she was assigned to the 588th Night Bomber Aviation Regiment, with which she was deployed to the warfront in May 1942 as a deputy squadron commander; the unit was renamed in February 1943 as the 46th Guards Night Bomber Regiment. Later she was promoted to the position of squadron commander in August 1943, a position she took very seriously. There, she quickly developed a reputation for maintaining strict discipline among her subordinates. On 22 September 1943 she became the first member of the regiment to total 500 sorties; earlier that month she was nominated for the title Hero of the Soviet Union for having completed 441 sorties, but the nomination was rejected and she was eventually awarded the Order of Alexander Nevsky instead, making her and her comrade Yevdokiya Nikulina (a fellow squadron commander who also received the award on the same date) the first women awarded it. Less than a year later in August 1944 she was nominated for the title again for totaling 805 sorties, resulting in the awarding of the title on 26 October 1944. By the end of the war she totaled 935 sorties on the Po-2, dropping 118 tons of bombs on enemy targets.

== Civilian life ==
In March 1945, Bershanskaya sent Smirnova and her comrade Ryabova to visit the Zhukovsky Air Force Academy, but neither attended after the head of the school strongly discouraged them from attending and told them that they should seek civilian careers instead. After the regiment was disbanded in October 1945 she left the military, having been declared unfit for remaining a pilot by a medical commission. Soon she married a fellow veteran, navigator Nikolai Lyubimov. The couple had two daughters – Natalya and Tatyana. Upon graduating from the Tambov Party School in 1954 she briefly worked as a political instructor for the Tambov party committee propaganda department before moving on to the Poshekhonye-Volodarsky district party committee, where she remained until 1955. After moving to Kalinin (Tver) in 1956 she initially worked as head of a kindergarten before taking a job at the regional party committee. She later briefly worked as an engineer at the personnel department of the Kalinin Economic Council, but after all economic councils were disbanded in the USSR she worked as the head of the personnel department of a factory until 1972. In addition to being a member of the Communist Party she was a member of the Council of War Veterans. She died on 10 July 2002 in Tver and was buried in the Dmitrovo-Cherkassky cemetery.

== Awards ==
- Hero of the Soviet Union (26 October 1944)
- Order of Lenin (26 October 1944)
- Three Orders of the Red Banner (9 September 1942, 26 April 1944, and 15 June 1945)
- Order of Alexander Nevsky (25 October 1943)
- Order of the Patriotic War 1st class (11 March 1985)
- Order of the Red Star (27 April 1943)
- campaign and jubilee medals

== See also ==
- List of female Heroes of the Soviet Union
