= Ulyanenko =

Ulyanenko or Ulianenko (Ukrainian or Russian: Ульяненко) is a Ukraninan surname. Notable people with the name include:

- Nina Ulyanenko (1923–2005), Soviet fighter pilot, Hero of the Soviet Union
- Oles Ulianenko (1962–2010), Ukrainian writer
