= Nina Raspopova =

Nina Maksimovna Raspopova
- Нина Максимовна Распопова
- Born: 31 December [O.S. 18 December] 1913; Magdagachi, Russian Empire
- Died: 2 July 2009 (aged 95); Mytischi, Russian Federation
- Military career
- Allegiance: Soviet Union
- Branch: Soviet Air Force
- Service years: 1941–1945
- Rank: Senior Lieutenant
- Unit: 46th Taman Guards Night Bomber Aviation Regiment
- Conflicts: World War II; Eastern Front
- Awards: Hero of the Soviet Union

Nina Maksimovna Raspopova (Russian: Нина Максимовна Распопова; 31 December [O.S. 18 December] 1913 – 2 July 2009) was a pilot and flight commander in the 46th Taman Guards Night Bomber Aviation Regiment during World War II. Among many close calls with death, she twice survived being shot down in a Po-2 biplane. For her actions in the war she was awarded the title Hero of the Soviet Union on 15 May 1946.

== Civilian life ==
Raspopova was born on 31 December [O.S. 18 December] 1913 to a Russian peasant family in the city of Magdagachi in the Russian Empire. Her mother died when Nina was just ten years old, and because her father was an unskilled worker she was just fifteen years old when she started attending mining school, despite previously having worked as a cook at another mine. She graduated from the Blagoveshchensk Mining School before continuing to the Khabarovsk Flight School from which she graduated in 1933; the local Komsomol committee had offered her a chance to enroll in the flight school in 1932 after she was noticed for her ambitiousness. Eager to become a pilot, she was not deterred by the fact that she was one of only two female students in the school. Before enlisting in the military she worked as a geologist in mines in the Transbaikal area as well as working as a flight instructor in Spassk of the Far Eastern Territories and in the Omsk and Mytishchi flight clubs of Moscow. At the Omsk aeroclub where she was already an instructor she flew gliders as well as aircraft, in addition to gaining more parachuting practice; after completing advanced courses at the Central flying club she was sent to Mytishchi, and was by then a relatively experienced pilot.

== Military career ==
Raspopova joined the military in October 1941 after the German invasion of the Soviet Union. After completing training in Engels she was deployed to the Eastern front in May 1942 as part of the 588th Night Bomber Regiment, which was later awarded the Guards designation and renamed the 46th Guards Night Bomber Aviation Regiment.

On one mission in 1942 after a standard bombing attack, the Polikarpov Po-2 she was flying was hit by anti-aircraft fire from Axis forces. To avoid more fire, she maneuvered the plane into a steep dive leading Axis forces into thinking they had been shot down; when she began to increase altitude over a lake, her navigator noticed that the oil tank had been punctured from the fire. Despite the damage to the plane, both aviators survived the incident after dropping their bombs and landing at their designated airfield.

On another mission that same year her Po-2 was again hit by anti-aircraft fire, this time causing more damage to the aircraft. The fuel tank exploded and sprayed fuel over the cabin, damaged the engines, and seriously injured her navigator Larissa Radchikova. The plane landed on a minefield but all crew members were rescued by an artillery unit commissioner sent to search for them. Having sustained several injuries requiring surgery, Raspopova received surgery and returned to active duty in less than two months. During the battle for Crimea she survived another close call after being shot down again; after making an emergency landing, she almost taxied into a trench and hit an anti-tank mine, yet still managed to survive.

She participated in the bombing campaigns over the Caucasus, Belorussia, Ukraine, Crimea, Germany, and Poland. In total she completed 805 sorties, sometimes making as many as eight sorties in one night. In doing so, she dropped a total of 110 tons of bombs on her targets, which included destroying three ferries, one segment of railroad, a searchlight, an ammunition depot, six military vehicles, and repulsing three artillery battalions.

== Later life ==
Raspopova was awarded the title Hero of the Soviet Union and an Order of Lenin on 15 May 1946 for "exemplary fulfillment of commanded missions and demonstration of courage and heroism in battles against the German fascist invaders". She did not continue an aviation career after the war, but stayed in touch with many of fellow members of the regiment, remaining social and working as a secretary for a local council. She died at the age of 95 in Mytischi, Moscow on 2 July 2009.

== Awards ==
- Hero of the Soviet Union (15 May 1946)
- Order of Lenin (15 May 1946)
- Two Orders of the Red Banner (19 October 1942 and 14 December 1944)
- Three Order of the Great Patriotic War 1st class (22 February 1944, 15 June 1945, and 11 March 1985)
- Order of Friendship (7 April 1944)
- campaign, service, and jubilee medals

== See also ==
- List of female Heroes of the Soviet Union
