= Aleksandra Akimova =

Soviet Air Force officer (1922–2012)

- Александра Фёдоровна Акимова
- Akimova in 1946
- Born: 5 May 1922; Skopinsky, Ryazan Governorate, Russian SFSR
- Died: 29 December 2012 (age 90); Moscow, Russia
- Military career
- Allegiance: Soviet Union
- Branch: Soviet Air Force
- Service years: 1941−1945
- Rank: Senior lieutenant
- Unit: 46th Taman Guards Night Bomber Aviation Regiment
- Conflicts: World War II
- Awards: Hero of the Russian Federation

Aleksandra Fyodorovna Akimova (Russian: Александра Фёдоровна Акимова; 5 May 1922 – 29 December 2012) was a Soviet squadron navigator in the 46th Taman Guards Night Bomber Aviation Regiment during the Second World War. In 1994 she became one of the few women awarded the title Hero of the Russian Federation.

== Early life ==
Akimova was born on 5 May 1922 to a Russian peasant family in the village of Skopinsky within the Ryazan Governorate of the Russian SFSR. After graduating from secondary school she entered history classes at the Moscow Pedagogical Institute in addition to nursing courses. After the German invasion of the Soviet Union in 1941 she applied to enlist in the Red Army but her request was initially denied and she was sent to assist in construction of defensive fortifications around Mozhaysk.

== Military career ==
Eventually accepted into the military in October 1941, she attended an accelerated navigation course at Engels Military Aviation School in Saratov; upon graduating from the training in February 1942 she was assigned to the 588th Night Bomber Aviation Regiment, with which she was deployed to the warfront in May. Despite being trained as a navigator, she originally worked as a master of armament and later aircraft mechanic. Not satisfied with being confined to a ground crew role, Akimova asked to become a navigator for combat missions when the regiment began forming a third squadron in February 1943 after receiving the guards designation; the process of forming the new squadron included training mechanics as navigators and navigators as pilots. Her request was accepted, and after quickly completing additional navigation training she flew her first sortie as navigator in April 1943, making her one of the youngest navigators in the regiment. Despite her minimal experience as a military navigator, she nevertheless excelled in the position, and was soon promoted to the position of squadron navigator in October 1943. In addition, she helped train seven new navigators, which was not made easy by conditions on the warfront. By the end of the war Akimova made 680 combat sorties as navigator on a Po-2 biplane, for which she was nominated for the title Hero of the Soviet Union in May 1945, but the nomination was demoted to only the Order of Lenin.

== Later life ==
After the end of the war Akimova was demobilized from the military in October 1945 and she soon returned to her studies at the Moscow Pedagogical Institute. In 1952 she began teaching at the Moscow Aviation Institute, where she taught for 40 years until her retirement in 1992.

In 1994 she was awarded the title Hero of the Russian Federation for her actions in the war after her participation in the war gained attention. She was an active member of the veterans movement and participated in victory parades. She died on 29 December 2012 and was buried in the Troyekurovsky cemetery in Moscow.

== Awards and honors ==
- Hero of the Russian Federation (31 December 1994)
- Order of Lenin (15 May 1946)
- Order of the Red Banner (26 April 1944)
- Three Orders of the Patriotic War (1st class - 22 February 1945; 2nd class - 15 June 1945 and 11 March 1985)
- Order of the Red Star (22 October 1943)
- Medal "For Courage" (15 March 1943)
- campaign and jubilee medals

== See also ==
- List of Heroes of the Russian Federation
