= Irina Rakobolskaya =

Russian physicist and aviator (1919–2016)

- Ири́на Вячесла́вовна Ракобо́льская
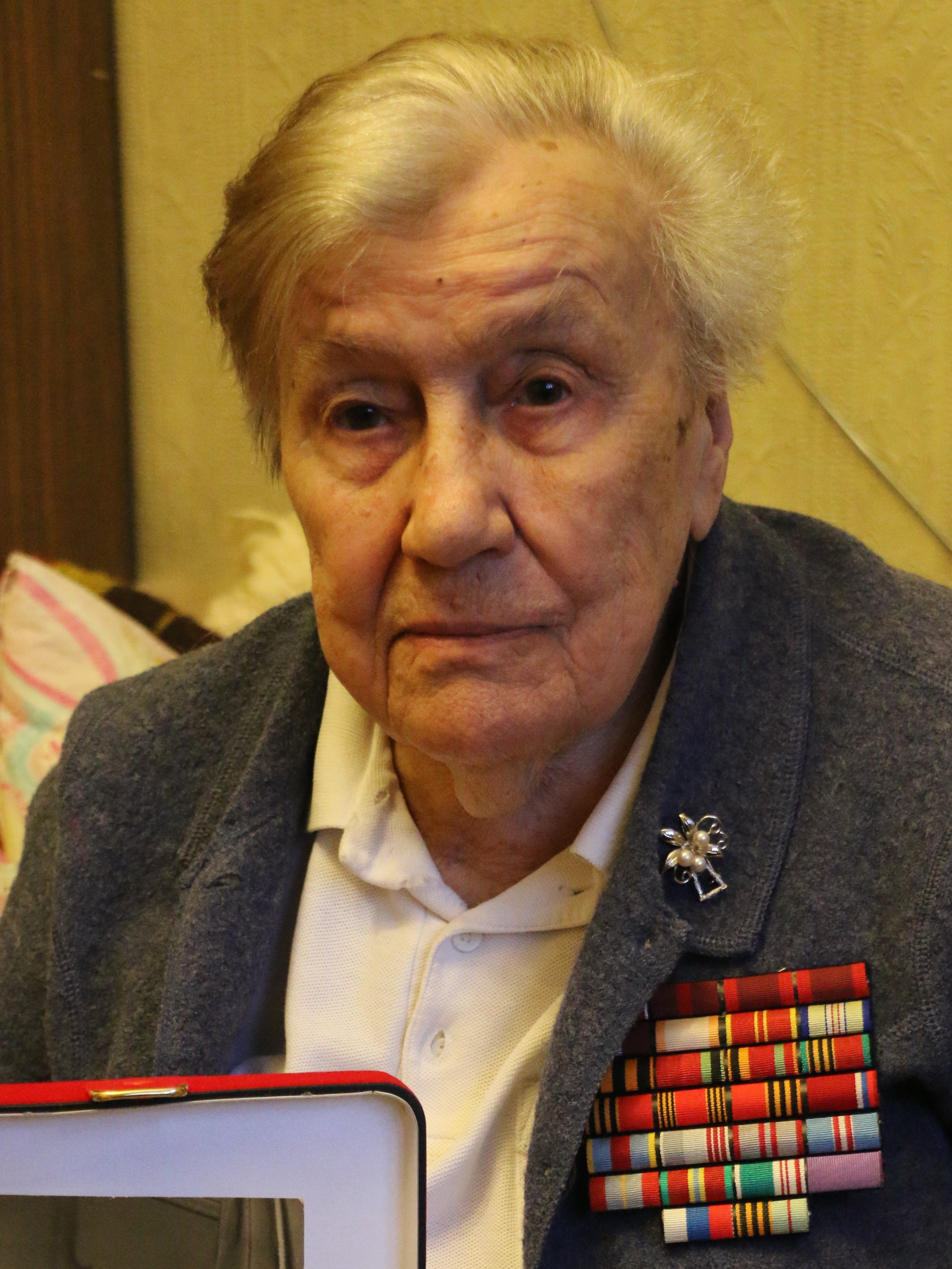
- Rakobolskaya in December 2015
- Born: 22 December 1919; Dankov, Russian SFSR
- Died: 22 September 2016 (aged 96); Moscow, Russia
- Occupation: Physicist
- Spouse: Dmitry Pavlovich Linde
- Children: Andrei Linde
- Awards: Order of the Red Banner; Honored Scientist of the Russian SFSR

Irina Vyacheslavovna Rakobolskaya (Russian: Ири́на Вячесла́вовна Ракобо́льская; 22 December 1919 – 22 September 2016) was a mathematician and physicist who served as the chief of staff of the women's 46th Taman Guards Night Bomber Aviation Regiment during World War II. After the war she worked as a physicist at Moscow State University and studied cosmic rays. She received numerous high state awards in her career and was awarded the title Honored Scientist of the Russian SFSR in 1990. She co-authored a book with Natalya Meklin-Kravtsova, an aviator from the regiment, titled We Were Called Night Witches about their experiences in the war, as their nickname given by their German opponents, Nachthexen, meant "night witches".

== Early life ==
Rakobolskaya was born in 1919 in the city of Dankov to a family of physics teachers; her father had graduated from Moscow State University with a degree in astronomy in 1910. After graduating secondary school in 1938 she enrolled in the MSU School of Physics.

== Military career ==
Rakobolskaya joined the military in October 1941 after the start of the Second World War; seventeen other students from the university also joined the 588th Night Bomber Regiment and trained at the Engels Military Aviation School, including Yevdokiya Pasko, Yekaterina Ryabova, and Yevgeniya Rudneva, who were awarded the title Hero of the Soviet Union during the war. After finishing training in 1942 she was soon appointed as the regiment's chief of staff. She had accompanied a total of 15 sorties as a navigator by the time she was demobilized with the rank of major in 1946.

== Later life and contributions to science ==
In 1946 she was demobilized from the military and finished her fourth year at the university and graduated in 1949, after defending her thesis on muons, developed under the guidance of Georgy Zatsepin and Vladimir Veksler.

From 1950 to 1963 she worked as an assistant professor, and from 1963 to 1977 as an associate professor (docent). In 1977 she became a full professor in the Department of Cosmic Rays at the Physics Department of Moscow State University.

In 1968, in conjunction with Georgy Zatsepin, Rakobolskaya dedicated a laboratory to the study of cosmic radiation at the Institute of Nuclear Physics in Moscow State University and was in charge of it until 1991. In 1968, she ordered the installation of X-ray emulsion chambers 60 meters below ground inside the Moscow Metro for research of the zenith angular distribution of muons. Their research studied the unusual phenomenon of coplanar expansion of secondary particles; the energy threshold and dependence of the phenomenon was established.

Since 1971 she was the Deputy Head of the Department of Cosmic Rays and Space Physics at MSU and taught courses on cosmic rays and nuclear physics.

In 1962 she defended her thesis for as a candidate for a degree in physical and mathematical sciences and in 1975 defended her thesis for her doctorate of physical and mathematical sciences on the topic generation of high energy muons in cosmic rays. She published over 300 works, including a textbook on nuclear physics.

Throughout her career she educated over 80,000 students, was the chairman of the MSU women's union, and served on the Academic Council of the MSU, the Scientific Council of the Physics Department, and the Scientific Council on Cosmic Rays at the Russian Academy of Sciences. After retiring she continued to give lectures and teach occasionally. Her son Andrei Linde became a theoretical physicist and her other son Nikolai Linde became a psychologist. She died on 22 September 2016 and was buried next to her husband in Novodevichy Cemetery.

== Awards ==
=== Military ===
- Order of the Red Banner
- Three Orders of the Patriotic War
- Order of the Red Star
- Campaign Medals

=== Civilian ===
- Honored Scientist of the Russian SFSR
- Honored Professor of Moscow State University
- Order of the Badge of Honour
- Medal "Veteran of Labour"
- Medal "For Merit in the Conduct of the All-Russian Population Census"
