= Zoya Parfyonova =

Soviet military aviator (1920–1993)

Zoya Ivanovna Parfyonova
- Зоя Ивановна Парфёнова
- Born: 21 June 1920; Alatyr, Simbirsk Governorate, Russian SFSR
- Died: 7 April 1993 (age 72); Moscow, Russian Federation
- Military career
- Allegiance: Soviet Union
- Branch: Soviet Air Force
- Service years: 1941–1945
- Rank: Senior Lieutenant
- Unit: 46th Taman Guards Night Bomber Aviation Regiment
- Conflicts: World War II; Eastern Front
- Awards: Hero of the Soviet Union

Zoya Ivanovna Akimova née Parfyonova (Russian: Зоя Ивановна Парфёнова; 21 June 1920 – 7 April 1993) was a senior lieutenant and deputy squadron commander in the 46th Taman Guards Night Bomber Aviation Regiment during World War II. For completing 815 sorties during the war, she was awarded the title Hero of the Soviet Union on 18 August 1945, making her the only woman from Chuvashia to receive the title.

== Early life ==
Zoya Ivanovna Parfyonova was born on 21 June 1920 to a Russian peasant family in the Russian SFSR, the youngest of five children. She graduated from nursing courses before attending the local flight club and eventually became a flight instructor. Having become the first woman pilot in Alatyr, she trained a large number of young people before the war.

== Military career ==
Parfyonova joined the Soviet military in 1941 shortly after the German invasion of the Soviet Union. In early 1942 she graduated from training at the Engels Military Aviation School and was sent to the Eastern front in May where she fought as part of the regiment in the Southern, Transcaucasus, North Caucasusian and 4th Ukrainian fronts. She became a member of the Communist Party of the Soviet Union in 1943. She bombed Germans over Kuban, the Taman peninsula, Sevastopol, Poland and Germany, reaching the vicinity of Berlin. She did not take part in the Belorussian offensive, because she was recovering from wounds.

On 29 January 1945, when performing a supply drop of ammunition for Soviet ground troops, her Polikarpov Po-2 was attacked by a barrage of anti-aircraft fire and shelling, tearing through the fuselage with shrapnel entering the cockpit, seriously injuring her hip and causing major blood loss. Despite sustaining such injuries in poor visibility combined with heavy snowfall, and despite the significantly reduced maneuverability of the aircraft from the damage sustained, she still managed to land safely, losing consciousness soon afterwards. After the incident she received medical care and informed soldiers of the positions of the Axis anti-aircraft equipment.

By February 1945 she flew 739 sorties, during which she dropped 104 tons of bombs, destroyed Axis ammunition warehouses, an infantry battalion, and equipment as well as dropping 500,000 leaflets and forcing five artillery batteries to retreat. For doing so she was nominated for the title Hero of the Soviet Union on 16 February 1946, which was awarded on 18 August 1945; by the end of the war she had flown 815 missions. In Germany she met her future husband, pilot Mikhail Akimov.

== Postwar life ==
After the end of the Second World War, Parfyonova left active duty and joined the reserve. She was a member of the Soviet Committee of War Veterans. She gave birth to two daughters and worked in the city of Ryazan as a cinema manager until 1979. She moved to Moscow in 1991, where she died on 7 April 1993 and was buried in the Shcherbinsky Central Cemetery.

== Awards and honors ==
- Hero of the Soviet Union (18 August 1945)
- Order of Lenin (18 August 1945)
- Two Orders of the Red Banner (9 September 1942 and 15 June 1945)
- Two Orders of the Patriotic War in the 1st Class (26 April 1944 and 11 March 1985)
- Order of the Red Star (30 November 1942)
- campaign and jubilee medals

== See also ==
- List of female Heroes of the Soviet Union
- "Night Witches"
- Marina Raskova
- Polikarpov Po-2
