= Yevgeniya Rudneva =

Soviet aviator (1920–1944)

Yevgeniya Maksimovna Rudneva
- Евгения Максимовна Руднева
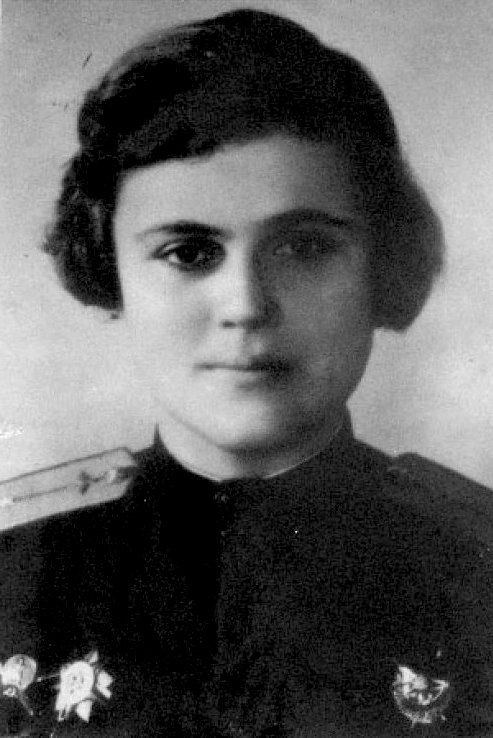
- Born: 24 May 1921 (Note: Many secondary sources indicate that she was born in 1920, but official documents indicate that she was born in 1921.); Berdiansk, Ukraine SSR
- Died: 9 April 1944 (aged 22) near Kerch, Crimea, Soviet Union
- Military career
- Allegiance: Soviet Union
- Branch: Soviet Air Force
- Service years: 1941–1944
- Rank: Senior Lieutenant
- Nickname: Zhenya (Женя)
- Units: 46th Taman Guards Night Bomber Aviation Regiment
- Conflicts: World War II; Eastern Front †
- Awards: Hero of the Soviet Union

Yevgeniya Maksimovna Rudneva (Russian: Евгения Максимовна Руднева; 24 May 1921 – 9 April 1944) was the head navigator of the 46th Guards Night Bomber Regiment posthumously awarded Hero of the Soviet Union. Prior to World War II she was an astronomer, the head of the Solar Department of the Moscow branch of the Astronomical-Geodesical Society of the USSR.

== Civilian life ==
Rudneva was born in Berdiansk to the family of a Ukrainian telegrapher; she was an only child. After finishing her seventh year of secondary school in Moscow, where she spent most of her childhood, she went on to study three years as a student in the faculty of mechanics and mathematics of Moscow State University prior to October 1941, when she volunteered for military service. She became a member of the Communist Party in 1943.

== World War II ==
After joining the Red Army in 1941 Rudneva graduated from navigators courses at the Engels Military Aviation School, where she made her first flight on 5 January 1942. In May that year she and all of the other members of what was then the 588th Night Bomber Regiment were deployed to the Southern Front in May 1942. During her career she flew with many pilots, including future Heroes of the Soviet Union Yevdokiya Nikulina and Irina Sebrova.

She flew 645 night combat missions on the old and slow Polikarpov Po-2 biplane, destroying river crossings, troop trains, troops and military equipment of the enemy. During the war she flew on bombing missions on the Transcaucasian, North Caucasian, and 4th Ukrainian fronts as well as in battles for the Taman and Kerch peninsulas.

On the night of 9 April 1944 she was shot down while navigating for Praskovya "Panna" Prokofyeva, one of the new pilots in the regiment.

=== Personal views ===
In her letter to professor Sergey Blazhko, head of the Astrometry Department of Moscow State University, dated 19 October 1942, she wrote that the first bomb she had promised the Nazis would be in retaliation for the bombing of the Faculty of Mechanics and Mathematics that winter. She wrote that she was defending the honor of the university.

== Awards and honors ==
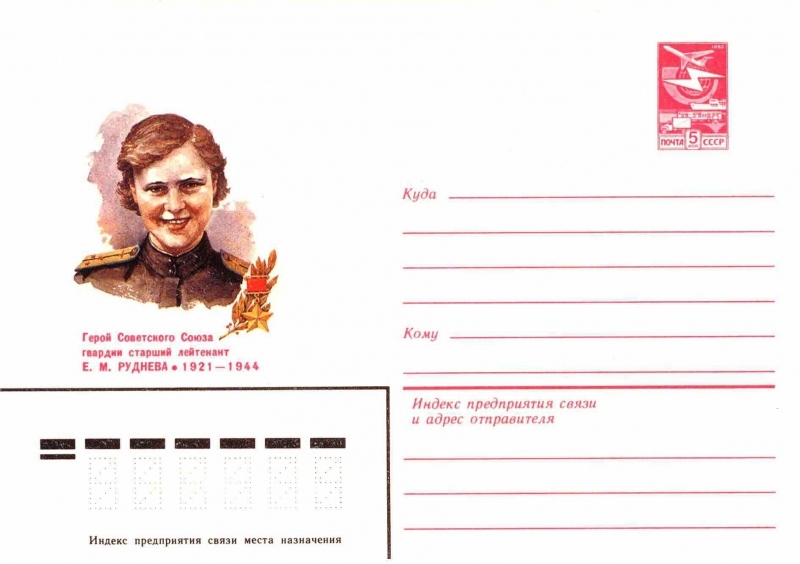
1983 Soviet envelope featuring Rudneva, from a series of envelopes featuring Heroes of the Soviet Union

- Hero of the Soviet Union (26 October 1944)
- Order of Lenin (26 October 1944)
- Order of the Red Banner (27 April 1943)
- Order of the Patriotic War 1st Class (25 October 1943)
- Order of the Red Star (9 September 1942)

Monuments to her were built in Moscow, Kerch and the Saltykovka settlement (in Moscow Oblast). The Asteroid 1907 Rudneva, a school in Kerch, streets in Berdiansk, Kerch, Moscow and Saltykovka were named after her.

== See also ==
- List of female Heroes of the Soviet Union

== Bibliography ==
- Cottam, Kazimiera (1998). Women in War and Resistance: Selected Biographies of Soviet Women Soldiers. Newburyport, MA: Focus Publishing/R. Pullins Co. ISBN 1585101605. OCLC 228063546.
- Shkadov, Ivan (1988). Герои Советского Союза: краткий биографический словарь II, Любовь - Яшчук. Moscow: Voenizdat. ISBN 5203005362. OCLC 247400113.
- Simonov, Andrey; Chudinova, Svetlana (2017). Женщины - Герои Советского Союза и России. Moscow: Russian Knights Foundation and Museum of Technology Vadim Zadorozhny. ISBN 9785990960701. OCLC 1019634607.
- Rakobolskaya, Irina; Kravtsova, Natalya (2005). Нас называли ночными ведьмами: так воевал женский 46-й гвардейский полк ночных бомбардировщиков. Moscow: University of Moscow Press. ISBN 5211050088. OCLC 68044852.
