= Harassing fire =

Tactic in warfare

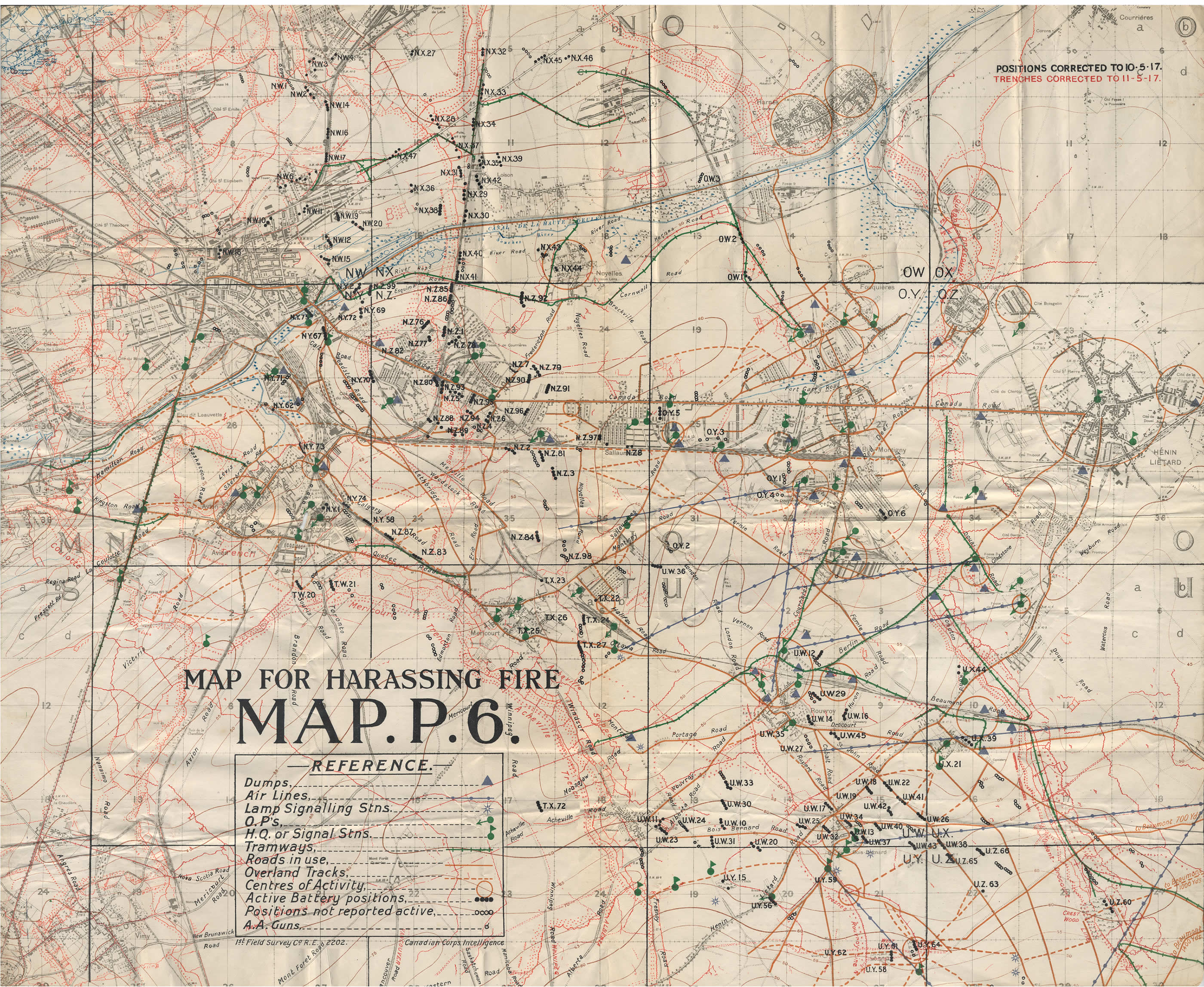
British World War I artillery map used for planning harassing fire in the Lens sector of France, May 1917.

Harassing fire (or Harassment and interdiction) is a form of psychological warfare in which an enemy force is subjected to random, unpredictable and intermittent small-arms or artillery fire over an extended period of time (usually at night and times of low conflict intensity) in an effort to undermine morale, increase the enemy's stress levels and deny them the opportunity for sleep, rest and resupply. This lowers the enemy's overall readiness and fighting ability, acting as a force multiplier for the harassing force.

As the name suggests, harassing fire is undertaken as an extreme form of nuisance without a major effort to produce significant casualties or to support a larger attack. The intent is to merely ensure the enemy can never fully rest or attend to non-combat related tasks and must always be alert and in cover from incoming fire. For this reason, harassing fire is often conducted at night (or around the clock if resources allow) and by a small number of guns or artillery pieces rather than the whole contingent. The denial of sleep and constant alert state it induces is physically and psychologically unsustainable by infantry forces for any length of time, and eventually causes severe degenerative stress and degradation of the force's combat abilities. For this reason, it has been a standard and efficacious tactic used since the introduction of the projectile weapon.

== History ==
=== Antiquity ===
Harassing fire became commonplace after the invention of the catapult and trebuchet, which could be used to hurl a variety of harmful objects over fortified walls during the siege of a city or castle. Since such a siege could drag on for months or years if the attackers were unable to forcibly breach the walls, an alternative plan called for patience coupled with regular harassing fire in an effort to induce the defenders to surrender due to low morale, disease, and starvation. Aside from lethal projectiles such as stones and iron balls, the artillery of the time would also throw harassment projectiles: rotting bodies (both men and animals), plague-infected corpses, piles of human excrement, beehives and the severed heads of captured enemy prisoners of war, all in an effort to harass and discourage the besieged defenders until they surrendered.

=== World War I ===
Harassing fire entered a new phase following the widespread mass-production of cheap, long-range high-explosive artillery in World War I, assisted by the static, inflexible nature of the defensive positions faced. Whole batteries on all sides of the conflict were dedicated to harassing fire (especially prior to a planned infantry attack) and the concept was refined to a science, complete with formulae for shells-per-hour and pattern density to ensure sleep and resupply were statistically impossible for the targeted force. In most cases, resupply and relief was already nearly impossible during the day due to artillery observers, and the addition of random harassing fire at night meant even fewer replacements and supplies could reach the front. The shell shock this eventually induced in the enemy was usually a dissociative psychological reaction to months of unending explosions, fear, hunger and sleep deprivation.

=== World War II ===
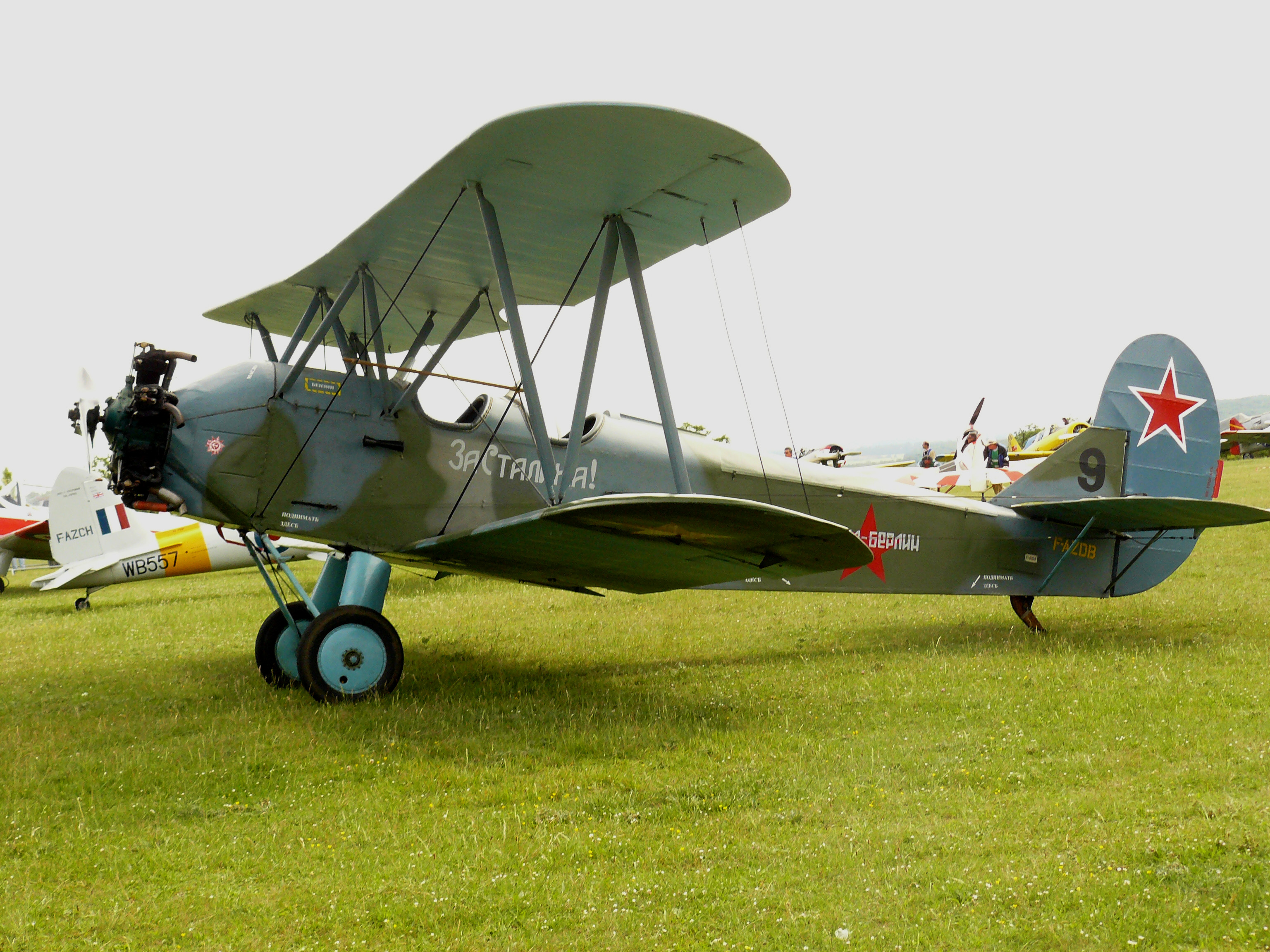
Polikarpov U-2 (Po-2)

Harassing fire continued to be an effective and widespread practice in World War II as bomber aircraft and missiles were added to the equation. Soviet forces famously formed three all-female military aviation regiments in 1942 (the 586th, 587th and 588th), with the 588th Regiment exclusively equipped for night harassment raids with obsolescent Polikarpov Po-2 biplane trainer aircraft. Although very slow, poorly armed and virtually defenseless during the day, the nearly all-wood structure Po-2 was exceptionally cheap and reliable, could carry six small, 50 kg (110 lb), HE bombs and was nearly silent when flown by an expert at night; its small, low-RPM five-cylinder radial piston engine produced only a muted rattling for a sound signature, far quieter and less identifiable than the supercharged aero-engines of a then-modern fighter/bomber. As a result, it was much harder to pinpoint the plane's exact bearing or distance and gave the target very little warning of their arrival.

Although initially sneered at by the Germans, who called the Po-2 Russenfurnier ("Russian plywood") or Die Nähmaschine ("the sewing machine"), it proved unexpectedly effective at night harassment attacks on rear areas of the German lines, flying so low and slow the German fighters were unable to locate or engage them. The otherwise obsolescent-for-combat wood-and-fabric plane also proved both highly resistant to standard armor-piercing anti-aircraft ammunition, as well as invisible to modern radar, leaving the Germans with no option but blind saturation flak and searchlights, neither of which were particularly successful and helped further ensure nobody in an encampment could get any restful sleep. Soon the Germans frustratedly dubbed the women pilots Die Nachthexen, "The Night Witches", and Luftwaffe pilots and anti-aircraft gunners were promised the Iron Cross if they managed to shoot down even a single Po-2. The Germans themselves began using their own obsolescent aircraft for similar raids against the Soviets, first with the Störkampfstaffel-named squadron-size units, then banding those together into Nachtschlachtgruppe units for this purpose, using similarly simple, widely available planes like the Gotha Go 145, the Henschel Hs 126 or the Arado Ar 66.

Early in the Pacific Theater of World War II during the Guadalcanal campaign, American forces defending Henderson Field from the Japanese were periodically harassed by a small number of Japanese military aircraft on night harassment raids, with their engine(s) deliberately adjusted to run in a manner that would awake American troops at night.

Harassing fire also expanded to civilians as terror bombing of cities became the norm. In a 1944 report on the recent introduction of the V-1 Flying Bomb, Time magazine referred to the attacks on London as a form of harassing fire, since they were random and frightening attacks (usually at night) designed to damage English civilian morale rather than directly disable members of the British military. A tired, frightened worker would produce less war material at their daily factory jobs, they opined.

During the Korean War, the Po-2 was once again used for "Bedcheck Charlie" night harassment attacks, this time by the North Korean People's Air Force against the UN forces defending South Korea – successful raids by the KPAF on UN air bases even managed to destroy small numbers of F-51 Mustang and F-86 Sabre fighters early in the war.

=== Vietnam War ===
The term "Harassment and Interdiction" (H&I) was used in the Vietnam War to describe artillery missions where artillery batteries fired on suspected enemy areas and movements based on intelligence reports concerning enemy activity. These missions engaged suspected targets with no more than a few rounds fired at random intervals throughout the night, and sometimes during the day, seeking to deny enemy freedom of movement and to destroy enemy morale. The bulk of H&I fire was aimed at river crossings, paths and trails, junctures, gullies, ridgelines, or where river valleys left the highlands and entered the coastal plain. American, Australian, and New Zealand artillery batteries also regularly shelled the likely approaches to bases, fire support bases, and night defensive positions.

=== Modern day ===
The concept continues to be relevant in modern warfare and remains in the artillery curriculum of the US Army War College and the US Army's War Plans Division.

== See also ==
- Predicted fire
- Fire for effect
- Suppressing fire
- Washing Machine Charlie
