= Vorobyovo =

Vorobyovo Воробьёво
- Village
- Location within Perm Krai Location within Russia
- Coordinates: 59°38′N 54°02′E
- Country: Russia
- Region: Perm Krai
- District: Kochyovsky District
- Time zone: UTC+5:00

Vorobyovo (Russian: Воробьёво) is a rural locality (a village) in Kochyovskoye Rural Settlement, Kochyovsky District, Perm Krai, Russia. The population was 66 as of 2010. There are 4 streets.

== Geography ==
Vorobyovo is located 18 km northwest of Kochyovo (the district's administrative centre) by road. Dema is the nearest rural locality.
