= Natalya Meklin =

Russian military aviator (1922–2005)

Natalya Fyodorovna Kravtsova née Meklin
- Russian: Наталья Фёдоровна Меклин
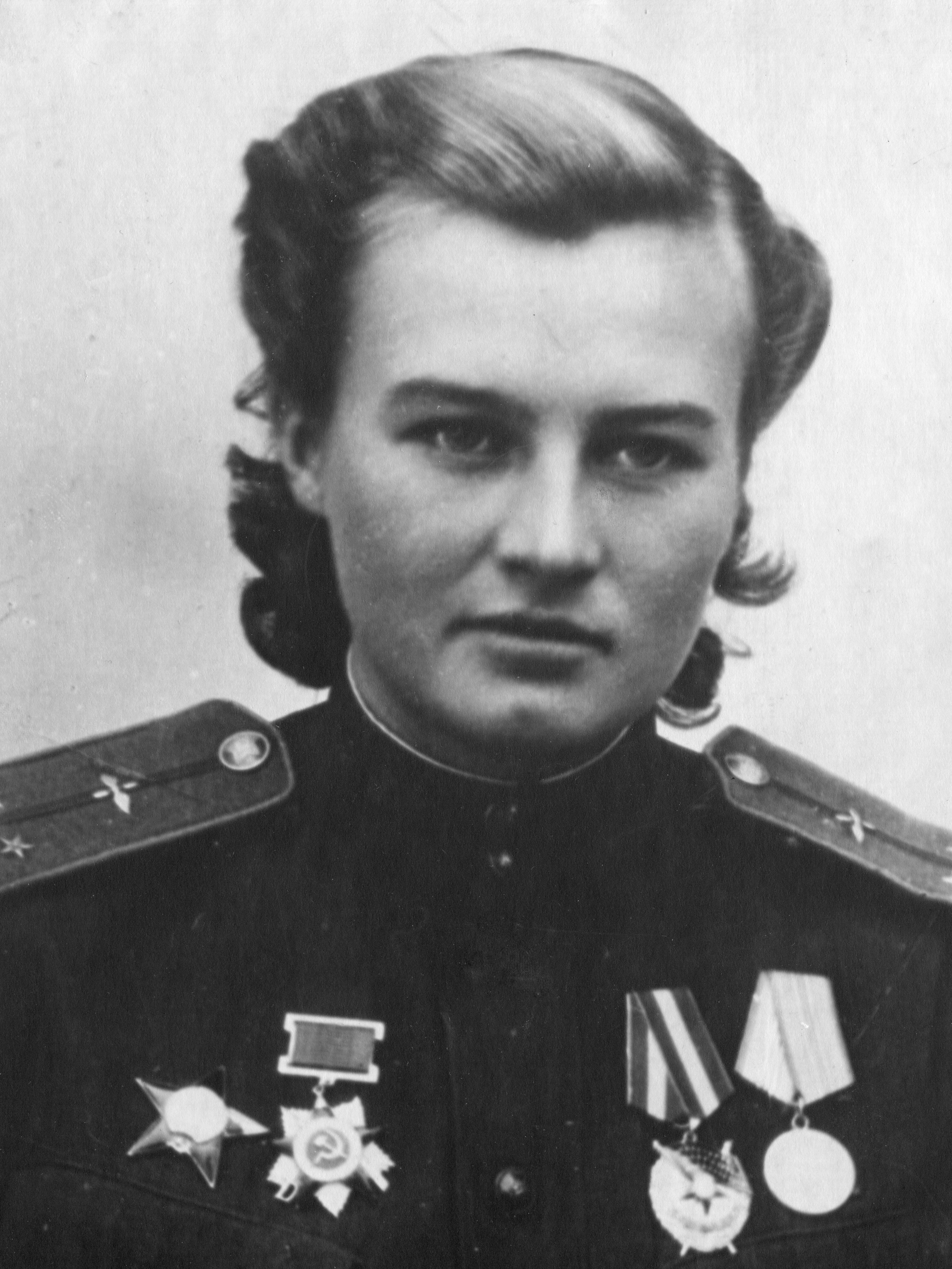
- Born: 8 September 1922; Lubny, Ukrainian SSR
- Died: 5 June 2005 (aged 82); Moscow, Russian Federation
- Military career
- Allegiance: Soviet Union
- Branch: Soviet Air Force
- Service years: 1941 – 1957
- Rank: Major
- Unit: 46th Taman Guards Night Bomber Aviation Regiment
- Conflicts: World War II
- Awards: Hero of the Soviet Union
- Other work: Author, translator

Natalya Fyodorovna Kravtsova née Meklin (Russian: Наталья Фёдоровна Меклин; 8 September 1922 – 5 June 2005) was a flight commander in the 46th Taman Guards Night Bomber Aviation Regiment, one of the three women's aviation regiments founded by Marina Raskova after the German invasion of the Soviet Union. The regiment later came to be known as the "Night Witches" by German targets. She was awarded the title Hero of the Soviet Union in February 1945 for completing 840 sorties and gained significant publicity.

== Early civilian life ==
Meklin was born on 8 September 1922 to a working-class Russian family in Lubny, then part of the Ukrainian SSR. Her childhood and youth were spent in Smila, Kharkov (now Kharkiv), and Kiev (now Kyiv). In 1940 she graduated from her tenth grade of schooling in Kiev. That year, she joined the glider school at the Kiev Young Pioneer Palace and later graduated from the Moscow Aviation Institute in 1941.

== World War II career ==
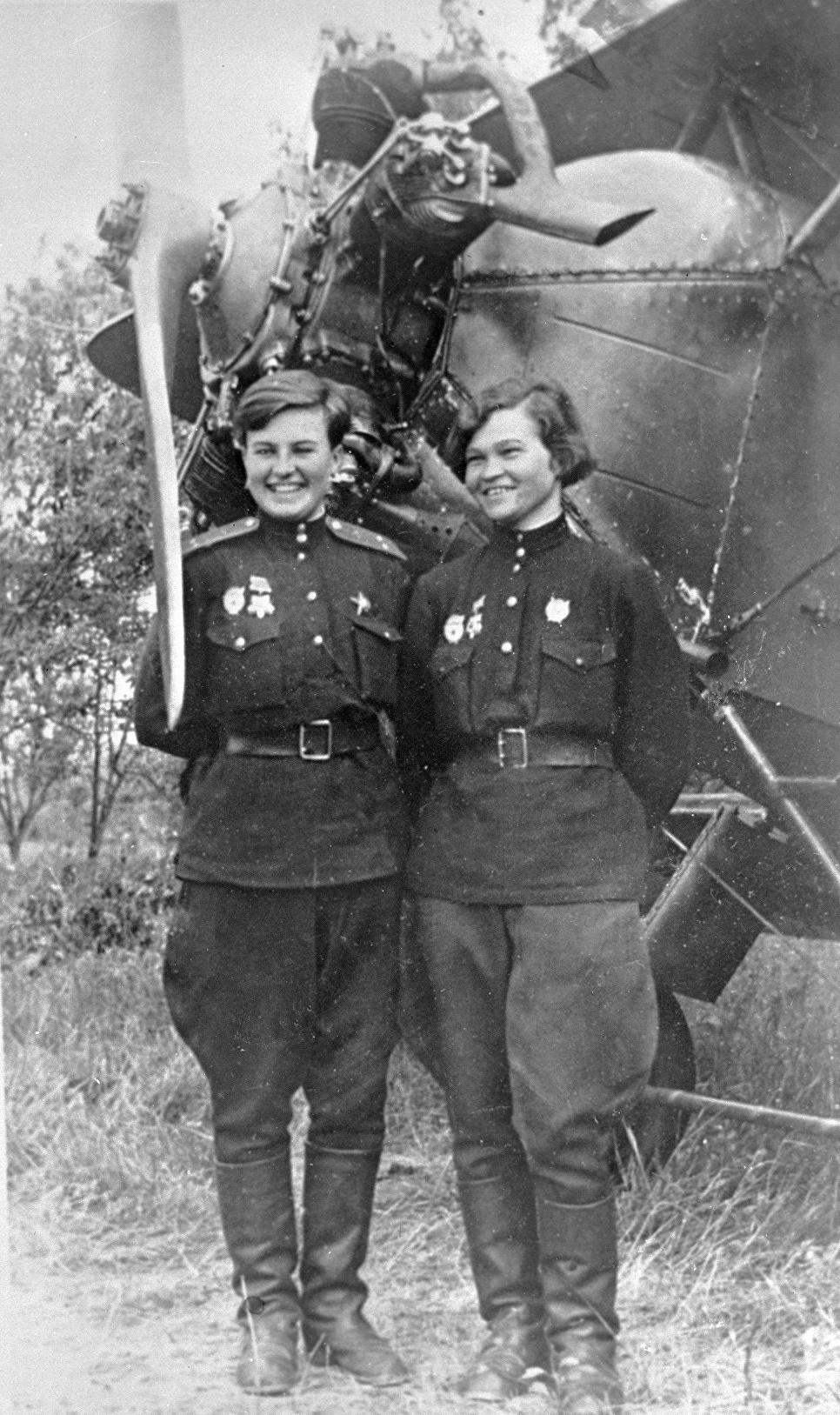
Meklin (left) and Irina Sebrova by a Po-2, 1943

In October 1941, several months after the German invasion of the Soviet Union, Meklin applied to join one of the three women's aviation regiments founded by Marina Raskova, and was accepted into training. In Spring 1942, having graduated from navigation training at Engels Military Aviation School, she was sent to the Eastern front of World War II as the chief of communications of a squadron in the 588th Night Bomber Aviation Regiment, which was later honored with the Guards designation and renamed the 46th Taman Guards Night Bomber Aviation Regiment in 1943. During the ceremony when the regiment received the guards flag, Meklin was the standard-bearer, assisted by Glafira Kashirina and Yekaterina Titova. Initially she flew as a navigator for Mariya Smirnova and later Irina Sebrova, but she soon retrained to become a pilot and by 18 May 1943 she made her first sortie as a pilot, which was her 381st mission. By the end of the war she held the position of flight commander.

During the war she flew night bombing missions in a Polikarpov Po-2 over the battles for of the Caucasus, Crimea, Kuban, Kerch, Poland, and Germany spanning the Southern, North Caucasian, 4th Ukrainian and 2nd Byelorussian Fronts. In 1943 she was admitted to the Communist Party.

By the end of the war she had flown an estimated 980 night missions and dropped an estimated 147 tons of bombs on enemy-controlled territory. While a lieutenant, she was awarded the title Hero of the Soviet Union on 23 February 1945 for her first 840 missions by decree of the Supreme Soviet; the gold star medal was presented to her in Poland on 8 March 1945 by Marshal Konstantin Rokossovsky. She became a reserve officer in October 1945.

Her picture was featured on the cover of the May 1943 issue of Smena magazine, the front page of Komsomolskaya Pravda in February 1945, and many other wartime publications.

== Postwar life ==
Natalya completed two years at Moscow State University before re-enlisting in the military in 1947. From 1948 to 1957 she studied at the Military Institute of Foreign Languages and subsequently worked as a translator before retiring. She became a member of the Union of Soviet Writers in 1972. Several schools are named after her in Smolensk, Poltava, Stavropol and other cities. Shortly before her death she co-authored a book with her colleague from the regiment Irina Rakobolskaya titled Nas nazyvali nochnymi vedmami (Russian: Нас называли ночными ведьмами; 'We Were Called Night Witches') about the regiment's experiences during the war. On 5 June 2005, she died in Moscow and was buried in Troyekurovskoye Cemetery.

== Awards and honors ==
- Hero of the Soviet Union (23 February 1945)
- Order of Lenin (23 February 1945)
- Three Orders of the Red Banner (14 April 1944, 14 December 1944, and 15 June 1945)
- Order of the Red Star (19 October 1942)
- Order of the Patriotic War 1st and 2nd class (1st class - 11 March 1985; 2nd class - 27 April 1943)
- Medal "For Battle Merit" (19 November 1951)
- Order of the Badge of Honour (7 September 1982)
- Medal of Zhukov
- A.A.Fadeev prize for writing (May 1980)
- campaign and jubilee medals

== See also ==
- List of female Heroes of the Soviet Union
- Hero of the Soviet Union
- Irina Rakobolskaya
- Night Witches
