= Nina Ulyanenko =

Soviet aviator (1923–2005)

Nina Zakharovna Ulyanenko
- Нина Захаровна Ульяненко
- Born: 17 December 1923; Votkinsk, Ural Oblast, Soviet Union
- Died: 31 August 2005 (aged 81); Izhevsk, Udmurtia, Russia
- Military career
- Allegiance: Soviet Union
- Branch: Soviet Air Force
- Service years: 1942–1945
- Rank: Lieutenant
- Unit: 46th "Taman" Guards Night Bomber Aviation Regiment
- Conflicts: World War II; Eastern Front
- Awards: Hero of the Soviet Union
- Other work: Supreme Soviet deputy, Teacher

Nina Zakharovna Ulyanenko (Russian: Нина Захаровна Ульяненко; 17 December 1923 – 31 August 2005) was a navigator, pilot and flight commander in the women's 46th Taman Guards Night Bomber Aviation Regiment during World War II, after which she was awarded the title Hero of the Soviet Union on 18 August 1945.

== Early life ==
Ulyanenko was born on 17 December 1923 to a working-class Russian family in Votkinsk, Sarapul district, in what is now the capital of Udmurtiya. Due to her parents divorcing when she was only seven years old she was brought up by her mother. Amazed and fascinated by three famous women aviators Valentina Grizodubova, Polina Osipenko, and Marina Raskova she frequently saw in the newspapers, she decided to enroll at the local aeroclub while in ninth grade, during which she juggled evening schoolwork and studying aviation. She went on to graduate from her tenth grade of school as well as the local aeroclub in 1940, having made her first flight on 11 April 1940. From August 1940 to August 1941 she worked as a kindergarten teacher, but wanting to return to aviation, she entered the Saratov Aviation Technical School in September.

== World War II career ==
Due to the recent German invasion of the Soviet Union, Ulyanenko voluntarily enlisted in the military in January 1942 to join the women's aviation group founded by Marina Raskova. The next month she finished a highly condensed navigator's course at the Engels Military Aviation School and was subsequently assigned to the 587th Bomber Aviation Regiment, the daylight dive-bomber women's aviation regiment, but was then transferred in March to the 588th Night Bomber Regiment, (which used the Po-2 light utility aircraft for night bombing missions) before being deployed with the rest of the regiment to the Southern Front in May 1942; in February 1943 the unit was honored with the guards designation and renamed to the 46th Guards Night Bomber Aviation Regiment. Later that year when the regiment was planning to retrain mechanics as navigators and navigators as pilots to form an additional squadron she expressed a desire to become a pilot in the unit, having previous experience of being a pilot from training at her aeroclub. In 1944 she became a flight commander in the regiment. She took part in battles for the Caucasus, Crimea, Poland, East Prussia and eventually in the Battle of Berlin. By mid February 1945, she had flown 388 sorties as navigator and an additional 530 sorties as pilot in command of a Polikarpov Po-2; by the end of the war she had flown 905 sorties, dropping 120 tonnes of bombs, damaging ten vehicles, four ferries, and forcing four artillery batteries to retreat. For her service in the war, she was awarded the title Hero of the Soviet Union on 18 August 1945.

== Later life ==
After leaving the military at the end of the war Ulyanenko entered the Military Institute of Foreign Languages of Moscow in November 1945. In 1946 she moved to the city of Kursk with her husband Nikolai Minakov, where she worked for two years as a writer for the newspaper Kurskaya Pravda. In 1948 she moved to the city of Izhevsk in Udmurtia where she worked as an editor for the newspaper Udmurt Pravda. Between 1947 and 1951 she was a deputy of the Supreme Soviet. From 1957 on she worked as a teacher and as an instructor at a local DOSAAF flying club after graduating from Udmurt State University in 1955. She died on 31 August 2005 and was buried in the Khokhryakovskoye cemetery.

== Awards and honors ==
- Hero of the Soviet Union (18 August 1945)
- Order of Lenin (18 August 1945)
- Two Orders of the Red Banner (17 June 1943 and 15 June 1945)
- Order of the Patriotic War 1st class and 2nd class (11 March 1985 and 29 February 1944)
- Order of the Red Star (29 December 1942)
- campaign and jubilee medals

== See also ==
- List of female Heroes of the Soviet Union
