= Yevdokiya Rachkevich =

Soviet military aviator (1907–1975)

Yevdokiya Yakovlevna Rachkevich
- Евдокия Яковлевна Рачкевич
- Rachkevich, c. 1950's
- Born: Yevdokiya Yakovlevna Andriychuk; 22 December 1907; Nadnestrryanskoye village, Russian Empire (now Murovani Kurylivtsi, Ukraine)
- Died: 7 January 1975 (aged 67); Moscow, Soviet Union
- Military career
- Allegiance: Soviet Union
- Branch: Soviet Air Force
- Service years: 1941−1956
- Rank: Lieutenant colonel
- Unit: 46th Taman Guards Night Bomber Aviation Regiment
- Conflicts: World War II
- Awards: Order of the Red Banner; Order of the Patriotic War, 1st Class; Order of the Red Star (2)

Yevdokiya Yakovlevna Rachkevich (Russian: Евдокия Яковлевна Рачкевич; née Andriychuk; 22 December 1907 – 7 January 1975) was the deputy regimental commander and commissar of the 46th Guards Night Bomber Aviation Regiment (a.k.a., the "Night Witches") during the Second World War. After the end of the war, Rachkevich traced the regiment's path throughout the war and managed to locate the remains of women in the regiment that were listed as missing in action so that they could receive a proper burial. Soldiers that went missing in action were considered potential traitors until their remains were found because they could have been captured, and Soviet prisoners of war were considered "guilty until proven innocent" of collaboration with the Axis, especially after Order No. 270 forbid surrender or retreat.

== Early life and prewar career ==
Rachkevich was born on 22 December 1907 in what was then the village of Nadnestrryanskoye in the Russian Empire, now located within present-day Ukraine. In 1919 she graduated from a parish school in her hometown. In 1922 she worked as a janitor for the Kamyanets-Podilsky border guard where she worked until she became a member of the Communist party in 1926 and was transferred to work as a district organizer in Kamenets-Podilski. In 1928 she graduated from a one-year law school in Kiev before working as a judge for two years, after which she began working as an assistant to the regional prosecutor in Zhytomyr. In 1931 she married Pavel Rachkevich, who was the commissar 3rd Cavalry Regiment of the 1st Krasnokazchie Division. In 1932 she enlisted in the Red Army and was assigned to work as a political instructor in the 1st Krasnozakachy Division. In 1934 she entered the Lenin Military-Political Academy; in 1937 she became the first woman to graduate from the academy, after which she taught at the Leningrad School of Military Communications.

== World War II ==
After the German invasion of the Soviet Union in 1941 Rachkevich was the commissar of a military field hospital from July 16 to September 28. After taking accelerated navigator's courses at Engels military aviation school she was deployed in February 1942 as the commissar of the 588th Night Bomber Regiment, which received the Guards designation in 1943 and was reorganized to the 46th Guards Night Bomber Aviation Regiment of the 325th Night Bomber Aviation Division within the 4th Air Army on the 2nd Belorussian Front. She later became the deputy regiment commander of the political department of the regiment. During the war she occasionally accompanied bombing sorties, flying as a navigator on 36 missions in addition to equipping the Po-2s for flights. After the war she was demobilized from the military with the rank of major until she was recalled to the military in 1951.

== Later life ==
After re-entering the military in 1951 Rachkevich served as a political instructor for a unit of Soviet troops in East Germany until she retired in 1956 with the rank of Lieutenant colonel. After retirement from the military she lived in Moscow where she involved herself in public work; she later managed to locate the remains of all members of the 46th Guards Night Bomber Aviation Regiment shot down in the war, marking the crash sites as memorials. She died on 7 January 1975 and was buried in the Khovanskoye cemetery.
