= Maguba Syrtlanova =

WWII pilot and Heroine of the Soviet Union

- Мәгубә Хөсәен кызы Сыртланова
- Born: 15 July [O.S. 2 July] 1912; Belebey, Bashkortostan, Russian Empire
- Died: 1 October 1971 (aged 61); Kazan, USSR
- Military career
- Allegiance: Soviet Union
- Branch: Soviet Air Force
- Service years: 1941–1945
- Rank: Senior Lieutenant
- Unit: 46th Taman Guards Night Bomber Aviation Regiment
- Awards: Hero of the Soviet Union

Maguba Guseynovna Syrtlanova (Russian: Магуба Гусейновна Сыртланова, Tatar: Мәгубә Хөсәен кызы Сыртланова; 15 July [O.S. 2 July] 1912 – 1 October 1971) was a senior lieutenant and deputy squadron commander in the 46th Taman Guards Night Bomber Aviation Regiment (nicknamed the "night witches") during the Second World War. She was awarded the title of Hero of the Soviet Union on 15 May 1946 for having completed 780 sorties during the war.

== Early life ==
Born on 15 July [O.S. 2 July] 1912 to a Tatar family in Belebey, Bashkortostan, of the Russian Empire, she was a student at the Kazan Chemistry College after completing her secondary education in 1927. She was unable to finish her studies in Kazan because she had to move to the Uzbek SSR with her older brother.

After relocating briefly she worked in Kokand as a telegraph operator from December 1929 to January 1930 before moving on to work at a silk factory in Margilan, where she later became a Komsomol secretary. In 1931 she completed training to become a surveyor in Tashkent, after which she worked in the field for the Central Asia division of the civil air fleet. After furthering her studies in Leningrad she was promoted to senior surveyor of the Central Asia regional Aeroflot directorate.

Having developed a desire to pursue aviation, she entered the Balashov Flight School in January 1933 and completed theoretical training, but was expelled in October that year without explanation. Not giving up, she worked as an aircraft mechanic in Tbilisi where she eventually was able to pursue her dream of learning to fly. After graduating from the Tbilisi aeroclub in 1935 she went on to work as a flight instructor at the school; from January 1936 to January 1937 she taught at the Tbilisi Glider School. After leaving the glider school she returned to the Tbilisi Aeroclub, where she trained 156 pilots before July 1941.

== World War II ==
Following the June 1941 Axis invasion of the Soviet Union, Syrtlanova entered the military. Initially she continued to teach in Tbilisi, since the aeroclub had become the 26th Military Aviation School of Pilots. After Axis forces made significant territorial gains and neared the Caucasus in September 1942, the school had to close.

She then briefly served as a flight commander in a medical squadron in the Transcaucasian Front, before joining the 588th Night Bomber Aviation Regiment in November. After arriving at the regiment in December 1942 she quickly gained a reputation as a confident, oriented, and successful pilot. Despite her relative lack of combat experience due to arriving at the front late, she eventually won promotion from pilot to flight commander, partially due to her vast amount of pre-war experience piloting the aircraft type used by the regiment, the Po-2. Not long after the unit was honored with a "Guards" designation and renamed as the 46th Guards Bomber Aviation Regiment in February 1943, Syrtlanova was awarded the Order of the Red Banner for completing 104 successful sorties. She continued tallying sorties throughout the war, completing 100 during the battle for the Taman peninsula (September–October 1943) and 172 in the battle for Crimea of April–May 1944, going so far as making eight sorties in one night, during one of which she took out an artillery battery. By the end of the war, she had achieved the position of deputy squadron commander, and on 20 June 1945 she was nominated for the title Hero of the Soviet Union for having performed 780 sorties, dropped 104 tons of bombs on enemy territory, and safely guided her aircraft through heavy anti-aircraft fire and poor weather, destroying three artillery batteries, two searchlights, two trains, a fuel warehouse, and four ground vehicles. She was awarded the title on 15 May 1946.

== Later life ==
Syrtlanova remained in the Air Force, based in Poland, until being demobilized in October 1945. She then moved back to Tbilisi, where she worked as a manager in the civil air fleet from December 1945 to January 1948. She married Maksim Fyodorovich Babkin. They had two daughters, Svetlana and Natalya. After moving to Kazan in 1950, she worked at a factory that made aircraft and missile parts.

After a prolonged illness she died on 1 October 1971 and was buried in the Tatar cemetery.

== Awards ==
- Hero of the Soviet Union (15 May 1946)
- Order of Lenin (15 May 1946)
- Two Orders of the Red Banner (28 May 1943 and 22 May 1945)
- Order of the Patriotic War 2nd class (20 October 1943)
- Order of the Red Star (26 April 1944)
- campaign and jubilee medals

== See also ==
- List of female Heroes of the Soviet Union
- "Night Witches"
- Marina Raskova
- Polikarpov Po-2
