= Yevgeniya Zhigulenko =

Russian film director and aviator (1920–1994)

Yevgeniya Andreyevna Zhigulenko
- Евгения Андреевна Жигуленко
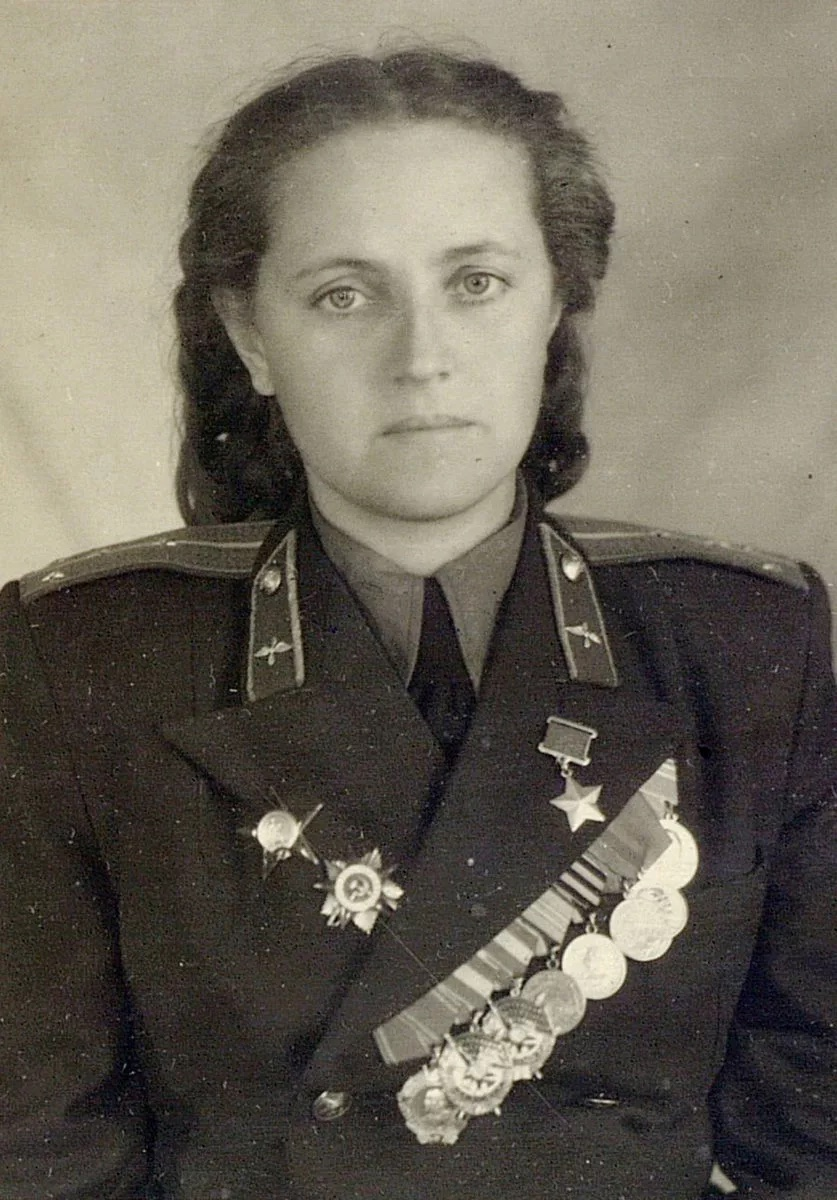
- Born: 1 December 1920; Krasnodar, Russian SFSR
- Died: 2 March 1994 (aged 73); Moscow, Russian Federation
- Military career
- Allegiance: Soviet Union
- Branch: Soviet Air Force
- Service years: 1941–1955
- Rank: Major
- Unit: 46th Taman Guards Night Bomber Aviation Regiment
- Conflicts: World War II; Eastern Front
- Awards: Hero of the Soviet Union

Yevgeniya Andreyevna Zhigulenko (Russian: Евгения Андреевна Жигуленко; 1 December 1920 – 2 March 1994) was a pilot and navigator in the 46th Taman Guards Night Bomber Aviation Regiment of the Soviet Air Forces during World War II who was awarded the title Hero of the Soviet Union.

== Civilian life ==
Zhigulenko was born on 1 December 1920 in Krasnodar to a working family. After graduating from secondary school in Tikhoretsk in 1939 she studied at the Moscow Aviation Technology Institute and then graduated from flight school at Moscow Aeroclub. She became a member of the Communist Party of the Soviet Union in 1942.

== Second World War ==
In October 1941 she joined the Soviet military and participated in battles on the Eastern Front starting in May 1942 after graduating from her military navigation courses. She initially served as a navigator but went on to become a pilot, after which she was promoted to the position of flight commander. Her regiment was officially designated the 588th Night Bomber Regiment until it was renamed in 1943 to the 46th Taman Guards Night Bomber Aviation Regiment. During the war she participated in bombing campaigns on the Southern, Caucasian, and Belorussian fronts as well as in Berlin, Crimea, Kerch, Kolberg, Kuban, Mlavsko-Elbing, Mogilev, and Osowiec. In addition to bombing enemy targets she flew missions to resupply the Red Army. By November 1944 she had dropped 89 tons of bombs on targets, destroyed three crossing points, a searchlight, three artillery batteries, and started 177 fires. Upon the end of the war she flew 968 missions, during which she had encountered many close-calls with death. For completing her first 773 sorties she was awarded the title Hero of the Soviet Union on 23 February 1945.

== After the war ==
Zhigulenko remained in the air force on active duty until 1955 when she graduated the Lenin Military-Political Academy in 1955; she was the second woman to graduate from the school. In 1976 she graduated from the All-Union State Institute of Cinematography after which she worked as a film director, and created two major films: "In the Sky of the Night Witches" (1981) and "Without the Right to Fail" (1984). She died at the age of 73 on 27 February 1994 and was buried in the Troyekurovskoye Cemetery.

== Awards ==
- Hero of the Soviet Union (23 February 1945)
- Order of Lenin (23 February 1945)
- Two Orders of the Red Banner (19 October 1942 and 15 June 1945)
- Two Orders of the Patriotic War in the 1st Class (30 October 1943 and 11 March 1985)
- Two Orders of the Red Star (26 April 1944 and 5 November 1954)
- Medal "For Battle Merit" (17 May 1951)
- campaign and jubilee medals

== See also ==
- List of female Heroes of the Soviet Union
- "Night Witches"
- Marina Raskova
- Polikarpov Po-2
