= Polina Gelman =

Soviet military aviator (1919–2005)

- Полина Гельман
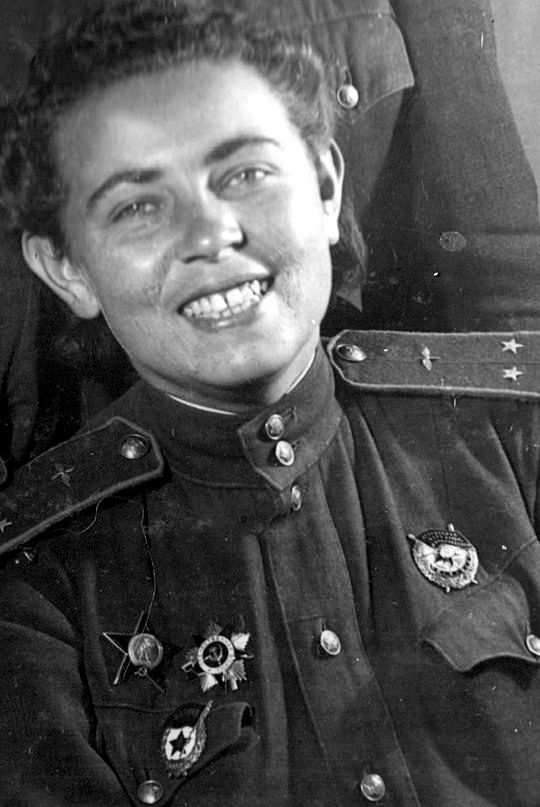
- Born: 24 October 1919; Berdichev, Ukraine
- Died: 25 November 2005 (aged 86); Moscow, Russia
- Military career
- Allegiance: Soviet Union
- Branch: Soviet Air Force
- Service years: 1941–1957
- Rank: Lieutenant Colonel
- Unit: 46th Taman Guards Night Bomber Aviation Regiment
- Conflicts: World War II
- Awards: Hero of the Soviet Union

Polina Vladimirovna Gelman (Russian: Полина Владимировна Гельман; Ukrainian: Поліна Володимирівна Гельман; 24 October 1919 – 25 November 2005) was a flight navigator in the all-female 46th Guards Night Bomber Aviation Regiment who was awarded the title of Hero of the Soviet Union in 1946 for having totaled 857 sorties during World War II.

== Early life ==
Polina Gelman was born to a working-class Jewish family in Berdichev, Ukraine, in 1919. After the death of her father, she lived in Gomel, Belarus, with her mother. In 1938, she completed her tenth grade of school and graduated from the Gomel glider school. Admitted to the history department of Moscow State University, she attended some classes at the school before the war cut her schooling short.

== World War II ==
A history major at MSU at the time of the German invasion of the Soviet Union, Gelman was recruited by Marina Raskova to join the newly formed women's aviation group. Following training at Engels Military Aviation School, she was deployed to the Southern Front in May 1942 with the women's 588th Night Bomber Regiment, later redesignated as the 46th Taman Guards Night Bomber Aviation Regiment in 1943. Starting in September 1943, she began flying as navigator for Raisa Aronova, who also went on to become a Hero of the Soviet Union. By the end of the war she reached the rank of senior lieutenant and totaled 857 combat sorties, dropping 113 tonnes of bombs, having participated in bombing campaigns in the North Caucasus, Stavropol, Kuban, Novorossiysk, Crimea, Kuban, Kerch, Belorussia, Poland, and Germany across the Southern, Transcaucasus, North Caucasus, 4th Ukrainian, and 2nd Belarusian fronts. The day after the end of the war she was nominated for the title Hero of the Soviet Union, which was awarded to her over a year later on 15 May 1946.

== Post-war life ==
Continuing her career as a professional military officer, she was sent for instruction as a military translator, graduating from the Military Institute of Foreign Languages in 1951.

Gelman settled in Moscow following her retirement from active service as a major in 1957, and worked at the Institute of Social Sciences teaching political economy as a college instructor until retiring in 1990. She attained the rank of lieutenant colonel in the reserves. A member of the Communist Party of the Soviet Union since 1942, she was sent as an advisor and translator to Cuba. She died in Moscow on 25 November 2005 and was buried in the Novodevichy Cemetery.

== Honours and awards ==
- Hero of the Soviet Union (15 May 1946)
- Order of Lenin (15 May 1946)
- Two Orders of the Red Banner (25 October 1943 and 22 May 1945)
- Two Orders of the Patriotic War 1st class (26 April 1944 and 11 March 1985)
- Two Orders of the Red Star (9 September 1945 and 30 December 1956)
- Medal "For Battle Merit" (19 November 1951)
- campaign and jubilee medals

== Commemoration ==
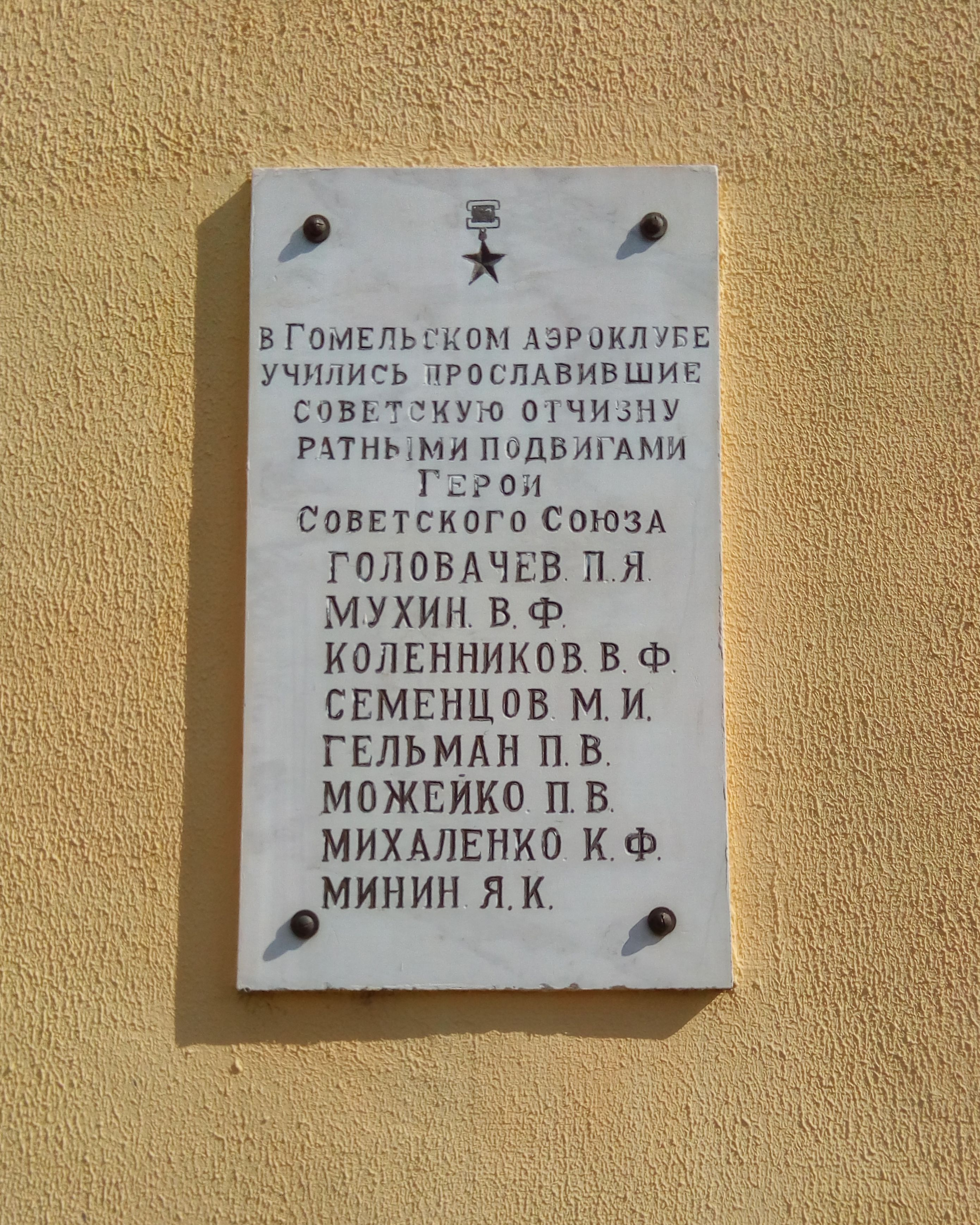
Memorial plaque commemorating the Heroes of the Soviet Union who studied at the Gomel Aero Club.

One of the streets in Berdychiv is named after Polina Gelman.

By decision of the Toponymic Commission under the Gomel City Executive Committee, the 3rd projected street in the 59th microdistrict “Shvedskaya Gorka” in Gomel was named after Polina Gelman.

A memorial plaque on the building of the school where she studied, in Gomel.

A memorial plaque on the building of the regional DOSAAF organization in Gomel.

A stele honoring P. V. Gelman has been installed on the Alley of Heroes in Gomel, on Sovetskaya Street.

== See also ==
- 46th Guards Night Bomber Regiment
- List of female Heroes of the Soviet Union
- List of Jewish Heroes of the Soviet Union
- Polikarpov Po-2
