= Khiuaz Dospanova =

Soviet pilot and navigator (1922–2008)

- Хиуаз Доспанова
- Born: 15 May 1922; Ganyushkino, Turkestan ASSR
- Died: 20 May 2008 (aged 86); Almaty, Kazakhstan
- Spouse: Shaku Amirov
- Military career
- Allegiance: Soviet Union
- Branch: Soviet Air Force
- Service years: 1942–1945
- Rank: Senior lieutenant
- Unit: 46th Guards Night Bomber Regiment
- Conflicts: World War II
- Awards: Hero of Kazakhstan

Khiuaz Qayrqyzy Dospanova (Russian: Хиуаз Каировна Доспанова, romanized: Khiuaz Kairovna Dospanova; Kazakh: Хиуаз Қайырқызы Доспанова; 15 May 1922 – 20 May 2008) was a Soviet pilot and navigator who served during World War II in the 588th Night Bomber Regiment, nicknamed the "Night Witches". In addition to being the first ethnically Kazakh woman officer in the Soviet Air Force, she was the only Kazakh woman to serve in the "Night Witches".

Despite sustaining multiple fractures in her legs in a ground collision in 1943, she returned to active duty and continued to participate in sorties against doctor's recommendations; she was eventually awarded the title Hero of Kazakhstan in 2004 for her perseverance, and Atyrau International Airport is named in her honor.

== Early life ==
Born in Atyrau, present-day Kazakhstan, from her early childhood she dreamed of becoming a pilot. After completing secondary school she became certified as a reserve pilot. When World War II started she applied to the Zhukovsky Air Force Academy in Moscow, but her application was denied because the academy was for males only; she entered a medical institute instead in 1941.

== Military career ==
When she heard of the recently formed all-female aviation regiments commanded by Marina Raskova, she applied to the aviation college in Saratov. In 1942 she was placed in the 588th Night Bomber Regiment under the command of experienced pilot Yevdokia Bershanskaya; the unit was later awarded the Guards designation and renamed as the 46th Guards Night Bomber Aviation Regiment.

While landing after a mission on 1 April 1943, the Polikarpov Po-2 Dospanova and pilot Yuliya Pashkova were flying was hit by the plane of Polina Makagon and Lydia Svistunova. Both pilots in the other plane were killed in the crash and Pashkova died during surgery; Dospanova was assumed to be dead after not moving for a while, but nurses eventually realized she was still alive because she was not showing signs of pallor mortis long after they assumed her to be dead, so she underwent a series of surgeries over several days. Her legs developed gangrene, but one doctor refused to amputate her legs, saying that she would need them. Dospanova had to wear casts on both of her legs for weeks and walked with a cane quite a while after the casts were removed. Six months later she returned to her unit, but was soon promoted to work as regiment's head of communications, since she continued to have difficulty using her legs, resulting in her needing assistance getting in and out of aircraft. Nevertheless, she still flew as navigator in combat missions, and tallied an estimated 300 sorties by the end of the war, taking part in the battles throughout Eastern Europe including in the Caucasus, Kuban, Taman, Crimea, Poland, and Germany.

== Postwar ==
Initially Dospanova considered returning to medical school, but after meeting first secretary of the West Kazakhstan regional party committee Minaidar Salin, she decided to work for the communist party instead. She held a variety of positions in the government including secretary of the Presidium of the Supreme Soviet of the Kazakh SSR. After retiring early due to her poor health she lived in Almaty, where she died on 20 May 2008.

== Awards ==
- Hero of Kazakhstan (7 December 2004)
- Order of Otan (7 December 2004)
- Order of the Patriotic War 1st class (11 March 1985)
- Order of the Patriotic War 2nd class (22 February 1944)
- Order of the Red Star (26 December 1942)
- Order of the Red Banner of Labor (28 October 1948)
- Medal "Veteran of Labour" (1974)
- campaign and jubilee medals

== Recognition ==
An ice rink and Embraer 190 of Air Astana bear her name; Atyrau International Airport is named in her honor.

== See also ==
- List of female Heroes of the Soviet Union
- Zuleykha Seyidmammadova
- Aliya Moldagulova
- Manshuk Mametova
- Alexey Maresyev
- Douglas Bader
