= Yevdokiya Nikulina =

Soviet pilot and Hero of the Soviet Union (1917–1993)

Yevdokiya Andreyevna Nikulina
- Евдокия Андреевна Никулина
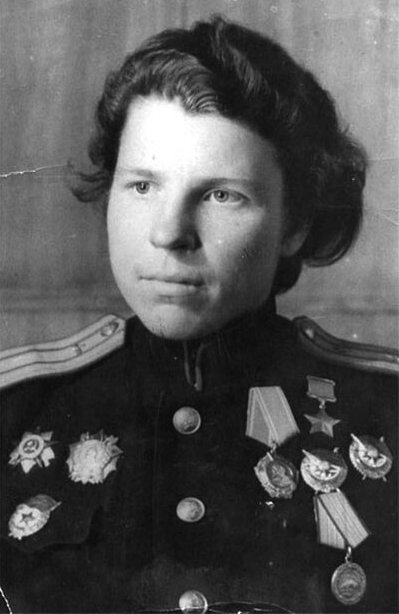
- Born: 8 November [O.S. 26 October] 1917; Parfyonovo, Spas-Demensky District, Kaluga Oblast, Russian SFSR
- Died: 23 March 1993 (aged 76); Rostov-on-Don, Russian Federation
- Military career
- Allegiance: Soviet Union
- Branch: Soviet Air Force
- Service years: 1941–1945
- Rank: Guard Major
- Unit: 46th Taman Guards Night Bomber Aviation Regiment
- Conflicts: World War II
- Awards: Hero of the Soviet Union

Yevdokiya Andreyevna Nikulina (Russian: Евдокия Андреевна Никулина; 8 November [O.S. 26 October] 1917 – 23 March 1993) was a squadron commander in the 46th Taman Guards Night Bomber Aviation Regiment who was awarded the title Hero of the Soviet Union on 26 October 1944.

== Early life ==
Nikulina was born on 8 November [O.S. 26 October] 1917 in the village of Parfyonovo to a large Russian peasant family; she had seven siblings. After completing her seventh grade of education in a rural school she moved to the city of Podolsk with her brother Fyodor, where she worked at a cement factory after graduating from trade school in 1933. Upon unsuccessfully attempting to enroll in the Podolsk aeroclub in 1934, she applied to the Balashov School of Pilots and Aircraft Technicians of the Civil Air Fleet, where she trained to become a mechanic for two years before transferring to the Bataysk School of the Civil Air Fleet in early 1936. After graduating from flight school in 1938 she worked as a pilot for the 205th Special Operations Squadron of the Moscow branch of the Civil Air Fleet, where she was tasked with crop dusting, delivering mail, and flying air ambulances, accumulating over 500 flight hours before the start of the war.

== Military career ==
After joining the Red Army in 1941 and completing her training, she was deployed to the Eastern front of the war as a squadron commander. In her duties, she defended the Southern, Transcaucasus, North Caucasus, and the 2nd Belarusian fronts.

Upon the German invasion of the Soviet Union, Nikulina was deployed to the front as a pilot in the Special Belarusian Aviation Group of the Civil Air Fleet, where she remained until in December 1941 she entered the women's aviation group founded by Marina Raskova. During those early months of the war she flew a variety of missions on the Polikarpov R-5 and Polikarpov Po-2, transporting wounded soldiers, conducting reconnaissance, and delivering information. Upon departing the Civil Air Fleet she began training at Engels Military Aviation School; initially she was assigned to the 587th Dive Bomber Aviation Regiment in February 1942, which used the Po-2, but in May she was reassigned to the 588th Night Bomber Aviation Regiment as a deputy squadron commander due to her previous experience flying the Po-2 (used by the night bomber regiment) in combat. The regiment, which participated in bombing campaigns on the Southern, Transcaucasus, North Caucasus, 4th Ukrainian, and 2nd Belarusian fronts, was honored with the guards designation in 1943 and renamed as the 46th Guards Night Bomber Regiment. Soon after deploying to the Southern Front she was promoted to squadron commander to replace Lyubov Okhlovskaya, who was killed in action on 18 June 1942 during the regiment's first night of combat. Nikulina herself was wounded during a sortie over the Caucasus after her aircraft was hit with shrapnel from an anti-aircraft shell; despite shrapnel puncturing the fuel tank and her navigator losing consciousness, she managed to safely make an emergency landing in Soviet-controlled territory. After being treated for her injuries she returned to combat, and for totaling 345 sorties by September 1943 she was nominated for the title Hero of the Soviet Union, but was awarded the Order of Alexander Nevsky instead, making her one of only nine women to have received it. She was re-nominated for the title in September 1944, by then having totaled 600 sorties, and was awarded the title on 26 October that year. By the end of the war her total had reached 740 sorties, dropping 105 tons of bombs, destroying two anti-aircraft artillery points, two searchlights, three crossings, one railway section, and causing 177 major explosions.

== Later life ==
After the war she left active duty, joining the reserve before retiring. In 1948 she graduated the Rostov-on-Don Communist Party School and graduated from the Rostov-on-Don Pedagogical Institute in 1954. She worked in the local party committee until she retired and lived the remainder of her life in Rostov-on-Don.

Nikulina and her four-year-old granddaughter were attacked by robbers in her home on 2 July 1992. She recovered from the attack but died soon after on 23 March 1993. There have been false reports of her being murdered in her home.

In 2015 she was honored with a star on the "Alley Of Heroes" in Rostov-On-Don.

== Awards ==
- Hero of the Soviet Union (26 October 1944)
- Order of Lenin (26 October 1944)
- Three Orders of the Red Banner (9 September 1942, 26 April 1944, and 15 June 1945)
- Order of Alexander Nevsky (25 October 1943)
- Two Order of the Patriotic War (1st class - 11 March 1985; 2nd class - 27 April 1943)
- campaign and jubilee medals

== See also ==
- List of female Heroes of the Soviet Union
- Polikarpov Po-2
