= Night Witches =

All-women Soviet aviation unit

588th Night Bomber Regiment (1942–1943) 46th Guards Night Bomber Aviation Regiment (1943–1945)
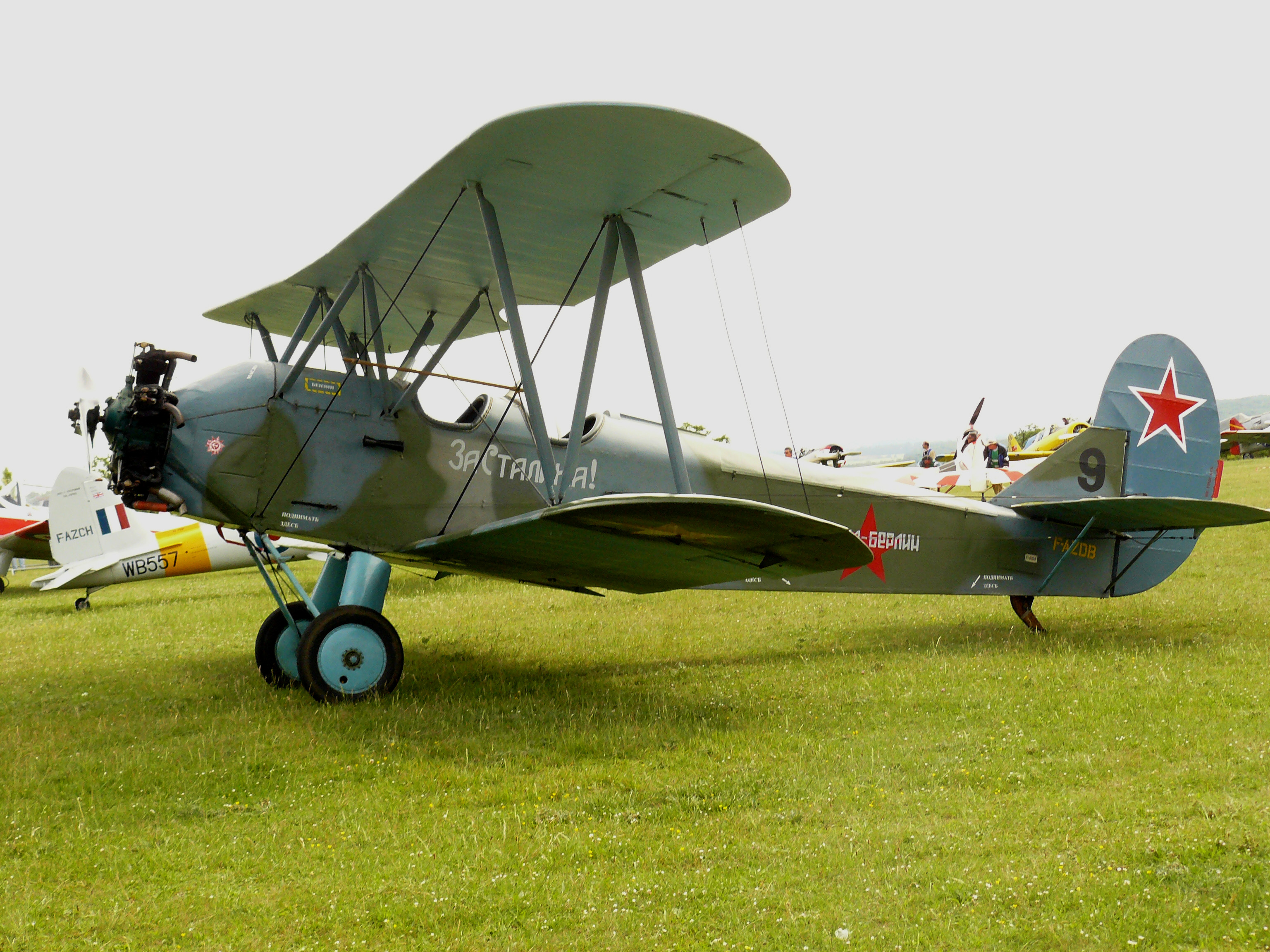
- A Polikarpov Po-2, the aircraft type used by the regiment
- Active: 1942–1945
- Country: Soviet Union
- Branch: Soviet Air Forces
- Role: Harassment and tactical bombing
- Nickname: Night Witches
- Engagements: World War II; Eastern Front
- Decorations: Guards designation Order of the Red Banner; Order of Suvorov

Commanders
- Regimental Commander: Yevdokiya Bershanskaya
- Deputy Regiment Commander: Serafima Amosova
- Commissar: Yevdokiya Rachkevich

Aircraft flown
- Bomber: Polikarpov Po-2

"Night Witches" (Note: German: die Nachthexen; Russian: Ночные ведьмы, romanized: Nochnyye vedmy) was a World War II nickname for the all-female military aviators of the 588th Night Bomber Regiment, (Note: Russian: 588-й ночной легкобомбардировочный авиационный полк, romanized: 588-y nochnoy legkobombardirovochnyy aviatsionnyy polk) known later as the 46th "Taman" Guards Night Bomber Aviation Red Banner and Order of Suvorov Regiment, (Note: Russian: 46-й гвардейский ночной бомбардировочный авиационный Таманский Краснознамённый и ордена Суворова полк, romanized: 46-y gvardeyskiy nochnoy bombardirovochnyy aviatsionnyy Tamanskiy Krasnoznamonnyy i ordena Suvorova polk) of the Soviet Air Forces.

Major Marina Raskova used her position and personal contacts with the Soviet leader Joseph Stalin to obtain permission to form female combat units. Combat facilitated and ushered in a reluctant acceptance of women in the military, based more upon practicality and necessity than for equality. On October 8, 1941, an order was issued to deploy three women's air-force units, including the 588th Regiment. The regiment, formed by Raskova and led by Major Yevdokiya Bershanskaya, was composed primarily of female volunteers in their late teens and early twenties.

An attack technique of the night bombers involved idling the engine near the target and gliding to the bomb-release point with only wind noise left to reveal their presence. Allegedly, German soldiers likened the sound to broomsticks and hence named the pilots "Night Witches". Due to the weight of the bombs and the low altitude of flight, the pilots did not carry parachutes until 1944.

When the regiment was deployed on the front line in June 1942, the 588th Night Bomber Regiment became part of the 4th Air Army of the Southern Front. In February 1943 the regiment was honored with the Guards designation and reorganized as the 46th Guards Night Bomber Aviation Regiment in the 325th Night Bomber Aviation Division, 4th Air Army, 2nd Belorussian Front; in October 1943 it became the 46th "Taman" Guards Night Bomber Aviation Regiment, "Taman" referring to the unit's involvement in the Novorossiysk-Taman operations on the Taman Peninsula during 1943.

== Conception ==
In October 1941, Major Marina Raskova was granted authority to select candidates for the 122nd Composite Air Group, an all-female aviation regiment. Raskova had already established several world records in long-distance non-stop flights and was referred to as the "Russian Amelia Earhart" for her achievements.

When the Germans invaded in 1941, young women began writing Raskova letters, asking how they could best serve their country using their flight skills. Raskova used her personal connection with Stalin to obtain approval to establish the regiment.

Stalin was quick to approve of the initiative, as he had a general interest in the women's "tremendous international propaganda value."

== History and tactics ==
The regiment flew harassment and precision bombing missions against the German military from 1942 until the end of the Second World War (1945). At its largest, it had 40 two-person crews. The regiment flew over 23,000 sorties, dropping over 3,000 tons of bombs and 26,000 incendiary shells. It was the most highly decorated female unit in the Soviet Air Force, with many pilots having flown over 800 missions by the end of the war and twenty-three having been awarded the Hero of the Soviet Union title. Thirty-two of its members died during the war.

The regiment flew in steel-and-canvas Polikarpov U-2 biplanes, a 1928 design intended for use as training aircraft (hence its original uchebnyy designation prefix of "U-") and for crop dusting, which also had a special U-2LNB version for the sort of night harassment attack missions flown by the 588th. The plane could carry only 350 kilograms (770 lb) of bombs, so eight or more missions per night were often necessary. Although the aircraft was obsolete and slow, the pilots took advantage of its exceptional maneuverability; it also had a maximum speed that was lower than the stalling speed of both the Messerschmitt Bf 109 and the Focke-Wulf Fw 190, which made it very difficult for German pilots to shoot down, with the exception of fighter ace Josef Kociok, who grounded the regiment for an entire night by shooting down three or four of their planes on the night of 31 July – 1 August 1943.

== Timeline and operations ==
Members of the regiment were deployed from the Engels Military Aviation School to the Southern Front as part of the 218th Division of the 4th Air Army on 23 May 1942, where they arrived on 27 May.

- 12 June 1942: The regiment's baptism by fire took place on the Southern front in bombings of river crossings on the Mius, Donets, and Don rivers as well as roads in the Sal steppes and Stavropol suburbs.
- August – December 1942: In the Battle of the Caucasus, the regiment defended the city of Vladikavkaz as well as bombing enemy equipment and troops in Digora, Mozdok, and Prokhladnaya.
- January 1943: Assisted in the breakthrough of enemy defensive lines on the Terek River as well as offensive operations against ground troops in the Kuban River valley and Stavropol.
- March – September 1943: Assisted in the breakthrough of the Kuban bridgehead and the liberation of Novorossiysk.
- April – July 1943: Participated in an aerial campaign over Kuban.
- November 1943 – May 1944: Provided air support to ground troops in the Kerch–Eltigen Operation as part of the Crimean Offensive and in the city of Sevastopol.
- June – July 1944: Bombed enemy fortifications along the Pronya River, helping to take control of Białystok, Cherven, Minsk, and Mogilev in Byelorussia.
- August 1944: Operations over Poland in campaigns to expel the Germans from the cities of Augustów, Warsaw, and Ostrołęka.
- January 1945: Participated in the East Prussian Offensive.
- March 1945: Participated in offensives over Gdynia and Gdansk.
- April – May 1945: Assisted in the Vistula–Oder Offensive.
- 15 October 1945: The regiment was disbanded following the end of the war and service members were demobilized.

== Sorties/missions ==
Throughout the course of the war the regiment accumulated approximately 23,672 sorties in combat, including in the following battles:

- Battle of the Caucasus – 2,920 sorties
- Kuban, Taman, Novorossiysk – 4,623 sorties
- Crimean Offensive – 6,140 sorties
- Belarus Offensive – 400 sorties
- Poland Offensive – 5,421 sorties
- German Offensive – 2,000 sorties

In total the regiment collectively accumulated 28,676 flight hours, dropped over 3,000 tons of bombs and over 26,000 incendiary shells, damaging or completely destroying 17 river crossings, nine railways, two railway stations, 26 warehouses, 12 fuel depots, 176 armored cars, 86 firing points, and 11 searchlights. In addition to bombings, the unit performed 155 supply drops of food and ammunition to Soviet forces.

== Personnel ==
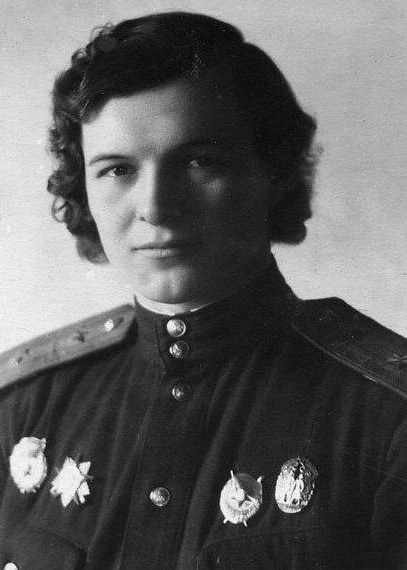
Yevdokiya Bershanskaya, regimental commander.

In total, 261 people served in the regiment, of whom 32 died of various causes during the war including plane crashes, combat deaths and tuberculosis. Twenty-eight aircraft were written off.

=== Leadership ===
- Yevdokiya Bershanskaya – regiment commander
- Serafima Amosova – deputy regiment commander
- Yevdokiya Rachkevich – commissar
- Maria Fortus and later Irina Rakobolskaya – chief of staff
- Valentina Stupina and later Khiuaz Dospanova – head of communications

== Longstanding effects ==
=== Disciplined personnel ===
Senior Engineer Sofiya Ozerkova destroyed her party card in case of capture during a retreat from an encircled airbase after she had chosen to stay behind to deny the German Army a Po-2 undergoing repairs. Following her return to the Regiment she was sentenced to death by a military tribunal in 1942 because she could not produce the card. She refused to appeal the sentence as a show of loyalty to the party, but was later acquitted after the political commissar attached to the unit intervened on her behalf. Her sentence was suspended and she was reinstated to her position. Mechanics Raisa Kharitonova and Tamara Frolova were sentenced to ten years of imprisonment for dismantling a flare (used by navigators to illuminate bombing targets) and using the small silk parachutes to sew undergarments. Both of them were retrained as navigators, but Frolova was killed in action in 1943.

=== Honored personnel ===
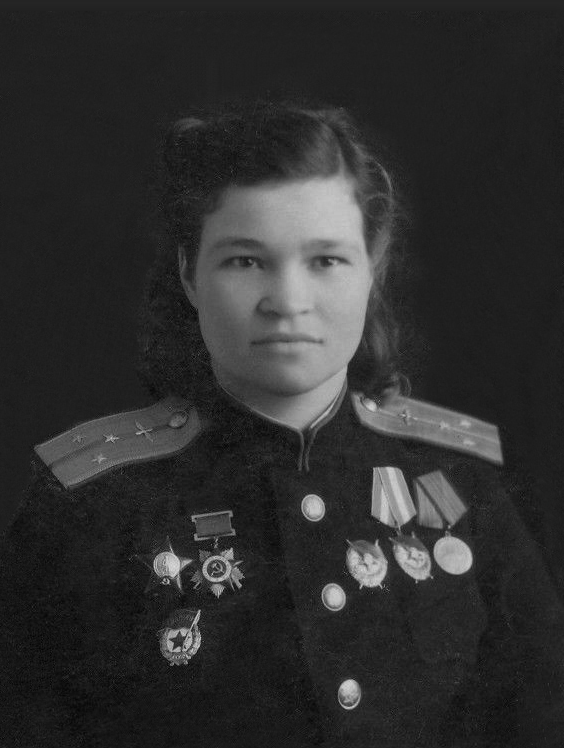
Irina Sebrova flew 1,008 sorties in the war, more than any other member of the regiment.

Twenty-three personnel from the regiment were awarded the title Hero of the Soviet Union, two were awarded Hero of the Russian Federation, and one was awarded Hero of Kazakhstan.

==== Heroes of the Soviet Union ====
- Raisa Aronova
- Vera Belik †
- Marina Chechneva
- Rufina Gasheva
- Polina Gelman
- Tatyana Makarova †
- Natalya Meklin
- Yevdokiya Nikulina
- Yevdokiya Nosal †
- Olga Sanfirova †
- Zoya Parfenova
- Yevdokia Pasko
- Nadezhda Popova
- Nina Raspopova
- Yevgeniya Rudneva †
- Yekaterina Ryabova
- Irina Sebrova
- Mariya Smirnova
- Maguba Syrtlanova
- Nina Ulyanenko
- Yevgeniya Zhigulenko

==== Heroes of the Russian Federation ====
- Aleksandra Akimova
- Tatyana Sumarokova

==== Hero of Kazakhstan ====
- Khiuaz Dospanova

== Post-War life ==
In 1917, Russia became the first country to declare legal equality for women, which allowed them to enter military service. Women were inherently equal to men in both rights and responsibilities, as social equality was a fundamental part of the Communist ideology. After World War II, however, women in Russia were treated as they always had been, especially before the 1917 law was passed. A common dilemma for these women grew out of the social pressures compelling them to place more importance on the family instead of an aviation or military career.

Irina Rakobolskaya, pilot with the 588th Regiment, rationalized the difficult reality and challenges she faced to pursue both a family and piloting career when she stated, “I think that during the war, when the fate of our country was being decided, the bringing in of women into aviation was justified. But in peacetime a woman can only fly for sport...otherwise how can one combine a career with a family and with maternal happiness?”

== Other women's regiments ==
On 8 October 1941, Order number 0099 specified the creation of three women's regiments—all personnel from technicians to pilots would be entirely composed of women. The other two regiments were the 586th Fighter Aviation Regiment, which used Yak-1 fighters, and the 587th Bomber Aviation Regiment, which used twin engine Pe-2 dive bombers. Later the unit received the Guards designation and reorganized as the 125th Guards Bomber Aviation Regiment. Although all three regiments had been planned to have women exclusively, none remained all-female. The 586th and 588th Regiments employed male mechanics, the 586th because no women had received training to work on the Yakovlev fighter planes before the war.

The 586th's woman commander, Major Tamara Aleksandrovna Kazarinova, was replaced by a man, Major Aleksandr Vasilievich Gridnev, in October 1942. The 587th Regiment was originally under the command of Marina Raskova, but after her death in 1943, a male commanding officer, Major Valentin Markov, replaced her. The 587th's Petlyakov Pe-2 dive bombers also required a tall person to operate the top rear machine gun, but not enough women recruited were tall enough, requiring some men to join the aircrews as radio operator and tail gunner. The 588th Regiment's staff driver and searchlight operatives were also male.

== In popular culture ==
- The Night Witches inspired the song "Night Witches" by Swedish power metal band Sabaton.
- The tabletop role-playing game "Night Witches" by Jason Morningstar unites contemporary gender issues with Soviet war drama where players portray these night witches.
- A fictional but realistic member of the Nachthexen, Ludmila Gorbunova, is one of the leading characters in Harry Turtledove's Worldwar series of alternate-history science fiction novels.
- Varvara Sidorovna Tamonina, one of the recurring characters in Ben Aaronovitch's Rivers of London spin-off graphics novels, starting with "Night Witch #1", was a member of the fictional 365th Special Regiment of the Red Army a.k.a. Night Witches formed of women with supernatural powers, not aviators but a clear reference to the Night Witches.

== See also ==
- Luftwaffen-Legion Lettland, a German night harassment unit on the Eastern Front during the war (outside of the usual Störkampfstaffel squadrons and Nachtschlachtgruppe groups for such duties)
- Washing Machine Charlie, the term for Japanese night harassment aircraft during the Guadalcanal Campaign and later
- 1077th Anti-Aircraft Regiment, a Soviet regiment that fought in the Battle of Stalingrad composed predominantly of young female volunteers

== Bibliography ==
- Cottam, Kazimiera Janina (1998). Women in War and Resistance: Selected Biographies of Soviet Women Soldiers. Newburyport, MA: Focus Publishing/R. Pullins Co. ISBN 1-58510-160-5.
- Cruz, Alberto (2013). Las brujas de la noche. El 46 Regimiento Taman de aviadoras soviéticas en la II Guerra Mundial [The witches of the night. The 46th Taman Regiment of Soviet Airmen in World War II] (in Spanish). La Caída. ISBN 9788461662296.
- Magid, Aleksandr (1960). Гвардейский Таманский авиационный полк [Guards Taman Aviation Regiment] (in Russian). Moscow: DOSLAF. OCLC 881535802.
- Noggle, Anne (1994). A Dance With Death: Soviet Airwomen in World War II. College Station, TX: Texas A&M University Press. ISBN 0890966028. OCLC 474018127.
- Pennington, Reina (1997). Wings, Women, and War: Soviet Airwomen in World War II Combat. University Press of Kansas. ISBN 0-7006-1554-7.
- Rakobolskaya, Irina; Kravtsova, Natalya (2005). Нас называли ночными ведьмами: так воевал женский 46-й гвардейский полк ночных бомбардировщиков [We were called night witches: this is how the female 46th Guards regiment of night bombers fought]. Moscow: University of Moscow Press. ISBN 5211050088. OCLC 68044852.
- Sakaida, Henry (2003). Heroines of the Soviet Union: 1941–45. Osprey Publishing. ISBN 978-1-84176-598-3.
