= Yevdokiya Bershanskaya =

Soviet Air Force officer (1913–1982)

- Евдокия Давыдовна Бершанская
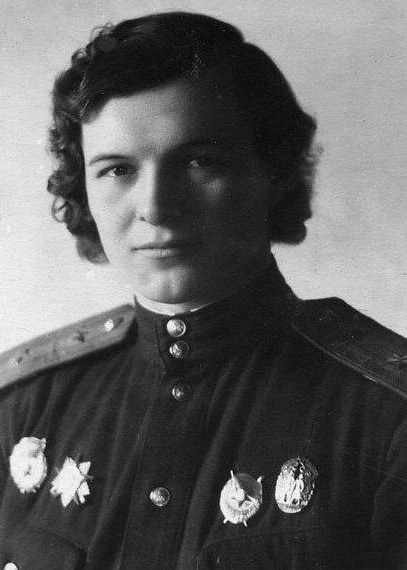
- Born: Yevdokia Davidovna Karbut; 6 February 1913; Dobrovolnoye, Stavropol Governorate, Russian Empire
- Died: 16 September 1982 (aged 69); Moscow, Soviet Union
- Military career
- Allegiance: Soviet Union
- Branch: Soviet Air Force
- Rank: Lieutenant Colonel
- Units: 588th Night Bomber Regiment (later renamed the 46th Guards Night Bomber Regiment)
- Conflicts: World War II
- Awards: Order of Suvorov 3rd Class

Yevdokiya Davidovna Bershanskaya (Russian: Евдокия Давыдовна Бершанская; 6 February 1913, in Dobrovolnoye, Stavropol – 16 September 1982, in Moscow) was the commander of the 46th Taman Guards Night Bomber Aviation Regiment during World War II and became the only woman ever awarded the Order of Suvorov. Under her command twenty-three aviators in the regiment became Heroes of the Soviet Union for their successful bombing missions against the Axis.

== Early life ==
Bershanskaya was born on 6 February 1913 in Dobrovolnoye, in what was then the Russian Empire. After both of her parents died in the Russian Civil War she was raised by her uncle. After graduating from secondary school in Blagodarny she enrolled in the Bataysk School of Pilots in 1931, where after graduating she trained other pilots from 1932 to 1939, before she was appointed as commander of the 218th Special Operations Aviation Squadron and became a deputy of the Krasnodar City Council. Before the German invasion of the Soviet Union she married Pyotr Bershansky with whom she had a son, but their marriage quickly fell apart. She continued using the surname Bershanskaya until she married her second husband, Konstantin Bocharov, after the end of the war.

== World War II ==
In 1941, Marina Raskova gained Stalin's approval to form three women's aviation regiments: the 586th Fighter Aviation Regiment, the 587th Bomber Aviation Regiment and the 588th Night Bomber Regiment. As a pilot with ten years of experience, Bershanskaya was chosen to lead the 588th Night Bomber Regiment, which flew Polikarpov Po-2 biplanes. In 1943, the regiment received the Guards designations and was reorganized as the 46th Guards Night Bomber Aviation Regiment. Later she was awarded the Order of the Red Banner. The women pilots were so fierce and accurate that the German soldiers began calling them Night Witches. They were called this because often during missions they would bring the engines of their planes down to idle speed and glide over their targets before dropping their bombs and bringing the engine back to full power. From its formation until its disbandment in October 1945, the regiment remained totally female. Collectively, they flew over 23,000 sorties, and dropped over 3,000 tons of bombs on enemy forces.

In addition to twenty-three members of the regiment receiving the title Hero of the Soviet Union, two were eventually declared Heroes of Russia, and one was awarded the title Hero of Kazakhstan.

External image
- Headstone

== Later life ==
After the war, Yevdokia married Konstantin Bocharov, the commander of the 889th Light Night Bomber Aviation Regiment, which had worked closely with the 46th Guards Night Bomber Regiment during the war where they had met. The wedding was attended by many members of their regiments. Together they had three daughters. In 1975, she was awarded the title of Honorary Citizen of Krasnodar. She lived in Moscow where she died of a heart attack in 1982 and was buried at Novodevichy Cemetery.

== Awards and honors ==
- Order of the Red Banner (twice)
- Order of Suvorov 3rd Class
- Order of Alexander Nevsky
- Order of the Patriotic War 2nd Class
- Order of the Badge of Honor
- Campaign and Jubilee medals

== Memory ==
On May 7, 1988, a monument to her was unveiled at Krasnodar Airport.

In 2005, the Kuban airlines named one of its Yak-42 aircraft “Yevdokiya Bershanskaya.”

In 2017, a monument to E. D. Bershanskaya was unveiled in Stavropol, near the building of the former pedagogical college where she studied (8 Morozova Street).
