= Mikhail Taratuta =

- Born: Mikhail Anatolyevich Taratuta; 2 June 1948 (age 77); Moscow, RSFSR, USSR
- Occupation: Journalist
- Years active: 1970–present
- Spouse: Marina Taratuta
- Children: 1

Mikhail Anatolyevich Taratuta (Russian: Михаи́л Анато́льевич Тарату́та; born 2 June 1948, Moscow) is a Russian journalist, analyst and chronicler of American life. Author and presenter of the popular TV program America with Mikhail Taratuta.

== Biography ==
Mikhail Taratuta was born on 2 June 1948 in Moscow. In 1972 he graduated from Moscow State Linguistic University on the specialty of a translator-referent (with knowledge of English and Swedish).

In 1970, while still a student, he was sent to Egypt, where he was an interpreter of the Soviet military adviser. In 1972 (after graduation) he was drafted into the army, becoming an officer-interpreter in Bangladesh. Since 1974, Mikhail worked for the International broadcasting.

From 1988 to 2000, Mikhail Taratuta was in the United States, where he was first a correspondent of the program Vremya, and then the author of the program America with Mikhail Taratuta. In total they included about 1000 reports about the United States.

Since 2000, Mikhail Taratuta has worked in Russia, mainly in the production of documentary films and autobiographical books. In addition, for some time on NTV, and then on the Russia Сhannel came out the author's program Taratuta Russian Hills. 2002–2011 – President of the MITACOM Foundation (Producer Center).

Since 2016 he has been taking part in the social and political talk show 60 Minutes on the channel Russia-1.

== Family ==
- Wife – Marina, lawyer (corporate and family law)
- Daughter – Ekaterina Taratuta, script writer, translator, journalist
- Son-in-law – Vladislav Druzhinin, director
- Brother – Emelyan Zakharov, businessman

== Bibliography ==
- 1985 – Soviet Democracy: A Discussion
- 2004 – America with Mikhail Taratuta
- 2006 – American Chronicles, or Introduction to Capitalism
