= Dimitri Petrov =

Dimitri Petrov may refer to:

- Dimitri Petrov (cross-country skier)
- Dimitri Petrov (artist)

== See also ==
- Dmitry Petrov (disambiguation)
