= Who Are the Mind Benders? =

1997 conspiracy publication by Nick Griffin

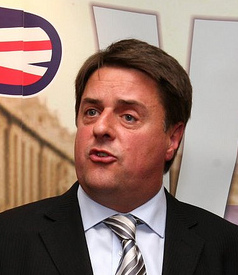
Nick Griffin (pictured) wrote Who are the Mind Benders? prior to becoming leader of the British National Party.

Who are the Mind Benders?: The people who rule Britain through control of the mass media is a 1997 publication by Nick Griffin which was printed and distributed by the British National Party. The booklet outlines a Jewish conspiracy whereby Jews control the media in Britain and use this position to brainwash the [white] British population. Griffin claims for instance that Jews are responsible for “providing us with an endless diet of pro-multiracial, pro-homosexual, anti-British trash”.

The booklet is based upon the American neo-Nazi William Pierce's work Who Rules America? and the anti-Semitic forgery the Protocols of the Elders of Zion. Who are the Mind Benders? has been criticised for its overtly antisemitic content. Prominent Jews mentioned as forming part of a conspiracy include Alan Yentob, Michael Grade, Jeremy Isaacs and the supposedly part-Jewish Rupert Murdoch.

According to the scholars Nigel Copsey and Graham Macklin, Who are the Mind Benders? was intended to be mailed to thousands of people including "magistrates, local clergymen, sixth-formers, police officers, young journalists and the like". However, few booklets were ever circulated as it fell on party members to bulk purchase copies and identify recipients. Copsey and Macklin also argue that the timing of the publication was also ill-judged as it coincided with the run-up to the 1997 general election when the attention of BNP activists was elsewhere. They wrote that "parts [of the book] were factually inaccurate and the presence of a few hundred Jews working within the media (which employs many thousands) does not in and of itself prove that there is any such conspiracy". Griffin later attempted to distance himself from Mindbenders as he attempted to re-brand the British National Party as a "respectable" modern nationalist party.
