= Konstantin N. Svitnev =

Konstantin Nikolaevich Svitnev
- Константин Свитнев
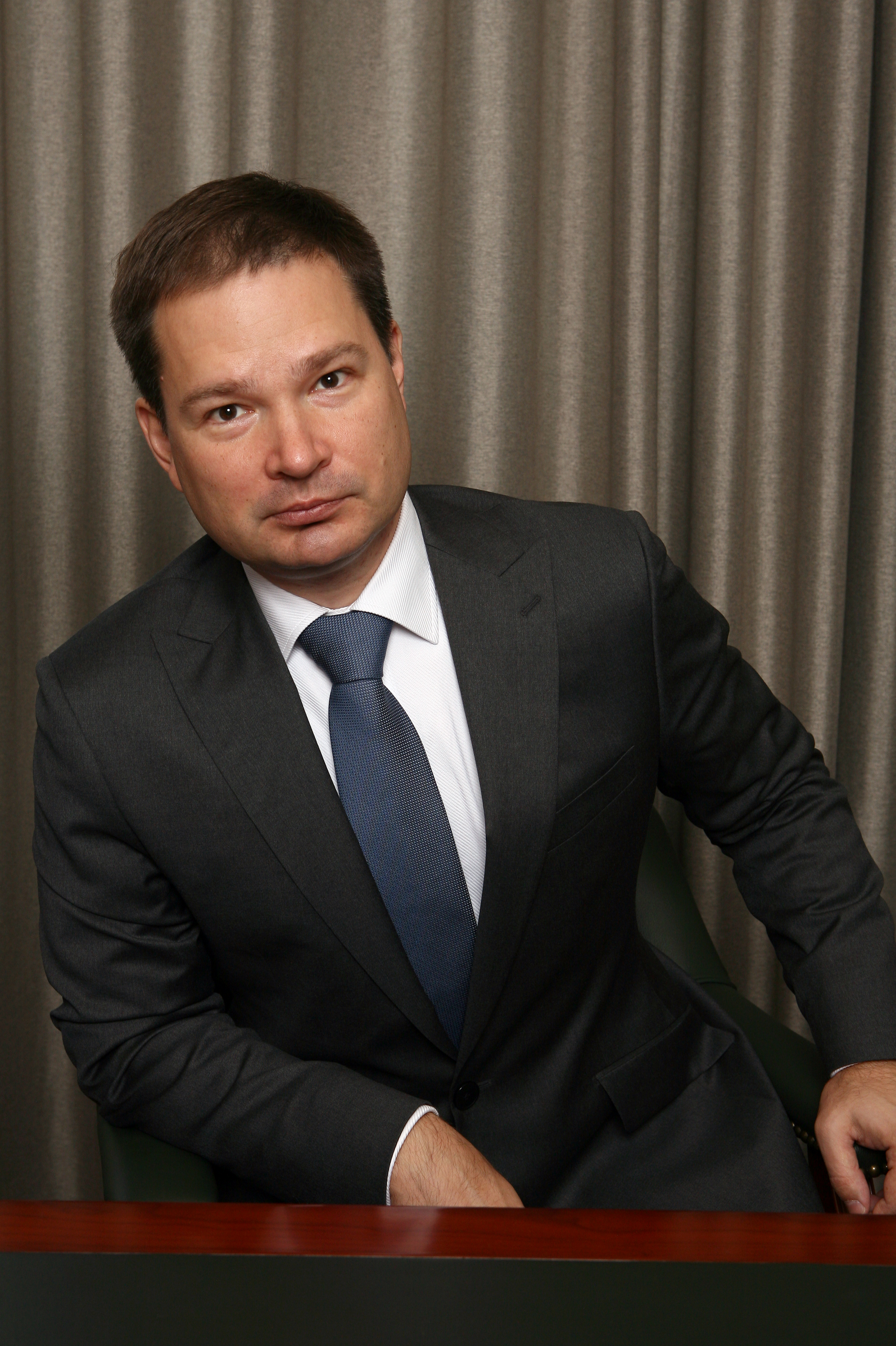
- Official portrait, 2016
- Born: 7 March 1966 (age 60)
- Education: Moscow State Linguistic University; International Law School at the Justice Ministry of Russia
- Title: CEO of Rosjurconsulting
- Website: Official website

Konstantin N. Svitnev is an international reproductive lawyer of Russian origin. Svitnev was born in 1966 and grew up in Moscow. He spent much of his legal career as an advocate for gender equality and reproductive rights.

== Life ==
Svitnev graduated from the Moscow State Linguistics University and International Law Institute at the Ministry of Justice of Russia. In 2003 Svitnev co-founded Rosjurconsulting, an international law firm specialized in reproductive law and third-party reproduction including surrogacy all over the world, the first and only such company in Russia and Europe. He has served as the CEO of Rosjurconsulting since then. He is also the founder of the Reproductive Law and Ethics Research Center.

== Legal achievements ==
Svitnev was the first to prove in the Russian court that single intended parents, women (St. Petersburg, 2009) and men (Moscow, 2010) have the same right to become parents through surrogacy, for which he has been dubbed "the first Russian reprodissident".

== Notable cases ==
In 2009, Svitnev represented Natalia Gorskaya in Gorskaya v Russia in St. Petersburg, which, for the first time in Russia, granted a birth certificate under the name of a single woman who became a mother through surrogacy. The ruling held that single women have the same right to become mothers through surrogacy as married ones.

In August 2010, Svitnev won a case in a Moscow court that ruled in favour of his client, the first Russian man to became a father through surrogacy. Based on the previous victory regarding single women's right to procreate through surrogacy and on article 19 of the Russian Constitution, the court decided that single men have the same right to become fathers through surrogacy in Russia.

In October 2010, Svitnev won a precedent case for Natalia Klimova, a well-known businesswoman from St. Petersburg. After her only son Artiom's death she became a mother and a grandmother at the same time, through surrogacy, using her late son's frozen sperm kept at a local IVF clinic and donated oocytes. The court made the state registration authority (ZAGS) register her newborn son and grandson Egor in her name.

In March 2011, in St. Petersburg, Svitnev represented the first Russian man to father twins through surrogacy, allowing him to be listed as their father and only parent.

In October 2014, Svitnev represented another client at the Supreme Court of Russia, a single man who became a father through surrogacy. The court ruled in favor of Svitnev's client, making it possible for him to be listed as the father and the only parent of his child.

In January 2015, Svitnev won Paradiso and Campanelli v. Italy at the European Court of Human Rights.

== Further references ==
- https://www.economist.com/europe/2021/03/18/russias-liberal-surrogacy-rules-are-under-threat
- https://www.bbc.com/russian/features-54468421
- https://meduza.io/en/feature/2020/10/05/the-invention-of-gay-mutilators
- https://www.bbc.com/russian/features-54301985
- https://www.independent.co.uk/news/world/europe/russia-gay-putin-arrest-lbgt-surrogate-b746395.html
