= Khlestov =

Khlestov (Russian: Хлестов) is a Russian surname. Notable people with the surname include:

- Dmitri Khlestov (born 1971), Russian football player
- Oleg Khlestov (1923–2021), Soviet and Russian diplomat and legal academic
