= Vladimir Yerofeyev =

Vladimir Yerofeyev is the name of:

- Vladimir Yerofeyev (diplomat) (1920–2011), Soviet diplomat
- Vladimir Yakovlevich Yerofeyev (1909–1986), Soviet ambassador
