= Henry Chancellor (filmmaker) =

British television director, producer and writer

Henry Chancellor (born 1968) is a British television director and producer and writer. Born in London, he grew up in East Anglia and went to Trinity College, Cambridge. He lives in Suffolk with his wife, two sons and daughter.

== Bibliography ==
- Scissorman 2018
- The Forgotten Echo: The Remarkable Adventures of Tom Scatterhorn 2012
- The Hidden World: The Remarkable Adventures of Tom Scatterhorn 2010
- The Museum's Secret: The Remarkable Adventures of Tom Scatterhorn 2009
- James Bond The Man and His World. The Official Literary Companion to James Bond 2005
- Colditz: The Definitive History 2001

== Filmography ==
- 1983: The Brink of Apocalypse 2008 Winner of the Grierson Award 2008
- Escape from Colditz: The Best of British 2005
- Battle of the Sexes 2004
- SAS - The Real Story 2003
- St Nazaire Raid 2002
- Commando 2002
- The Golden Age 2001
- Raiders of the Spanish Maine 2001
- CNN Millennium: Century of the Sail 1999
- CNN Millennium: Century of the Axe 1999
- CNN Millennium: Century of the Sword 1999
- Pirates! 1998
- Litter 1997.
- Oil on Canvas 1997. Episodes: Brushstroke, Portrait, Colour
- Seekers of the Lost Treasure: The Great Belzoni 1995.
- The Curse of the Elgin Marbles 1994
- A Time for Tea 1994
- The Van 1993
- The Miller's Tale 1993
