= Irina Sebrova =

Soviet air force officer (1914–2000)

Irina Fyodorovna Sebrova
- Ирина Фёдоровна Себрова
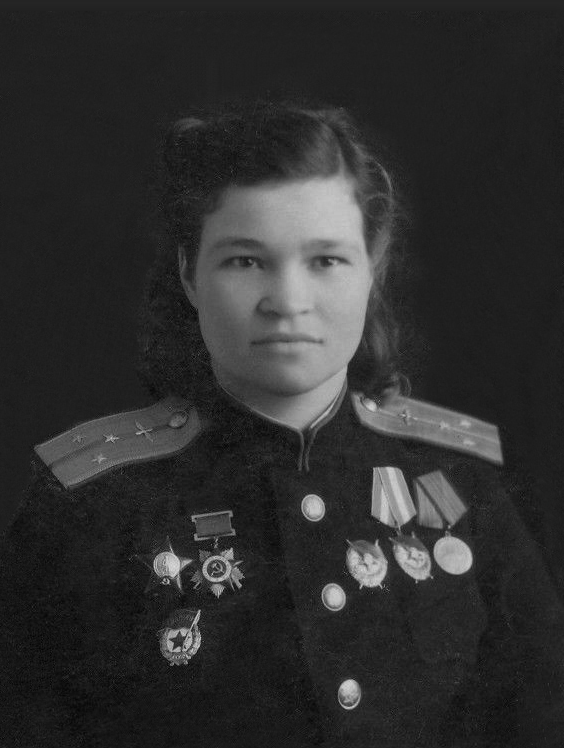
- Born: 25 December [O.S. 12 December] 1914; Tetyakovka, Novomoskovsk, Tula Governorate, Russian Empire
- Died: 5 April 2000 (aged 85); Moscow, Russian Federation
- Military career
- Allegiance: Soviet Union
- Branch: Soviet Air Force
- Service years: 1941–1948
- Rank: Senior lieutenant
- Unit: 46th Taman Guards Night Bomber Aviation Regiment
- Conflicts: World War II
- Awards: Hero of the Soviet Union

Irina Fyodorovna Sebrova (Russian: Ирина Фёдоровна Себрова; 25 December [O.S. 12 December] 1914 – 5 April 2000) was a flight commander in the women's 46th Taman Guards Night Bomber Aviation Regiment, also known as the Night Witches, during the Second World War. She was awarded the title Hero of the Soviet Union on 23 February 1945 for her first 825 bombing missions. By the end of the war she totaled over 1,000 sorties, more than any other female pilot.

== Early life ==
Sebrova was born on 25 December [O.S. 12 December] 1914 to an impoverished Russian family in Tetyakovka, Novomoskovsk; she had five siblings. After completing only five grades of school in 1927 she moved to Moscow, where she graduated from trade school in 1933, becoming a locksmith. Until 1939 she worked as a sewing machine maintenance worker and later as shift foreman at a cardboard factory that made postal boxes. She also attended Voroshilov sharpshooting and nursing courses. Having graduated from the Bauman aeroclub in 1939, she went on to attend the Kherson School of Flight Instructors, graduating in May 1940 before becoming an instructor at the Frunze district aeroclub of Moscow.

== Military career ==
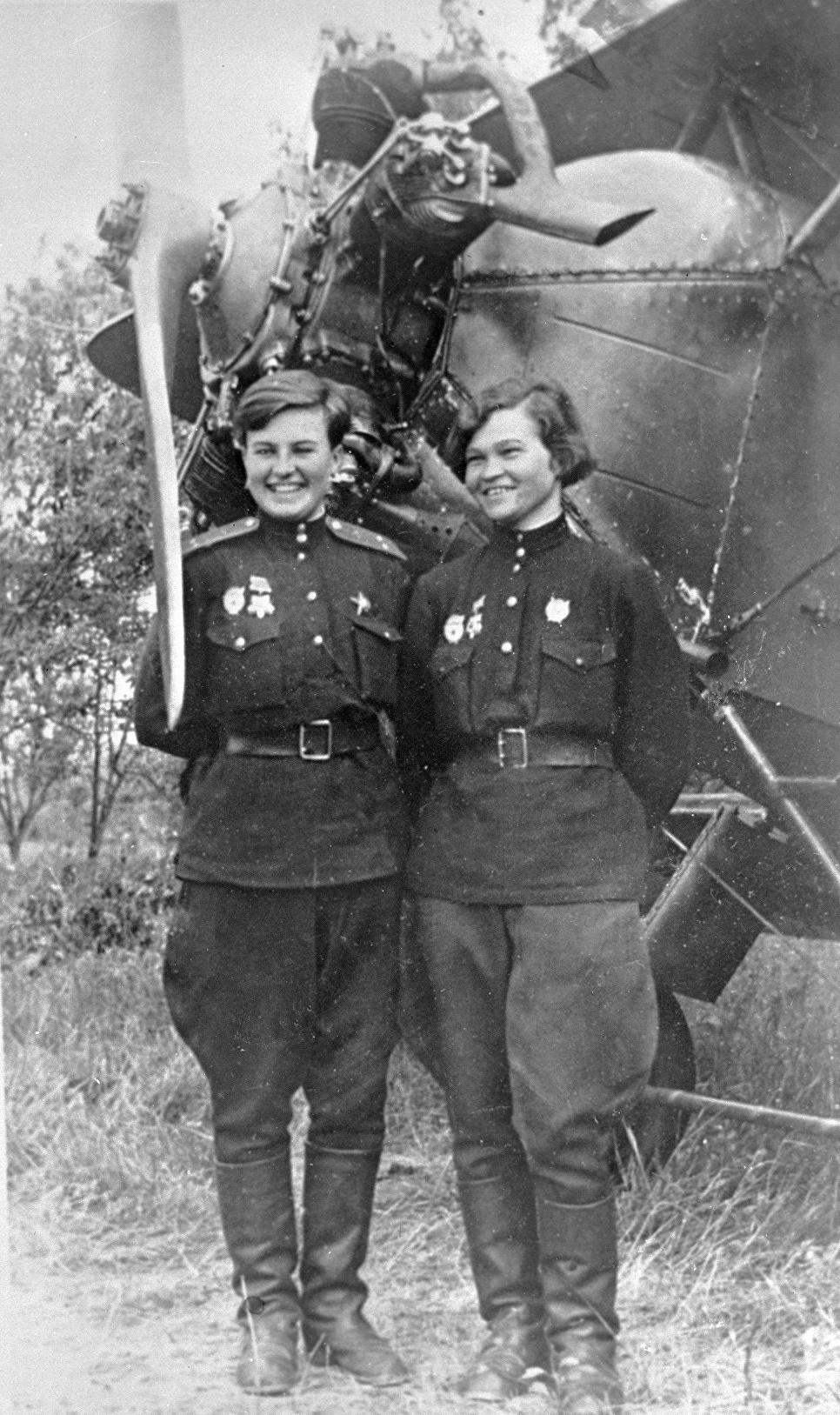
Sebrova (right) and Natalya Meklin by a Po-2, mid-1943

After the German invasion of the Soviet Union and the subsequent recruiting of pilots for the frontlines by Marina Raskova, Sebrova joined the military in October 1941. She then went on to attend flight training at Engels Military Aviation School of Pilots, where Raskova's recruits were trained. Although she and most other women that were assigned to the 588th Night Bomber Aviation Regiment formally completed training in February 1942, the unit was not deployed to the frontlines until May that year, but she almost did not live to see combat, having survived a crash along with her navigator Rufina Gasheva during a training flight on the night of 9 March 1942; that night, they lost spatial orientation in poor weather conditions and crashed near their airfield. Nevertheless Sebrova did not lose her self-confidence, and went on to gain a reputation for having calm composure during the most difficult situations in combat.

Upon arrival at the front, she initially flew as a pilot, often with Natalya Meklin as her navigator. Together, they flew about 250 sorties as a crew before Meklin became a pilot. Sebrova soon distinguished herself as a skilled pilot after a mission over Mozdok in which she was tasked with distracting enemy forces so that other aircrews could bomb targets in the area unimpeded; despite the poor weather and dangerous task, she carried out the mission successfully and made a safe landing after it was over.

In 1943, the regiment was honored with the Guards designation and renamed as the 46th Guards Night Bomber Aviation Regiment. After the Battle of the Caucasus she went on to prove herself again in the battle for Crimea, having made several dozen sorties to airdrop 51 bags of food, ammunition, and other supplies to Red Army troops making the Kerch-Eltigen landing in addition to regular sorties, sometimes making 7-8 sorties in a single night when needed.

By October 1944 she accumulated 825 combat sorties, dropping 92 tons of bombs, taking out three artillery batteries, four searchlights, a locomotive, eight vehicles, over two platoons worth of enemy infantrymen, among other targets, for which she was nominated for the title Hero of the Soviet Union. While the nomination was pending in winter 1944 she was granted a 10-day leave, during which she visited her father and sister, who broke the news to her that her mother died after a German soldier yanked her winter boots off her feet.

Not long after being awarded the title on 23 February 1945, she suffered a close call in what she later recalled as her most memorable flight; during that flight she flew with Nina Reutskaya as her navigator. They successfully bombed their target, a heavily guarded fortress in Grudziądz, but soon realized that their engine was hit by shrapnel, resulting in the oil pressure plummeting and internal temperature of the engine skyrocketing before eventually failing altogether. Several kilometers inside German-controlled territory at the time of the engine failure, she nevertheless managed to glide her stricken plane into Soviet-controlled territory for an emergency landing.

After landing safely, she and Reutskaya surveyed the damage to their plane before venturing out in search of friendly troops. While trekking through the forest they found the bodies of two dead German soldiers before eventually encountering a Soviet vehicle. They then spoke to the driver, who explained he could not give them a ride to their airfield because he had to finish an urgent task, but he did give them directions to a village where Soviet tank troops were staying. The two made their way to the village and spent the night in a resident's house; that day, the driver returned to bring them to their airfield, where they arrived in the evening to learn that the regiment thought they had been killed in action. Previously she had experienced several other close calls that resulted in her having to make emergency landings, but none were as dramatic as the one over Grudziądz.

After the capitulation of Berlin, Sebrova with navigator Meklin took a daytime "victory lap" flight to survey the remains of the city, circling low over the Reichstag where the victory banner was recently hung. Throughout the war she flew in the battles the Caucasus, Belorussia, Ukraine, Kuban, Crimea, Poland, and Germany, accumulating more sorties than any other woman pilot, having totaled 1,008 combat sorties by the end of the war.

== Later life ==
She remained a flight commander in her wartime unit until its disbandment in October 1945, achieving the rank of senior lieutenant. In December of that year, she became a senior aircraft technician at a Soviet military aircraft workshop in Poland. Having married fellow aviation technician Aleksandr Khomenko, she gave birth to their daughter Galina in 1947. In August of that year she was reassigned to a different base in Poland, but soon retired from the military in 1948, since her husband was being reassigned to the 89th Transport Aviation Regiment, based at an airfield near Moscow. The family moved to Moscow, where from 1961 to 1967 Sebrova worked at an experimental production workshop in the MAI. She died on 5 April 2000 and was buried in the Rakitin Cemetery.

== Awards ==
- Hero of the Soviet Union (23 February 1945)
- Order of Lenin (23 February 1945)
- Three Orders of the Red Banner (19 October 1942, 26 April 1944, and 15 June 1945)
- Order of the Patriotic War 1st and 2nd class: (11 March 1985 and 27 April 1943)
- Order of the Red Star (8 October 1943)
- campaign and jubilee medals

== See also ==
- List of female Heroes of the Soviet Union
