= CNN Millennium =

- Genre: Documentary
- Inspired by: Millennium: A History of Our Last Thousand Years by Felipe Fernández-Armesto
- Creative director: Bernard Heyes
- Narrated by: Ben Kingsley
- No. of seasons: 1
- No. of episodes: 10

Original release
- Network: CNN
- Release: October 10 – December 12, 1999

CNN Millennium or Millennium: A Thousand Years of History or MM Millenium or Millennium is a CNN Perspectives television series or miniseries about world history during the 2nd millennium from the 11th to the 20th centuries.

The Millennium series should not be confused with the CNN Millennium 2000 DVD, which documented the celebrations around the world for the arrival of the year 2000.

Sir Jeremy Isaacs, filmmaker of "The World at War" and CNN's Cold War, and Pat Mitchell, president of CNN Productions and Time Inc. Television, served as executive producers.

Ben Kingsley's role as narrator remained confined to introducing the subject matter and placing it into context. Main protagonists such as Genghis Khan tell their individual stories in their native tongues, relayed to viewers through simultaneous translation.

Bernard Heyes was in charge of graphic design and animation. Richard Blackford composed the original musical score for the series.

== Production ==
The production of the series lasted for over two years. Filming for the series took place in 28 countries.

== Broadcast and release ==
Millennium: A Thousand Years of History was first broadcast on BBC2 in the United Kingdom on Mondays between 18 October 1999 and 20 December 1999. CNN Millennium was first broadcast on CNN in the United States between 10 October 1999 and 12 December 1999, at 10pm on Sundays.

The series Biography of the Millennium was also about the history of the 2nd Millennium, and was first broadcast on A&E in the United States on 10 October 1999. The first broadcast of the first two hour episode of Biography of the Millennium ended at 10pm, just before the start of Millennium on CNN.

CNN Millennium was released on VHS cassettes. A CD of the Millennium soundtrack was available at the time of the broadcast.

CNN Interactive (now called CNN.com) created a dynamic companion website for the television series that includes animation, interactivity and 3-D effects. A companion book by Anthony Coleman was published by Bantam Press in 1999 under the title "Millennium".

== Awards and nominations ==
Bernard Heyes won a News & Documentary Emmy for the title sequence. Richard Blackford was nominated for an Emmy for the music.
