= List of ambassadors of Russia to Senegal =

Ambassador of the Russian Federation to the Republic of Senegal
- Ambassade de la Fédération de Russie en République du Sénégal et en République de Gambie
- Emblem of the Russian Foreign Ministry

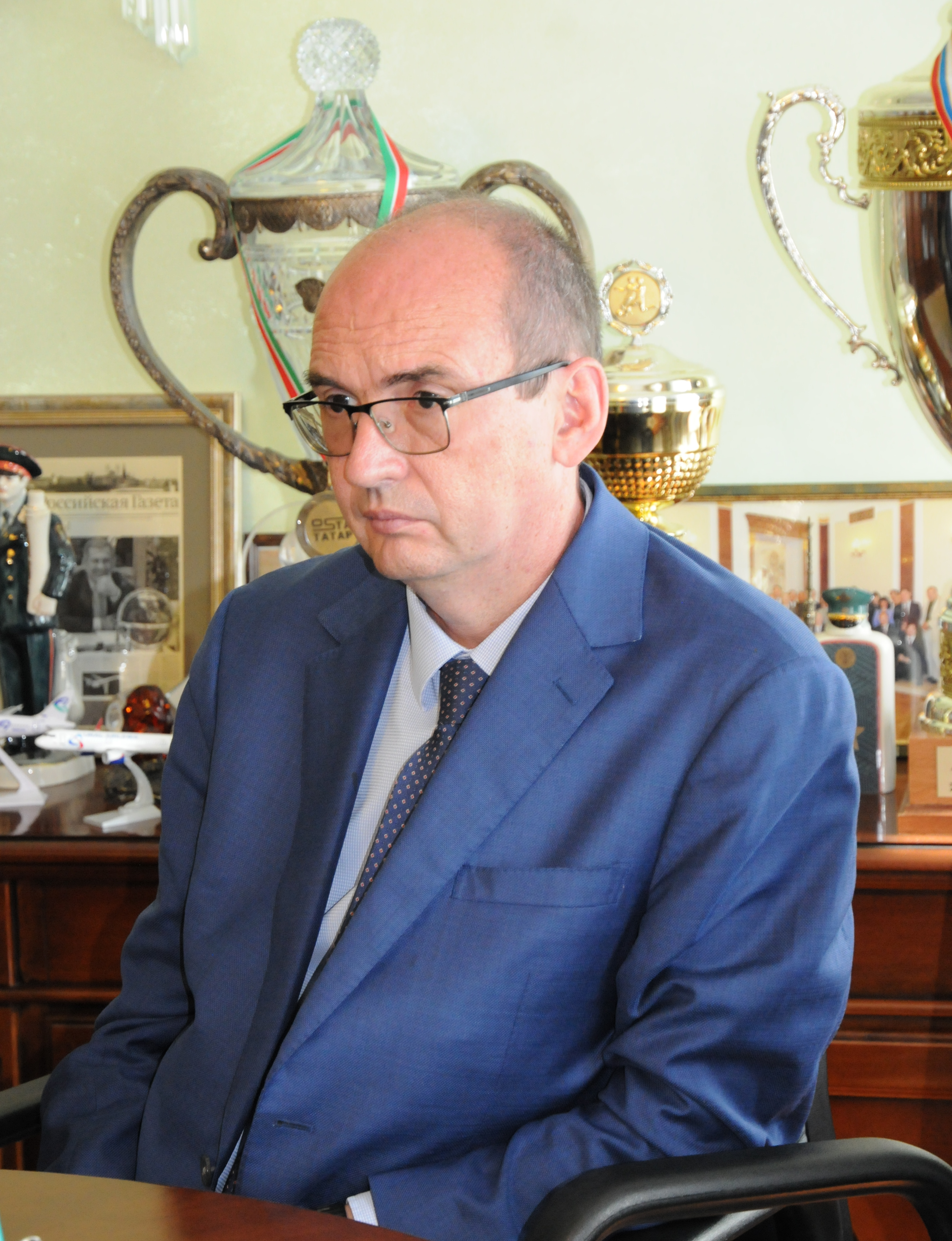
- Incumbent; Dmitry Kurakov since 17 August 2020
- Ministry of Foreign Affairs; Embassy of Russia in Dakar
- Style: His Excellency; The Honourable
- Reports to: Minister of Foreign Affairs
- Seat: Dakar
- Appointer: President of Russia
- Term length: At the pleasure of the president
- Website: Embassy of Russia in Senegal

The ambassador extraordinary and plenipotentiary of the Russian Federation to Senegal is the official representative of the president and the government of the Russian Federation to the president and the government of Senegal.

The ambassador and his staff work at large in the Embassy of Russia in Dakar. The post of Russian ambassador to Senegal is currently held by Dmitry Kurakov, incumbent since 17 August 2020. Since 1965, the ambassador has had dual accreditation as the non-resident ambassador to The Gambia.

== History of diplomatic relations ==
The Soviet Union established diplomatic relations with Senegal on 14 June 1962. The first ambassador, Vladimir Yerofeyev, was appointed on 14 January 1963. Relations with The Gambia were established shortly afterwards, on 17 July 1965. Rather than open a new embassy, Yerofeyev was given dual accreditation as the ambassador to The Gambia from 25 September 1965. Following the dissolution of the Soviet Union in 1991, both Senegal and The Gambia recognised the Russian Federation as its successor state, and the incumbent Soviet ambassador, Valery Lipnyakov, was reappointed as the Russian ambassador on 10 February 1992, and continued in post until 1997.

== List of representatives (1962–present) ==
=== Soviet Union to Senegal (Note: And concurrently to The Gambia from 25 September 1965.) (1962–1991) ===
Name	Title	Appointment	Termination	Notes
Vladimir Yerofeyev	Ambassador	14 January 1963	25 August 1966	Presented credentials on 4 February 1963
Anatoly Kulazhenkov	Ambassador	25 August 1966	13 April 1968	Presented credentials on 27 October 1966
Dmitry Nikiforov	Ambassador	13 April 1968	30 April 1973	Presented credentials on 17 May 1968
Georgy Ter-Gazaryants	Ambassador	30 April 1973	4 July 1981	Presented credentials on 9 May 1973
Yury Belsky	Ambassador	5 September 1981	3 September 1987	Presented credentials on 30 October 1981
Aleksandr Papkin	Ambassador	3 September 1987	17 August 1991	
Valery Lipnyakov	Ambassador	17 August 1991	25 December 1991	

=== Russian Federation to Senegal (1991–present) ===
Name	Title	Appointment	Termination	Notes
Valery Lipnyakov	Ambassador	10 February 1992	2 June 1997	
Valeryonas Baltrunas	Ambassador	2 June 1997	15 August 2001	
Aleksandr Romanov	Ambassador	15 August 2001	21 April 2006	
Aleksandr Shulgin	Ambassador	21 April 2006	16 September 2009	
Valery Nesterushkin	Ambassador	16 September 2009	6 August 2014	
Sergey Kryukov	Ambassador	6 August 2014	12 June 2019	
Vasily Livichuk	Chargé d'affaires	July 2019	August 2020	
Dmitry Kurakov	Ambassador	17 August 2020		Presented credentials on 22 December 2020
