= Richard Blackford =

English composer

Richard Blackford (born 13 January 1954 in London) is an English composer.

== Biography ==
Richard Blackford PhD studied composition with Humphrey Searle and John Lambert at the Royal College of Music and conducting with Norman Del Mar. He was awarded the Mendelssohn Scholarship and the Tagore Gold Medal. He spent a number of years as Hans Werner Henze's assistant in Italy on a Leverhulme scholarship, where he received his first commissions while immersed in the European avant-garde.

He returned to London in 1977 to turn his sights to the dramatic potential of music, combining teaching at LAMDA with commissions for theatre scores along with concert commissions. After becoming first Composer in Residence at Balliol College, Oxford, he was commissioned to write the opera Metamorphoses for the Centenary of the Royal College of Music. Further collaborations with Ted Hughes and Tony Harrison led to international film and theatre projects, including The Prince's Play and Fram at the Royal National Theatre. In all he has composed four operas, two musicals, much concert music and the scores to over two hundred films, being nominated for an Emmy Award in 2001 for Outstanding Achievement In Music.

The mid-1990s saw a renewed focus on lyrical and dramatic works for the concert hall, notably Mirror of Perfection and Voices of Exile, both subjects of television documentaries. 2011 saw the premiere of Not In Our Time, a 55-minute choral and orchestral work commissioned to mark the Centenary of the Bournemouth Symphony Chorus and for performance on the tenth anniversary of 9/11, conducted by Gavin Carr. It was subsequently performed in Chicago and Bremen to standing ovations.

In 2014, Blackford collaborated with wild soundscape recordist Bernie Krause to compose The Great Animal Orchestra Symphony. The work combines the traditional sounds of the orchestra with recordings of gibbons, humpback whales, Pacific tree frogs, mountain gorillas, beavers and the musician wren. The piece was premiered on the 12 July 2014 at the Cheltenham Festival with the BBC National Orchestra of Wales and Martyn Brabbins, then given at the Aberystwyth MusicFest and Birmingham Town Hall by the LSSO. Nimbus Records and Nimbus Music Publishing released the CD and score respectively.

In 2015 Richard was awarded Die Goldene Deutschland for services to music in Germany. 2017 saw the premiere of his concertante work for violin and orchestra 'Niobe', commissioned by the Czech Philharmonic and recorded with soloist Tamsin Waley-Cohen for Signum Classics. The Czech Philharmonic also recorded Kalon for string quartet and string orchestra, a Cheltenham Festival commission in association with BBC Radio 3 for the 2018 Cheltenham Festival with the BBC NOW conducted by Martyn Brabbins. 2018 also saw the premiere of his string quartet Seven Hokusai Miniatures, commissioned by the Aberystwyth MusicFest for the Solem Quartet. 'Pietà', his third commission from the Bournemouth Symphony Chorus, conducted by Gavin Carr, was premiered in 2019 and won the Ivor Novello Award in the Choral Category 2020.In 2023 he was awarded Best Creator Award for his cantata Babel by Making Music, the National Federation of Music Societies. In 2024 Blackford received an Ivor Novello Award nomination at The Ivors Classical Awards for Songs of Nadia Anjuman. In 2025 Alisa Weilerstein gave the premiere of his Cello Concerto ("The Recovery Of Paradise"), his third commission from the Czech Philharmonic, and performed by them under Tomas Netopil in the Rudolfinum, Prague. It was subsequently released on the Pentatone label. In 2025 his large-scale cantata The Black Lake was commissioned by the Three Choirs Festival and premiered in Hereford Cathedral under David Hill.

Blackford is President of the Bournemouth Symphony Chorus, a Trustee of The Bach Choir and a Trustee of Lyrita Nimbus Arts. He is published by Novello and Nimbus Publishing. In January 2019 he was awarded the Degree of Doctor Of Philosophy by the University of Bristol.

== Style ==
Blackford’s music is predominantly tonal, often coloured by modal inflections, and avoids the techniques of the post‑war avant‑garde. Reviews describe his large‑scale works as “fairly conventional (tonal) orchestral oratorio‑style” and note that they do not employ experimental or highly innovative idioms. Although Blackford’s early career included contact with European modernism, his mature works favour accessible harmonic language combined with chromatic expressivity and rich orchestral textures.

His vocal and orchestral writing is characterised by carefully crafted melody and counterpoint, with critics describing works such as Pietà as “intellectual and sophisticated, yet accessible”, “rooted in tonality and modality”, and marked by “rhythmic dynamism, breadth of expression and lush textures reminiscent of Janáček and Szymanowski”. These features place Blackford stylistically close to elements of late continental Romanticism, particularly in his use of colouristic orchestration and expressive vocal lines.

Blackford frequently employs polymetric and ostinato‑based rhythmic structures, drawing on his own theoretical studies of polymetric organisation. His research describes the use of “polymetric patterns and intervallic development” and “irregularly grouped patterns within a unified tempo that create the illusion of simultaneous contrasting tempi”. Such rhythmic devices appear prominently in his dramatic and text‑driven works.

In his choral and vocal compositions, Blackford often integrates historical idioms— including modal or archaic text declamation—within a modern harmonic framework. Critics note that his works employ “evocative compositional styles” and adopt a “broad historical perspective” without resorting to pastiche or stylistic imitation. This results in a musical language that incorporates historical references functionally, while maintaining a contemporary harmonic and structural approach.

=== Career highlights ===
- 1974 – Leverhulme Scholarship to study in Rome with Henze; wins Mendelssohn Scholarship and Tagore Gold Medal.
- 1990 – premiere of the musical King, with lyrics by Maya Angelou, at London's Piccadilly Theatre.
- 1990-5 – Director of Music at the Royal Ballet School where he wrote ballet Plea to Autumn performed at the Royal Opera House.
- 2000 – Emmy Award nomination for Outstanding Achievement In Music for Millennium (CNN).
- 2007 – Composer in Residence to Brno Philharmonic. Premiere of Violin Concerto.
- 2011 – Premiere of Not In Our Time, under auspices of Cheltenham Festival, with The Bournemouth Symphony Chorus, The Bournemouth Symphony Youth Chorus and The Bournemouth Symphony Orchestra, conducted by Gavin Carr.
- 2014 – World Premiere of The Great Animal Orchestra Symphony at Cheltenham Festival, wild soundscapes by Bernie Krause, BBC National Orchestra of Wales, Martyn Brabbins
- 2015 – Awarded Die Goldene Deutschland in Cuviliestheater, Munich, for services to music in Germany. Other prizewinners included Placido Domingo and Jonas Kaufmann.
- 2017 – World Premiere of "Niobe" a Czech Philharmonic commission, performed by Tamsin Waley-Cohen (solo violin) and Ben Gernon (conductor)
- 2018 - World Premiere of "Kalon", performed by BBC National Orchestra of Wales, Martyn Brabbins (conductor)
- 2020 - Pietà, conducted by Gavin Carr, wins Ivor Novello Award for the Choral Category

== Key works ==
- Sir Gawain and the Green Knight (1978; soloists, children's and adult choruses, orchestra)
- Mirror of Perfection (1996; soprano, baritone, chorus, orchestra)
- Not In Our Time (2011; tenor and baritone soloists, chorus, children's chorus and orchestra)
- Violin Concerto (2007, revised 2008)
- Clarinet Quintet (2009)
- Voices of Exile (2001, rev. 2004; soloists, children's and adult choruses, orchestra)
- House of Harmony (2005; German-Singapore movie soundtrack)
- The Shell Seekers (2006)
- The Great Animal Orchestra (2014; Symphony for Orchestra and Wild Soundscapes)
- "The Better Angels of Our Nature" (2013) concerto for oboe and string orchestra
- "Five Naidu Songs" (2015) for mezzo-soprano, clarinet and string quartet
- "Niobe" (2016) for solo violin and orchestra
- "Kalon" (2017) for string quartet and string orchestra
- "Pietà" (2019) for SATB chorus, children's chorus, mezzo-soprano and baritone soli, soprano saxophone and strings.
- "Cello Conceerto (The Recovery of Paradise)
- "The Black Lake" for SATB chorus, soprano soloist and chamber orchestra
- "Orbital" for brass band

== Selected recordings ==
- Mirror of Perfection – Nimbus Alliance NI 6205
- Voices of Exile – Nimbus Alliance NI 6264
- Not In Our Time - Nimbus Alliance NI 6161
- The Great Animal Orchestra Symphony - Nimbus Alliance NI 6274
- On Another's Sorrow – Signum Classics SIGCD059
- Voices of Exile – Nimbus Alliance
- The Better Angels Of Our Nature - Champs Hill Records (CHRCD 116)
- Niobe - Signum Classics (SIGCD 539)
- Seven Hokusai Miniatures, Five Naidu Songs, Dragon Songs - Nimbus Alliance (NI 6379)
- Pietà - Nimbus Alliance (NI6396)
- Babel -for soprano, tenor and baritone soli, SATB chorus, piano duet, organ and two percussion (Lyrita SRCD432)
- Songs of Nadia Anjuman - for soprano and string orchestra (NI6444)
- The Recovery of Paradise - for Cello and Orchestra - Pentatone (PTC 5187473, digital only)
