= Novomoskovsk, Russia =

City in Tula Oblast, Russia

Novomoskovsk Новомосковск
- City
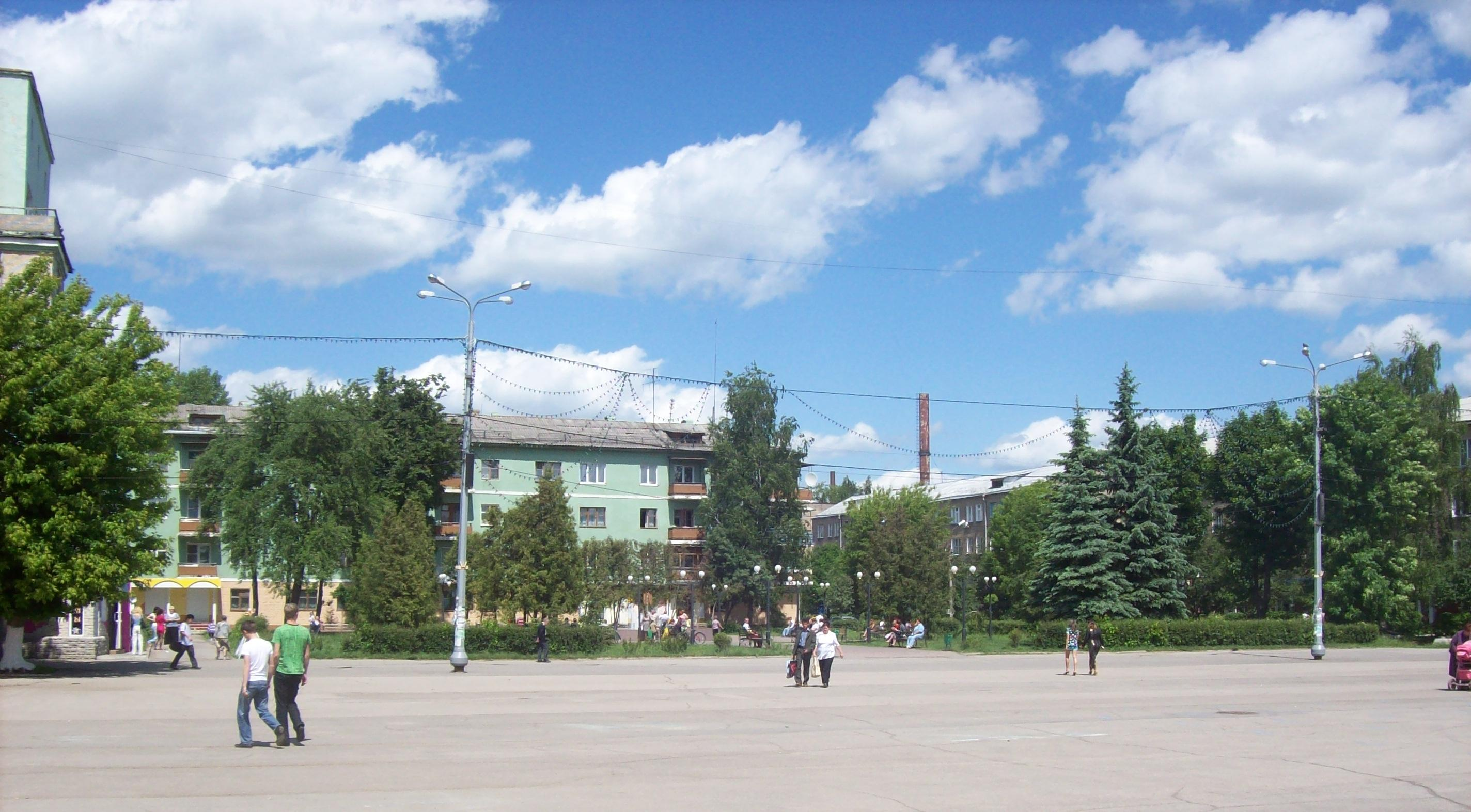
- Central square in Novomoskovsk

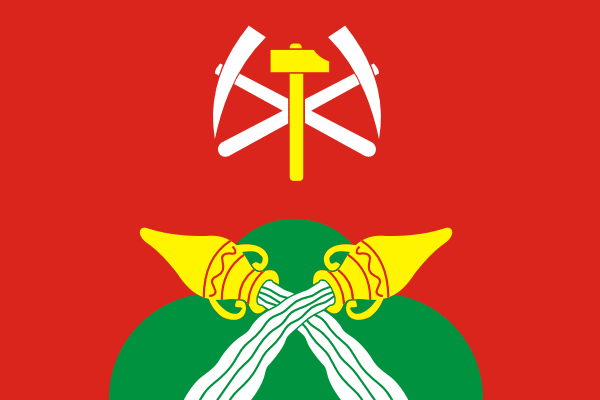
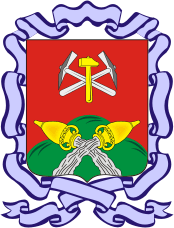
- Flag Coat of arms
- Interactive map of Novomoskovsk
- Location of Novomoskovsk Novomoskovsk (Tula Oblast)
- Coordinates: 54°05′N 38°13′E
- Country: Russia
- Federal subject: Tula Oblast
- Administrative district: Novomoskovsky District
- City under district jurisdictionSelsoviet: Novomoskovsk
- Founded: 1930
- City status since: 1930

Government
  - Body: Assembly of Deputies
  - Head: Anatoly Prorokov

Area
  - Total: 74.7 km^{2} (28.8 sq mi)
- Elevation: 220 m (720 ft)

Population (2010 Census)
  - Total: 131,386
  - Estimate (2025): 115,938 (−11.8%)
  - Rank: 124th in 2010
  - Density: 1,760/km^{2} (4,560/sq mi)

Administrative status
  - Capital of: Novomoskovsky District, Novomoskovsk Town Under District Jurisdiction

Municipal status
  - Urban okrug: Novomoskovsk Urban Okrug
  - Capital of: Novomoskovsk Urban Okrug
- Time zone: UTC+3 (MSK)
- Postal codes: 301650–301654, 301657, 301659–301666, 301668, 301670, 301679
- Dialing code: +7 48762
- OKTMO ID: 70724000001
- City Day: May 25
- Website: www.nmosk.ru

Novomoskovsk (Russian: Новомоско́вск; IPA: [nəvəmɐˈskofsk]) is a city and the administrative center of Novomoskovsky District in Tula Oblast, Russia, located at the source of the Don and Shat Rivers. Population: 131,386 (2010 census); 134,081 (2002 census); 146,302 (1989 Soviet census); 143,000 (1974); 107,000 (1959); 76,000 (1939).

== History ==
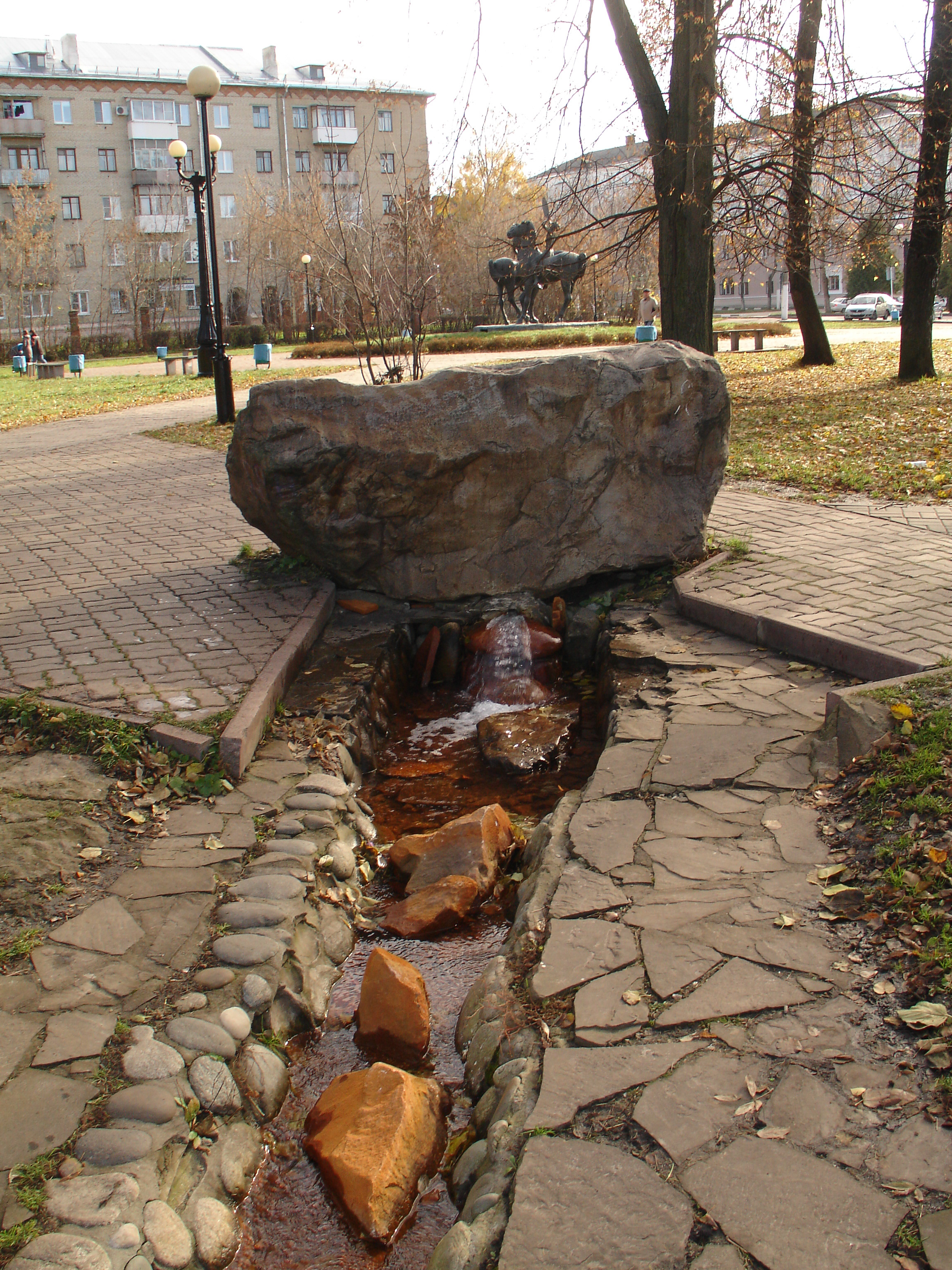
The source of the Don River in Novomoskovsk

The city originated in the 18th century as the family manor of Counts Bobrinsky, who industrialized it towards the end of the 19th century. The city, under the name of Bobriki (Бобрики) was officially established in 1930 and continued to develop as a coal (lignite) mining center throughout the Soviet period. In 1933, it was renamed Stalinogorsk (Сталиногорск). During World War II, the city was occupied by the German Army from November 22, 1941 to December 11, 1941. In 1961, it was given its present name. The city was awarded the Order of the Red Banner of Labor on January 14, 1971.

== Administrative and municipal status ==
Within the framework of administrative divisions, Novomoskovsk serves as the administrative center of Novomoskovsky District. As an administrative division, it is, together with three rural localities, incorporated within Novomoskovsky District as Novomoskovsk City Under District Jurisdiction. As a municipal division, the territories of Novomoskovsk Town Under District Jurisdiction and of thirteen rural okrugs of Novomoskovsky District are incorporated as Novomoskovsk Urban Okrug.

=== Local government ===
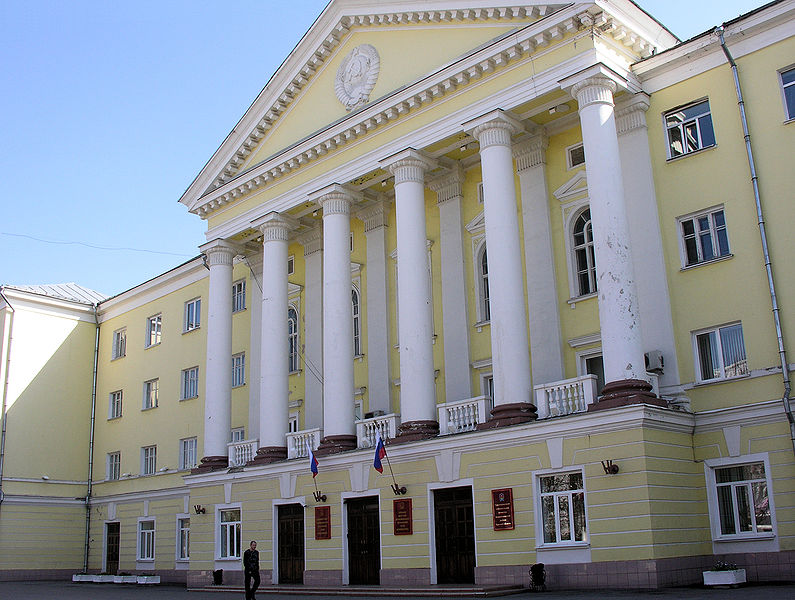
Administration building of Novomoskovsk

==== Heads of the city ====
#	Name	Party	Dates in office
1	Nikolai Minakov	United Russia	December 1997 — April 2009
2	Anatoly Tsoi	Communist Party of the Russian Federation	April 2009 — May 2009
3	Yelena Kozina	United Russia	May 2009 — 19 September 2013
4	Anatoly Prokorov	United Russia	20 September 2013 — 20 September 2023
5	Alexey Platonov	United Russia	20 September 2023 — present

==== Heads of the city administration ====
#	Name	Party	Dates in office
1	Stanislav Shchedenkov	—	1991 — 1996
2	Nikolai Minakov	United Russia	June 1996 — 13 November 2008
3	Igor Potapov	United Russia	13 November 2008 — April 2009
4	Вадим Zherzdev	United Russia	Acting since June 2009, 25 December 2009 — September 2018
5	Alexey Biryulin	United Russia	September 2018 — 19 September 2023
6	Ruslan Butov	United Russia	20 September 2023 — present

== Notable people ==
- Vladimir Fomichyov
- Aleksandr Lenyov
- Yury Mironov
- Dmitry Petrov (translator)
- Valery Rezantsev
- Ksenia Semyonova, gymnast
- Irina Sebrova, aviator
- Mikhail Slyadnev, former footballer
- Nikolai Tikhonov (cosmonaut)
- Aleksandr Vezdenetskiy, professional football coach and former player
- Vladimir Yulygin
- Aleksei Yurishchev

== Twin towns and sister cities ==
Novomoskovsk is twinned with:

- Kremenchuk, Ukraine
- Kuşadası, Turkey
- Prievidza, Slovakia
