= Veli Helenius =

Finnish diplomat and lawyer

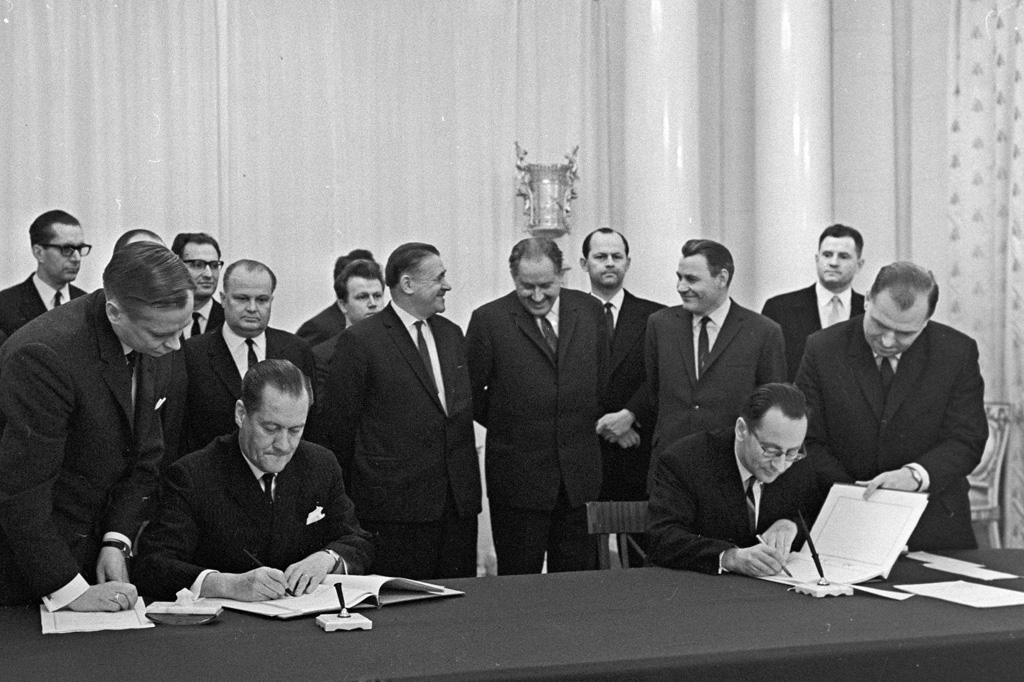
24 January 1966. Helenius (seated, left) signs a Soviet-Finnish consular convention. His counterpart, Soviet diplomat Oleg Khlestov, is seated right.

Veli Arthur Helenius (5 October 1910 – 16 November 1984) was a Finnish diplomat and lawyer.

Helenius was born and died in Helsinki. He was Chief Consul and Head of Commercial Representation in Cologne beginning in 1958, Ambassador to New Delhi, Jakarta and Bangkok from 1961 to 1964, Head of the Administrative Department of the Ministry for Foreign Affairs from 1964 to 1967, Ambassador to Beijing and Hanoi between 1967 and 1974 and Copenhagen from 1974 to 1977.

In 1964 he participated in the 2nd Summit of the Non-Aligned Movement in Cairo.
