= Cold War (TV series) =

1998 American TV documentary series

- 2012 re-release DVD cover
- Genre: Documentary
- Narrated by: Kenneth Branagh
- Composer: Carl Davis
- Country of origin: United States
- Original language: English
- No. of seasons: 1
- No. of episodes: 24

Production
- Producers: Pat Mitchell and Jeremy Isaacs
- Camera setup: Single-camera
- Running time: 46 minutes

Original release
- Network: CNN
- Release: September 27, 1998 – April 4, 1999

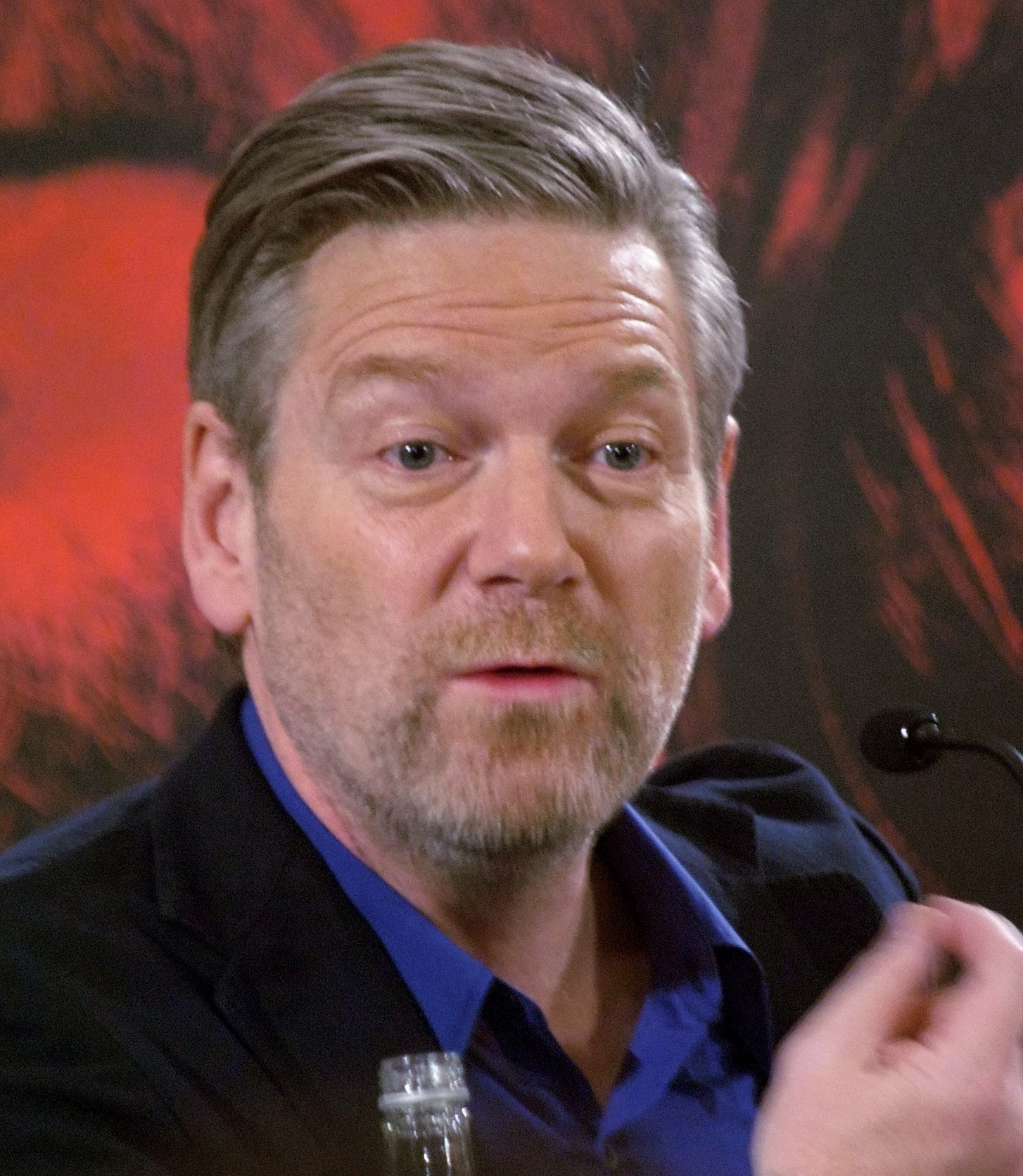
Narrator Kenneth Branagh

Cold War is a twenty-four episode television documentary series about the Cold War that first aired between September 27, 1998 and April 4, 1999. It features interviews and footage of the events that shaped the tense relationships between the Soviet Union and the United States.

The series was produced by Pat Mitchell and Jeremy Isaacs, who had earlier in 1973 produced the World War II documentary series The World at War in a similar style. Ted Turner funded the series as a joint production between the Turner Broadcasting System and the BBC. It was first broadcast on CNN in the United States between September 27, 1998, and April 4, 1999, and BBC Two in the United Kingdom. Writers included Hella Pick, Jeremy Isaacs, Lawrence Freedman, Neal Ascherson, Hugh O'Shaughnessy and Germaine Greer. Kenneth Branagh was the narrator, and Carl Davis (who also collaborated with Isaacs with The World at War) composed the theme music. Each episode would feature historical footage and interviews from both significant figures and others who had witnessed particular events.

After the series was broadcast it was released as a set of twelve (NTSC) or eight (PAL) VHS cassettes.

The series was released on DVD by Warner Home Video on May 8, 2012, in North America. The archival footage has been cropped for widescreen presentation instead of being left in the original format

== Episodes ==
Each episode lasts approximately 46 minutes.

| No. | Title | Timeline |
|---|---|---|
| 1 | "Comrades" | 1917–1945 |
Both the United States and the nascent Soviet Union drifted apart after the Bolshevik Revolution, the Russian Civil War and the Paris Peace Conference. Diplomatic and extensive trading relationships were established under Roosevelt, but relations soured following the Soviet occupation of the Baltic States and eastern Poland. After Hitler broke the Molotov–Ribbentrop Pact the Western powers worked closely with the Soviet Union during the Second World War. Distrust reemerged as Stalin's plans for placing Eastern Europe in the Soviet Union's sphere of influence became apparent towards the war's end, and came to the fore at the Potsdam Conference, just before the atomic bombings of Hiroshima and Nagasaki. Interviewees include George F. Kennan, Vladimir Yerofeyev, Zoya Zarubina, Hugh Lunghi and George Elsey. The pre-credits scene shows footage of a nuclear test, a girl wandering in the ruins of Hiroshima, and the US Congress nuclear bunker at The Greenbrier, introducing the television series by explaining how for several decades the world was close to a nuclear holocaust.
| 2 | "Iron Curtain" | 1945–1947 |
The wartime allies demobilise – the United States enjoys its economic strength and resurgence while Britain and the rest of Europe is exhausted. A new series of purges takes place in the Soviet Union, and is ravaged by famine. Germans are expelled from territories now given to Poland by the Soviet Union, and differences emerge over Germany's post-war rehabilitation. Stalin increases his grasp on Eastern Europe, although does not intervene on the side of the Communists in the Greek Civil War. Britain's power influence goes into decline, weakened from the war and a severe winter. Food shortages threaten stability throughout Europe. The United States begins to adopt a more assertive foreign policy, countering Soviet influence in Turkey and Iran. Interviewees include Lord Annan, Sir Frank Roberts and Paul Nitze. The pre-credits scene features Winston Churchill's 1946 "Iron Curtain" speech in Fulton in the United States, which set the tone for confrontation.
| 3 | "Marshall Plan" | 1947–1952 |
For both altruistic and self-serving purposes, the United States provides massive grants of aid to the countries of Europe in the form of the Marshall Plan. Stalin, concerned that the intent of the Marshall Plan is to weaken Soviet influence in Europe, prevents countries in its orbit from participating, and establishes the rival Council for Mutual Economic Assistance. Communists come to power through a coup in Czechoslovakia in 1948. Tito, while originally aligned to the Soviet Union, adopts a more independent foreign policy and eventually switches to receiving Marshall Aid Assistance. The CIA and the Catholic Church conspire to help oust the Italian Communist Party and its coalition allies in the 1948 Italian election. The Marshall Plan has the effect of modernising European economies and societies, bringing Western Europe closer together, and closer to the United States. Interviewees include Vladimir Yerofeyev, Gianni Agnelli and Giulio Andreotti. The pre-credits scene portrays the squalor in post-war Italy, and Truman delivering his Truman Doctrine speech of 1947.
| 4. | "Berlin" | 1948–1949 |
By 1947, the United States placed as a high priority the revival of the German economy, an approach opposed by the Soviet Union. After the introduction of a Deutsche Mark the Soviet Union began to allow increasingly stringent checks on passenger and cargo flows travelling to the French, British and American sectors of Berlin, located in the heart of East Germany. This ultimately led to a blockade on all rail and road transport linking West Berlin, but an extensive airlift operation (Operation Vittles) allowed the city to survive. The Communists were however successful in staging a putsch in the Berlin municipal government, eventually leading to the divisions of both Berlin and Germany. Interviewees include Gail Halvorsen, Sir Freddie Laker and Clark Clifford. The pre-credits scene shows the Berlin Airlift in operation.
| 5. | "Korea" | 1949–1953 |
Korea after the Second World War was occupied by both the Soviets and the Americans, who respectively installed Kim Il-sung and Syngman Rhee as leaders. With Soviet support, North Korea invaded the South in 1950, pushing the unprepared South Korean and US forces back to Pusan. The world responds, both to combat communism and demonstrate support to the United Nations. After landing at Inchon and liberating Seoul, United Nations forces advance into North Korea. This unsettles Mao Zedong, who on Stalin's request sends Chinese forces into North Korea to support them and pushes the UN back. Eventually both sides are more or less at stalemate in the centre of Korea. After countless talks, eventually an armistice is signed. Communism was contained, but Korea would remain divided. Interviewees include Lucius D. Battle, Paik Sun-yup and John Glenn. The pre-credits scene shows a battle in progress – the first "hot war" of the Cold War.
| 6. | "Reds" | 1948–1953 |
The fears the leadership of both sides had were projected inwards towards their own people. In the United States the House Committee on Un-American Activities and the Tydings Committee carried out investigations into alleged Communist sympathisers in US public life, in particular the State Department and Hollywood. In the Soviet Union a personality cult emerged around Stalin, and a repressive police environment and comprehensive surveillance kept the population fearful. In response to Yugoslavia's maverick foreign policy, Stalin inspired the Prague Trials to warn Eastern European leaders not to stray away from emulating the Soviet model. Repression in the Soviet Union peaked with the investigations into the so-called Doctors' Plot, just before Stalin's sudden death in 1953. Interviewees include Arthur Kinoy, Ralph de Toledano and Boris Pokrovsky. The pre-credits scene shows both a Soviet labour camp and its victims and footage of J. Edgar Hoover explaining the dangers Communism posed to American values.
| 7. | "After Stalin" | 1953–1956 |
Nikita Khrushchev becomes Soviet leader after the death of Stalin. Khrushchev rolls back a number of oppressive measures that existed under Stalin, restores relations with Yugoslavia and redirects resources to consumer needs. In a secret speech to the Soviet leadership he condemns Stalin's ruthless rule. West Germany is allowed to rearm, provoking the formation of the Warsaw Pact. Khrushchev still wants Eastern Europe to remain within the Soviet orbit – he sends in troops to quell revolts in East Germany, Poland and, most significantly, Hungary. Interviewees include Anatoly Dobrynin, Charles Wheeler and Sergei Khrushchev. The pre-credits scene shows life in Soviet Union under Stalin's personality cult.
| 8. | "Sputnik" | 1949–1961 |
As a consequence of the atomic spies, the Soviet Union joined the nuclear club, and the two superpowers compete to develop their nuclear arsenals. The Soviet Union's launching of Sputnik further heightened a sense of vulnerability in the United States, and results in the rapid development of nuclear-armed missiles, and defence-related education. Blamed for a perceived missile gap, Eisenhower is replaced by John F. Kennedy as US President. The Soviet Union is seen to have taken a solid lead in the space race after Yuri Gagarin's successful return to Earth. Interviewees include Joseph Rotblat, Boris Chertok, Andrew Goodpaster, Herbert York and Gherman Titov. The pre-credits scene features the first Soviet nuclear test in 1949.
| 9. | "The Wall" | 1958–1963 |
West Germany, and West Berlin, become more affluent, prompting a surge of East Germans to cross the borders in Berlin, kept open under the Four Power Agreement on Berlin. Khrushchev's demands that the Americans, British and French leave Berlin are opposed, and prospects for a peaceful resolution are dashed after the Soviets pull out of the Paris Summit in 1960 as a response to the U-2 incident. Overnight on August 12, 1961 East German police and military units divided the city of Berlin, and work commenced on building the Berlin Wall. Initial tensions culmulate in a stand-off between US and Soviet tanks. Kennedy visits Berlin in June 1963 and delivers his Ich bin ein Berliner speech. Interviewees include Anatoly Gribkov, Valentin Falin, Stefan Heym, Egon Bahr, Raymond L. Garthoff and Conrad Schumann. The pre-credits scene features East Berliners seeking to flee into the West.
| 10. | "Cuba" | 1959–1962 |
Fidel Castro comes to power following the Cuban Revolution. Cuba aligns itself with the Soviet Union and the government starts nationalising American interests, resulting in the United States imposing an economic boycott, and the failed Bay of Pigs Invasion. Following the detection of Soviet medium range missiles stationed in Cuba, the United States imposes a blockade on the island, and the Soviet Union mobilises for war. The Cuban Missile Crisis is eventually resolved through secret negotiations, in which the USSR and the United States agree to withdraw missiles from Cuba and Turkey respectively. Interviewees include Fidel Castro, Walter Cronkite, Pierre Salinger and Theodore Sorensen. The pre-credits scene has interviews of Fidel Castro, Robert McNamara and Anatoly Dobrynin explaining how close they felt the world was to a nuclear holocaust.
| 11. | "Vietnam" | 1954–1968 |
After losing the Battle of Dien Bien Phu the French leave Vietnam. A stream of refugees flee to the south after the Communist north institute a harsh land reform program. The north, with Soviet military assistance, seeks to reunify the country by using the Viet Cong to destabilise the South, prompting American intervention which escalates after the Gulf of Tonkin incident. American casualties mount in an increasingly unpopular and seemingly purposeless war that was difficult to wage successfully. President Lyndon B. Johnson's stature is reduced following the Tet Offensive. The bombing of North Vietnam is interspersed with peace negotiations, which prove fruitless. Interviewees include Robert McNamara, William Westmoreland, Nguyen Vo Giap, Bui Diem, Jack Valenti and Clark Clifford. The pre-credits scene portrays the destruction caused by the Vietnam War.
| 12. | "MAD" | 1960–1972 |
The United States nuclear strategy of counterforce, intended to counter a Soviet conventional attack by targeting military facilities, is discredited following the Cuban Missile Crisis. Instead Defence Secretary McNamara adopts the doctrine of Mutually Assured Destruction (MAD), with the belief that the targeting by the superpowers of each other's cities would deter a nuclear war. Both sides step up nuclear testing and acquire more nuclear weapons, in particular submarines capable of unleashing retaliation should the opponent strike first. The Soviets choose to follow a more defensive doctrine and introduce anti-ballistic missiles, which the United States seek to counter with multiple independently targetable reentry vehicles. The arms race remains expensive, controversial and, as demonstrated in the Palomares incident, not without risk. However some small promise of arms control comes from the SALT Treaty. Interviewees include Russell E. Dougherty, William Kaufmann and Harold Brown. The pre-credits scene has McNamara explaining how MAD was the foundation for deterrence.
| 13. | "Make Love Not War" | 1960s |
The United States entered the 1960s with strength and self-confidence. Kennedy increased arms production, bringing an economic boom to California. Rising expectations led to the civil rights movement growing stronger, despite the rough response from authorities which regarded them as Communist inspired. More of America's youth became increasingly hostile to the Vietnam War, and embraced new counterculture and permissive definitions of the American ideals of freedom. Fractures in America's society became increasingly violent, and the latter half of the 1960s brought race riots, the assassination of Martin Luther King Jr. and of Robert F. Kennedy and the Chicago Convention protests. With the political left appearing divided and radicalised, Richard Nixon is voted into office. Interviewees include Irwin Allen Ginsberg, Rennie Davis, Bobby Seale, Dick Gregory, Hugh Hefner, and Eugene McCarthy. The pre-credits scene shows The Beatles touring the United States.
| 14. | "Red Spring" | 1960s |
Likewise the Soviet Union started the decade with growing openness and optimism. There was also an emerging cohort of youth with no memory of the privations and purges of the past, and who had a taste for Western music and fashion that alarmed the established order. Khrushchev sought, with limited success, to make the Soviet consumer economy more affluent, and he initiated housing construction and the poorly organised Virgin Lands Campaign. Khrushchev's erratic leadership style, his handling of the Cuban Missile Crisis and a poor 1963 harvest eventually led to his removal from power. Czechoslovakia had an even more profound transformation under Alexander Dubček, who introduced human rights and free market reforms. However the Prague Spring was opposed by Soviet general secretary Leonid Brezhnev, and was ended abruptly in 1968. Interviewees include Miloš Forman, Vladimir Semichastny, Vasil Biľak and Yevgeny Yevtushenko. The pre-credits scene show Khrushchev and Czechoslovak leader Antonín Novotný demonstrating solidarity in 1964, in contrast to the Soviet Union ruling by brute force four years later.
| 15. | "China" | 1949–1972 |
Following the Chinese Revolution Mao Zedong aligns China firmly with the Soviet Union. China becomes the recipient of Soviet aid, supports Communist movements worldwide and confronts the United States in Korea and in the Taiwan straits. Domestically China experienced upheaval and disaster with the post-revolution land reforms, the Great Leap Forward and the Cultural Revolution. A range of factors, including Khrushchev's apparent acceptance of co-existence with the capitalist West and his refusal to share Soviet nuclear technology with China, led to the Sino-Soviet split and eventual conflict. Both sides become deeply distrustful of the other, particularly after China develops nuclear weapons. Sensing an opportunity to contain the Soviet Union, in 1972 the United States suddenly and unexpectedly moves to reestablish ties with China. Interviewees include Wu Ningkun, Marshall Green, Liu Binyan, Stepan Chervonenko and Henry Kissinger. The pre-credits scene shows Nixon's visit to China, only six years after the Cultural Revolution.
| 16. | "Détente" | 1969–1975 |
Nixon builds closer relations with China and the USSR, hoping to leverage an honourable US exit from Indochina. The Soviet Union is fearful of a US-Chinese alliance, but summits between Nixon and Brezhnev lead to a relaxation of tensions and concrete arms control agreements. Willy Brandt's Ostpolitik strategy also normalises West German relations with East Germany, the USSR and Poland. Although deeply unpopular domestically, US bombing of Cambodia and Hanoi succeeds in bringing North Vietnam to the negotiating table, leading to the Paris Peace Accords in 1972. Deeply resented by South Vietnam, the Accords ultimately fail to prevent Saigon's fall three years later. In 1975 reapproachment continued with the Helsinki Accords, which enshrined human rights and territorial integrity, and the symbolic Apollo–Soyuz Test Project. Interviewees include Melvin Laird, Valeri Kubasov, Winston Lord, John Ehrlichman and Gerald Ford. The pre-credits scene shows a Soviet cartoon demonstrating the futility of the arms race.
| 17. | "Good Guys, Bad Guys" | 1967–1978 |
Under détente the superpowers continued their rivalry, but carefully avoided direct conflict by courting allies in the developing world. Israel moved closer to the United States after the Six-Day War, while Egypt erratically maintained its ties with the USSR. During the subsequent Yom Kippur War the United States reluctantly supplied aid to Israel, but when it became apparent the Egyptian Army was on the verge of destruction the Soviet Union threatened to intervene. The United States held its ground, brought the two warring sides to the negotiating table, and demonstrated it was the preeminent power in the Middle East. In Angola the Cuban-backed People's Movement for the Liberation of Angola (MPLA) manages to retain power, staving off attacks from the Central Intelligence Agency-backed National Liberation Front of Angola (FNLA), the South African-backed National Union for the Total Independence of Angola (UNITA) and foreign mercenaries. Cuba also intervenes in the Ogaden War, defending Marxist Ethiopia from Somalia. Interviewees include Saad El Shazly, Abba Eban, Simcha Dinitz, Holden Roberto, Pik Botha and Jimmy Carter. The pre-credits scene shows a group of Africans watching a film possibly about Communism, with the narrator noting American fears of Soviet expansionism in the post-colonial world.
| 18. | "Backyard" | 1954–1990 |
The United States saw the emergence of leftist movements in different Latin American countries as threatening to its commercial interests, and secretly plotted with military strongmen and middle class interests concerned with the land reforms and nationalisation policies of new governments. In Guatemala, Jacobo Árbenz was ousted by a CIA-inspired coup in 1954. Similarly US meddling in Chile's economic and political spheres weakened Salvador Allende grip on power, and he was ultimately deposed by his own military in 1973. The U.S. sent troops to the Dominican Republic in 1965 and Grenada in 1983, and trained and supported various acquiescent juntas, including a brutal regime in El Salvador during its civil war. In Nicaragua, the U.S. secretly supported the Contras against the leftist Sandinista government; eventually military actions and economic sanctions push Nicaraguans into voting for anti-Sandinista politician Violeta Chamorro in 1990. Interviewees include Frank Wisner, Hortensia Bussi, Nikolai Leonov, Violeta Chamorro and Daniel Ortega. The pre-credits scene explains that although the USSR avoided intervening in the region, following the Cuban Revolution Castro and Che Guevara sought to spark "100 Vietnams" across Latin America by initiating guerrilla movements.
| 19. | "Freeze" | 1977–1981 |
Carter's ambitious proposals for total multilateral nuclear disarmament are rejected by Brezhnev; his championing of human rights does not win favour either. The Helsinki Accords encourage writers to establish Charter 77 in Czechoslovakia. The visit of Pope John Paul II revitalises Polish nationalism, while in the Soviet Union high profile dissidents and refuseniks gains popular attention. The Soviets continue a conventional arms race, draining resources from a demoralised consumer economy. SALT II is signed, to the consternation of many Europeans because of the Treaty's "double track" provisions concerning the deployment of new SS-20 and Pershing II missiles. Carter's failure to exercise American resolve and strength over the Soviet invasion of Afghanistan, the Iran hostage crisis and an oil shock ultimately costs him the 1980 elections, and the United States decisively swings to a more confrontational foreign policy under Ronald Reagan. Brezhnev successfully leans on Polish leader Wojciech Jaruzelski to crack down on the Solidarity movement. Interviewees include Jeane Kirkpatrick, Lech Wałęsa, Václav Havel and Helmut Schmidt. The pre-credits scene shows the United States basking in confidence during its bicentennial, with the narrator noting détente would shortly be over.
| 20. | "Soldiers of God" | 1975–1988 |
Nur Mohammad Taraki comes to power in Afghanistan and attempts to modernise the country on Marxist-Leninist lines, provoking a rebellion from more traditional power brokers in the country. The Soviets are initially reluctant to intervene militarily, but respond after Taraki is violently replaced by Hafizullah Amin who is considered to be destabilising influence. The Soviets invade Afghanistan, and soon find themselves unprepared facing a hostile army of mujahideen insurgents, secretly armed by the Americans who see the war as an opportunity to wear down the Soviet Union. To achieve mobility in Afghanistan's rugged terrain the Soviet Union uses helicopters, but are thwarted by Stinger missiles. Atrocities are committed by Soviet and mujahideen forces. Eventually Soviet forces would leave Afghanistan under the terms of the Geneva Accords, but bloodshed would continue with rival mujahideen forces fighting each other. Interviewees include Caspar Weinberger, Artyom Borovik and Zbigniew Brzezinski. The pre-credits scene shows a battle in progress and presents the views of the superpowers – the Soviet Union did not want to lose face by being defeated in a proxy war.
| 21. | "Spies" | 1944–1994 |
Throughout the Cold War both sides sought intelligence about their opponents using spies, satellites and other means. For political reasons, scientists working on the Manhattan Project provided nuclear secrets to the Soviets. British agents George Blake and Kim Philby passed on to the Soviet Union the identities of Western intelligence assets, and the presence of the Berlin Tunnel. Conversely, Soviet Colonel Oleg Penkovsky gave the West vital details of Soviet nuclear vulnerabilities. Intelligence services are also used to silence dissent, in particular in East Germany. After the Cold War an investigation revealed the Soviet Union had been aware of a number of double agents operating in its midst from information provided by a CIA mole, Aldrich Ames. One such agent, Oleg Gordievsky, managed to flee the Soviet Union, but Adolf Tolkachev and Dmitri Polyakov were arrested, tried and executed. Interviewees include Markus Wolf, Ted Hall, Oleg Kalugin, George Blake, Yuri Modin and Aldrich Ames (who was serving a life sentence). The pre-credits scene shows Polyakov being arrested by the KGB.
| 22. | "Star Wars" | 1981–1988 |
Reagan's 1983 "Evil Empire" speech sets the tone for a more aggressive US posture against the Soviet Union, and the costly arms race is renewed. He hopes that space-based anti-missile systems known as Strategic Defense Initiative (SDI) could render nuclear weapons obsolete, but the Soviet Union is concerned of upsetting the MAD paradigm that had kept the world safe. Gorbachev assumes power in the Soviet Union, setting to reform the Soviet economy and encourage greater openness. He bonds well with both Reagan and Margaret Thatcher, charismatic to Soviet sensibilities, but the SDI issue prevents arms control agreements being made in Geneva Summit or Reykjavík. The weakness of the Soviet system is revealed by the Chernobyl disaster and Mathias Rust's Red Square stunt. Knowing the Soviet Union could not compete with SDI without the economic welfare of its people being severely curtailed, whose exposure to popular culture and foreign media has led to raised expectations, Gorbachev eventually agrees to a landmark agreement, the Intermediate-Range Nuclear Forces Treaty. Disarmament commences, under the maxim of doveryai, no proveryai. Interviewees include Donald Regan, Sir Charles Powell, Roald Sagdeev and Mikhail Gorbachev. The pre-credits scene shows an advertisement for Reagan's 1984 election campaign.
| 23. | "The Wall Comes Down" | 1989 |
Gorbachev makes clear Eastern European countries were free to determine their own destinies. In Poland Solidarity enters into negotiations with the Government, and would end up winning a landslide election. In Hungary the Government chooses to symbolically reinter Imre Nagy, and open its frontier with Austria, which is then crossed by increasing numbers of holidaying East Germans. Erich Honecker refuses to implement reforms, despite subtle pressure from Gorbachev and growing protests across East Germany. The bloody end to dissent in China is never far from the minds of protesters. Just as protests reach a peak, Soviet forces in East Germany are stood down, and Honecker is replaced by an unimpressive Egon Krenz. As a concession travel restrictions are lifted but the new regulations are miscommunicated, and the Berlin Wall is suddenly and irrevocably breached by masses of East Germans. In the momentum, the fate of communism in East Germany is sealed. Interviewees include Mikhail Gorbachev, Miklós Németh, Egon Krenz and George H. W. Bush. The pre-credits scene includes Gorbachev explaining that by 1989, force alone could not secure the world.
| 24. | "Conclusions" | 1989–1991 |
Gorbachev and Bush meet at Malta in December 1989 to consider the recent dramatic events. Only the previous week the Communist government resigned in Czechoslovakia; and shortly Nicolae Ceaușescu would be deposed and executed in the bloody Romanian Revolution. Gorbachev permits German reunification and removes Soviet troops from Europe, but fails to secure financial support from the West. As the Soviet economy collapses, Gorbachev faces opposition from both reformers and hardliners. Sharing their abhorence of Soviet disintegration, Gorbachev brings in hardliners to his government and cracks down on the Lithuanian independence movement. However they later turn on Gorbachev and stage a coup. Boris Yeltsin is instrumental in rallying the public and military to defeat the coup. Sidelining Gorbachev, Yeltsin sets the course for Russia to leave the Soviet Union by establishing the Commonwealth of Independent States. The Soviet Union ends on 26 December 1991, and in his Christmas Day address Bush announces the Cold War is over. The cost of the Cold War is considered in retrospect. Interviewees include Mircea Dinescu, Alexander Rutskoy and Condoleezza Rice. The pre-credits scene features Bush and Gorbachev explaining how uncertain the world had suddenly become.

== VHS vs DVD editions ==
The VHS version is formatted with 4:3 aspect ratio, common for CRT television sets. The interviews are cropped on the sides to fit television screen.

The DVD version is formatted with 16:9 aspect ratio, suitable for widescreen television sets. The archival film is cropped on top and bottom to achieve wider aspect ratio.

Archival film example, VHS (left) vs. DVD (right)

Interview example, VHS (left) vs. DVD (right)
