= Aleksei Yurishchev =

Russian footballer

Personal information
- Full name: Aleksei Sergeyevich Yurishchev
- Date of birth: 20 October 1978 (age 48)
- Place of birth: Novomoskovsk, Soviet Union
- Height: 1.85 m (6 ft 1 in)
- Position: Defender

Senior career*
| Years | Team | Apps | (Gls) |
| 1996–1997 | FC Luch Tula | 27 | (0) |
| 1997 | FC Kirovets Tula | 13 | (3) |
| 1998–1999 | FC Arsenal-2 Tula | 69 | (4) |
| 2000 | FC Arsenal Tula | 31 | (1) |
| 2001 | FC Torpedo Moscow | 1 | (0) |
| 2001 | → FC Torpedo-d Moscow (farm team) | 16 | (0) |
| 2002 | → FC Arsenal Tula (loan) | 26 | (2) |
| 2003 | → FC Ural Yekaterinburg (loan) | 9 | (0) |
| 2004 | → FC Don Novomoskovsk (loan) | 7 | (0) |
| 2005–2006 | Avangard Donskoy | 41 | (19) |
| 2007 | FC Don Novomoskovsk | 7 | (2) |
| 2007 | FC Lobnya-Alla Lobnya | 11 | (1) |
| 2008–2009 | FC Zvezda Serpukhov | 55 | (0) |
| 2010 | FC Kaluga | 14 | (0) |
| 2010 | → FC Kaluga-2 (farm team) | 1 | (0) |
| 2011 | FC Khimik Novomoskovsk | | |
| 2012 | SKA Kamenetski | | |
- * Club domestic league appearances and goals

Aleksei Sergeyevich Yurishchev (Russian: Алексей Сергеевич Юрищев; born 20 October 1978) is a former Russian professional footballer.

== Club career ==
He made his debut in the Russian Premier League in 2001 for FC Torpedo Moscow.
