= Dmitry Petrov =

Dmitry Petrov may refer to:

- Dmitry Petrov (anarchist) (1989–2023), a Russian anarchist activist
- Dmitry Petrov (sprinter) (born 1982), a Russian sprinter
- Dmitry Petrov (translator) (born 1958), a Russian translator and TV presenter
