= Oleg Khlestov =

Soviet diplomat (1923–2021)

- Олег Николаевич Хлестов
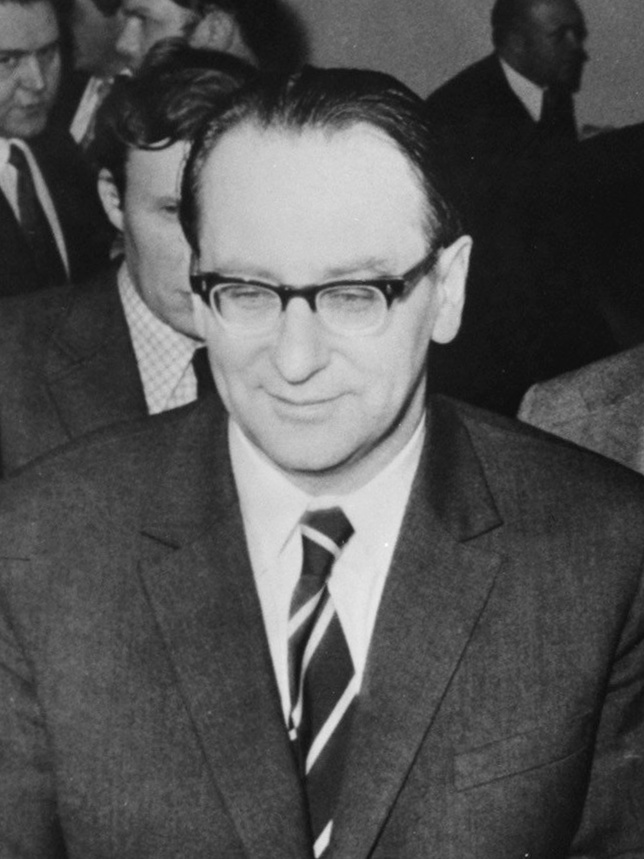
- Khlestov in 1973

Permanent Representative of the USSR to International Organizations in Vienna
- In office 1979–1988
- Preceded by: Vladimir Yerofeyev
- Succeeded by: Roland Timerbayev

Personal details
- Born: 6 June 1923 Moscow, Russian SFSR, Soviet Union
- Died: 31 August 2021 (aged 98)
- Education: Higher Diplomatic School of the Ministry of Foreign Affairs
- Awards: Twice Order of the Red Banner of Labour; Order of Friendship of Peoples

Oleg Nikolayevich Khlestov (Russian: Олег Николаевич Хлестов; 6 June 1923 – 31 August 2021) was a Soviet diplomat and academic. He served in various diplomatic roles from 1945 onwards, and was Permanent Representative of the USSR to International Organizations in Vienna between 1979 and 1988.

Entering the diplomatic service after 1945, Khlestov spent the early stage of his career with the Soviet Union's diplomatic mission in Bulgaria, before returning to the central offices of the Ministry of Foreign Affairs and becoming a leading expert on international law and affairs. By the 1960s he was taking part in international conferences and negotiations, helping to draft bilateral treaties, and by the 1970s he led delegations to discuss matters of military deployments and disarmament, and the application of space and maritime law in international settings. Retiring shortly before the dissolution of the Soviet Union, he continued to participate in scientific and teaching activities.

Khlestov became an influential academic, teaching at the Moscow State Institute of International Relations, the Diplomatic Academy of the Ministry of Foreign Affairs of the Russian Federation and Moscow State Linguistic University. He wrote over 170 publications on international law and relations, and was vice-president of the Russian Association for the Assistance of the United Nations, and the Russian Association of International Law. He also assisted in the preparation of Russian laws as a representative of the President of the Russian Federation in the Federation Council, and a member of the Expert Council on International Law under the Chairman of the State Duma. He was part of the team of authors writing the Diplomatic Academy's "International Law" textbook, was head of the Security Council's Expert Group on International Law, and was a member of the editorial boards of the journals "International Lawyer" and "Diplomatic Service". He received numerous awards over his career, including the Order of the Red Banner of Labour and the Order of Friendship of Peoples, prior to his death in 2021.

== Career ==
Khlestov was born in Moscow on 6 June 1923. He studied at the Moscow Institute of Law, graduating in 1945 and joining the People's Commissariat for Foreign Affairs that year. He then attended the Higher Diplomatic School of the Ministry of Foreign Affairs, graduating in 1947. In 1949 he was assigned to the Soviet embassy in Bulgaria, initially based at the consulate in Burgas until 1950, and then the main embassy, before returning to the USSR in 1951 to work in the central offices of the Ministry of Foreign Affairs until 1960.

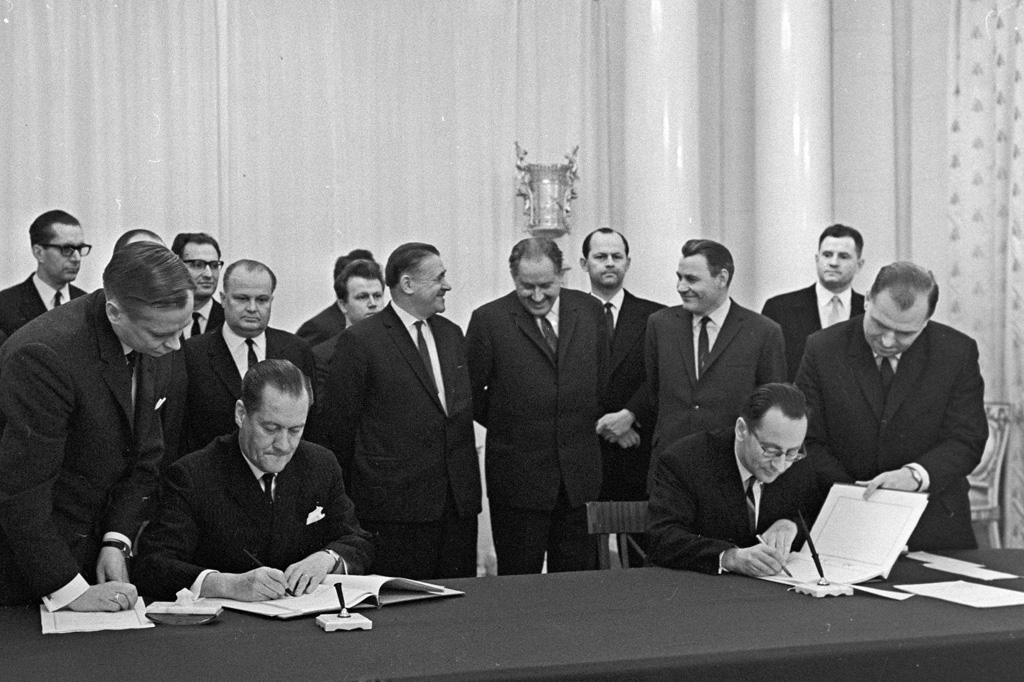
24 January 1966. Khlestov (seated, right) signs a Soviet-Finnish consular convention. His counterpart, Finnish diplomat Veli Helenius, is seated left.

Khlestov was often involved in heading delegations at negotiations between the Warsaw Pact countries and NATO to discuss the reduction of armed forces in Central Europe, as well as at the Vienna conferences on the codification of the law of international treaties (1968-1969) and consular law (1963). He participated in the development of a number of bilateral international treaties; those with the United States included the Consular Convention, On the Prevention of Attack on Space Objects, and On limiting the arms trade. With Finland he helped to negotiate "On the delimitation of the continental shelf in the Gulf of Finland and the northeastern part of the Baltic Sea"; and with Norway "On the delimitation of the continental shelf in the Barents Sea, as well as with other countries." He was also deputy chairman and a member of interdepartmental commissions on the development of international legal problems of space, maritime law, and Spitsbergen, and a member of the board of the Main Directorate of Geodesy and Cartography under the Soviet Council of Ministers, where he was responsible for accurately depicting borders on maps published in the USSR.

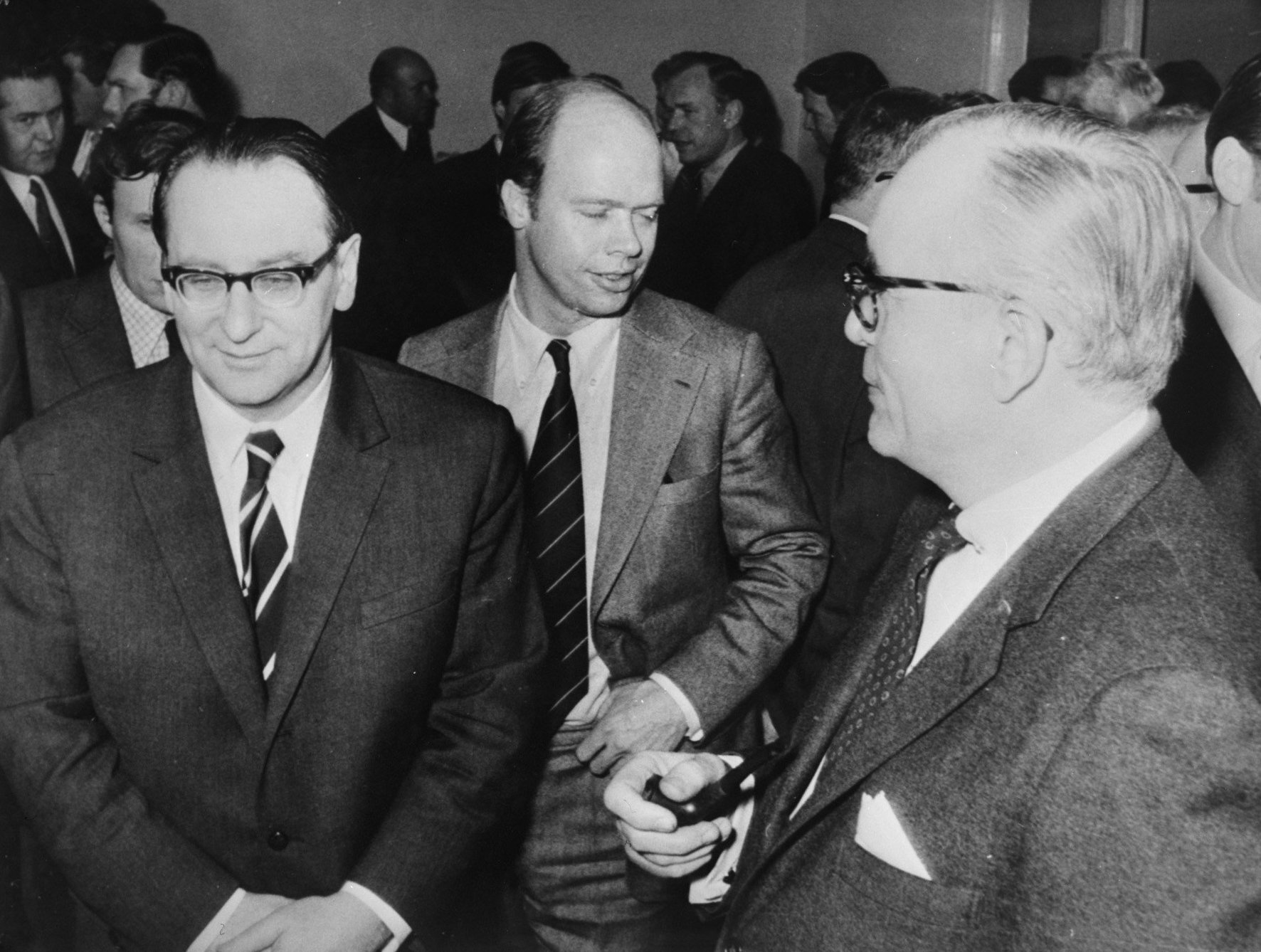
Khlestov in Vienna at the 1973 introductory NATO-Warsaw Pact discussions on troop reductions

From 1960 until 1965 Khlestov was deputy head of the ministry's Treaty and Legal Department, becoming its head from 1965 until 1979. From 1973 he was also a member of the ministry's Collegium. From 1979, until his retirement in 1988, he was Permanent Representative of the USSR to the International Atomic Energy Agency and international organizations in Vienna. By the time of his retirement he had participated in the development of treaties with Bulgaria, Hungary, East Germany, Germany, Poland, Czechoslovakia, Romania, Mongolia, Egypt, India, Iraq. He had also participated in sessions of the UN General Assembly, General Conferences of the International Atomic Energy Agency, and the United Nations Industrial Development Organization, and in conferences on disarmament and nuclear non-proliferation, as well as the development of space law, the UN Declaration on Friendly Relations between States, and the definition of aggression. He participated in the SALT II talks in Moscow in 1977, where United States ambassador to the Soviet Union Malcolm Toon reported to the United States Department of State that "The fact that Ambassador Khlestov will be leading the Soviet team does not seem to us to indicate either rapid or dramatic movement by the Soviets towards presenting a detailed, specific draft declaration or other substantive proposal. Khlestov, while affable, able, patient (witness his years in MBFR), is a mechanic, not a policy innovator."

== Retirement ==
After his retirement at the diplomatic rank of Ambassador Extraordinary and Plenipotentiary, to which he had been appointed in 1973, Khlestov continued to participate in scientific and teaching activities, becoming a professor at the Diplomatic Academy of the Ministry of Foreign Affairs of the Russian Federation. He held the titles of Honored Lawyer of the Russian Federation and Honorary Doctor of the Diplomatic Academy of the Russian Foreign Ministry, and was vice-president of the Russian Association for the Assistance of the United Nations until 1997, and vice-president of the Russian Association of International Law.

A candidate of legal sciences since 1985, Khlestov brought his experience to preparing domestic laws, in 1995 being appointed the representative of the President of the Russian Federation in the Federation Council during the development of the law governing the procedures for deploying Russian Armed Forces abroad. From 1998 until 2004 he was a member of the Expert Council on International Law under the Chairman of the State Duma. His academic work involved over forty years teaching at the Moscow State Institute of International Relations, the Diplomatic Academy of the Ministry of Foreign Affairs, and other institutions. He wrote over 170 publications on international relations and international law, and from 2002 to 2003 he was head of the Department of International and Constitutional Law at Moscow State Linguistic University. He was part of the team of authors writing the Diplomatic Academy's "International Law" textbook. Prior to his death he was head of the Security Council's Expert Group on International Law, and a member of the editorial boards of the journals "International Lawyer" and "Diplomatic Service". In his writings he expressed the view that the doctrine of Russian international law was "to support the government in its foreign policy with legal arguments."

Over his career Khlestov was awarded the Order of the Red Banner of Labour and the Order of Friendship of Peoples, as well as various medals, by the Soviet Union, and received honours from Bulgaria and Mongolia. In addition to his native Russian, he was fluent in English and Bulgarian.

Khlestov died on 31 August 2021 at the age of 98. His obituary by the Russian Ministry of Foreign Affairs described him as "a brilliant, professional, hardworking and responsible person, who was distinguished by a sharp mind, encyclopedic knowledge, intelligence and benevolence."
