= Aleksandr Vezdenetskiy =

Russian footballer

Personal information
- Full name: Aleksandr Sergeyevich Vezdenetskiy
- Date of birth: 6 February 1982 (age 44)
- Place of birth: Novomoskovsk, Tula Oblast, Russian SFSR
- Height: 1.81 m (5 ft 11 in)
- Positions: Midfielder; defender

Team information
- Current team: FC Arsenal Tula (U19 assistant coach)

Senior career*
Years	Team	Apps	(Gls)
2001	FC Don Novomoskovsk	17	(1)
2002	FC Fabus Bronnitsy	36	(0)
2003	FC Dynamo Tula	13	(0)
2003–2005	FC Arsenal Tula	66	(7)
2006	FC Saturn Yegoryevsk	15	(0)
2006–2007	FC Volga Tver	40	(0)
2008	FC Torpedo Vladimir	30	(1)
2009	FC Dnepr Smolensk	14	(0)
2009	FC Ryazan	7	(0)
2010	FC Zvezda Ryazan	6	(0)
2011	FC Arsenal-Tula	9	(0)
2012	FC Khimik Novomoskovsk		

Managerial career
- 2020–: FC Arsenal Tula (U19 assistant)
- * Club domestic league appearances and goals

Aleksandr Sergeyevich Vezdenetskiy (Russian: Александр Сергеевич Везденецкий; born 6 February 1982) is a Russian professional football coach and a former player. He is an assistant coach for the Under-19 squad of FC Arsenal Tula.

== Club career ==
He played in the Russian Football National League for FC Arsenal Tula in 2004.
