= Dmitry Petrov (translator) =

Russian translator, interpreter and television presenter

Dmitry Yuryevich Petrov
- Дмитрий Юрьевич Петров
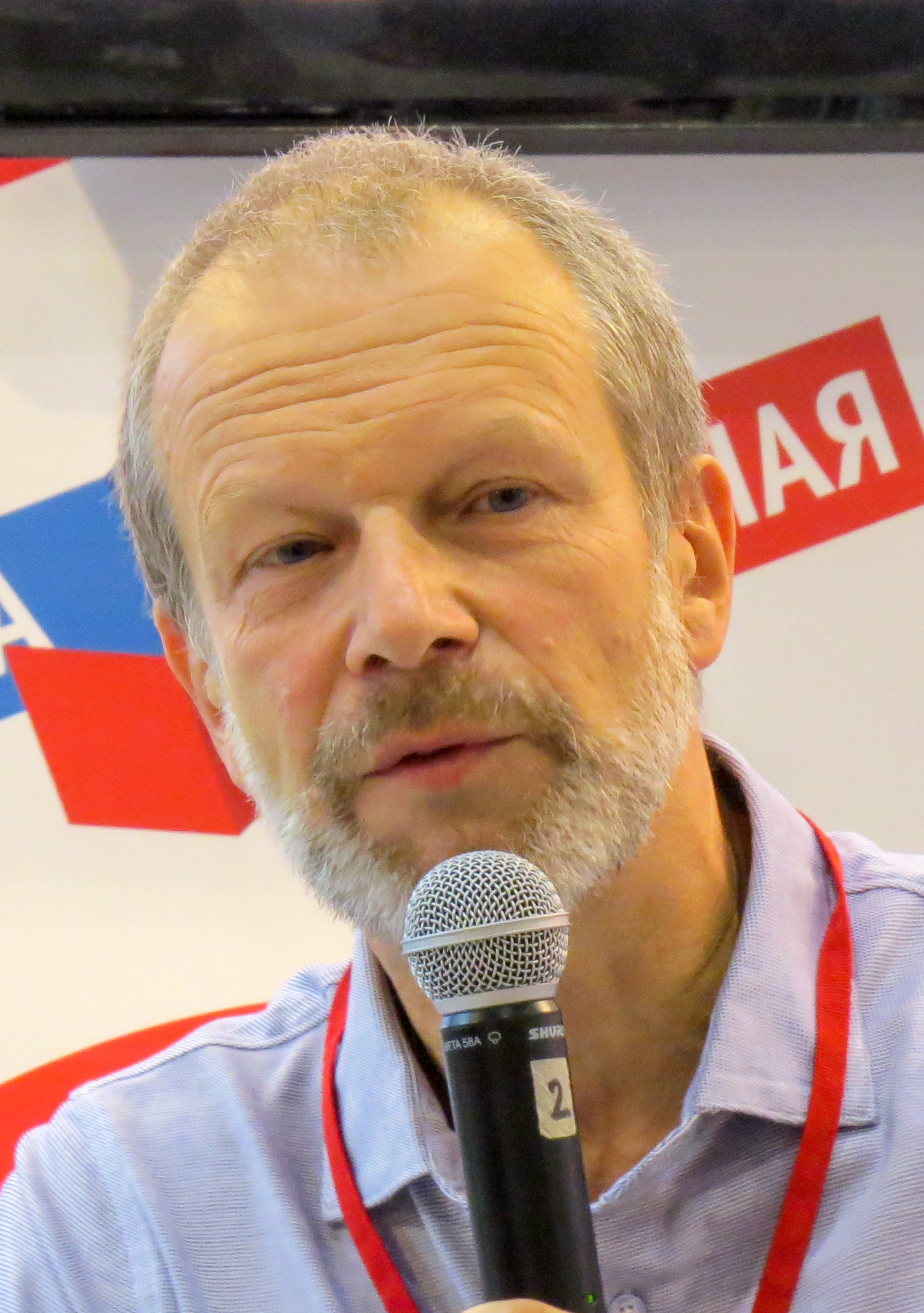
- Dmitry Petrov in 2018
- Born: 16 July 1958 (age 68); Novomoskovsk, Russia, USSR
- Education: Moscow State Linguistic University
- Occupations: Language teacher, language teaching methodologist, course author, interpreter and translator
- Employer(s): Moscow State Linguistic University, Dimitry Petrov's Innovative Communication Linguistics Center, Russia-K TV channel
- Known for: Polyglot-16 language teaching TV show; being multilingual

Dmitry Yuryevich Petrov (Russian: Дмитрий Юрьевич Петров; born 16 July 1958 in Novomoskovsk, Tula Region) is a Russian polyglot, simultaneous interpreter, lecturer, broadcaster, and teacher. He is a host of the reality show Polyglot on the TV channel Russia-K. Finished Translation School of Moscow State Linguistics University where he teaches, as of 2016, at the Department of Translation Studies and English Translation Practice. Since 2012 has his multilingual language school called Dmitry Petrov's Innovative Communication Linguistics Center that works using his 16 academic hour method Polyglot 16, implemented in eponymous course books and mobile applications.

== Biography ==
Dmitry Petrov got into Moscow State Linguistic University in 1975. According to some sources Dmitry Petrov worked with Soviet and Russian presidents. He was an interpreter for Mikhail Gorbachev, Boris Yeltsin, Vladimir Putin.

He says he can read in 50 languages and speak in 30, but in general, he works with 8 languages besides Russian: English, French, Italian, Spanish, German, Czech, Greek, Hindi. His language school website says he mastered over 30 languages.

His wife is from India. Her name is Anamika Saksena (Rus. Анамика Саксена). She was a student of the same university when he was already a teacher there. Her father had worked in Moscow, but left, and she stayed to study and eventually married there. They have two sons and a daughter.

In 2014 Dmitry Petrov won a prestigious TEFI television award for his reality show "Polyglot" on the national intellectual non-profit TV channel Rossiya-K (Russia-K, with K standing in Russian for Kultura "Culture"), teaching English, Chinese and other languages to small groups of popular singers and other media personalities. Each course is supposed to last only 16 hours, which attracts potential students from the stage and general public, but critics say this length will not be sufficient for any real mastering a language with its hundreds of lexical items to learn for even elementary proficiency. As of summer 2020, according to his language teaching center and the TV channel's websites, there have been 8 seasons of his show: English, Italian, French, Spanish, German, Hindi/Urdu, Portuguese, Chinese.

== Literature ==
- Петров Д. Ю., Борейко В. Н. (2010). Магия слова. Диалог о языке и языках. М.: ПрозаиК. p. 208. ISBN 978-5-91631-105-1.
