= Mikhail Slyadnev =

Russian footballer

Personal information
- Full name: Mikhail Mikhailovich Slyadnev
- Date of birth: 19 January 1983 (age 43)
- Place of birth: Novomoskovsk, Tula Oblast, Russian SFSR
- Height: 1.85 m (6 ft 1 in)
- Position: Defender

Youth career
- FC Don Novomoskovsk

Senior career*
Years	Team	Apps	(Gls)
2001–2004	FC Rostov	0	(0)
2005–2006	FC Spartak-MZhK Ryazan	23	(0)
2006	FC Oryol	4	(0)
2007	FC Sportakademklub Moscow	0	(0)
2008	FC Istra	8	(0)
2009	FC SKA Rostov-on-Don	16	(0)
- * Club domestic league appearances and goals

Mikhail Mikhailovich Slyadnev (Russian: Михаил Михайлович Сляднёв; born 19 January 1983) is a former Russian professional football player.

== Club career ==
He played in the Russian Football National League for FC Oryol in 2006.
