= Olga Anikst =

Russian revolutionary and Soviet educator

- О́льга А́никст
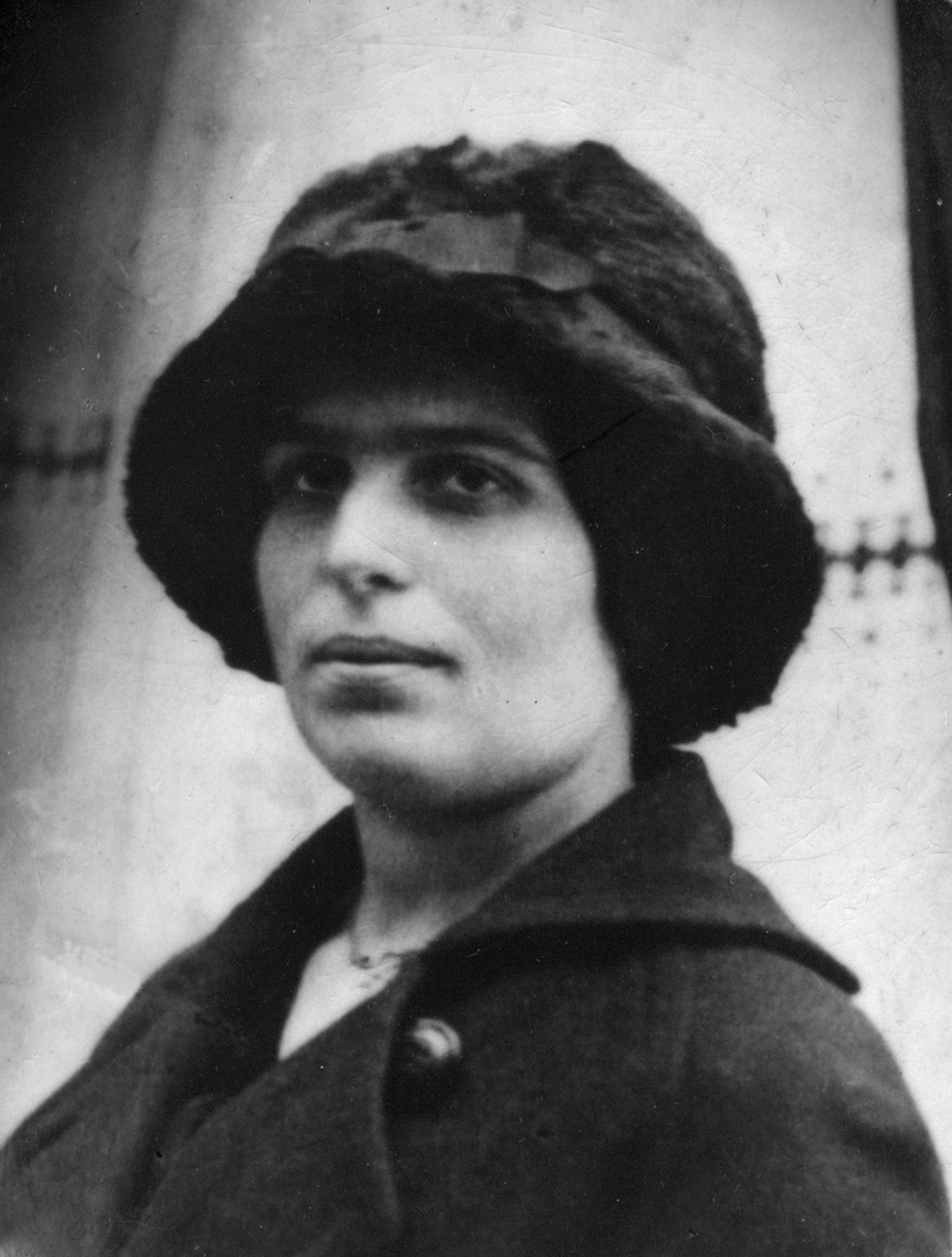
- Born: Elka Gershevna Braverman; June 13, 1886; Chișinău, Bessarabia Governorate, Russian Empire (now Moldova)
- Died: September 9, 1959 (aged 73); Sverdlovsk, Russian SFSR, Soviet Union
- Occupations: Educator, pedagogue, revolutionary
- Known for: Founder of the Moscow State Linguistic University
- Spouse: Abram Anikst

Olga Grigoryevna Anikst (Russian: О́льга Григо́рьевна А́никст; née Elka Gershevna Braverman; 1 (13) June 1886 – 9 September 1959) was a Russian revolutionary and Soviet educator, organizer of vocational education in the Russian SFSR, and the founder and first rector of the Moscow Institute of Foreign Languages.

== Biography ==
=== Early life and education ===
Olga Anikst (Elka Gershevna Braverman) was born in Chișinău, Bessarabia Governorate (present-day Moldova) into a large working-class family. Her father, Gersh-Leib Leyzerovich Braverman, was a worker at a tobacco factory; her mother was Ester-Tsivya Mordko-Yosevna. She was the thirteenth of eighteen children.

She studied at the private Skomorovskaya Gymnasium and in 1905 graduated with distinction from the Chișinău Jewish Vocational School for Girls, operated by the Jewish Colonization Association, where instruction was conducted in Yiddish. She specialized in cardboard and haberdashery production. Arithmetic at the school was taught by Polina Osipovna Efrusi.

In 1903, Anikst was elected a delegate to the South Russian Union of Students. In December the same year, she attended her first social democratic meeting, growing closer to the Bolshevik faction. During the Russian Revolution of 1905, she participated in revolutionary events in Odessa.

=== Revolutionary activity and emigration ===
In 1906, she was employed at a cardboard factory in Yekaterinoslav (now Dnipro), where she was arrested and sentenced to one year of imprisonment. After her release in 1907, she returned to Chișinău and soon illegally crossed into the Austro-Hungarian Empire, settling in Czernowitz (present-day Chernivtsi, Ukraine), where the family of her future husband, Abram Giterman, lived.

In 1908, she emigrated to Germany, working at a leather factory in Frankfurt am Main. She later moved to France, where she married Abram Giterman-Anikst in Paris. From late 1909 she resided in Switzerland – in Zurich and Lausanne, and from 1913 in Geneva.

From 1915, on the recommendation of Vladimir Lenin and Nadezhda Krupskaya, she worked as secretary of the Society for the Aid of Exiles and Political Prisoners.

=== Return to Russia and educational work ===
In May 1917, Anikst returned to Russia with her husband and two children in a sealed train used by political émigrés. She settled in Pavlohrad and worked as a clerk in the Food Administration.

In 1918, she moved to Moscow and devoted herself to the organization of vocational education. She served as head of the educational department of the People's Commissariat for Trade and Industry.

She was among the initiators of the creation of the State Committee for Vocational Education under the People's Commissariat for Education (Narkompros) of the Russian SFSR and was a member of this body from December 1918 to March 1919. Subsequently, she served as deputy chair of the Section for Vocational and Technical Education (April 1919 – January 1920).

From December 1920, Anikst was a member of the Council of People's Commissars commission on overcoming the labor crisis (the so-called Trotsky Commission), which proposed the establishment of Glavprofobr (the Main Directorate of Vocational Education).

She became a member of the collegium and deputy chair of Glavprofobr and until 1928 headed its department for workers’ education and lower vocational schools. She supervised the creation of vocational schools, factory apprenticeship schools (ФЗУ), reforms of the apprenticeship system, and the training of workers directly in production.

=== Academic and editorial activity ===
From 1923, Anikst served as editor of the journal Life of the Workers’ School and was an organizer of the First All-Russian Congress on the Education of Adolescent Workers (1922) and the All-Union Congress on Workers’ Education (1924).

From 1927, she was academic secretary of the Scientific-Pedagogical Section of the State Academic Council of Narkompros.

In the mid-1920s, she participated in a public debate with A. K. Gastev, director of the Central Institute of Labour, on whether vocational schools should be considered institutions of secondary vocational education or craft schools. She criticized narrowly specialized approaches to worker training.

=== Moscow Institute of Foreign Languages ===
After a study trip to Germany in 1930 to examine foreign-language teaching methods, Anikst founded the Moscow Institute of Foreign Languages and became its first rector.

From 1932, she worked at the All-Union Central Council of Trade Unions, supervising professional development in industry and the dissemination of technical knowledge. She later worked in the society Technology for the Masses and from December 1935 served as head of the Directorate of Educational Institutions at the People's Commissariat of Local Industry of the Russian SFSR.

=== Repression and later life ===
After the arrest of her husband, Anikst was expelled from the Communist Party of the Soviet Union and transferred to work at Muzprokat. On 29 March 1938, the day after her husband was executed, she was arrested and sentenced to eight years in corrective labor camps as a family member of a traitor to the Motherland.

She was sent to the Temnikovsky Corrective Labor Camps in the Mordovian ASSR, where she worked in garment production. After her release in December 1945, she lived in internal exile in Sverdlovsk Oblast (first in Sysert, later in Sverdlovsk).

She was rehabilitated in 1955.

=== Death ===
Olga Anikst died on 9 September 1959 in Sverdlovsk. She was initially buried at Mikhailovskoye Cemetery; her remains were later reinterred at the Yekaterinburg Northern Cemetery.

== Works and memoirs ==
Anikst authored numerous articles in journals such as Public Education, For Pedagogical Cadres, and Bulletin of Vocational Education. Her major works include:

- Workers’ Education in the Russian SFSR (Moscow: Novaya Moskva, 1925)
- Training of Skilled Workers (Moscow: Gosizdat, 1928)

She also left memoirs of her life and meetings with Vladimir Lenin, Nadezhda Krupskaya, Anatoly Lunacharsky, Vladimir Mayakovsky, Dmitry Furmanov, Clara Zetkin, and Sholem Aleichem.
