= Abram Anikst =

Russian revolutionary and Soviet politician

- Абра́м А́никст
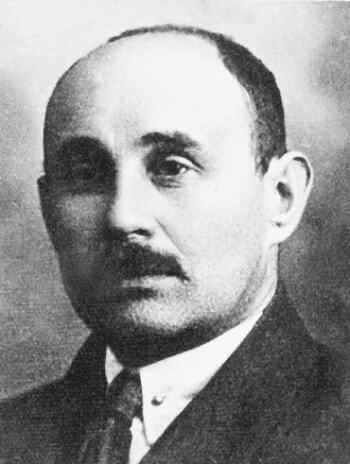

People's Commissar for Labor of the Ukrainian Soviet Socialist Republic
- In office 1923–1925

Deputy People's Commissar of Labor of the Russian Socialist Federative Soviet Republic
- In office 1919–1922

Personal details
- Born: Abram Moiseyevich Giterman; May 1887 Chișinău, Bessarabia Governorate, Russian Empire (now Moldova)
- Died: March 19, 1938 (aged 50) Moscow, Russian SFSR, Soviet Union
- Party: All-Union Communist Party (Bolsheviks) (1918–1937)
- Other political affiliations: General Jewish Labor Bund (1904–1906)
- Spouse: Olga Anikst
- Occupation: Revolutionary, economist, politician, statesman, writer

Abram Moiseyevich Anikst (Russian: Абра́м Моисе́евич А́никст; birth surname Giterman; Yiddish: אברהם מאיסייעוויטש אניקסט; May 1887 – 19 March 1938) was a Russian revolutionary and Soviet politician, statesman and economist.

== Biography ==
Abram Anikst was born in May 1887 in Chișinău, Bessarabia Governorate (present-day Moldova) into the family of a stonemason, Moisey Shmulevich Giterman (1856–1929), a native of Leova, and his wife Livsha Abramovna Gandelman (1860–1943). He completed a four-year primary school and continued his education through self-study.

He became involved in the revolutionary movement in southern Russia in 1904, attending meetings of the Bund study circles. In 1906–1907 he was an anarcho-communist, because he regarded the Bundists as too moderate. In 1907, after being sentenced to ten years of hard labor for preparing explosive materials in Chișinău, he escaped abroad to Austria-Hungary, settling Czernowitz (present-day Chernivtsi, Ukraine). His parents also fled there; his mother spent three months in the Chișinău prison due to the illegal use of their home. Among those prosecuted in the so-called “Explosion on Svechnaya Street” case was S. G. Braverman, the brother of Anikst’s future wife, who later described these events in the novella The Explosion on Svechnaya (1926).

From Czernowitz, together with Olga Braverman (whom he married in 1908), Anikst moved to Frankfurt am Main and later to Paris, where he worked as an electrician for the General Electricity Company. At the end of 1909 he was sent to work in the canton of St. Gallen in Switzerland, and in 1910 he moved to Zurich to join his parents. His first child, Isaac, was born there. He subsequently worked as an electrician in Lausanne, returned to Paris in 1912, and later worked in Geneva, remaining employed throughout by the same company.

During this period, Anikst took part in the anarcho-syndicalist movement and was a member of the foreign group of Russian anarcho-syndicalists. He used the party pseudonym “Rabochiy Alfa” (“Worker Alpha”), under which he contributed to the anarcho-syndicalist publication Rabocheye Znamya (Workers’ Banner).

In May 1917 he returned to Russia in a sealed train, together with his wife and two children. Although remaining formally non-partisan, he cooperated with the Bolsheviks, worked for the Russian branch of the General Electricity Company in Kharkiv, and served as chairman of the Pavlohrad Council of Workers’ Deputies in the Yekaterinoslav Governorate.

In 1918 Anikst moved to Petrograd and joined the Russian Communist Party (Bolsheviks). From 1919 to 1922 he was the Deputy People’s Commissar for Labor of the Russian SFSR. In 1920 he simultaneously served as Deputy Chairman of the Main Committee for universal labor conscription. He participated in discussions on the importation of foreign workers into Russia and, on 8 June 1920, submitted to the Council of People's Commissars a draft decree titled “On the Procedure for the Resettlement of Workers from Abroad”.

In these positions, Anikst planned the implementation of forced labor within the framework of the so-called "Labor Armies" (Russian: Трудовые армии), an initiative spearheaded by Leon Trotsky. His responsibilities included:

- Policy Development: Drafting regulatory documents regarding the scale and methods of forced labor.
- Operational Management: Assigning quotas for the formation of labor armies and identifying specific industrial or agricultural sites to be "serviced" by these units.
- Discipline and Incentives: Proposing systems of rewards and punishments for the labor army members (trudarmeytsy).

Historical accounts attribute the deaths of many laborers to Anikst's administrative approach. He reportedly ignored safety protocols and medical services entirely. Furthermore, the provision of fuel for the workers was dismissed as a "luxury," and food rations were so insufficient that workers were often physically unable to perform their duties.

Due to the catastrophic population losses of the Russian Civil War and mass emigration, the country faced a severe labor shortage. To address this, Anikst introduced a bill to recruit foreign workers. The project was approved and granted significant funding. Initially, Anikst proposed recruiting European and American workers by appealing to their "class solidarity", though few responded to the call. Following this failure, an attempt was made to recruit Chinese laborers abroad, which also proved unsuccessful. Subsequently, Anikst adopted a more coercive strategy:

- Forced Mobilization: He began the forced conscription of Chinese nationals already residing in the RSFSR into "socialist construction" projects.
- Prisoners of War: Former German and Austrian prisoners of war were also targeted for labor.

The initiative ultimately collapsed. The German and Austrian prisoners had to be released to avoid diplomatic conflict with Berlin, a move prioritized by Vladimir Lenin. Meanwhile, the Chinese recruits (including many honghuzi) were willing to serve in punitive detachments of the Red Army and the Cheka, but proved ineffective as manual laborers.

The project was eventually shut down and the allocated funds were written off. As a result of this failure, Anikst was removed from his post. After a period of unemployment, he was appointed Deputy Chairman of the Gosplan of the RSFSR, where he oversaw issues related to statistics and accounting.

From 1922 to 1923 he served as Deputy Chairman of the Ural Regional Economic Council. Between 1923 and 1925 he was People’s Commissar for Labor of the Ukrainian SSR and worked for the Central Committee of the miners’ trade union and the Central Committee of the builders’ trade union. From late 1925 he worked at Gosplan of the Russian SFSR, was a member of its presidium, and in the final years of his life served as Deputy Chairman. Throughout the 1920s he published regularly in the journal Voprosy Truda (Questions of Labor).

Anikst lived in Moscow, where he was arrested on 2 November 1937 during the Great Purge. He was sentenced to death on 19 March 1938 and executed by shooting on the same day. He was rehabilitated in 1956.
