= Vladimir Yerofeyev (diplomat) =

Russian diplomat (1920–2011)

Permanent Representative of the USSR to International Organizations in Vienna
- In office 1975–1979
- Preceded by: Georgy Arkadev
- Succeeded by: Oleg Khlestov

Ambassador of the Soviet Union to Senegal
- In office 14 January 1963 – 25 August 1966
- Preceded by: None
- Succeeded by: Anatoly Kulazhenkov

Ambassador of the Soviet Union to The Gambia
- In office 25 September 1965 – 25 August 1966
- Preceded by: None
- Succeeded by: Anatoly Kulazhenkov

Personal details
- Born: Vladimir Ivanovich Yerofeyev; 9 October 1920 Petrograd, RSFSR
- Died: 18 July 2011 (aged 90) Moscow, Russia
- Education: Moscow State Linguistic University
- Awards: Order of the Red Banner of Labour; Order of the Red Star

Vladimir Ivanovich Yerofeyev (Russian: Владимир Иванович Ерофеев, 9 October 1920 – 18 July 2011) was a Soviet diplomat, personal French language translator for Joseph Stalin (beginning in 1945) and the father of writer Viktor Yerofeyev.
