= Jeremy Isaacs =

Scottish television producer and executive, and opera manager

Sir Jeremy Isaacs
- Born: Jeremy Israel Isaacs; 28 September 1932 (age 94); Glasgow, Scotland
- Education: Merton College, Oxford
- Occupations: Television producer; executive; opera manager
- Years active: 1958–2000

Sir Jeremy Israel Isaacs (born 28 September 1932) is a Scottish television producer and executive, and an opera manager.

Following a career at Granada Television, the BBC and Thames Television, Isaacs was the founding chief executive of Channel 4 in 1982, serving in the role until 1987. He won the BAFTA Fellowship in 1985, the British Film Institute Fellowship in 1986, and the International Emmy Directorate Award in 1987. He was also the General Director of the Royal Opera House from 1987 to 1996. A recipient of many British Academy Television Awards and International Emmy Awards, Isaacs was knighted in the 1996 Birthday Honours "for services to Broadcasting and to the Arts."

== Early life ==
Isaacs was born in Glasgow from what were described as "Scottish Jewish roots" of Lithuanian-Jewish origins. He grew up in Hillhead, the son of a jeweller and a GP, and is a cousin to virologist Alick Isaacs. He was educated at the independent Glasgow Academy and Merton College, Oxford, where he read Classics. Whilst at Oxford he served as President of the Oxford Union. He also served in the Royal Scots Fusiliers.

== Television career ==
Isaacs began his career in television when he joined Granada Television in Manchester as a producer in 1958. At Granada he was involved in creating or supervising series such as World in Action and What the Papers Say. He worked for the BBC's Panorama in the 1960s and was the overall producer for the 26-episode series The World at War (1973–74) for Thames Television. He was Director of Programmes for Thames between 1974 and 1978. He produced Ireland: A Television History (1981) for the BBC and co-produced the twenty-four episode television documentary series Cold War (1998) and the ten-part series Millennium (1999).

=== Channel 4 ===
Isaacs was the founding chief executive of Channel 4 between 1981 and 1987, overseeing its launch period and setting the channel's original cultural approach with opera and foreign language film, although programmes with popular appeal such as the game show Countdown, the pop music series The Tube, and soap opera Brookside had a place in the schedule from the beginning. The channel commissioned Michael Elliott's production of King Lear (1983) with Laurence Olivier in the title role and Isaacs recommissioned a number of programmes from his time at Granada including What the Papers Say. Isaac's launched his concept for Channel 4 during the James MacTaggart Memorial Lecture at the Edinburgh TV Festival in 1979.

Isaacs' appointment of David Rose, previously long with the BBC, as the Commissioning Editor for Fiction led to the channel's involvement with the 1980s revival of the British film industry via the Film on Four strand. Despite a general liberal atmosphere, a few commissioned programmes, such as Ken Loach's A Question of Leadership, were withdrawn from transmission.

In 1989, Isaacs named 26 personal favourites from his tenure as Channel 4's chief executive, running from A (the discussion series After Dark) to Z (a four-hour dramatisation of a Gothic horror novel, Zastrozzi).

When handing over responsibility for running the channel to Michael Grade, Isaacs threatened to throttle him if he betrayed the trust placed in him to respect the channel's remit.

== Later career ==
After leaving Channel 4 at the end of 1987, and having failed to be appointed director-general of the BBC, Isaacs became General Director of The Royal Opera House, Covent Garden, a role he fulfilled until 1996. This was a difficult period for the ROH, which was not helped by the broadcast of the revealing The House (1996) documentary series on BBC2. Isaacs also served on the Board of Governors of the British Film Institute in the 1980s.

From 1989 to 1998, Isaacs was the interviewer in a revival of the BBC series Face to Face; the former politician and journalist John Freeman had filled this role in the original 1959–62 run.

Between 1997 and 2000, Isaacs was president of the Royal Television Society. He was also chairman of Artsworld before it was sold to Sky.

== Publications ==
- Storm Over 4: A Personal Account, Weidenfeld & Nicolson, 1989
- Never Mind the Moon, Bantam Press, 1999 ISBN 0-593-04355-3
- Look Me in the Eye: A Life in Television, Little, Brown, 2006 ISBN 0-316-72728-8
- Cold War (In collaboration with Taylor Downing), Bantam Press, 1998 ISBN 0-593-04309-X

Cultural offices
Preceded by Michael Grade	President of the Royal Television Society; 1997–2000	Succeeded by Will Wyatt
Media offices
Preceded by (new position)	Chief Executive of Channel 4; 1981–1987	Succeeded by Michael Grade
