= Moscow State Linguistic University =

University in Moscow, Russia

- Московский государственный лингвистический университет
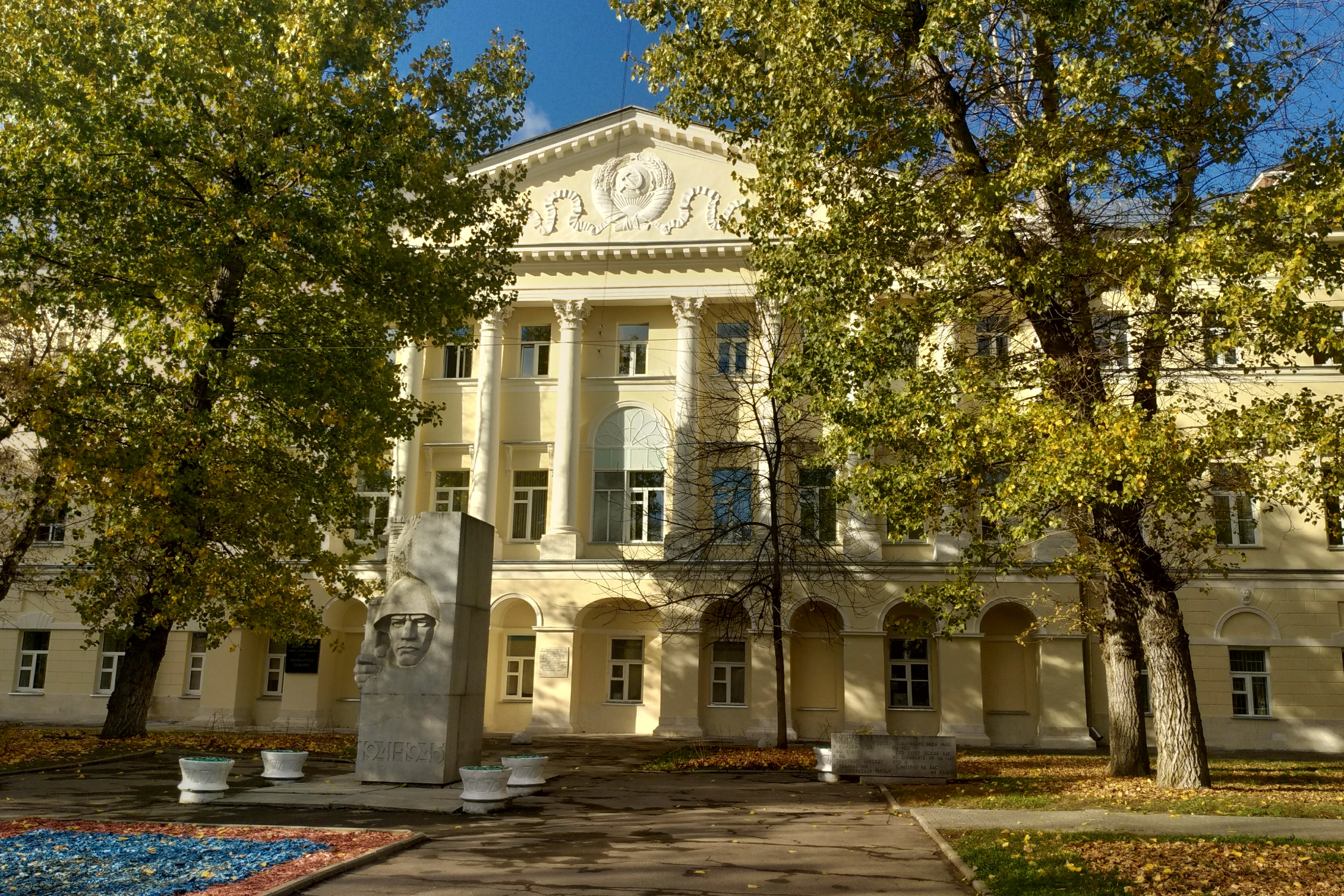
- Other name: InYaz (Russian: ИнЯз)
- Former names: Moscow Imperial Commercial School (1804–1917); Moscow Institute of New Languages (1930–1935); Maurice Thorez Moscow State Pedagogical Institute of Foreign Languages (1935–1990)
- Motto: Lingua facit pacem
- Type: Public
- Established: 1804 (1930)
- Founder: Alexander I of Russia
- Rector: Irina Kraeva
- Location: Moscow, Russia; 55.738754°N 37.594893°E
- Campus: Urban
- Website: linguanet.ru
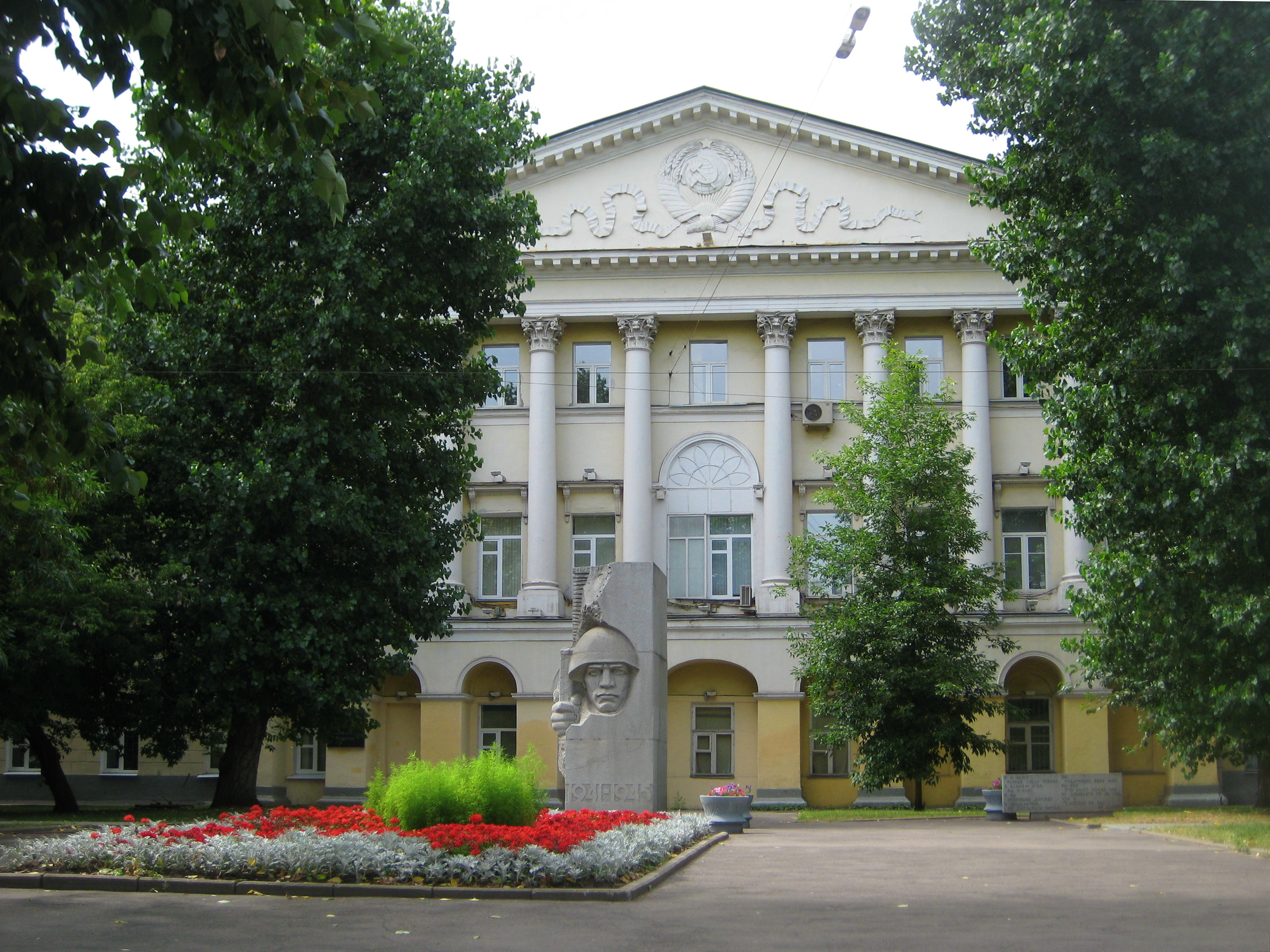

University rankings

Regional – Overall
- QS Emerging Europe and Central Asia: 301-350 (2022)

Moscow State Linguistic University (Russian: Московский государственный лингвистический университет, МГЛУ, romanized: Moskovskiy gosudarstvennyy lingvisticheskiy universitet), previously known as Maurice Thorez Moscow State Pedagogical Institute of Foreign Languages (Russian: Московский государственный педагогический институт иностранных языков имени Мориса Тореза, МГПИИЯ им. Мориса Тореза, romanized: Moskovskiy gosudarstvennyy pedagogicheskiy institut inostrannykh yazykov imeni Morisa Toreza and still often referred to as InYaz) is a university in Moscow, Russia. It is the largest and the oldest university in Russia that specializes in linguistics and foreign languages. There are about 10,000 students and postgraduates in the university. Education is available in 35 languages.

== History ==
- 1804 – By the High Ukaz of Emperor Alexander I, the Moscow Imperial Commercial School is created teaching the English, French, German, and Latin languages.
- 1806 – The school moves into a historic building – the house of the former general-governor of Moscow, Peter Eropkin, on Ostozhenka (today this is the main campus of MSLU).
- 1930 – 13 years after the Russian Revolution a school of languages is revived within the same building as previously: by the order of NARKOM the Moscow Institute of New Languages is created. The first rector is O. G. Anikst.
- 1935 – The institute's name is changed to the Moscow State Pedagogical Institute of Foreign Languages (MSPIFL).
- 1941 – In the building of the institute the 5th Militia Division of Frunzensky District is formed and many students and faculty become members.
- 1945 – Alumni and faculty of MSPIFL interpret at the Nuremberg and Tokyo Trials.
- 1964 – MSPIFL is renamed in the honour of Maurice Thorez, a long-time leader of the French Communist Party and a prominent figure in the international communist movement, and becomes the Maurice Thorez Moscow State Pedagogical Institute of Foreign Languages.
- 1990 – MSPIFL is renamed Moscow State Linguistic University (MGLU).
- 2000 – By the decision of the Heads of Government of CIS member states, MGLU is named a core organization of the language and culture of CIS member states.
- 2001–2004 – MGLU becomes host to the Center of Armenian Language and Culture, the Center of Kazakh Language and Culture, and the first Center of Ukrainian studies in Russia.
- 1998 – 2005 – At MGLU the Center of German Language and Culture, the Center of Francophone Studies, the Center of Spanish Language and Culture, and the Center of the Languages and Cultures of Canada are opened.
- From 2001 – MGLU is the coordinator of the European Day of Languages for Russia and the rest of the CIS states.
- 2005 – At MGLU the Center of Russian Language and Culture is opened to focus on the teaching of foreign students of MGLU who are interested in broadening and deepening their knowledge in the areas of Russian language and culture.
- 2005 – In accordance with a decision of the Academic Council of Moscow State Linguistic University, in November 2005 the University established an Information Centre for Global Security Affairs.
- 2007 – With the support of the Turkish Embassy, a Center of Turkish Language and Culture is opened at MGLU.

== Faculties ==
- Faculty of English language
- Institute of Law, Economics and Information Management
- Faculty of humanitarian and applied sciences
- Faculty of translation and interpretation
- Faculty of German language
- Faculty of French language
- Faculty of distance education
- Faculty of military education
- Faculty of education of foreign citizens
- Faculty of lecturers' advanced training
- Institute of international relations and social-political studies

== Recent activities ==
MSLU organized the III International Russian Hispanistic Conference.

== Notable alumni ==
Russian novelist Ivan Goncharov (MICS, 1830)

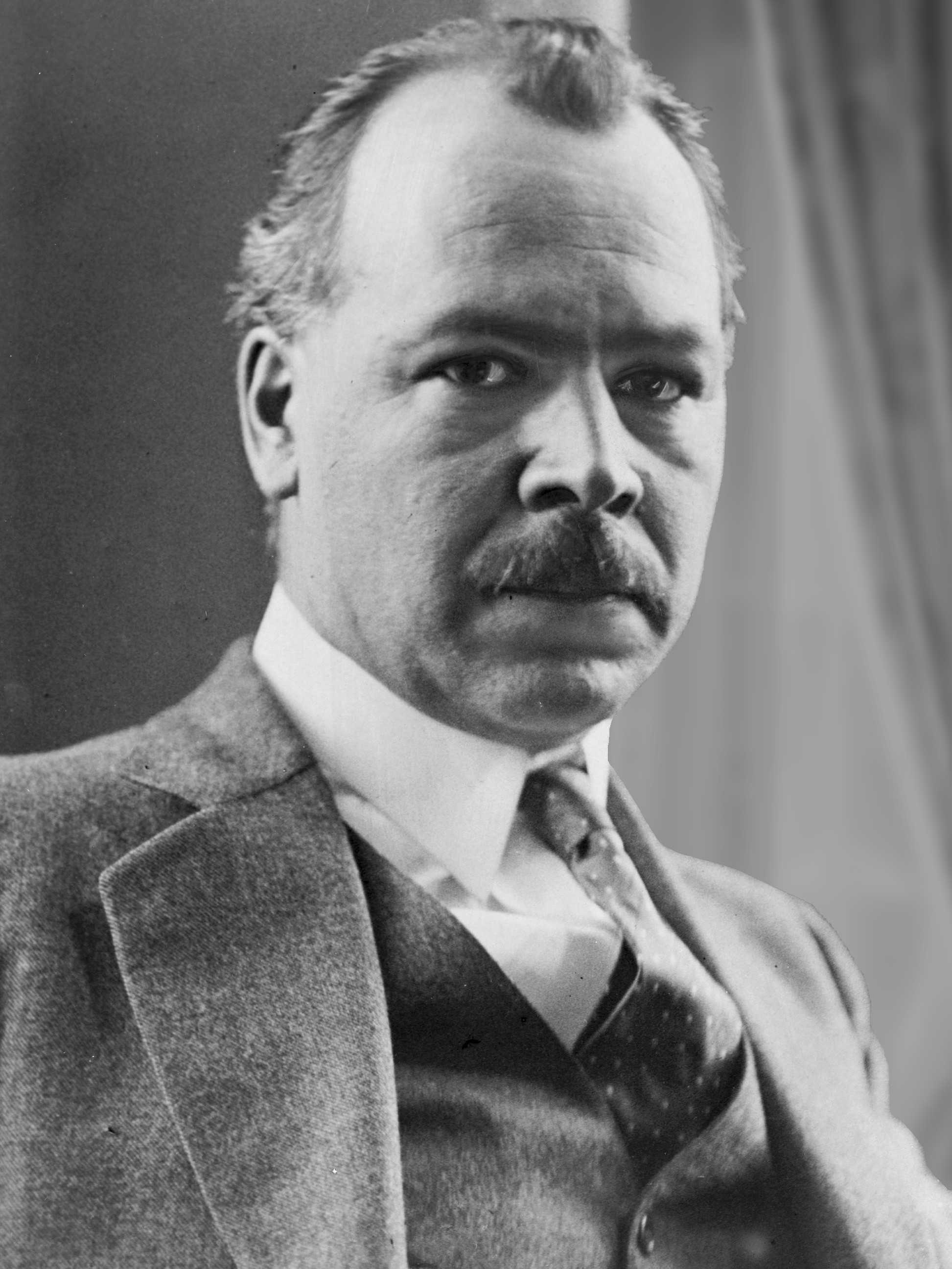
Russian and Soviet botanist and geneticist Nikolai Vavilov (MICS, 1906)

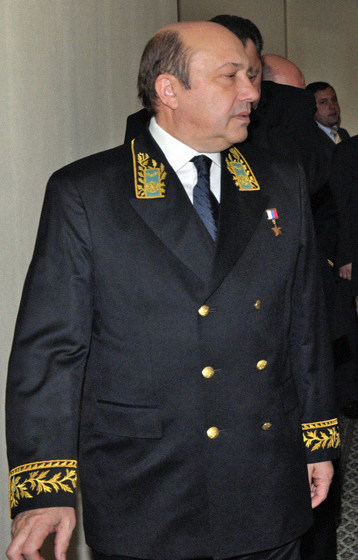
3rd Foreign Minister of Russia and former Secretary of the Security Council of the Russian Federation Igor Ivanov (FTI, 1969)
