= 1938 in aviation =

This is a list of aviation-related events from 1938:

== Events ==
- Imperial Airways inaugurates scheduled service from London to Montreal. Pan American World Airways is banned from British airports out of fears that more advanced U.S. aircraft will drive Imperial out of the transatlantic market.
- The National Trophy, the Harmon Trophy presented to the outstanding aviator for the year in each of the 21 member countries of the International League of Aviators, is awarded for the last time, although the annual award of the Harmon Trophy to the world's outstanding aviator, aviatrix (female aviator), and aeronaut (balloon or dirigible aviator or aviatrix) continues.
- The Imperial Japanese Navy's air arm conducts a six-month bombing campaign against Hankou and other centers of Chinese resistance in central China.
- The Civil Aeronautics Authority is established in the United States and takes over operation of the air traffic control system.
- The Spanish Republicans attempt to develop an aircraft manufacturing industry. They build 169 copies of the Soviet Polikarpov I-15 fighter during 1938, but never use any of them in combat in the Spanish Civil War.
- Late 1938 – Under Japanese supervision, the Manshū Aircraft Company is formed in Harbin, Manchukuo.

=== January ===
- Early January – Nationalist aircraft conduct a heavy bombing campaign against Barcelona, Spain.
- January 6 – Spanish Republican Minister of Defense Indalecio Prieto y Tuero proposes to the Nationalists that both sides in the Spanish Civil War ban air attacks on cities and towns in rear areas. The Nationalists reply that they will continue to bomb Barcelona unless its industries are evacuated.
- January 10 – Northwest Airlines Flight 2, a Lockheed 14H Super Electra, crashes in the Bridger Mountains 12 miles (19 km) northeast of Bozeman, Montana, killing all 10 people on board. Among the dead is aviation pioneer Nick Mamer, who had been piloting the aircraft. It is the first fatal accident involving Northwest Airlines or a Lockheed Super Electra.
- January 11 – During history's second scheduled air mail and cargo flight from the United States to New Zealand, the Pan American Airways Sikorsky S-42B flying boat Samoan Clipper — which had set out on the flight from Honolulu on January 9 — explodes in mid-air over the Pacific Ocean shortly after takeoff from Pago Pago, American Samoa, where it had made a stop. No passengers are aboard the plane, but its entire crew of seven is killed, including Pan American's chief pilot, Ed Musick, who had been piloting the aircraft. The loss of the Samoan Clipper leaves Pan American without an aircraft for the New Zealand service, which it discontinues.
- January 17 – Spanish Nationalist Fiat CR.32 fighters clash with Republican Polikarpov fighters over the front lines at Teruel, Spain, during the Battle of Teruel.
- January 20 – A Flight Refuelling Ltd Armstrong Whitworth AW.23 refuels an Imperial Airways Short Empire over Southampton Water.
- January 26 – Spanish Republican Air Force aircraft bomb Seville and Valladolid.
- January 28 – A 90-second air raid on Barcelona by nine Mallorca-based Italian Savoia-Marchetti SM.79 bombers kills 150 people and injures 500.

=== February ===
- Luftwaffe test pilot Hanna Reitsch flies a Focke-Wulf Fw 61 helicopter indoors at the Deutschlandhalle sports arena in Berlin, Germany, demonstrating the sensitivity of its controls and the ease of flying it.
- February 2 – Two United States Navy PBY-2 Catalina flying boats flying in formation in darkness collide in mid-air and crash into the Pacific Ocean off California's San Clemente Island, killing one PBY's entire crew of seven and three of the six men aboard the other PBY.
- February 6 – The Short Mayo Composite aircraft achieves its first separation in flight.
- February 9 – On takeoff in fog from Marignane-Berre Seaplane Base at Marseille, France, the Air France Lioré et Olivier LeO H-242/1 flying boat Ville de Bone (registration F-ANPB) strikes the breakwater and crashes near Étang de Berre, killing seven of the 14 people on board.
- February 10 – With the assistance of a very strong tailwind, Royal Air Force Squadron Leader (later Wing Commander) John W. Gillan (DFC & bar, AFC) flies a Hawker Hurricane Mark 1 of No. 111 Squadron from Turnhouse, Edinburgh, Scotland, to Northolt, West London, England, in 48 minutes at an average indicated air speed of 408.75 mph (657.82 km/h).
- February 13 – Flying in bad weather, an Ala Littoria CANT Z.506 floatplane (registration I-ORIA) crashes into the Mediterranean Sea off Sardinia, killing all 14 people on board.
- February 15–27 – Six United States Army Air Corps B-17 Flying Fortresses make a goodwill tour of Latin America, traveling 12,000 miles (19,000 km) from the United States to Lima, Peru; Buenos Aires, Argentina; Santiago, Chile; and back to the United States

=== March ===
- March 1 – A Transcontinental & Western Air Douglas DC-2 flying from San Francisco, California, to Winslow, Arizona, crashes in Yosemite National Park in Madera County, California, during bad weather, killing all nine people on board. Despite an extensive search, the aircraft's wreckage is not found until June 12.
- March 7
  - The Air France Potez 62 La Tapageuse (registration F-ANQR) crashes at Datia, India, shortly after takeoff from Dum Dum Airport in Calcutta, killing all seven people on board.
  - Spanish Nationalist forces begin an offensive in Aragon, supported by German aircraft of the Condor Legion. The Condor Legion by this time has two Messerschmitt Bf 109 groups of four squadrons, two Heinkel He 51 groups of two squadrons, four bomber groups of three squadrons equipped with Heinkel He 111s and Junkers Ju 52s, and a reconnaissance group of three squadrons equipped with Heinkels and Dornier Do 17s.
- March 7–17 – The Aragon Offensive sees retreating Republican forces bombarded by German Heinkel He 111s and Italian Savoia-Marchetti SM.79s escorted by Messerschmitt Bf 109s and Fiat CR.32s, with German Dornier Do 17 reconnaissance planes assisting in the location of targets.
- March 12 – Junkers Ju 52s carry German troops to Vienna during the German Anschluss against Austria.
- March 16 – Belfast Harbour Airport in Northern Ireland is opened, with the inaugural commercial flight to Glasgow.
- March 16–18 – Italian aircraft based on Mallorca carry out a heavy, round-the-clock bombing of Barcelona, conducting seventeen air raids at three-hour intervals. Making no attempt to strike military targets specifically, they hit all parts of the city, killing about 1,300 people and injuring about 2,000.
- March 22 – The Nationalist Aragon Offensive resumes. Bombing and strafing German, Italian, and Spanish Nationalist aircraft play a large role in terrorizing and routing Republican ground forces for the remainder of the offensive.
- March 23 – An Air France Dewoitine D.338 (registration F-AQBB) crashes into Pic des Cinq-Croix in the French Pyrenees during a flight from Oran, French Algeria, to Toulouse, France, at an altitude of 2,100 meters (6,900 feet), killing all eight people on board.
- Late March – The British Chiefs of Staff Committee warns that in any confrontation with Germany over Czechoslovakia, the Luftwaffe would dominate the sky and that it might devote its entire force to attacking the United Kingdom as the best way of winning the war.

=== April ===
- April 19 – The Aragon Offensive ends, with Spanish Nationalists having routed Republican forces and cut Republican-controlled Spain in two. Nationalist air superiority has proven decisive in their victory, and both the Germans supporting the Nationalists and the Soviets supporting the Republicans have learned a great deal about fighter support to infantry.
- April 20 – British Air Commodore Arthur Travers Harris makes a purchasing trip to the United States to select aircraft to expand the Royal Air Force. The Lockheed Hudson and North American Harvard are chosen.
- April 25 – After a Pan American Airways Sikorsky S-43B flying boat (registration NC16932) loses power in its left engine at an altitude of 1,600 feet (490 meters) while on approach for a landing at Kingston, Jamaica, and its crew switches its fuel selector, the aircraft loses speed, stalls, crashes into the Caribbean Sea, and sinks. All 18 people on board survive.
- April 29 – In the largest air battle of the Second Sino-Japanese War to date, 18 Mitsubishi G3M bombers and approximately 30 Mitsubishi A5M fighters encounter 60 to 80 Soviet-built Nationalist Chinese fighters over Hankou. The Japanese claim the destruction of 51 Chinese fighters and admit losing two fighters and two bombers, while the Chinese admit the loss of 12 aircraft and claim to have shot down anywhere from 21 Japanese aircraft to as many as 45.
- April 30 – Ala Littoria Flight 422, a Savoia-Marchetti S.73 (registration I-MEDA) flying from Tirana, Albania, to Rome, Italy, crashes into a mountainside near Maranola, Formia, Italy, killing all 19 people on board.

=== May ===
- For the second time in six months, a Mitsubishi A5M fighter loses a third of its right wing in when it is rammed by a Nationalist Chinese fighter but flies 200 miles (320 km) to its base without further incident. This time, the collision occurs over Hankou.
- A terror bombing raid by Imperial Japanese Navy Mitsubishi G3M bombers on Canton, China, kills 600 and injures 900.
- May 12
  - Three United States Army Air Corps B-17 Flying Fortresses use dead reckoning navigation to intercept the ocean liner SS Rex more than 600 nautical miles (1,100 km; 690 mi) at sea.
  - The United States Navy commissions its sixth aircraft carrier, USS Enterprise (CV-6).
- May 13–15 – A Japanese Gasuden Koken aircraft flying a three-cornered closed-circuit course over Japan breaks the nonstop unrefueled world distance record, flying 11,651 kilometers (7,240 miles).
- May 16 – A brand-new Northwest Airlines Lockheed Model 14 Super Electra airliner (registration NC17394) on its delivery flight from Burbank Airport in Burbank, California, to Saint Paul, Minnesota, with a planned stop at Las Vegas, Nevada, strikes a series of ridges in Mint Canyon in foggy conditions and disintegrates before coming to rest and burning on Stroh Peak near Saugus, California, at an altitude of 3,300 feet (1,000 meters), killing all nine people on board.
- May 17 – The United States Congress passes the Naval Expansion Act, leading to the construction of the Essex-class aircraft carriers.
- May 19
  - During the Second Sino-Japanese War, two unescorted Republic of China Air Force Martin 139WC bombers led by Captain Hsu Huan-sheng conduct history's first air raid against the Japanese Home Islands. The nighttime raid drops no bombs, but the bombers do drop two million propaganda leaflets "alerting the conscience of the Japanese people against atrocities committed by the Japanese invasion and occupation of China" over Nagasaki, Fukuoka, Kurume, Saga, and other cities. They also reconnoiter airbases, ports, warships, and factories.
  - An American Airways flight piloted by Don Keith Sheets and originating in Santiago, Chile, crashes during a trip north to Antofagasta, Chile. The wreckage is not sighted until May 15, 1940.
- May 22 – The Syndicato Condor Junkers Ju 52/3mge Guaracy (registration PP-CBC) crashes into the sea just after takeoff from Santos Airport in Santos, São Paulo, Brazil, killing six of the 17 people on board. Brazilian Minister of Justice Mauricio Cardoso is among the dead.
- May 24 – A fire breaks out in the right engine of United Airlines Trip 9, a Douglas DST-A-207A flying from Newark, New Jersey, to Cleveland, Ohio. The pilot attempts a forced landing on the side of a hill near Parkman, Ohio, but the airliner crashes, killing all 10 people on board.

=== June ===
- A prototype Heinkel He 118 makes the first airborne tests of a turbojet engine.
- June 2 – Nationalist aircraft bomb Granollers, Spain, a town without military significance, killing about 100 people. Most of the dead are women and children.
- June 4 - S. T. Lowe wins Hatfield to Isle of Man air race flying a Gypsy Comper with a time of 2 hours 55 minutes 28 seconds, the fastest time of 16 international entrants of whom notable entrants were C. W. A. Scott and Giles Guthrie who came in 5th place.
- June 9 – The Nicaraguan Air Force is formed as the Fuerza Aérea de la Guarda Nacional
- June 15 – Nationalist aircraft sink the Republican gunboat Laya at Valencia, Spain.
- mid-June – Nationalist aircraft have attacked 22 British-registered merchant ships in Spanish harbors or nearby waters since mid-April. Eleven of them have been sunk or badly damaged, and 21 British merchant mariners and several Non-Intervention Committee observers have died in the attacks.
- June 20 – Karl Bode breaks the world straight-line distance record for helicopters, flying a Focke-Wulf Fw 61 helicopter 230.348 kilometers (143.132 miles).
- June 23 – President Franklin D. Roosevelt sign the Civil Aeronautics Act into law. It abolishes the United States Department of Commerce's Bureau of Air Commerce, which previously had authority over civil aviation safety, and creates a new, independent Civil Aviation Authority with centralized authority to regulate the commercial and safety aspects of civil aviation in the United States.
- June 25 – The official public opening of Manchester Airport at Ringway, England, is held with an extensive air display.
- June 26 – The Deutsche Lufthansa Sucursal en Perú Junkers Ju 52/3mge Misti (registration OA-HHB) crashes into Cerro Chilligua near Chilligua, Peru, killing all seven people on board.

=== July ===
- In an Imperial Japanese Navy raid on a Nationalist Chinese airfield at Nanchang, three Japanese aircraft land on the field and their pilots disembark to shoot up Chinese personnel, barracks, and hangars and set Chinese aircraft on fire on foot before taking off and departing unscathed. The Japanese will use this attack technique on several future occasions.
- July 5 – 400 aircraft support a Spanish Nationalist offensive in Valencia.
- July 11 – Willy Messerschmitt purchases the controlling interest in his employer, Bayerische Fluzeugwerke (Bavarian Aircraft Works) of Augsburg, renaming it Messerschmitt AG after himself; aircraft from the previously abbreviated BFW firm retained their Bf prefixes from being flown before this date, those designs first flown after this date received the later Me prefix.
- July 14 – Howard Hughes flies a Lockheed 14N around the world in 3 days 19 hours, to and from Floyd Bennett Field New York, more than halving the time that Wiley Post took to make the trip.
- July 15 – A German Arado Ar 79 training and touring aircraft sets an international solo speed record over a 1,000-km (621.4-statute mile) course for an aircraft of its class, averaging 229.04 km/h (142.32 mph).
- July 17–18 – After filing a flight plan to fly nonstop from Floyd Bennett Field in Brooklyn, New York, west to California, Douglas Corrigan instead heads east after takeoff and makes a 28-hour 13-minute solo flight across the Atlantic Ocean to Ireland, claiming to have made a gross navigational error. He goes down in history as "Wrong Way" Corrigan.
- July 20–21 – The Short S.20 Mercury, flying as a component of the Short Mayo Composite aircraft combination, makes the world's first commercial heavier-than-air crossing of the North Atlantic Ocean, flying non-stop 4,667 km (2,900 mi) from Foynes, Ireland, to Montreal, Quebec, Canada, with a 454 kg (1,001 lb) payload. It then flies on to New York City, covering a total distance of 5,214 km (3,240 mi) in 22 hours 31 minutes of flying time.
- July 24 – Disaster strikes when a Colombian Air Force pilot performing an aerobatic display in a Curtiss Hawk II biplane fighter at a military review at Campo de Marte, Santa Ana, Usaquén, Colombia, disregards orders to remain above 500 feet (152 meters) and attempts to fly between the camp's presidential grandstand and diplomatic grandstand. His wingtop strikes the diplomatic grandstand, and his aircraft careens into the presidential grandstand, destroying part of its roof, before crashing into a crowd of spectators on the ground between the two grandstands, bursting into flames and sliding through them before coming to a stop upside down. An estimated 50 to 75 people are killed, and another 100 people – including future President of Colombia Misael Pastrana Borrero – are injured. Outgoing Colombian President Alfonso López Pumarejo and his successor Eduardo Santos are in the presidential grandstand but avoid injury.
- July 25 – The Battle of the Ebro begins in Spain with a Republican offensive. Although Nationalist bombers attack bridges over the Ebro, Nationalist fighters are still deployed in Valencia and Spanish Republican fighter pilots trained in the Soviet Union gain local air superiority flying improved versions of the Polikarpov I-15 and I-16.
- July 28
  - After physicians at the Mayo Clinic design a molded latex device with an attached rubber "lung" to provide oxygen for people on flights above 10,000 feet (3,000 m), Northwest Airlines pilot Mal Freeburg flies a Douglas DC-3 carrying the physicians, airline employees, and his wife, with all aboard using the new device. The test is a success, and the flight marks the first use of a modern American aviation oxygen mask.
  - The British Empire's Empire Air Mail Scheme, in which Imperial Airways carries all first-class mail by air, begins service to Australia, using a Qantas connection forward from Singapore; Short Empire flying boats are used throughout.
- July 29
  - The Pan American Airways Martin M-130 flying boat Hawaii Clipper disappears over the western Pacific Ocean 300 nautical miles (556 km; 345 mi) off the coast of the Philippine Islands in the vicinity of 12°27′00″N 130°40′00″E during a flight from Guam to Manila with 15 people on board. No trace of the aircraft or those on board ever is found. Pan American previously had flown 228 transpacific flights, logging nearly 15 million passenger miles, without serious incident.
  - Former Soviet Air Force commander-in-chief Yakov Alksnis is executed, a victim of the Great Purge.
  - An Arado Ar 79 sets an international solo speed record over a 2,000 km (1,200 mi) course for an aircraft of its class, averaging 227.029 km/h (141.069 mph).
- July 29-August 11 – During the Lake Khasan Incident along the border between the Soviet Union and Manchukuo, 70 fighters and 180 bombers of the Soviet Air Force conduct heavy strikes against Imperial Japanese Army positions.

=== August ===
- In an early experiment with heavier-than-air commercial aviation across the North Atlantic Ocean, a French Latécoère 521 flying boat flies from France to New York, New York, via Lisbon, Portugal, and the Azores.
- By the beginning of August, Nationalist fighters appear in sufficient numbers to establish Nationalist air superiority over the battlefield in the Battle of the Ebro. Inadequate Republican antiaircraft artillery, poor management of Republican fighters, the death of many Republican pilots, and the withdrawal of many of the best Soviet pilots from Spain all allow Nationalist aircraft to operate largely unchallenged. Up to 200 Nationalist aircraft circle over the battlefield as Nationalist forces begin a counteroffensive, shooting down many Republican fighters and dropping an average of 10,000 pounds (4,500 kg) of bombs per day into September. Small targets prove difficult for Nationalist aircraft to hit.
- August 2 – Bristol Aeroplane Company chief designer Frank Barnwell dies when the Barnwell B.S.W. – an airplane he designed and built privately – he is piloting stalls and crashes on takeoff from Bristol (Whitchurch) Airport in Bristol, England.
- August 10–11 – A Deutsche Luft Hansa Focke-Wulf Fw 200 (D-ACON Brandenberg) makes a non-stop flight from Berlin to New York, via Hamburg, Glasgow, Newfoundland, and Halifax, Nova Scotia, taking 24 hours 36 minutes for the trip.
- Mid-August – Général d'armée Joseph Vuillemin, the Chief of Staff of the French Air Force witnesses a display of the Luftwaffe's capabilities during a visit to Germany, He returns to Paris and warns that the Luftwaffe could defeat the French Air Force in at most two weeks.
- August 23 – Frank Hawks, a holder of numerous intercity flight speed records, and his passenger J. Hazard Campbell die when the Gwinn Aircar Hawks is piloting strikes overhead telephone wires and crashes just after takeoff from a field in East Aurora, New York.
- August 24 – Kweilin Incident: A China National Aviation Corporation DC-2 (the Kweilin) is strafed by Japanese aircraft in China after it makes an emergency landing in a bid to escape them, the first civilian airliner in history to be attacked by hostile aircraft. The 18 passengers and the crew are Chinese; the pilot is American.

=== September ===
- September 7 – A mass flight of 17 U.S. Navy aircraft makes a 2,570-statute mile (4,138 km) nonstop flight from San Diego, California, to Hawaii in 17 hours 21 minutes.
- September 10 – Germany prohibits all foreign air traffic in its airspace except along specific air corridors.
- September 15 – The United States Army Air Corps officially activates Hickam Field in the Territory of Hawaii.
- September 21 – Major General Oscar Westover, Chief of the U.S. Army Air Corps, is killed at Burbank, California, in the crash of a Northrop A-17AS he is piloting.
- September 24–25 – Three Soviet women - Valentina Grizodubova, Polina Osipenko, and Marina Raskova - fly the Tupolev ANT-37 Rodina ("Motherland") nonstop across the Soviet Union, achieving a women's world nonstop distance record of 5,913 km (3,672 statute miles) in 26 hours 29 minutes.
- September 30 – A senior French general tells the British military attaché in Paris that in the event of a war with Germany "French cities would be laid in ruins ... They had no means of defense," and adds that France was paying the price for having neglected the French Air Force for years.

=== October ===
- No. 800 Squadron, Fleet Air Arm, becomes the first operational Royal Navy squadron equipped with monoplanes when it takes delivery of Blackburn Skuas.
- Since it began operation in July 1929, the United States Department of Commerce's teletype aviation weather communications system has expanded to a total of 21,790 miles (18,935 nmi; 35,068 km) and includes 45 of the 48 U.S. states, excluding only Maine, New Hampshire, and South Dakota.
- October 9 – Nationalist aircraft sink the Republican submarine C-6 at Barcelona, Spain.
- October 22 – Lieutenant Colonel Mario Pezzi of Italy sets a world altitude record of 17,083 meters (56,047 feet) in a Caproni Ca.161bis. This record still stands for piston-engined aircraft.
- October 25
  - The Australian National Airways Douglas DC-2 Kyeema (VH-UYC) crashes on Mount Dandenong, in the Dandenong Ranges in Victoria, Australia, killing all 18 people on board. Among the dead is the Australian politician Charles Hawker.
  - General Maurice Gamelin, France's Chief of Staff of National Defense, puts before Prime Minister of France Édouard Daladier an assessment stating that Germany has 5,000 aircraft and France only 500, that the British Royal Air Force and French Air Force combined cannot match the German Luftwaffe, and that France cannot hope for even minimal security against German air attack before 1940 unless it embarks on a large, new aircraft procurement program.
- October 28 – Lieutenant Colonel Ramón Franco, a Spanish aviation pioneer, brother of future Spanish dictator Francisco Franco, and the commander of Spanish Nationalist air forces in the Balearic Islands, dies along with the other three members of his crew when his CANT Z.506 Airone ("Heron") seaplane crashes off Pollença, Mallorca, in a storm during an attempt to bomb Republican-held Valencia.
- October 30 – Another Nationalist counteroffensive begins in the Battle of the Ebro, preceded by a three-hour bombardment of Republican positions by artillery and over 100 Nationalist aircraft.

=== November ===
- November 4 – The Jersey Airways de Havilland DH.86 airliner St. Catherine's Bay (registry G-ACZN) crashes in Saint Brélade parish on Jersey in the Channel Islands just after takeoff from Jersey Airport, killing all 14 people on board and one person on the ground. Among the dead are the daughter, son-in-law, and baby granddaughter of surveyor and aerial archaeology pioneer G. A. Beazeley. It is the deadliest aviation accident involving a fixed-wing aircraft on British territory at the time.
- November 5–7 – A pair of Royal Air Force Long Range Development Unit Vickers Wellesleys makes a non-stop flight from Egypt to Darwin, Australia, setting a new world unrefueled point-to-point distance record of 7,158 miles (11,520 km). The nonstop distance flown is exceeded only by the closed-circuit record of 11,651 kilometers (7,240 miles) set by a Japanese airplane in May.
- November 14 – The Government of Australia separates the Civil Aviation Branch from the Department of Defence and reforms it as a separate government department, the Department of Civil Aviation, which serves as Australia′s national civil aviation authority.
- November 16 – Aircraft carrier HMS Ark Royal (91) (launched by Cammell Laird in Birkenhead in 1937 under the 1934 build plan) is commissioned into the British Royal Navy; she is the world's first carrier with the hangars and flight deck as an integral part of the hull and with deck armor.
- November 18 – The Battle of the Ebro ends with Spanish Nationalists retaking all territory captured by the Republicans. The Spanish Republican Air Force has lost between 150 and 170 aircraft since the battle began on July 25, and the Nationalists also have lost many planes.
- November 26 – France lays the keel of its second aircraft carrier, Joffre, intended as the first non-experimental French carrier. Joffre's construction will be abandoned in June 1940, and she will never be launched.
- November 28–30 – A Deutsche Luft Hansa Focke-Wulf Fw 200 makes the airline's first flight to Japan, flying non-stop from Berlin to Tokyo via Basra, Iraq; Karachi in British India; and Hanoi, French Indochina. The 14,228 km (8,841 mi) flight breaks the world distance record and takes 46 hours 18 minutes.

=== December ===
- National Aviation, the Spanish Nationalist air force, has 500 aircraft, enough to ensure it air superiority in the Spanish Civil War.
- December 5 – At a meeting of the French Permanent Committee on National Defense, Chief of Staff for National Defense General Maurice Gamelin advocates that France immediately order 1,000 military planes from the United States. The committee approves his proposal.
- December 8 – Deutsche Werke launches Germany's first aircraft carrier, Graf Zeppelin, at Kiel. She will never be completed.
- December 12 – The Nakajima Aircraft Company completes the prototype of the Imperial Japanese Army Air Force′s Nakajima Ki-43 (Allied reporting name "Oscar") fighter.
- December 15 – Piloting the prototype of the Polikarpov I-180 fighter on its first light, famed Soviet test pilot Valery Chkalov apparently miscalculates his landing approach and comes in short of the airfield and, when he attempts to correct his error, the engine stalls and the plane crashes into power lines. Chkalov is thrown from the cockpit ad dies of his injuries two hours later. The crash deals a blow to aircraft designer Nikolai Nikolaevich Polikarpov′s reputation with Josef Stalin and effectively ends his career.
- December 29–31 – A German Arado Ar 79 training and touring aircraft sets an international long-distance record for an aircraft of its class, flying 6,303 km (3,917 statute miles) from Benghazi, Libya, to Gaya, India, nonstop at an average speed of 160 km/h (99 mph).
- December 30 – The Italian Piaggio P.23R sets two new world records for payload and speed over distance, carrying a payload of 5,000 kg (11,000 lb) over a distance of 1,000 km (620 mi) and over a distance of 2,000 km (1,200 mi) at an average speed for each distance of 404 km/h (251 mph).

== First flights ==
- Aeronca 50 Chief
- Arado Ar 79
- Arado Ar 96
- Beriev MDR-5
- Cierva C.40
- Piaggio P.50-II
- Polikarpov I-152
- Late 1938 – Aichi E13A (Allied reporting name "Jake")

=== January ===
- Aichi D3A (Allied reporting name "Val")
- January 5 - Miles M.16 Mentor L4932
- January 18 – Farman F.223.01, prototype of the SNCAC NC.223
- January 21 - Potez-CAMS 141
- January 22 - Heinkel He 100
- January 24 - Armstrong Whitworth Ensign

=== February ===
- Polikarpov Ivanov
- February 2 - Junkers Ju 88 V4
- February 21 – Miles M.17 Monarch
- February 22 – Fleet 50J, prototype of the Fleet50K
- February 25 – Blohm & Voss BV 141

=== March ===
- March 1 – Vought XOS2U-1, prototype of the OS2U Kingfisher
- March 12 – PZL.44 Wicher

=== April ===
- April 6 – Bell XP-39, prototype of the Bell P-39 Airacobra, the first United States Army Air Corps fighter with tricycle landing gear
- April 20 – Tachikawa Ki-36 (Allied reporting name "Ida")

=== May ===
- May 11 – Polikarpov VIT-2
- May 21 - Dornier Do 26

=== June ===
- Teradako-ken TK-3
- June 7 - Boeing Model 314
- June 7 - Douglas DC-4E
- June 14 - Hawker Hotspur K8309
- June 20 - Potez-CAMS 160

=== July ===
- Focke-Wulf Fw 189
- July 17 - Koolhoven F.K.58
- July 26 - Potez 662

=== August ===
- Dornier Do 217
- PZL.46 Sum
- August 3 – Martin-Baker MB 2

=== September ===
- September 22 (probable date) – Miles M.15
- September 28 - Avia B.35
- September 29 - Supermarine Sea Otter

=== October ===
- October 2 – Dewoitine D.520-01, prototype of the Dewoitine D.520
- October 4 – Dornier Do 217
- October 11
  - Blohm & Voss BV 142
  - Curtiss CW-21
  - Westland Whirlwind prototype L6844
- October 14
  - Curtiss Model 75P, later redesignated XP-40, prototype of the Curtiss P-40
  - Saro A.33 K4773
- October 15 – Bristol Beaufort prototype L4441
- October 26 – Douglas Model 7B, prototype of the A-20 Havoc, Douglas DB-7, and Douglas Boston

=== November ===
- Saunders-Roe A.36 Lerwick
- November 23 – Dewoitine D.342

=== December ===
- December 4 – Miles M.18
- December 6 – K-2, first U.S. Navy K-class blimp
- December 10 – Lockheed Hudson
- December 15 – Polikarpov I=180
- December 12 – Fairey Albacore prototype L7074
- December 22
  - De Havilland Flamingo
  - Seversky AP-4, predecessor of the Republic P-43 Lancer
- December 23 – Blackburn Roc prototype L3057
- December 28 – Blackburn Botha
- December 31 – Boeing 307 Stratoliner

== Entered service ==
- Arado Ar 79
- Beriev Be-2 with Soviet Naval Aviation
- Grumman F3F with the United States Navy
- Mitsubishi Ki-30 (Allied reporting name "Ann") with Imperial Japanese Army Air Force
- Watanabe E9W (Allied reporting name "Slim") with the Imperial Japanese Navy, first Japanese aircraft designed specifically for operation from a submarine
- Spring 1938 – Seversky P-35 with the United States Army Air Corps 1st Pursuit Group

=== January ===
- Kawanishi H6K (Allied reporting name "Mavis") with the Imperial Japanese Navy

=== April ===
- Northrop BT with United States Navy Bombing Squadron 5 (VB-5) aboard USS Yorktown (CV-5)
- Curtiss P-36 Hawk with United States Army Air Corps

=== May ===
- Potez 630 with the French Air Force

=== June ===
- Westland Lysander with No. 16 Squadron, Royal Air Force

=== July ===
- Armstrong Whitworth Ensign with Imperial Airways
- Junkers Ju 90 with Deutsche Luft Hansa

=== August ===
- Mitsubishi Ki-21 (Allied reporting name "Sally") with Imperial Japanese Army Air Force's 60th Group
- Potez 631 with the French Air Force
- Supermarine Spitfire with No. 19 Squadron RAF, based at RAF Duxford

=== September ===
- Handley Page Hampden with the Royal Air Force's No. 49 Squadron

=== October ===
- Vickers Wellington with No. 9 Squadron RAF
- Armstrong Whitworth Ensign with Imperial Airways

=== November ===
- Arado Ar 196
- Blackburn Skua with 800 Naval Air Squadron, Fleet Air Arm, Royal Navy

== Retirements ==
- Martin T4M by the United States Navy
- Saro A.21 Windhover by Jersey Airways
- Westland CL.20

=== April ===
- Avro Sea Tutor by the Royal Air Force Seaplane Training School

=== July ===
- Keystone PK-1, last operational variant of the Naval Aircraft Factory PN, by the United States Navy
