= Negidals =

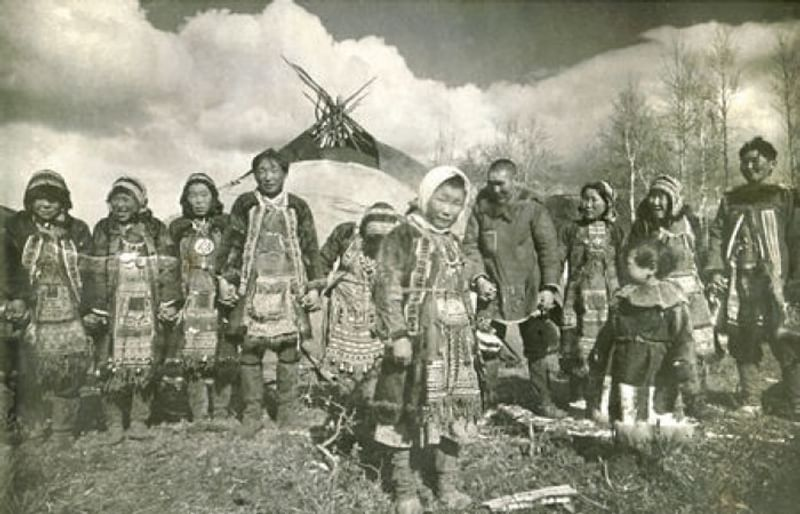
- Negidals in the upper reaches of the Amgun

Total population
- 533

Regions with significant populations
- Russia: Khabarovsk Krai: 481
- Ukraine: 52

Languages
- Negidal language

Religion
- Shamanism

Related ethnic groups
- Nanais, Ulchs

Negidals (Negidal: элькан бэйэнин, romanized: elkan bayenin, "local people"; Russian: негидальцы, negidaltsy) are an Indigenous ethnic group in the Khabarovsk Krai in Russia, who live along the Amgun River and Amur River.

The ethnonym "Negidal" is a Russian rendering of the Ewenki term ngegida, which means "coastal people".

== Distribution ==
Negidals are an indigenous ethnic group inhabiting the lower reaches of Amgun River (formerly also living in the Amur River region) in Priamurye, Russian Far East. Nowadays, the majority of Negidals live in Ulchskiy District and, to a lesser extent, in Imeni Poliny Osipenko District (mostly in Vladimirovka village) in Khabarovsk Krai; a number of Negidal families also live in Nikolayevsky, Nanaisky and other districts.

Settlement of Negidals in the Far Eastern Federal District by urban and rural settlements in %, 2010 census

Negidals have been a small indigenous community in the Russian Far East since the first population censuses, as demonstrated by the Negidal Population Table. A major drawback of most censuses is the insufficient coverage of the Negidal population, in particular, the Soviet censuses listied Evenks and Orochs as Negidals in certain cases:

Year	Population
1897	423
1926	426
1959	350
1970	537
1979	504
1989	622
2002	527

According to the 2002 census, there were 567 Negidals in Russia, 147 of whom still spoke the Negidal language. According to the 2010 census, there were 513 Negidals in Russia, 75 of whom still spoke the Negidal language.

After the fall of the USSR, according to the 2001 census, 52 Ukrainian citizens identified themselves as Negidals. Of these, 31 declared Negidal as their native language, 11 are Russian-speaking and for 9 the mother tongue is another language.

== Language and subgroups ==
The Negidal language belongs to the Tungusic language family and is closely related to the Evenki language.

Negidal alphabet was introduced in 2009 but is scarcely, if ever, used. The majority of Negidals living in Russia speak the Russian language.

Negidal has two dialects – Upper Negidal (Verkhovskoj) and the now seemingly extinct Lower Negidal (Nizovskoj); the dialectal division corresponds with the subethnic division into Lower and Upper Negidals, the two subgroups having local cultural, traditional, and linguistic differences.

The Negidal language is considered an endangered language; a 2017 study failed to find any active speakers of the Lower dialect, with only a few elderly people actively speaking Upper Negidal in Vladimirovka.

== Origin and history ==
Negidal people are considered to descend from Evenks that settled in the Amgun basin during the Iron Age. After branching off from the main Tungusic ethnic family and reaching the Okhotsk Coast, Negidals were geographically isolated.

The Amgun River served as a link connecting isolated Negidal settlements. Ancient Negidals who settled in this region relied primarily on fishing and kept their economic and cultural traditions. Although Negidals preserved traditional ties with the Evenks, they also began actively contacting autochthonous peoples such as Ulchs, Nanai and Nivkh, who consequently influenced Negidals' ethnogenesis, as well as their cultural and economic life, and to some extent, assimilated them.

From the middle of the second millennium until the nineteenth century, the Negidals, like other local groups, paid tribute to China and maintained trade relations with Manchu merchants.

Negidals first made contact with Russians in the early 17th century. As Russia expanded into the region, migrants from Russia and Ukraine began to actively settle in the Far East.

In the Soviet Union, Negidals had been affected by the collectivization. Particularly, in 1945, due to the merging of smaller kolkhozes, Negidals from Chukchagirskoye and Kamenka were resettled to Vladimirovka village.

== Religion ==
Negidals are officially considered Orthodox Christians but preserved their own animistic beliefs and shamanism.

== Traditional life and society ==
Traditionally, Negidals relied primarily on fishing and hunting. Upper Negidals also practiced reindeer herding (exclusively as a means of transport). Negidals fished in winter and summer and hunted marine mammals (primarily seals) using harpoons.

Both Upper and Lower Negidals employed dog sleds; and the Upper Negidals also rode reindeer sleds, occasionally sitting on the backs of reindeer. Boats and skis are two other traditional means of transportation. In the past, Negidals employed travois (called kelchi), usually for dragging large prey.

Negidals traditionally crafted clothing and footwear out of animal hides and fur and produced handmade household items (such as fur blankets or birch bark utensils). Negidal traditional garments consisted of clothing and footwear made out of fish and seal skin and dog hides. Traditional attire included robes (tetchennge, uykeli), leggings (heykii), different types of footwear (onta) and headwear (avun).

Negidal housing vary depending on the sub-ethnic group (Upper or Lower Negidals) and time of the year.

Traditionally, Upper Negidals lived in large movable chum tents, that were covered with reindeer hides in the winter. Lower Negidals, who were more settled, had winter lodgings—large carcass houses with a kang along one of the walls—while summer lodgings were small gable-roofed bark huts made from bark. Hunters built forest huts for temporary shelter.

Log cabins first began to be used by the Negidal people in the late 18th century. The flooring was made out of birch bark mats. A hut consisted of a hearth (later a stove borrowed from the Russians) and beds, covered with conifer branches and animal hides. These beds served as both tables and resting places. Tools and utensils were hung on the walls or placed in corners.

Negidals adapted farming from Russian settlers in the late 19th century; farming was actively introduced in Soviet kolkhozes, but after the fall of the Soviet Union, it remained mostly in the form of gardens.
