= Rodina flight =

1938 Soviet women's long-distance record flight

The crew of Rodina: Polina Osipenko, Valentina Grizodubova and Marina Raskova

The Rodina flight was a Soviet nonstop long-distance flight carried out on 24–25 September 1938 by Valentina Grizodubova, Polina Osipenko and Marina Raskova in the Tupolev ANT-37 Rodina (Russian: Родина, "Motherland"). The flight, from the Moscow area toward Komsomolsk-on-Amur in the Soviet Far East, established a women's world record for distance in a straight line without landing of 5,908.61 km (3,671.44 mi).

The flight lasted 26 hours and 29 minutes and covered approximately 6,450 km (4,010 mi) along its actual route. Bad weather, icing, loss of radio contact and navigational difficulties caused the aircraft to overshoot its intended destination. With fuel nearly exhausted, Grizodubova ordered Raskova, whose navigator's compartment was particularly vulnerable in a forced landing, to parachute into the taiga. Grizodubova and Osipenko subsequently made a wheels-up landing in swampy terrain near the Amgun River. Raskova spent about ten days alone in the taiga before rejoining the rest of the crew.

During the subsequent rescue operation, two aircraft carrying senior Soviet aviation officers collided near the landing site on 4 October, killing 15 people according to a subsequent Soviet Defense Commissariat investigation.

On 2 November 1938, Grizodubova, Osipenko and Raskova became the first women to receive the title Hero of the Soviet Union.

== Preparation and objective ==
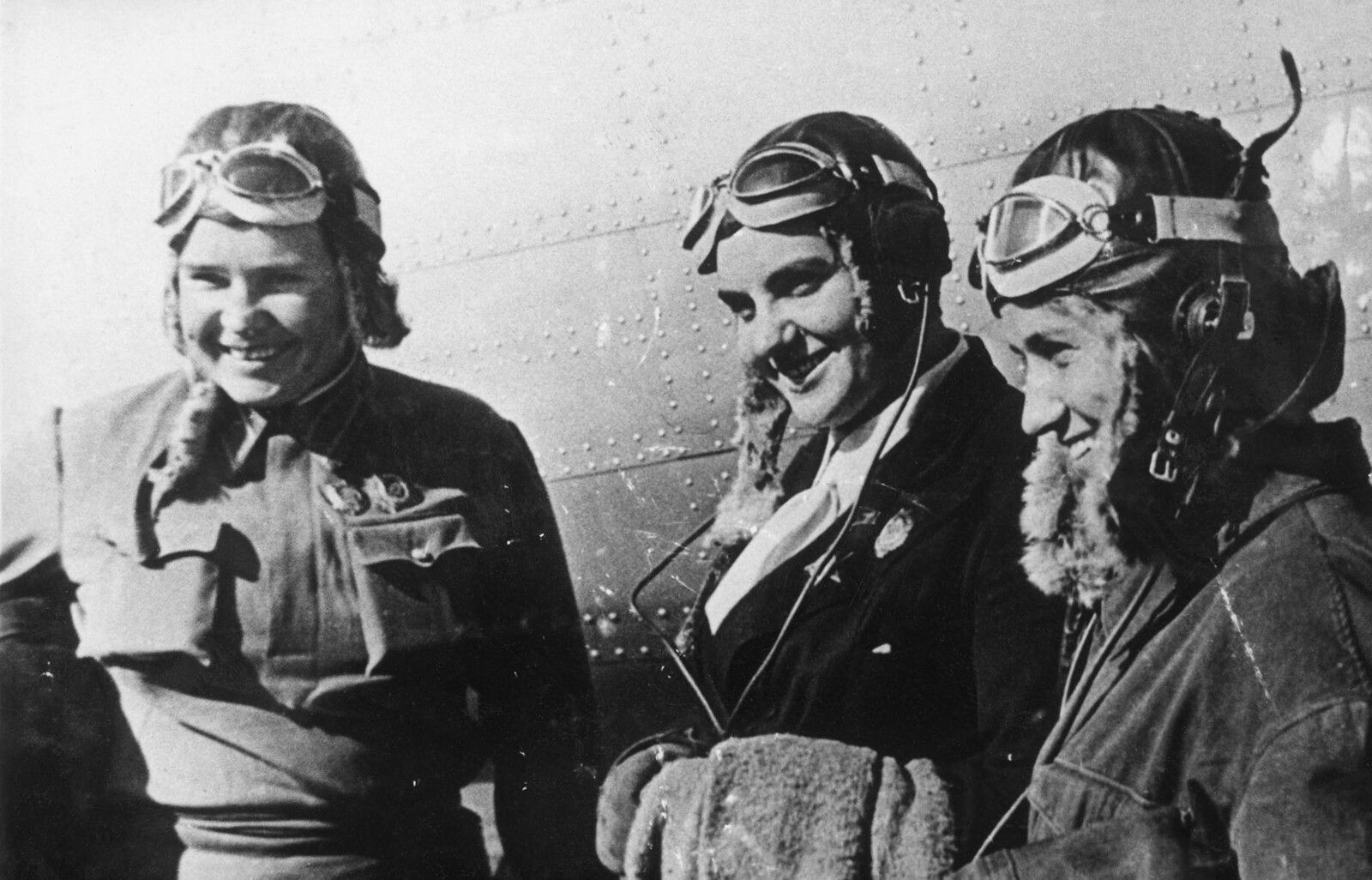
Osipenko, Grizodubova and Raskova

Planning for the record attempt began during the summer of 1938. Grizodubova proposed an all-female long-distance flight inspired by Valery Chkalov's transpolar flight. An initial proposal involved a flight toward the United States, but the approved route instead remained within Soviet territory, with Komsomolsk-on-Amur in the Far East as the intended destination.

The crew consisted of Grizodubova as commander and first pilot, Osipenko as co-pilot, and Raskova as navigator. All three already had experience with record flights. Earlier in 1938, Osipenko and Raskova had participated in other women's distance-record attempts.

Their aircraft was the third experimental DB-2 (factory designation 37-3), a long-range bomber prototype developed by a team headed by Pavel Sukhoi at the Tupolev Design Bureau. The DB-2 did not enter series production because its performance, apart from range, was inadequate for the bomber requirement. Its long range nevertheless made it suitable for distance-record attempts.

For the record attempt, the aircraft was modified: its armament was removed, more powerful M-86 engines were installed, fuel capacity was increased, and new navigation and radio equipment was fitted. At Grizodubova's suggestion, it was named Rodina, meaning "Motherland".

The departure was delayed after Raskova developed appendicitis during preparations. By the time she recovered, weather conditions in the Far East had deteriorated, but the flight was nevertheless authorized to proceed.

== Flight ==
Rodina departed the Moscow area on the morning of 24 September 1938. The FAI later recorded the course as beginning at Shchyolkovo airfield (listed as "Tchelcovo" in the FAI record) and ending near the Amgun River.

The aircraft encountered extensive cloud cover, icing and worsening weather as it flew east. Radio contact became unreliable after the crew crossed the Ural Mountains and was eventually lost when the radio equipment failed. Navigation became increasingly difficult as icing obscured the navigator's glazing. Raskova later wrote that she opened the astronomical hatch to obtain a celestial position. Grizodubova recalled that the flight charts were blown from the navigator's compartment after a window was opened while Raskova was dealing with the icing; accounts differ on the precise sequence of events. With radio navigation unavailable and wind drift difficult to determine, the crew continued east largely by magnetic compass through cloud.

On the morning of 25 September, breaks in the cloud revealed Tugur Bay in the Sea of Okhotsk, near the Shantar Islands. The crew had therefore passed north of its intended approach to Komsomolsk-on-Amur. Grizodubova turned the aircraft back toward the mainland. Soon afterward, the low-fuel warning illuminated, indicating that approximately half an hour of fuel remained.

== Forced landing ==
With insufficient fuel to reach an airfield, Grizodubova decided to make a forced landing in the taiga. The ANT-37's navigator occupied a separate glazed compartment in the nose of the aircraft. The compartment's position made it particularly dangerous in a wheels-up landing, so Grizodubova ordered Raskova to leave the aircraft by parachute before the landing.

Raskova parachuted into the forest while Grizodubova and Osipenko continued searching for suitable terrain. They eventually selected swampy ground near the upper reaches of the Amgun River and landed with the undercarriage retracted. The aircraft was only lightly damaged in the landing.

Grizodubova and Osipenko remained with the aircraft. Raskova, however, had landed some distance away. In the haste of leaving the aircraft she had not taken her emergency kit; according to later accounts, the principal food she carried was two bars of chocolate.

== Search and survival ==
Because radio communication with Rodina had been lost long before the forced landing, Soviet authorities did not know the aircraft's position. An extensive aerial and ground search was organized across the Soviet Far East and continued for eight days.

Grizodubova and Osipenko remained near the aircraft, while Raskova attempted to make her way back through the taiga after parachuting some distance away. She spent about ten days alone with little food, foraging for berries and drinking water or melted snow as she searched for the landing site.

At 13:30 on 3 October, Civil Air Fleet pilot Mikhail Sakharov located Rodina from the air and observed two people signaling beside the aircraft. After making another pass to confirm the identification, he radioed the position to the search headquarters at Komsomolsk-on-Amur.

On 4 October, search aircraft established that Grizodubova and Osipenko were at Rodina, but that Raskova was still missing. At 09:30, a MP-1 flying boat located Raskova approximately 10 km (6.2 mi) from the aircraft in sparse, swampy forest. She signaled to the aircraft with a handkerchief and a fire, and food was dropped to her. At 10:00, a team of paratroopers were dropped near Rodina and reached Grizodubova and Osipenko.

Meanwhile, authorities organized a ground and river rescue effort, dispatching a motorboat from Kerbi and a party of workers and hunters from Duki toward the landing area. Additional aircraft, parachutists and rubber boats were prepared to support the evacuation. Contemporary reports stated that the planned evacuation route would take the crew from Rodina to the Amgun River and then downstream by boat toward Kerbi and Komsomolsk-on-Amur.

Raskova reached Rodina on 6 October, having used the activity of search aircraft overhead to help orient herself toward the site.

The difficult terrain prevented an immediate evacuation. The rescue party approaching by river was eventually forced to transfer to smaller craft where the Amgun became unnavigable. On 9 October, the three crew members and their escorts began the journey down the Amgun toward Komsomolsk-on-Amur.

They reached Komsomolsk-on-Amur on 12 October.

== Rescue aircraft collision ==
On 4 October, one day after Rodina had been located from the air, two aircraft operating near the landing site collided in flight. One was a Douglas DC-3 piloted by Nikolai Lesnikov and carrying Alexander Bryandinsky, a recently decorated Hero of the Soviet Union; the other was a Tupolev TB-3 carrying Yakov Sorokin, commander of the air forces of the 2nd Independent Red Banner Army. According to the subsequent Defense Commissariat investigation, 15 people were killed. A later reconstruction by aviation historian Nikolai Ignatiev gives a toll of 16.

The accident was later cited in People's Commissar for Defense Order No. 070 of 4 June 1939, which addressed the high rate of accidents in the Soviet Air Force. The order stated that Sorokin had flown to the Rodina landing site without authorization from central command and without operational need, since the crew had already been found. It concluded that his apparent purpose was to claim participation in the rescue, and said that Bryandinsky subsequently made a similar unauthorized flight for apparently the same reason. The order attributed the collision to indiscipline and negligence by the two senior officers, presenting the loss of 15 lives and two aircraft as an example of wider deficiencies in Soviet military aviation safety.

== Record and awards ==
The Fédération Aéronautique Internationale ratified the flight as a women's world record for distance in a straight line without landing in Class C powered aircraft. The officially recognized distance was 5,908.61 km (3,671.44 mi), from Shchyolkovo to the Amgun River.

Because the aircraft's actual route involved substantial deviations caused by weather and navigation problems, the total distance flown was approximately 6,450 km (4,010 mi). The flight lasted 26 hours and 29 minutes.

On 2 November 1938, Grizodubova, Osipenko and Raskova were awarded the title Hero of the Soviet Union for the flight, becoming the first women to receive the title.

== Legacy ==
1939 Soviet stamps commemorating Osipenko, Raskova and Grizodubova

The flight received extensive publicity in the Soviet Union. In March 1939, the Soviet postal service issued a three-stamp series commemorating the Moscow–Far East flight, with separate stamps depicting Osipenko, Raskova and Grizodubova.

After Osipenko was killed in a training accident in May 1939, the settlement of Kerbi, in the district where Rodina had landed, was renamed Imeni Poliny Osipenko by decree of the Presidium of the Supreme Soviet of the RSFSR. The district was renamed in her honor at the same time. A monument dedicated to the crew was unveiled in the district center on 24 September 1971. The composition includes a 10 m (33 ft) aircraft wing and a panel bearing relief portraits of Grizodubova, Osipenko and Raskova.

In Komsomolsk-on-Amur, the building in which the three crew members stayed after their rescue bears a large relief memorial plaque depicting the aviators and Rodina. The building is listed as a cultural-heritage monument.

In 1998, for the 60th anniversary of the flight, the Russian women's aviation organization Aviatrisa and American women pilots organized the commemorative Russian-American flight A Bridge of Wings. An Antonov An-2 and a Maule M-5 followed a route from Moscow toward the Soviet Far East, reaching the village of Polina Osipenko in August.

The forced-landing site has remained the focus of commemorative visits and expeditions. It is designated a regional cultural-heritage site under the name "Landing site of the aircraft Rodina". In 2024 the Khabarovsk Krai heritage authorities formally established the boundaries and land-use regime of the protected site; the protected territory covers approximately 260,000 m^{2} (26 ha; 64 acres).
