= Lake Chukchagir =

Lake of Khabarovsk Krai

- Dytigna-Khevan
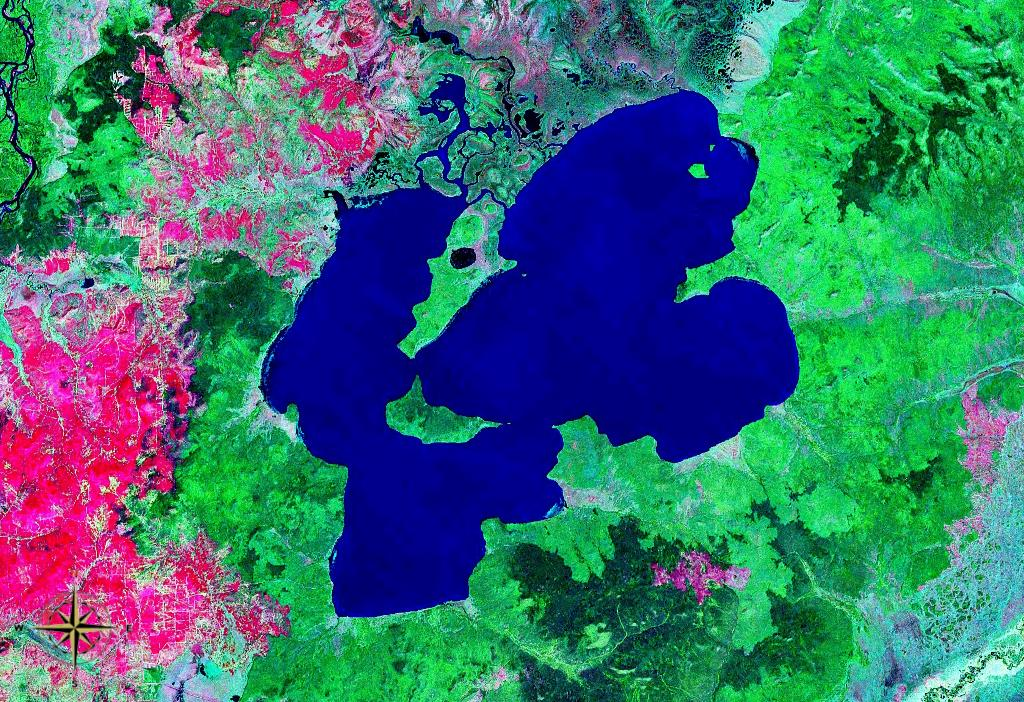
- View from space (false color)

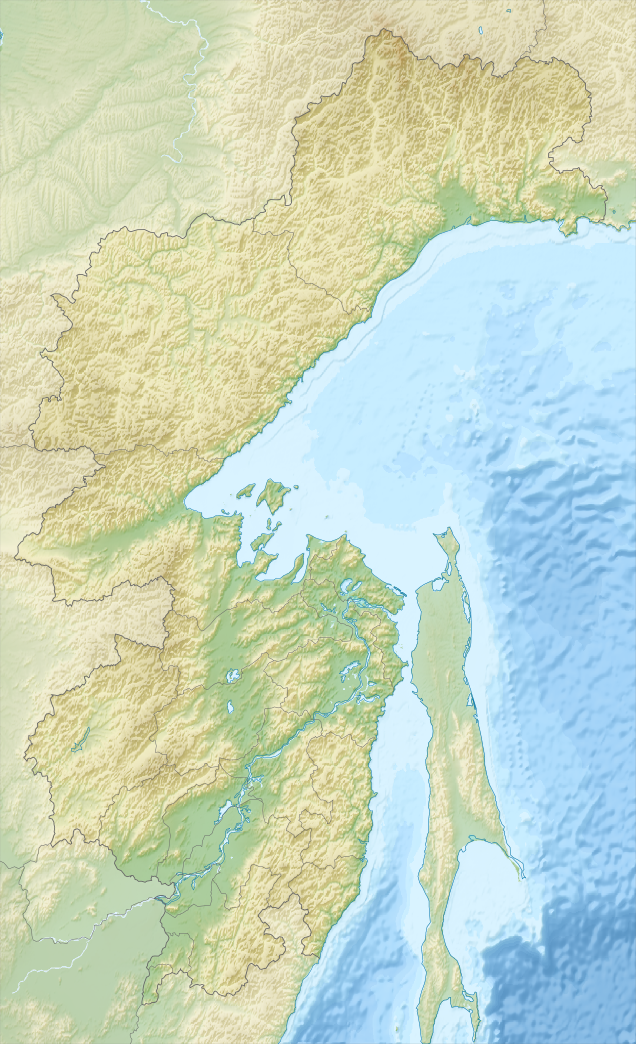
- Location in Khabarovsk Krai, Russian Far East
- Location: Khabarovsk Krai
- Coordinates: 52°N 136.6°E
- Type: Thaw lake of tectonic origin
- Primary inflows: Small streams
- Primary outflows: Oldzhikan
- Catchment area: 1,060 km^{2} (410 sq mi)
- Basin countries: Russia
- Max. length: 31 km (19 mi)
- Max. width: 22 km (14 mi)
- Surface area: 366 km^{2} (141 sq mi)
- Average depth: 2 m (6.6 ft)
- Max. depth: 6 m (20 ft)
- Surface elevation: 70 m (230 ft)
- Islands: 2

Lake Chukchagir (Russian: Чукчагирское озеро; Nanai: Дятигна-Хэван, Dytigna-Khevan) is a large freshwater lake in Khabarovsk Krai, Russia. It has an area of 366 km^{2} (141 sq mi) and a maximum depth of 6 m (20 ft). There are no permanent settlements on the shores of the lake.

== Geography ==
The lake is located in the Nimelen-Chukchagir lowland, Imeni Poliny Osipenko District, part of the basin of river Amgun and its tributary Nimelen. The Amgun flows to the west of the lake and beyond it rises the Dusse-Alin. Godbanki and Dzhalu are two large islands in the lake. Godbanki, the largest, is almost attached to the mainland in the northern shore, separated from it by a narrow sound. The inflow of the lake are 48 small streams or rivulets. Strongly meandering river Oldzhikan (Holgin), a right tributary of the Amgun, is the outflow of the lake.

There are peat bogs and residual thermokarst lakes in the lake area. In years of heavy rainfall, the level of neighboring Amgun river may rise and overflow its banks, reaching lake Chukchagir. The lake freezes between late October and early November, staying under ice until May.

== Fauna and flora ==
The banks of the lake are wooded and about two thirds of the shoreline is swampy, especially in the northern and northwestern part.

Lake Chukchagirskoe is rich in fish. Lenok, chebak, pike, catfish and crucian carp are among the fish species found in the waters of the lake. Salmon may enter from neighboring river Amgun.

== See also ==
- List of lakes of Russia
