= Imeni Poliny Osipenko (rural locality) =

imeni Poliny Osipenko имени Полины Осипенко
- Selo
- Interactive map of imeni Poliny Osipenko
- Location of imeni Poliny Osipenko imeni Poliny Osipenko (Khabarovsk Krai)
- Coordinates: 52°25′N 136°30′E
- Country: Russia
- Federal subject: Khabarovsk Krai
- Administrative district: imeni Poliny Osipenko District
- Founded: 1870
- Elevation: 73 m (240 ft)

Population (2010 Census)
  - Total: 2,252
  - Estimate (2023): 1,817 (−19.3%)

Administrative status
  - Capital of: imeni Poliny Osipenko District
- Time zone: UTC+10 (MSK+7)
- Postal code: 682380
- OKTMO ID: 08637406101

Imeni Poliny Osipenko (Russian: и́мени Поли́ны Осипе́нко) is a rural locality (a selo) and the administrative center of imeni Poliny Osipenko District of Khabarovsk Krai, Russia. Population: 2,252 (2010 census); 2,554 (2002 census); 2,586 (1989 Soviet census).

== History ==
Originally known as Kerbi (Керби), it was renamed in 1939 after Polina Osipenko, a Soviet pilot who set the women's world aircraft distance record flying to this location from Moscow.

== Geography ==
It is located on the right bank of the Amgun River, near the confluence of the Nimelen.

== Climate ==
Imeni Poliny Osipenko has a humid continental climate (Köppen climate classification Dwb), closely bordering on a subarctic climate (Dwc) with dry, severely cold winters and warm, moist summers. As far as non-arid climates warmer than subarctic climates go, Imeni Poliny Osipenko is among the coldest. Its lower latitude and inland location enables four months to just exceed 10 °C (50 °F). Winters are far colder than even many polar climates in maritime areas.

Climate data for Imeni Poliny Osipenko (1991-2020, extremes 1911–present)
Month	Jan	Feb	Mar	Apr	May	Jun	Jul	Aug	Sep	Oct	Nov	Dec	Year
Record high °C (°F)	−0.7 (30.7)	4.4 (39.9)	19.4 (66.9)	27.0 (80.6)	34.7 (94.5)	36.2 (97.2)	39.3 (102.7)	36.9 (98.4)	31.3 (88.3)	24.4 (75.9)	12.0 (53.6)	0.4 (32.7)	39.3 (102.7)
Mean daily maximum °C (°F)	−18.2 (−0.8)	−12.6 (9.3)	−3.0 (26.6)	7.1 (44.8)	16.6 (61.9)	22.5 (72.5)	25.3 (77.5)	23.7 (74.7)	17.9 (64.2)	7.4 (45.3)	−6.8 (19.8)	−17.9 (−0.2)	5.2 (41.3)
Daily mean °C (°F)	−25.0 (−13.0)	−20.6 (−5.1)	−10.2 (13.6)	0.9 (33.6)	8.7 (47.7)	14.9 (58.8)	18.4 (65.1)	17.3 (63.1)	11.2 (52.2)	1.8 (35.2)	−12.3 (9.9)	−24.0 (−11.2)	−1.6 (29.2)
Mean daily minimum °C (°F)	−30.6 (−23.1)	−27.8 (−18.0)	−17.5 (0.5)	−4.7 (23.5)	2.6 (36.7)	8.8 (47.8)	13.1 (55.6)	12.5 (54.5)	6.0 (42.8)	−2.8 (27.0)	−17.2 (1.0)	−29.1 (−20.4)	−7.2 (19.0)
Record low °C (°F)	−51.5 (−60.7)	−49.9 (−57.8)	−40.6 (−41.1)	−30.0 (−22.0)	−8.4 (16.9)	−2.7 (27.1)	0.4 (32.7)	0.1 (32.2)	−9.0 (15.8)	−22.5 (−8.5)	−44.8 (−48.6)	−50.9 (−59.6)	−51.5 (−60.7)
Average precipitation mm (inches)	12 (0.5)	8 (0.3)	14 (0.6)	27 (1.1)	63 (2.5)	63 (2.5)	80 (3.1)	90 (3.5)	70 (2.8)	51 (2.0)	24 (0.9)	17 (0.7)	519 (20.5)
Average precipitation days (≥ 1.0 mm)	4	2	3	5	9	8	8	9	7	6	5	4	70
Average relative humidity (%)	76	72	67	64	66	73	79	81	79	73	76	78	74
Mean monthly sunshine hours	139.9	185.0	233.8	219.8	223.9	243.1	221.0	202.0	180.8	150.8	130.3	124.5	2,254.9
Source 1: Pogoda.ru.net
Source 2: NOAA

== Transportation ==
A local road leads west to Briakan and then to Beryozovy, which is on the Baikal-Amur Mainline.

The settlement is served by Imeni Poliny Osipenko Airport.
