= Diocese of Amur =

Diocese of Amur Амурская епархия
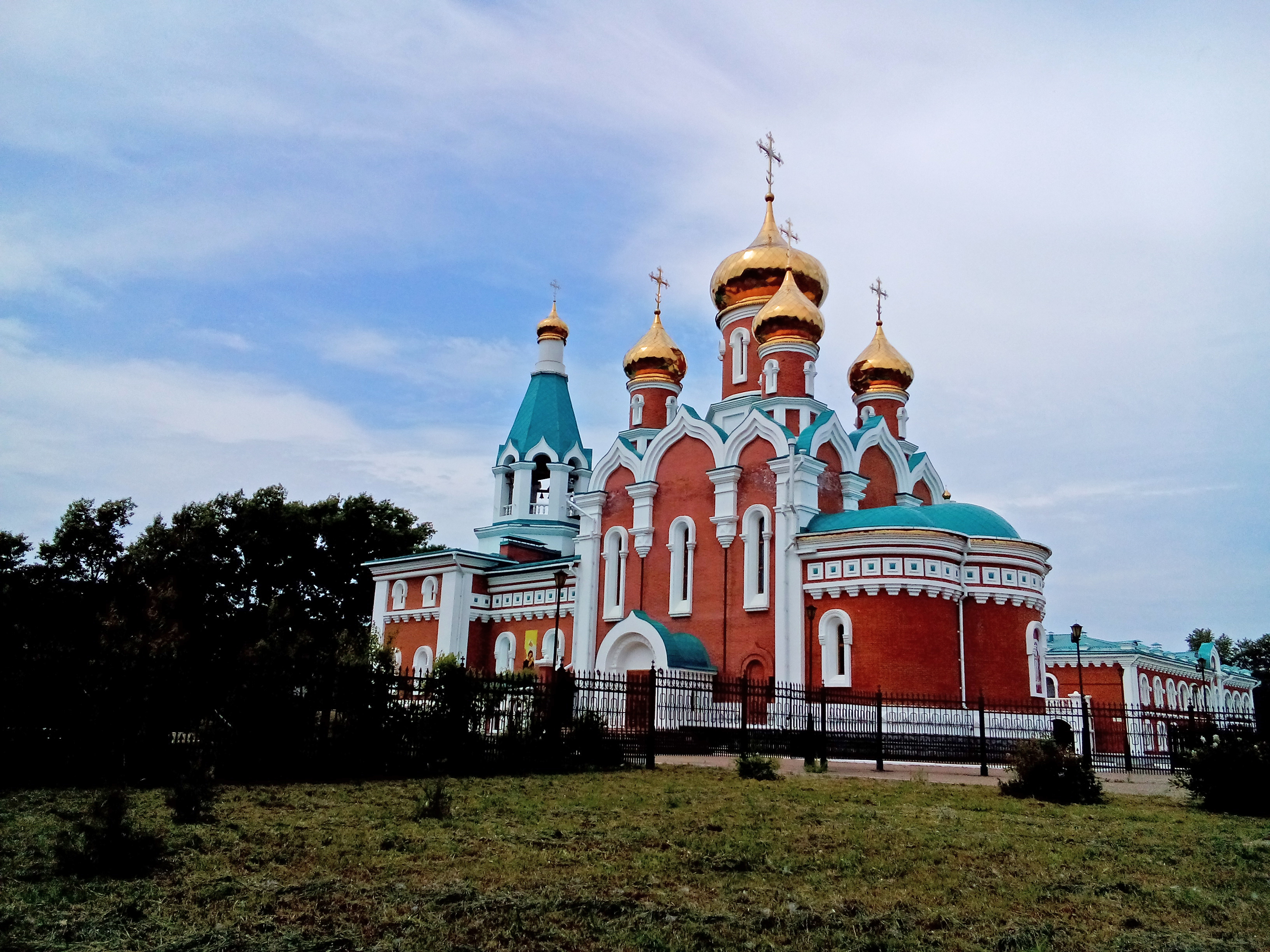

Location
- Deaneries: 3
- Headquarters: Komsomolsk-on-Amur

Information
- Denomination: Eastern Orthodox
- Sui iuris church: Russian Orthodox Church
- Established: October 5, 2011
- Cathedral: Saint Elijah Cathedral
- Language: Church Slavonic

Current leadership
- Governance: Eparchy
- Bishop: Nikolai (Ashimov) since January 29, 2012

Website
- eparhia-amur.ru

Diocese of Amur (Russian: Амурская епархия) is an eparchy of the Russian Orthodox Church, uniting parishes in the central part of the Khabarovsk Krai (within the boundaries of the Verkhnebureinsky, Komsomolsky, Osipenko and Solnechny districts). It is part of the Amur Metropolis. The diocese cathedral, Saint Elijah Cathedral is located in Komsomolsk-on-Amur.

== History ==
Established by the decision of the Holy Synod of the Russian Orthodox Church on October 5, 2011, on the territory of Vaninsky, Verkhnebureinsky, Komsomolsky, Osipenko, Solnechny and Ulchsky districts of the Khabarovsk Krai, separated from the Khabarovsk Diocese. The Synod decided to have the title "Amur and Chegdomyn" for the ruling bishop. At the same time, the diocese was included in the Amur Metropolis.

Hegumen Aristarchus (Yatsurin) was elected Bishop of Amur and Chegdomyn (he did not take part in the administration of the diocese).

By the decision of the Holy Synod of the Russian Orthodox Church on December 27, 2011, Hieromonk Nikolai (Ashimov), assistant vice-rector for educational work of the Moscow Theological Academy and Seminary, was elected administrator of the Amur diocese.

By the decision of the Holy Synod of October 21, 2016, the parishes of the Vanino and Ulch districts were transferred to the newly formed Vanino diocese.

== Bishop ==
- January 29, 2012 — present: Nikolay (Ashimov)

== Deaneries ==
As of December 2022:

- Verkhnebureinskoye Deanery (Verkhnebureinsky district)
- Komsomolsk Deanery (Komsomolsk-on-Amur city and Komsomolsk district)
- Solnechnoye Deanery (Solnechny District and Osipenko District)
- Missionary priest
