= 31st Guards Long-Range Aviation Regiment =

101st Transport Aviation Regiment (1942-1944) 31st Guards Long-Range Aviation Regiment (1944) 31st Krasnoselsky Guards Bomber Aviation Regiment (1944-1945)
- Active: 1942–1945
- Country: Soviet Union
- Branch: Soviet Air Force
- Engagements: Eastern Front of World War II
- Decorations: Guards designation Order of the Red Banner

Commanders
- Commander: Valentina Grizodubova (1942-1944); Stepan Zapylenov (1944-1945)

Aircraft flown
- Transport: Lisunov Li-2

The 31st Guards Long-Range Aviation Regiment, (originally named the 101st Transport Aviation Regiment before receiving the Guards designation) was a Soviet military aviation regiment subordinate to the 1st Transport Aviation Division. Equipped with Li-2 aircraft converted to drop cargo from the air with parachutes, the unit was originally given long-range transport tasks, such as delivering important cargo to partisan units on the frontlines. Initially the unit was commanded by Valentina Grizodubova, who had been previously awarded the title Hero of the Soviet Union for her record-setting Rodina flight, but after a serious disagreement with Marshal of Aviation Golovanov over lack of promotion and the unit not receiving the Guards designation at the time, she was removed from her command post and replaced by the deputy commander in May 1944. Later that year the unit was honored with the Guards designation, and eventually it became the 31st Krasnoselsky Guards Bomber Aviation Regiment (the honorific "Krasnoselsky" having been awarded for the unit's distinction in the battles for Krasnoe Selo).
