= 1938 Jersey Airport disaster =

Aviation incident in Jersey, Channel Islands

Coordinates: 49°12′33.22″N 2°10′44.57″W

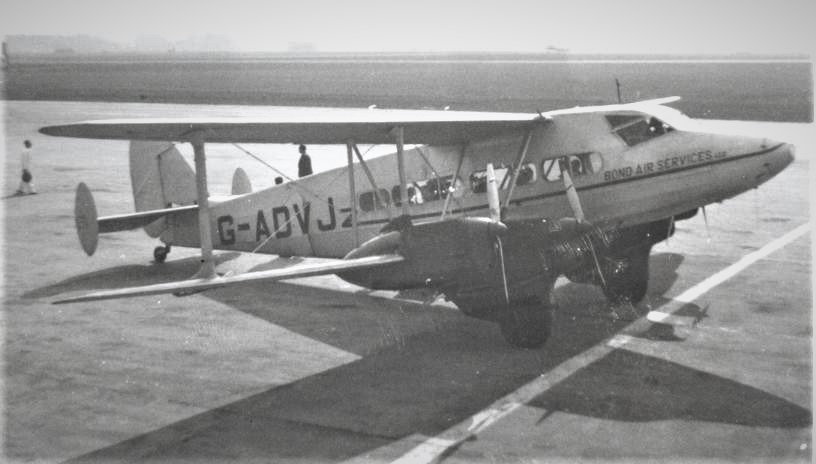
- A De Havilland DH.86, similar to the aircraft involved

Accident
- Date: 4 November 1938
- Summary: Pilot error
- Site: near Jersey Airport, Jersey

Aircraft
- Aircraft type: De Havilland D.H.86
- Aircraft name: St Catherine's Bay
- Operator: Jersey Airways
- Registration: G-ACZN
- Flight origin: Jersey Airport
- Destination: Southampton
- Passengers: 12
- Crew: 1
- Fatalities: 13
- Survivors: 0

Ground casualties
- Ground fatalities: 1

The 1938 Jersey Airport disaster occurred at 10:50am on Friday 4 November 1938 when the Jersey Airways de Havilland D.H.86 airliner St Catherine's Bay (G-ACZN) crashed in the parish of Saint Brelade, 500 yards east of Jersey Airport, killing the pilot and all twelve passengers on board, as well as farm hand Edmund Le Cornu, who was working on the ground. In terms of loss of life, it was the worst crash of a rigid aircraft on British territory to date and the second-worst overall crash of a British rigid aircraft after the crash of an Imperial Airways airliner in Belgium in 1933 (in which 15 people died).

The airliner had just taken off from Jersey en route to Southampton. The sky was overcast, with a cloud base of 120–150 feet. The aircraft had been fully inspected and was not carrying a full load.

The Air Ministry investigation concluded that the accident was due to pilot error. The pilot had made a climbing turn into the clouds and inadvertently allowed the aircraft to sideslip when he was still too close to the ground to avert disaster. The aircraft had exploded and several bodies had been thrown up to 40 feet away.

Among the dead were the daughter, son-in-law and baby granddaughter of surveyor and aerial archaeology pioneer G. A. Beazeley.
