= Marina Raskova =

Soviet aviator (1912–1943)

- Марина Раскова
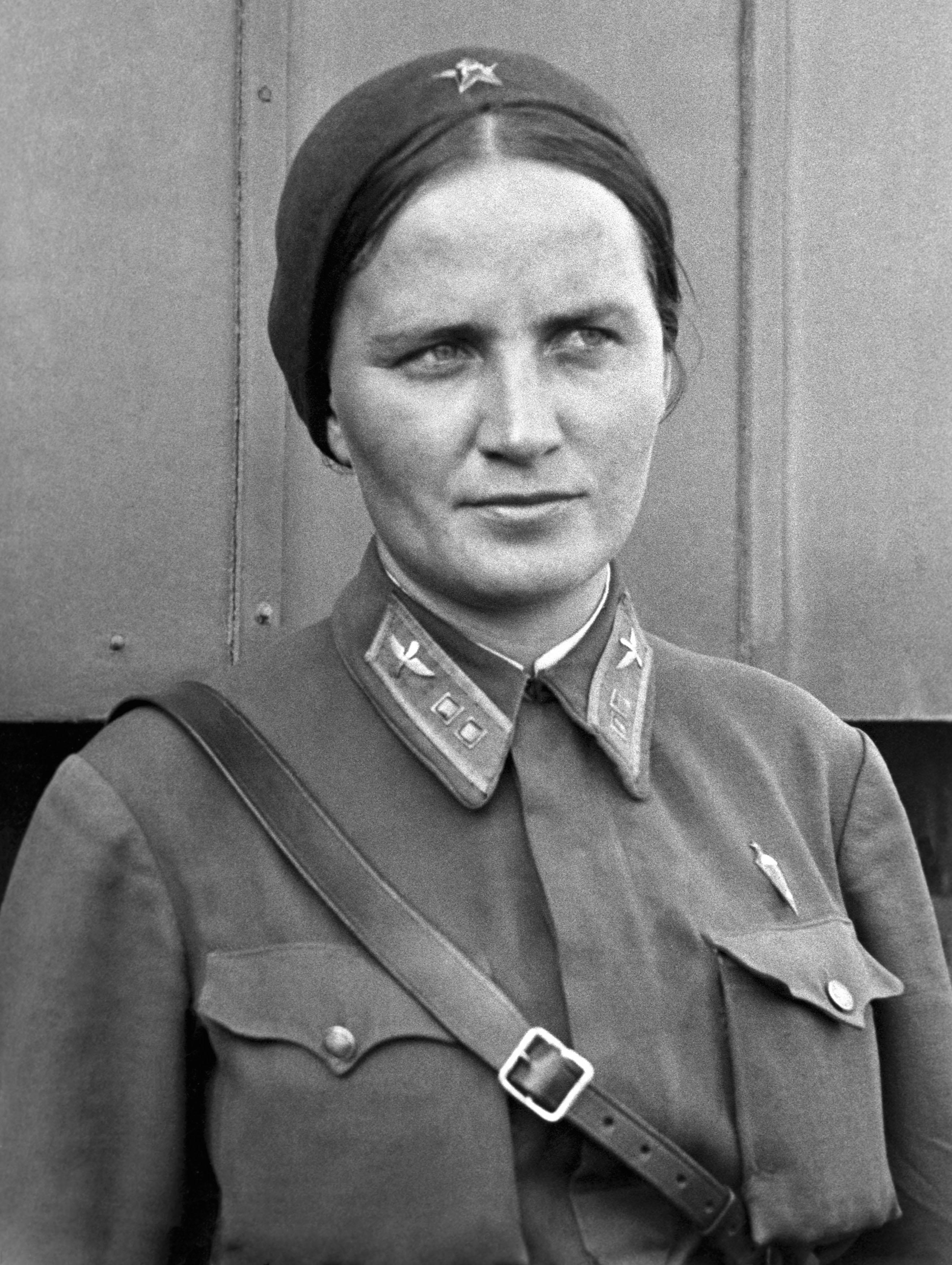
- Raskova in 1938
- Born: Марина Михайловна Малинина; March 28, 1912; Moscow, Russian Empire
- Died: January 4, 1943 (aged 30); Saratov Oblast, Russian SFSR, Soviet Union
- Resting place: Kremlin Wall Necropolis, Moscow
- Occupation: Navigator
- Known for: Founding three Soviet female air regiments
- Political party: Communist Party
- Spouse: Sergei Raskov (m. 1929–1935)
- Children: 1
- Military career
- Allegiance: Soviet Union
- Branch: Soviet Air Force
- Service years: 1941–1943
- Awards: Hero of the Soviet Union; Order of Lenin (2x); Order of the Patriotic War, 1st Class; Medal "For Battle Merit"; Honored Employee of the NKVD

Marina Mikhaylovna Raskova (Russian: Мари́на Миха́йловна Раско́ва, IPA: [mɐˈrʲinə mʲɪˈxajləvnə rɐˈskovə]; née Malinina; 28 March 1912 – 4 January 1943) was the first woman in the Soviet Union to achieve the diploma of professional air navigator. Raskova went from a young woman with aspirations of becoming an opera singer to a military instructor to the Soviet Union's first female navigator. She was the navigator to many record-setting as well as record-breaking flights and the founding and commanding officer of the 587th Bomber Aviation Regiment, a women's aviation regiment which was renamed the 125th M.M. Raskova Borisov Guards Dive Bomber Regiment in her honor. Raskova became one of over 800,000 women in the military service, founding three female air regiments, one of which eventually flew over 30,000 sorties in World War II and produced at least 30 Heroes of the Soviet Union.

== Early life ==
Marina Malinina was born to middle-class parents. Her father was operatic singer and singing instructor Mikhail Malinin (Михаил Дмитриевич Малинин) and her mother a teacher. Anna Lyubatovich, her mother's sister, was a known Russian singer as Tatyana Lyubatovich (Татьяна Спиридоновна Любатович). Her half-brother (through her father) was shipbuilding scientist Boris Malinin. Unlike the majority of Soviet airwomen, Marina did not show any early interest in aviation. Becoming a pilot-navigator was her second choice. Raskova had originally wanted to become a musician, and her goal was to become an opera singer.

In 1919, when she was seven, her father died from the injuries inflicted when he was struck by a motorcycle. She continued her drama and singing studies, but later she fell victim to a middle ear infection that left her unable to continue singing. She decided to quit music and to devote herself to studying chemistry and engineering in high school. After graduation in 1929, to help her family, she started work in a dye factory as a chemist. She married an engineer, Sergey Raskov, whom she met at the dye factory, so changing her name to Raskova. She had a child, Tanya, in 1930. The following year she started to work in the Aero Navigation Laboratory of the Air Force Academy as a draftswoman.

Raskova became a famous aviator as both a pilot and a navigator for the Soviet Union in the 1930s. She was the first woman to become a navigator in the Soviet Air Force in 1933. A year later, she started teaching at the Zhukovsky Air Academy, also a first for a woman. She taught military navigation to male and later, female students. She was the subject of skepticism by many of her male students but was able to prove herself capable. Later, the Academy sent Raskova to Tushino for the Central Flying Club in order to receive flying lessons, which she completed in August 1935. When Raskova's training ended, she was able to become an instrument flying instructor and was allowed to teach command personnel advanced navigation. In 1935, she divorced. She set a number of long-distance records, a significant achievement in the eyes of the Soviet Union, which gave its aviators celebrity status. Most of these record flights occurred in 1937 and 1938, while she was still teaching at the air academy. She was referred to as the "Russian Amelia Earhart" for her achievements.

The most famous of her long-distance records was the flight of the Rodina (Russian for "Motherland"), Ant-37 – a converted DB-2 long range bomber – on 24–25 September 1938. She was the navigator of the crew that also included Polina Osipenko and Valentina Grizodubova. From the start, the goal was to set an international women's record for a straight-line distance flight. The plan was to fly from Moscow to Komsomolsk (in the Far East). When finally completed, the flight took 26 hours and 29 minutes, over a straight-line distance of 5,947 km (3,695 mi) (total distance of 6,450 km (4,010 mi)). However, the ordeal took 10 days when the plane was unable to find an airfield due to poor visibility. Because the navigator's cockpit had no entrance to the rest of the plane and was vulnerable in a crash landing, Raskova parachuted out before they touched down. She had forgotten her emergency kit and was unable to find the plane for 10 days, with no water and almost no food. The rescue crew had found the aircraft eight days after the landing, and was waiting when she found her way to it, after which all three women were taken to safety. On 2 November 1938, all three women were decorated with the Hero of the Soviet Union award, the first women to ever receive it and the only ones before World War II.

== World War II ==
When World War II broke out, there were numerous women who had training as pilots and many immediately volunteered. While there were no formal restrictions on women serving in combat roles, their applications tended to be blocked, run into red tape, etc. for as long as possible in order to discourage the applicants from entering any training program. Raskova is credited with having used her personal connections with Joseph Stalin to convince the military to form three combat regiments of women. Following a speech by Raskova on 8 September 1941 calling for women pilots to be allowed to fight, Stalin on 8 October 1941 ordered the formation of the all-female 122nd Aviation Corps. Not only would the women be pilots, but also support staff and engineers. After their training, the Group's three regiments received their formal designations as follows:

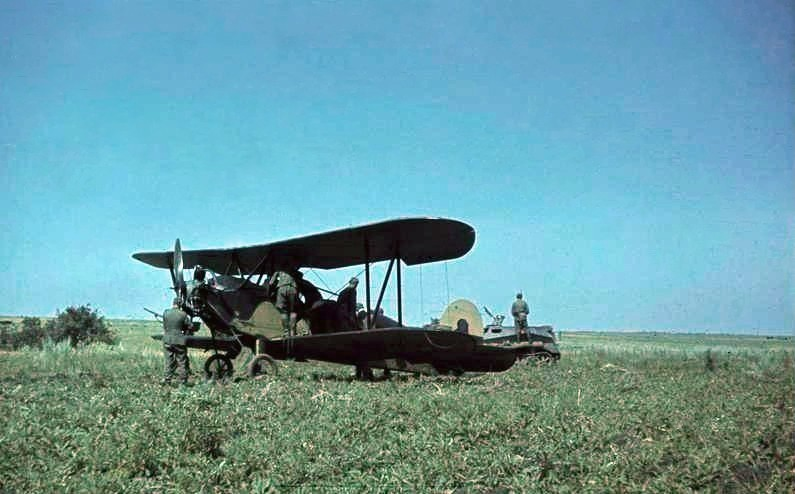
- A damaged and abandoned Po-2 forced to land in Ukrainian SSR and subsequently captured by German troops, 1941. On this type of aircraft, the Night Witches flew more than 24,000 sorties
  The 586th Fighter Aviation Regiment (586 IAP/PVO): This unit was the first to take part in combat (16 April 1942) of the three female regiments. Equipped with Yakovlev Yak-1, Yak-7B and Yak-9, it flew 4,419 flights. destroying 38 enemy aircraft in 125 air battles. Commanders were Tamara Kazarinova and later Aleksandr Gridnev.
- The 587th Bomber Aviation Regiment, (later renamed the 125th Guards Bomber Aviation Regiment): Raskova commanded this unit until her death in a flying accident, while leading two other Petlyakovs to their first operative airfield, near Stalingrad, whereupon the unit was given to Valentin Markov. It started service as the 587th Bomber Aviation Regiment until it was given the Guards designation in September 1943. The unit was given the very best of the Soviet bombers, the Petlyakov Pe-2, while many male units used obsolete aircraft, which resulted in much resentment. The unit flew 1,134 missions, dropping over 980 tons of bombs. It produced five Heroes of the Soviet Union.
- The 588th Night Bomber Aviation Regiment (later renamed the 46th Taman Guards Night Bomber Aviation Regiment, nicknamed the "Night Witches" (die Nachthexen) by the Germans): This was the best known of the regiments and was commanded by Yevdokia Bershanskaya. It originally began service as the 588th Night Bomber Regiment (588 NBAP), but was redesignated in February 1943 as recognition for service which tallied 24,000+ combat missions by the end of the war. The regiment produced 24 Heroes of the Soviet Union. Their aircraft was the Polikarpov Po-2, a very outdated biplane. They were the only one of the three regiments to remain solely female throughout the war, a distinction they went to some lengths to maintain.

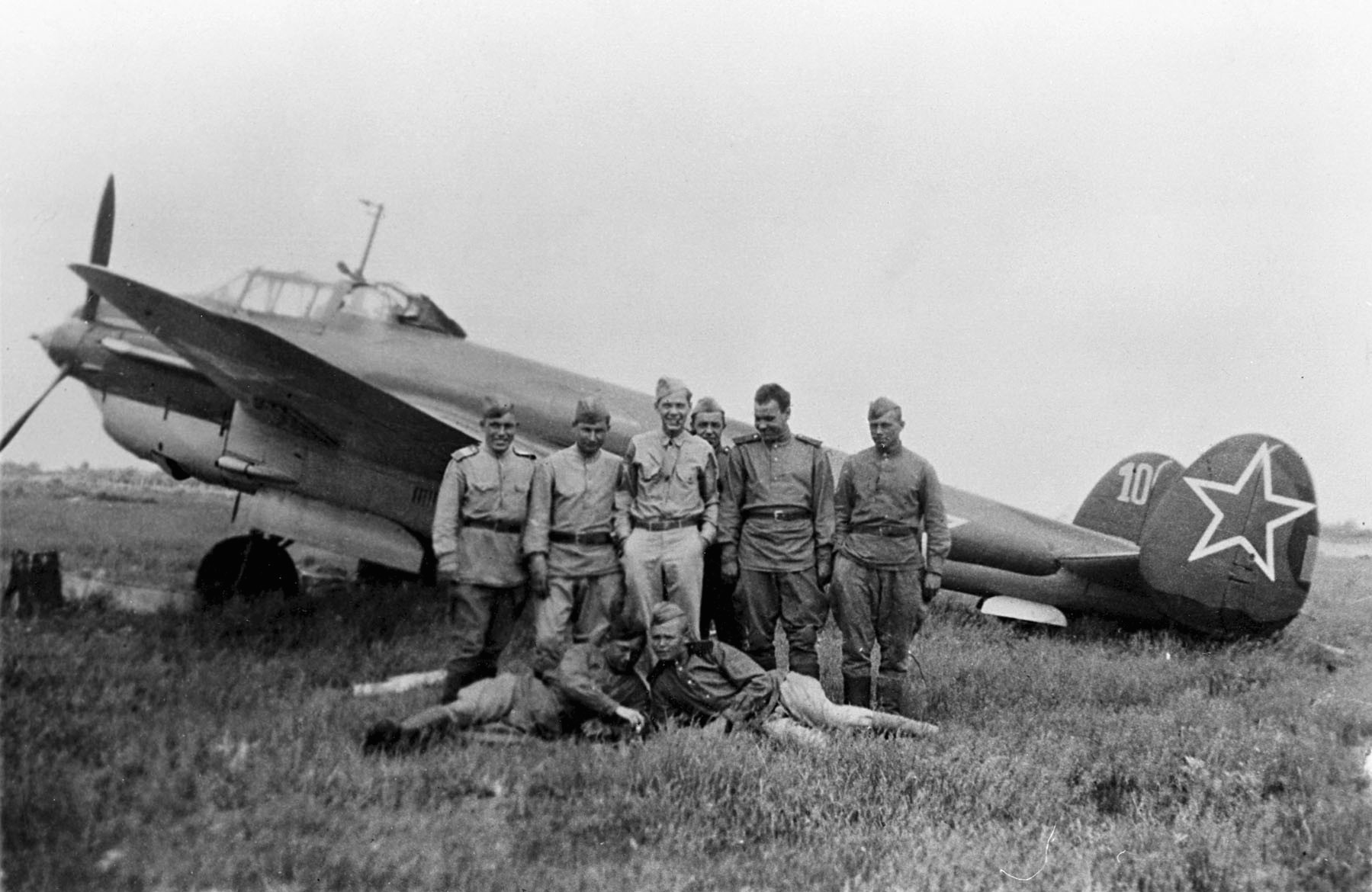
Russian pilots and ground crew pose in front of a Pe-2 dive bomber at Poltava, June 1944. Marina Raskova died while flying this type of aircraft in a flying accident, near Stalingrad

Raskova died on 4 January 1943, when her aircraft crashed attempting to make a forced landing on the Volga bank, while leading two other Pe-2s to the first operative airfield near Stalingrad. The entire crew perished. She received the first state funeral of the war.

== Legacy ==
Her ashes were buried in the Kremlin Wall Necropolis on Red Square, beside Polina Osipenko's. She was posthumously awarded the Order of the Patriotic War I Class. An American ship, Ironclad (launched as Mystic in April 1919), that had taken part in Convoy PQ 17 was transferred to Soviet ownership and renamed Marina Raskova in June 1943.

Streets were named after her in Moscow and Kazan, as well as a square in Moscow, some schools and Young Pioneer detachments. There was a bust of her at the "M. M. Raskova" Higher Military Aviation School of Pilots in Tambov, but that school ceased to function in 1997.

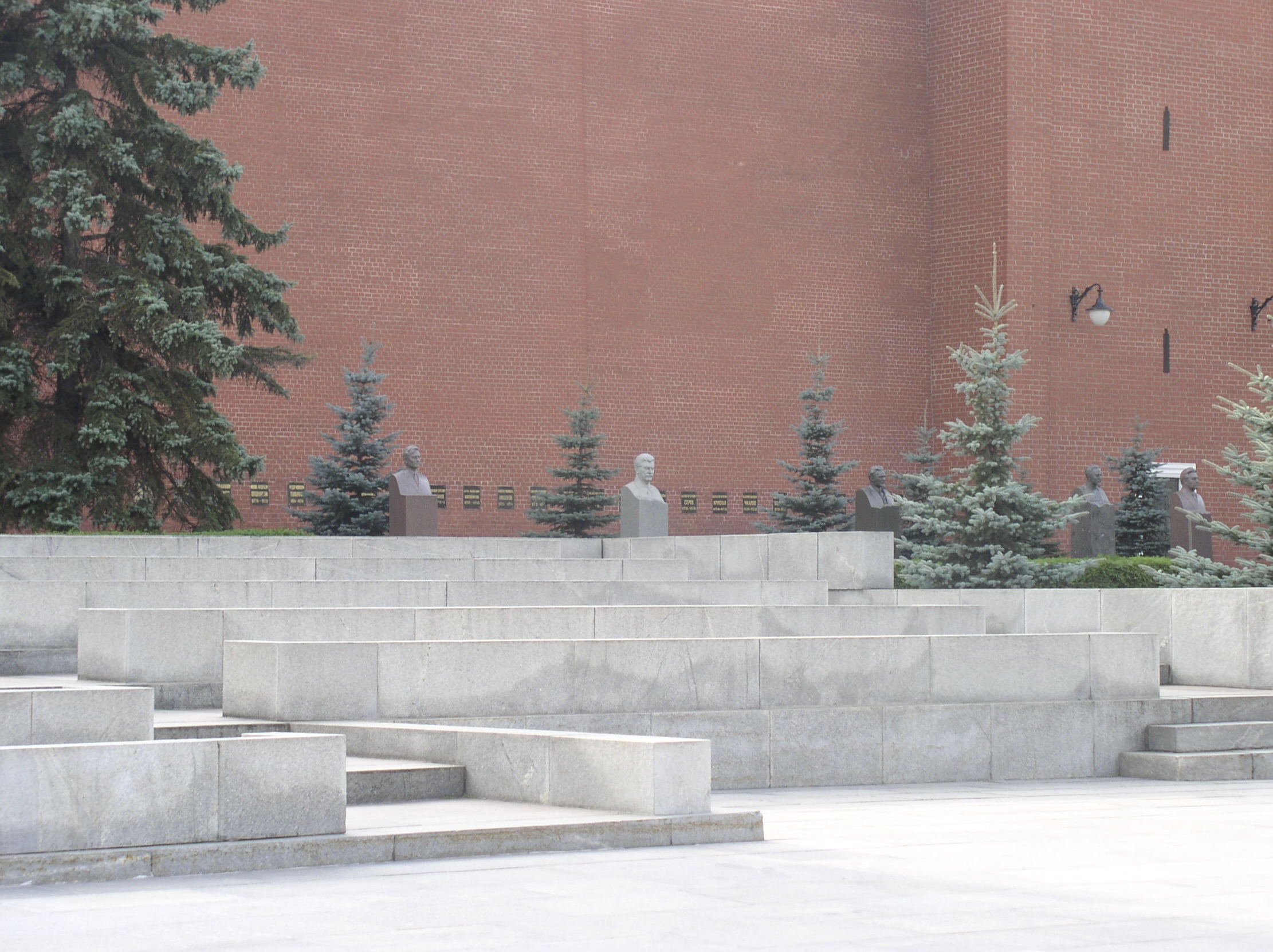
Raskova's ashes were buried in the necropolis of the Moscow Kremlin Wall, beside Osipenko's

=== In philately ===
Stamps

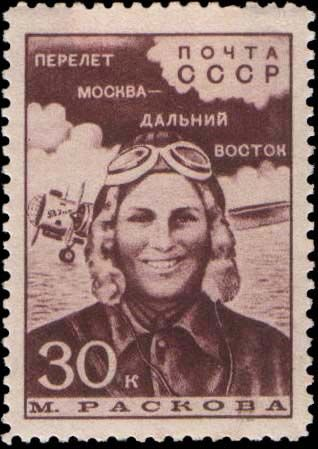
Soviet stamp, 1939

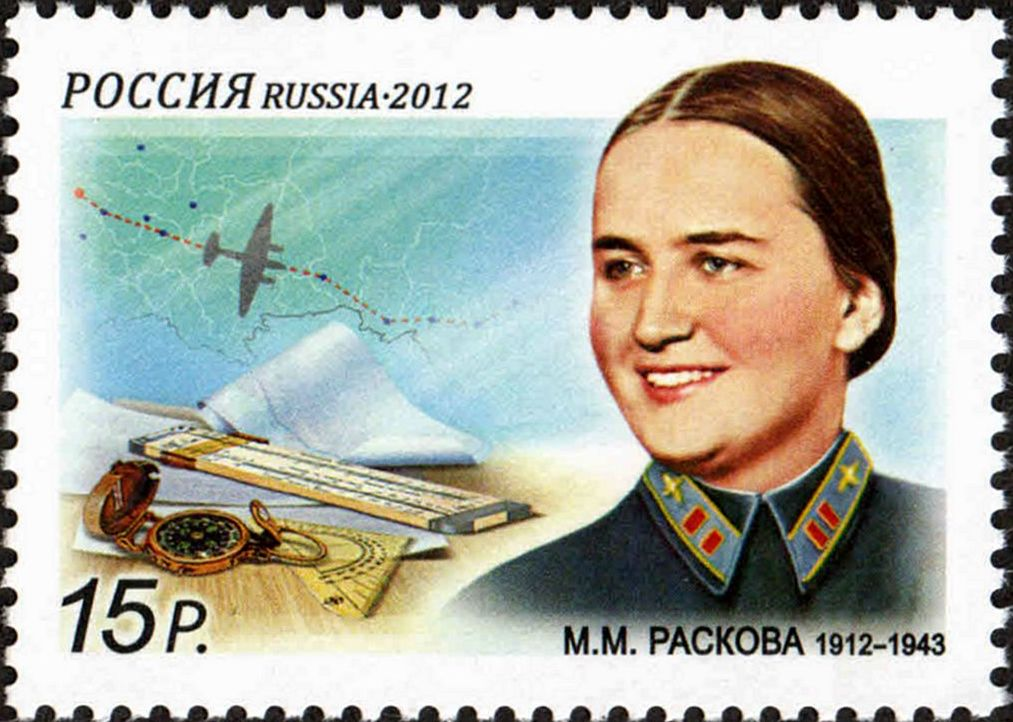
A stamp of Russia, 15 Rubles, 21 March 2012, in honor of 100th birth anniversary of the Soviet female pilot, navigator, Hero of Soviet Union Marina Raskova.

== See also ==
- List of female Heroes of the Soviet Union
- Kartamyshevskaya street of the Moldavanka historical district in Odesa, which was renamed M. Raskova street from 1953–1995.

== Bibliography ==
- Cottam, Kazimiera (1998). Women in War and Resistance: Selected Biographies of Soviet Women Soldiers. Newburyport, Massachusetts: Focus Publishing/R. Pullins Co. ISBN 1585101605. OCLC 228063546.
- "Hero of the Soviet Union." New York Herald Tribune, Jan 23, 1943. ProQuest 1267953857.
- "Many Nazi Planes are the Victims of Russian Women Fighter Pilots." New York Times, Jan 17, 1944.
- Pennington, Reina (2003). Amazons to Fighter Pilots: A Biographical Dictionary of Military Women. Greenwood Press. ISBN 0313291977.
- Pennington, Reina (2001). Wings, Women & War: Soviet Airwomen in World War II Combat. University Press of Kansas. ISBN 978-0-7006-1554-4.
- Sakaida, Henry (2003). Heroines of the Soviet Union: 1941–45. Osprey Publishing. ISBN 978-1-84176-598-3.
- Sorokina, M. A. "People and Procedures: Toward a History of the Investigation of Nazi Crimes in the USSR", Kritika: Explorations in Russian and Eurasian History, Volume 6, Issue 4, (2005) 797–831.
- Strebe, Amy Goodpaster. "The American Women Airforce Service Pilots and Soviet Airwomen of World War II." Order No. 1418728, San Jose State University, 2003.
- "RUSSIAN WOMAN FLIER KILLED ON ACTIVE DUTY: MAJOR RASKOVA, HEROINE OF SOVIET UNION, WIDELY KNOWN." New York Times, Jan 10, 1943.
- Pursley, Sasha D. "The Motherland Calls: The Taman' Guards Women's Aviation Unit in the Great Patriotic War." Order No. 3098757, University of California, Santa Cruz, 2003.
