= Valentina Grizodubova =

Soviet aviator (1909–1993)

- Валентина Степановна Гризодубова
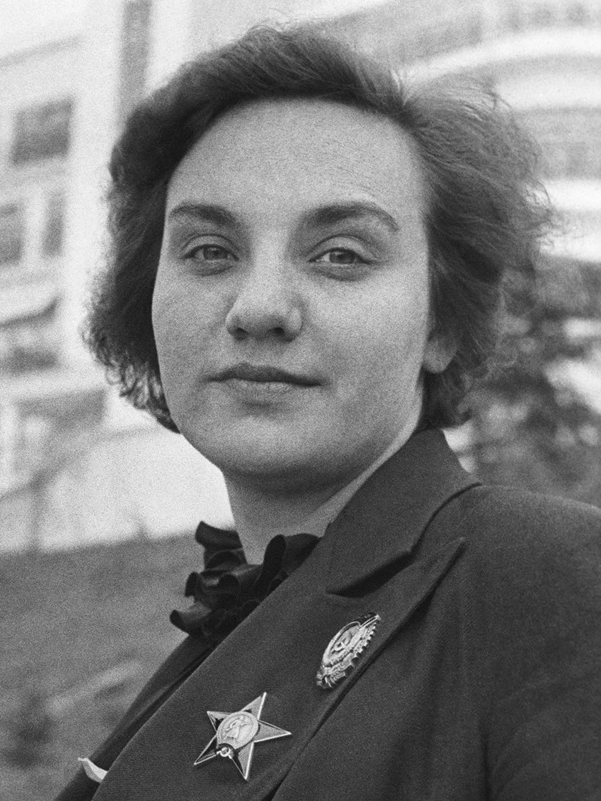
- Born: 10 May [O.S. 27 April] 1909; Kharkov, Kharkov Governorate, Russian Empire
- Died: 28 April 1993 (aged 83); Moscow, Russia
- Military career
- Allegiance: Soviet Union
- Branch: Soviet Air Forces
- Rank: Colonel
- Commands: 101st Long-Range Aviation Regiment
- Awards: Hero of the Soviet Union; Hero of Socialist Labour

Valentina Stepanovna Grizodubova (Russian: Валенти́на Степа́новна Гризоду́бова, Ukrainian: Валентина Степанівна Гризодубова Valentyna Stepanivna Hryzodubova; 10 May [O.S. 27 April] 1909 – 28 April 1993) was one of the first female pilots in the Soviet Union awarded the title Hero of the Soviet Union and the only female Hero of the Soviet Union to also be awarded the title Hero of Socialist Labour.

== Early life and pre-war career ==
Born in Kharkov, in the Kharkov Governorate of the Russian Empire (present-day Ukraine), she was the daughter of Stepan Vasilyevich Grizodubov, a pioneer aircraft-designer. At the age of fourteen, she flew a glider solo. She played piano and graduated from a conservatory as well as from the Kharkov Technical Institute. She spoke several foreign languages. In 1929 she graduated from the Penza Flying Club of the paramilitary association OSOAVIAKhIM. She also trained at the Kharkov Flight School.

In 1933 she graduated from the Tula Advanced Flying School. Here she became a flight instructor and trained 86 male pilots, many of whom became Heroes of Soviet Union. From 1934 to 1938 she flew in a "Propaganda" Squadron named after Maxim Gorky.

She flew many types of aircraft and set seven world records including one for highest altitude reached by a female pilot on a two-seater seaplane, 3,267 meters (10718.5 feet) on 15 October 1937, (FAI Record File Number 121.16) three speed records and one for long-distance flying between Moscow and Aktyubinsk together with Marina Raskova.

On September 24–25, 1938, flying as pilot-in-command with Marina Raskova as navigator and Polina Osipenko as co-pilot, she completed the 5,910-kilometer-long flight named Rodina (Russian for "Motherland") on an Tupolev ANT-37, setting an international women's record for a straight-line distance flight (FAI Record File Number 10444). She had already accumulated 5000 flight hours flight before the historic event; after the flight she and her crew members became the first women awarded the title Hero of the Soviet Union on 2 November 1938, also receiving a reward of 25,000 rubles.

== World War II ==
Starting in March 1942, she served in the Red Army. In May, she was appointed the first commanding officer of the 101st Long-Range Aviation Regiment, which consisted of about 300 men: pilots, navigators, engineers and ground support personnel. Her unit was equipped with Lisunov Li-2 transport aircraft (license-built versions of the Douglas DC-3) with pilots conscripted from the Civil Air Fleet.

Grizodubova's Li-2s had a crew of six aviators: pilot, co-pilot, navigator, flight-technician, radio operator and air gunner. The unit initially had the task of bombing enemy troops, then flying to partisans and – in June 1942 – helping supply the besieged Leningrad. Subsequently, the 101st Long-Range Bomber Air Regiment was ordered to bomb Wehrmacht units that had broken the Bryansk and South-Western Fronts and were heading for Voronezh. Grizodubova led her regiment almost every night, overcoming strong flak defences and Luftwaffe night fighters in the Kursk, Orel, and L'gov areas.

In September 1942 the 101st Long-Range Aviation Regiment was placed at the disposal of the Central HQ of the Partisan Movement. The unit flew more than 1,850 sorties to partisan-held areas, delivering about 1,500 tons of arms and ammunition and hundreds of tons of radio equipment, printing presses, film cameras, and reading material for Soviet partisan leaders. The Regiment also evacuated 2,500 wounded partisans and homeless orphans. However, poor airstrips and enemy fighters were a constant threat to the Li-2s and their crews. On Grizodubova's initiative, by March 1943 partisans had built an improved airstrip on the right bank of the Dnieper, where up to a dozen aircraft could be parked in daytime. On 27 May 1944 her regiment was awarded the honorific title Krasnosel'skiy for participating to break the siege of Leningrad. By the time Grizodubova was recalled to Moscow, in June 1944, she had flown about 200 sorties. Two months later, on 30 August, the 101st Long-Range Aviation Regiment was awarded the Order of the Red Banner and, later, the honorific of "Guards".

== Post war ==
In the 1940s she served as the sole female member of the "Extraordinary State Commission for Ascertaining and Investigating Crimes Perpetrated by the German-Fascist Invaders and their Accomplices" (Chrezvychainaia gosudarstvennaia komissiia or Чрезвычайная Государственная Комиссия; ChGK), appointed to investigate Nazi war crimes in the Soviet Union and to compensate the state for damages. She also assisted the future cosmonaut Svetlana Savitskaya in becoming a test pilot.

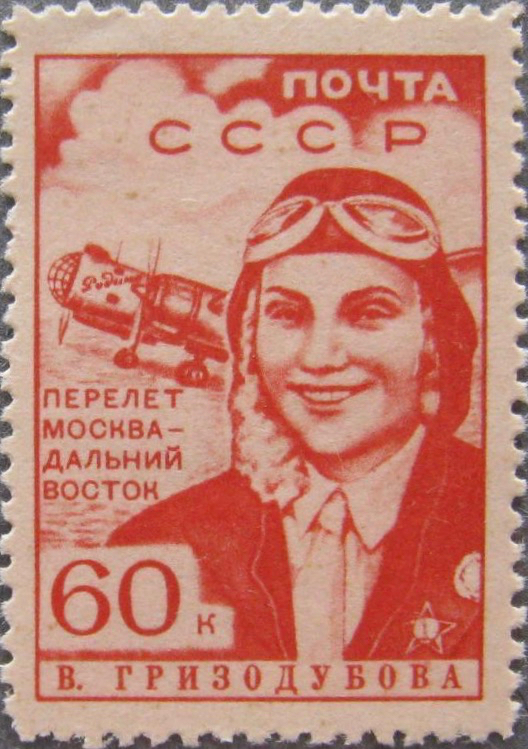
Grizodubova on the Soviet Union 1939 stamp

== Legacy ==
Grizodubova was made an Honorary Citizen of Penza. A statue of her stands in front of Kutuzovsky Prospekt 34 in Moscow. Streets are named after her in various cities of the former Soviet Union.

== Awards ==
- Hero of the Soviet Union (2 November 1938)
- Hero of Socialist Labour (6 January 1986)
- Two Orders of Lenin (2 November 1938 and 6 January 1986)
- Order of the October Revolution (26 April 1971)
- Order of the Patriotic War 1st Class (12 March 1943)
- Order of the Red Banner of Labour (25 December 1936)
- Order of the Red Star (19 December 1937)
- campaign and jubilee medals

== See also ==
- List of female Heroes of the Soviet Union

== Bibliography ==
- Cottam, Kazimiera (1998). Women in War and Resistance: Selected Biographies of Soviet Women Soldiers. Newburyport, MA: Focus Publishing/R. Pullins Co. ISBN 1585101605. OCLC 228063546.
- Milanetti, Gian Piero (2013). Soviet Airwomen of the Great Patriotic War - A pictorial history. Istituto Bibliografico Napoleone, Rome, Italy. ISBN 9788875651466.
- Milanetti, Gian Piero (2011). Le Streghe della Notte: La storia non detta delle eroiche ragazze-pilota dell'Unione Sovietica nella Grande Guerra Patriottica (in Italian). Istituto Bibliografico Napoleone, Roma, Italia. ISBN 978-88-7565-100-8.
- Pennington, Reina (1997). Wings, Women, and War: Soviet Airwomen in World War II Combat. University Press of Kansas. ISBN 0-7006-1554-7.
- Sakaida, Henry (2003). Heroines of the Soviet Union: 1941-45. Osprey Publishing. ISBN 978-1-84176-598-3.
- Simonov, Andrey; Chudinova, Svetlana (2017). Женщины - Герои Советского Союза и России. Moscow: Russian Knights Foundation, Museum of Technology V. Zadorozhny. ISBN 9785990960701. OCLC 1019634607.
- Sorokina, M. A. "People and Procedures: Toward a History of the Investigation of Nazi Crimes in the USSR," Kritika: Explorations in Russian and Eurasian History, Volume 6, Issue 4, (2005) 797-831.
- S. P. Korolev. Encyclopedia of life and creativity" - edited by C. A. Lopota, RSC Energia. S. P. Korolev, 2014 ISBN 978-5-906674-04-3
