= Nimelen =

River of Khabarovsk Krai

Nimelen Нимелен
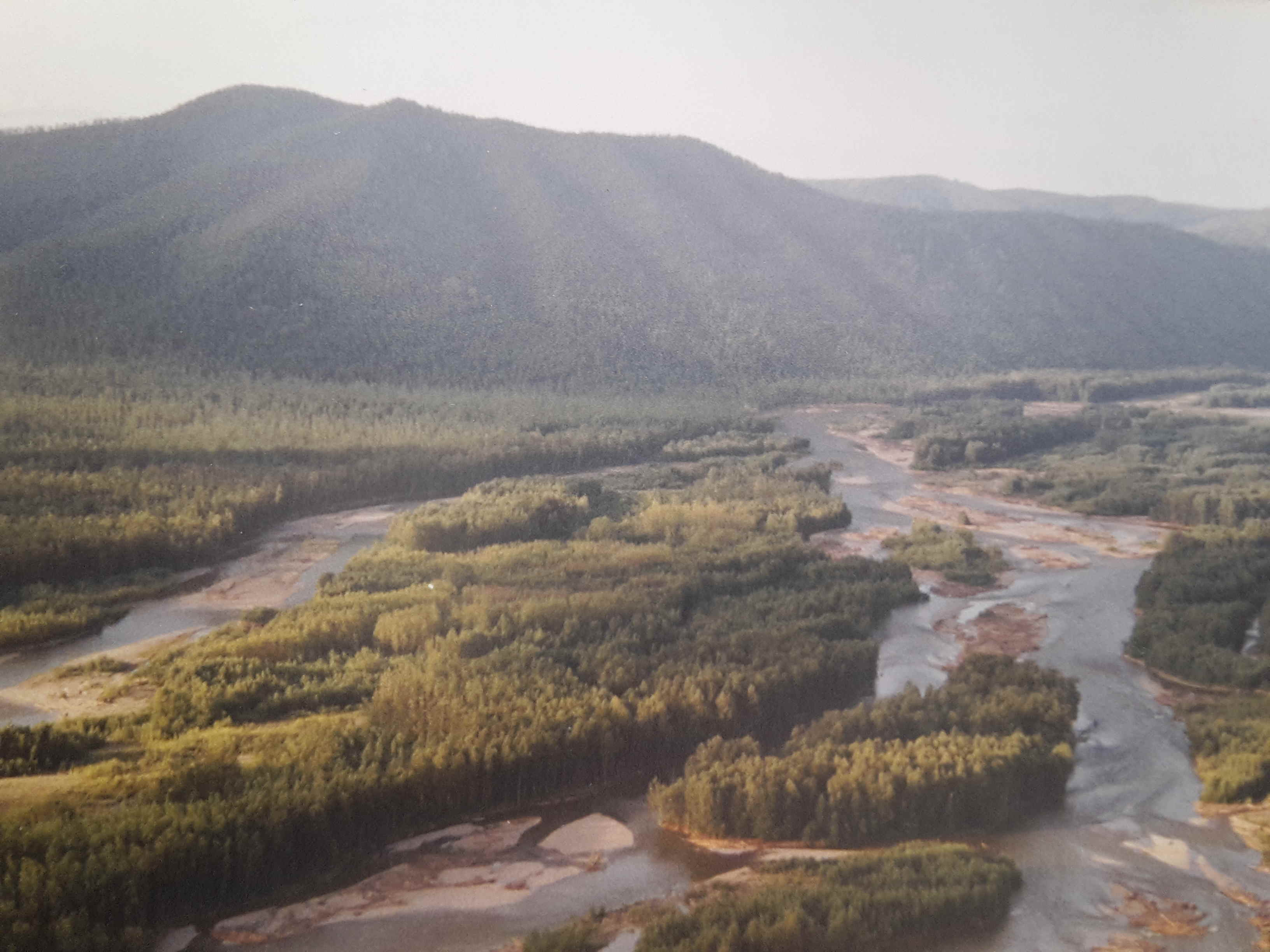
- Upper course in the Yam-Alin area.

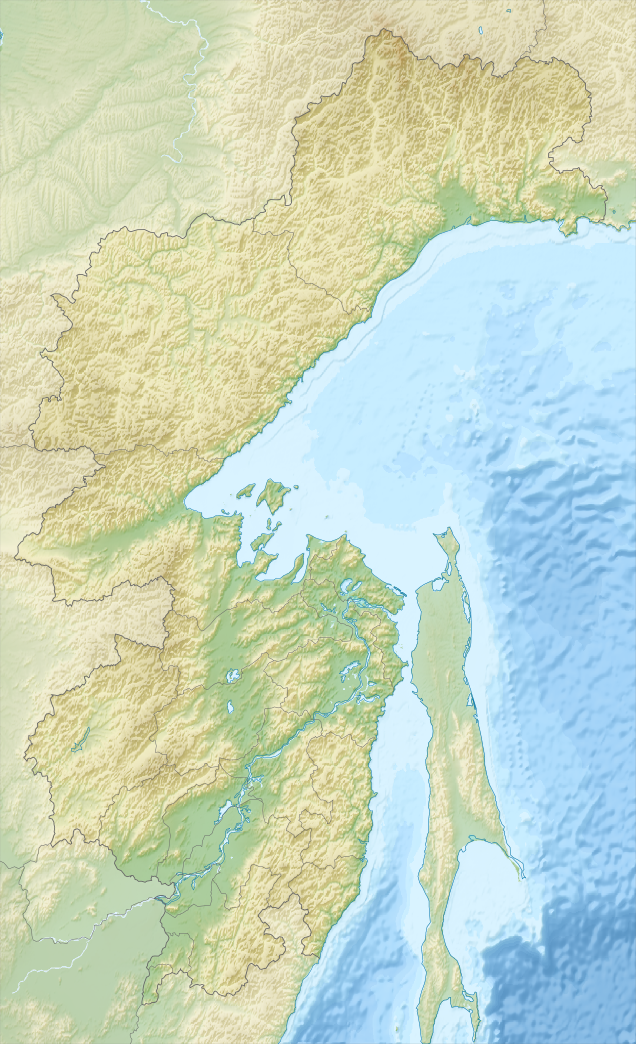
- Mouth location in Khabarovsk Krai, Russia

Location
- Country: Russia

Physical characteristics
- Source
  - location: Confluence of Mata and Seyamni-Makit; Yam-Alin
  - coordinates: 52°54′58″N 134°49′59″E
- Mouth: Amgun
  - coordinates: 52°25′57″N 136°35′27″E
  - elevation: 51 m (167 ft)
- Length: 311 km (193 mi)
- Basin size: 14,100 km^{2} (5,400 sq mi)
- Discharge
  - average: 157 m^{3}/s (5,500 cu ft/s)

Basin features
- Progression: Amgun → Amur→ Sea of Okhotsk

The Nimelen (Russian: Нимелен) is a river in Khabarovsk Krai, Russia. It is the longest tributary of the Amgun, with a length of 311 kilometres (193 mi) and a drainage basin area of 14,100 square kilometres (5,400 mi^{2}).

The Nimelen flows across a desolate, uninhabited area where the climate is harsh.

== Course ==
The Nimelen is a left tributary of the Amgun. It has its origin in the eastern slopes of the Yam-Alin, at the confluence of mountain rivers Mata and Seyamni-Makit. In the upper course the river flows roughly southeastwards within a narrow valley in the area of the Yam-Alin. The river channel is rocky, with frequent rapids.

After leaving the mountain area, the Nimelen flows first northeastwards across the Nimelen-Chukchagir Lowland and its valley expands. The river then bends and flows roughly southwards, while it meanders and divides into branches within a wide floodplain with marshes and numerous lakes. Finally it meets the Amgun 5 kilometres (3.1 mi) to the northeast of imeni Poliny Osipenko, the capital of the Imeni Poliny Osipenko District, 315 kilometres (196 mi) from the Amgun's mouth in the Amur.

=== Tributaries ===
The main tributaries of the Nimelen are the 92 kilometres (57 mi) long Upagda and the 254 kilometres (158 mi) long Kerby from the right, and the 159 kilometres (99 mi) long Omal from the left.

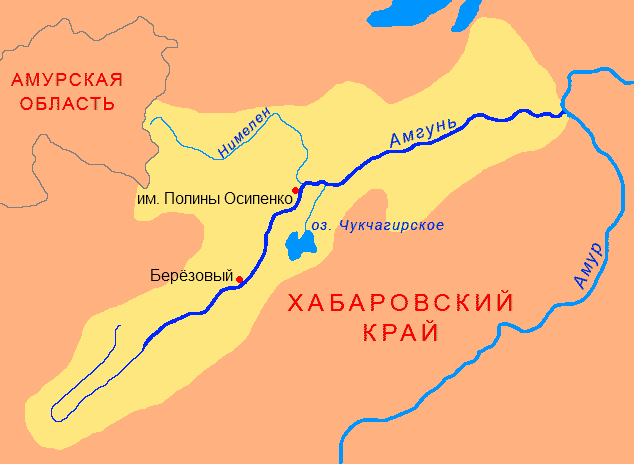
Basin of the Amgun

== Flora and fauna ==
The vegetation cover of the Nimelen basin is poorer in comparison with other areas of the region.

Lenok, taimen, grayling, Common bream, carp, burbot, Amur pike and crucian carp are among the fish species found in the waters of the Nimelen river.

== See also ==
- List of rivers of Russia
