= G. A. Beazeley =

British Army officer and surveyor

George Adam Beazeley DSO (7 July 1870 – 8 May 1961) was a British Army officer, surveyor and one of the fathers of aerial photography in surveying, military reconnaissance and archaeology. He was probably the first person to identify aerial archaeology as an independent field.

Beazeley was the son of a civil engineer. He was educated at Chigwell Grammar School and Cherbourg School, Malvern, before training at the Royal Military Academy, Woolwich and being commissioned second lieutenant in the Royal Engineers in February 1890. He attended the School of Military Engineering from 1890 to 1892 and the spent two years with the submarine mining unit in Cork Harbour, Ireland. He was promoted lieutenant in February 1893. In 1894 he was posted to India, where he spent most of the rest of his career.

He continued to work in submarine mining until 1897, when he changed his speciality to surveying and joined the Survey of India, where he stayed until his retirement in 1925. He was promoted captain in December 1900 and major in January 1910. He was attached as survey officer to the Somaliland Field Force in 1903–1904, when he was mentioned in despatches.

In October 1916 he was posted to Mesopotamia, where he was in charge of all field survey work on the Tigris front until April 1917, initially assisted by only three British soldiers and about sixteen native porters and orderlies. He also flew many reconnaissance missions and carried out considerable archaeological investigations, both from the air and on the ground. He identified the remains of ancient Samarra and discovered the outlines of ancient canals on the Tigris-Euphrates plain. He was promoted lieutenant-colonel in December 1917 and awarded the Distinguished Service Order (DSO) for his services on 1 January 1918. On 2 May 1918 he was shot down and captured by the Turks, remaining a prisoner of war until 16 November, just after the end of the war.

In 1919 and from 1921 to 1922 he was attached to the Royal Air Force. He retired from the Army in July 1925, but in 1929 joined the Sudan Air Survey for a year. He and his wife Annette (whom he had married in 1900) retired to Saint Aubin, Jersey, but from 1938 he worked in air raid precautions. He left the Channel Islands for England in 1940, just before the German occupation, and continued to work in ARP until 1942, when he took up office work in Totnes, also in connection with the war. He returned to Jersey after the liberation in July 1945 and spent his retirement living in the Grouville Hall Hotel after Annette died in 1950.

On 4 November 1938, his daughter Rozel, her husband, Captain William Swan, also of the Royal Engineers, and their baby daughter were killed in the crash of the airliner St Catherine's Bay at Jersey Airport.
