= Jersey Airways =

British airline, 1933–1947

- Founded: December 1933
- Commenced operations: December 1933
- Ceased operations: 1 September 1945 (merged to form Channel Islands Airways)
- Headquarters: Portsmouth Airport

Jersey Airways was an airline that operated air services to and from the Channel Islands from 1933 until 1947, when it became part of British European Airways.

== History ==
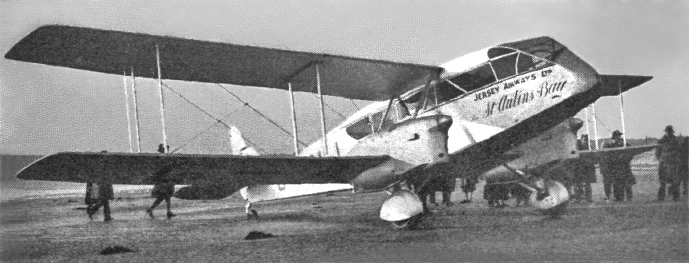
de Havilland DH.84 Dragon 2 "St Aubin's Bay", at West Park beach, St Aubin's Bay, in 1933

Jersey Airways Ltd. was formed by Walter Thurgood on 9 December 1933. The first commercial service took place on 18 December; a passenger service from Jersey to Portsmouth. In the absence of a proper airport, the aircraft used St. Aubin's beach at West Park, St. Helier, and the airline had its maintenance base at Portsmouth Airport, (moving to Southampton Airport in 1935). On Sunday, 28 January 1934, the first flights began from Heston Aerodrome in Middlesex (with a special bus connection from London) to Jersey, in March 1934 flights began from Southampton, and during summer 1934, a service was operated to Paris. In its first full year, Jersey Airways carried 20,000 passengers, using a fleet of eight de Havilland DH.84 Dragons, each capable of carrying eight passengers.

On 1 December 1934, Channel Islands Airways was registered as a holding company for Jersey Airways Ltd. and its subsidiary Guernsey Airways Ltd. which had been formed a week earlier. Shares were bought by the Great Western Railway and the Southern Railway. This allowed expansion, and in 1935, six four-engined de Havilland DH.86 Expresses and two de Havilland Dragon Rapides were introduced to replace the Dragons. On 8 January 1935, a service began to Rennes in France, although on 29 March 1935 it ceased. In April 1936, a Plymouth-Jersey service began, and in 1938 to Exeter, Dinard and Shoreham.

Jersey Airport opened on 10 March 1937, and Jersey Airways was able to operate a fixed timetable that no longer depended on the state of the tides. This also meant the company obtained the mail-carrying contract, freight traffic increased, and night flights could begin.

Meanwhile, in Guernsey, things were at a less advanced stage, and most air services were those by flying boats and amphibians. Guernsey Airways was very much smaller than its sister company in Jersey. Two flying boats were used: Saro Windhover G-ABJP and Saro Cloud G-ABXW, named "Cloud of Iona". In May 1939, Guernsey's new airport was opened. On 8 May 1939, Guernsey Airways began a service to Southampton, using a DH.86A (G-ADVK) and a DH.86B (G-AENR), later joined by a DH.95 Flamingo (G-AFUF). In June 1939, the prototype Flamingo (G-AFUE) was evaluated by Jersey Airways, but further orders for the type were frustrated by world events.

At the outbreak of war on 3 September 1939, flights to the Channel Islands ceased. In November 1939, services resumed from Shoreham, under the direction of National Air Communications. On 13 June 1940, all scheduled air services between the United Kingdom and the Channel Islands were suspended. The following day, Jersey Airways began flying its staff and equipment to the United Kingdom mainland, and on 18–19 June 1940, the DH.86 fleet was used to evacuate 320 islanders to the mainland, before German forces occupied the islands on 1 July 1940. One DH.86 (G-ADVK) was on overhaul at Jersey at the time, and was abandoned; the rest of the fleet was impressed into RAF service.

Following the liberation of the islands in 1945, Channel Islands Airways resumed scheduled services in June 1945, using ex-RAF DH.89A Dragon Rapides. Jersey Airways and Guernsey Airways flights then terminated at Southampton and at Croydon Airport. In May 1946, a Bristol 170 Wayfarer (G-AGVB) was loaned to Channel Islands Airways.

In 1947, the British government nationalised the UK airlines, including Jersey Airways, to be included in British European Airways (BEA). The Channel Islands authorities resisted this move, feeling that it was unacceptable to be dictated to by the British Government, which had no legal jurisdiction over the islands. However it was made plain that flights from the Channel Islands would not otherwise be allowed to land in England, and consequently on 1 April 1947, the airline staff, the eight Dragon Rapides and their routes all became part of BEA.

== Accidents ==
- 29 June 1936: de Havilland DH.84 Dragon Rozel Bay overshot Alderney Airport. It was landing with six passengers on board and the pilot, Mr Martin, a pilot new to the airline, ran out of runway, breaking the starboard propeller, and damaging the undercarriage as he hit a bank. He had the choice of hitting six cows or the bank; he chose the bank. There were no fatalities, and the aircraft flew soon after.
- 31 July 1936: Saro A.19 Cloud amphibian G-ABXW "Cloud of Iona" went missing on a flight from Guernsey to Jersey on a stormy evening. All ten occupants died. The investigation concluded that the aircraft was forced to land in the sea due to loss of engine power, and was then swamped by the waves.
- 4 November 1938: DH.86 G-ACZN "St. Catherine's Bay" crashed at St. Peter's shortly after take-off from Jersey airport, en route to Southampton. All 13 occupants were killed in addition to one person on the ground.

== See also ==
- List of defunct airlines of the United Kingdom
