= Imeni Poliny Osipenko District =

Imeni Poliny Osipenko District район имени Полины Осипенко (Russian)
- District
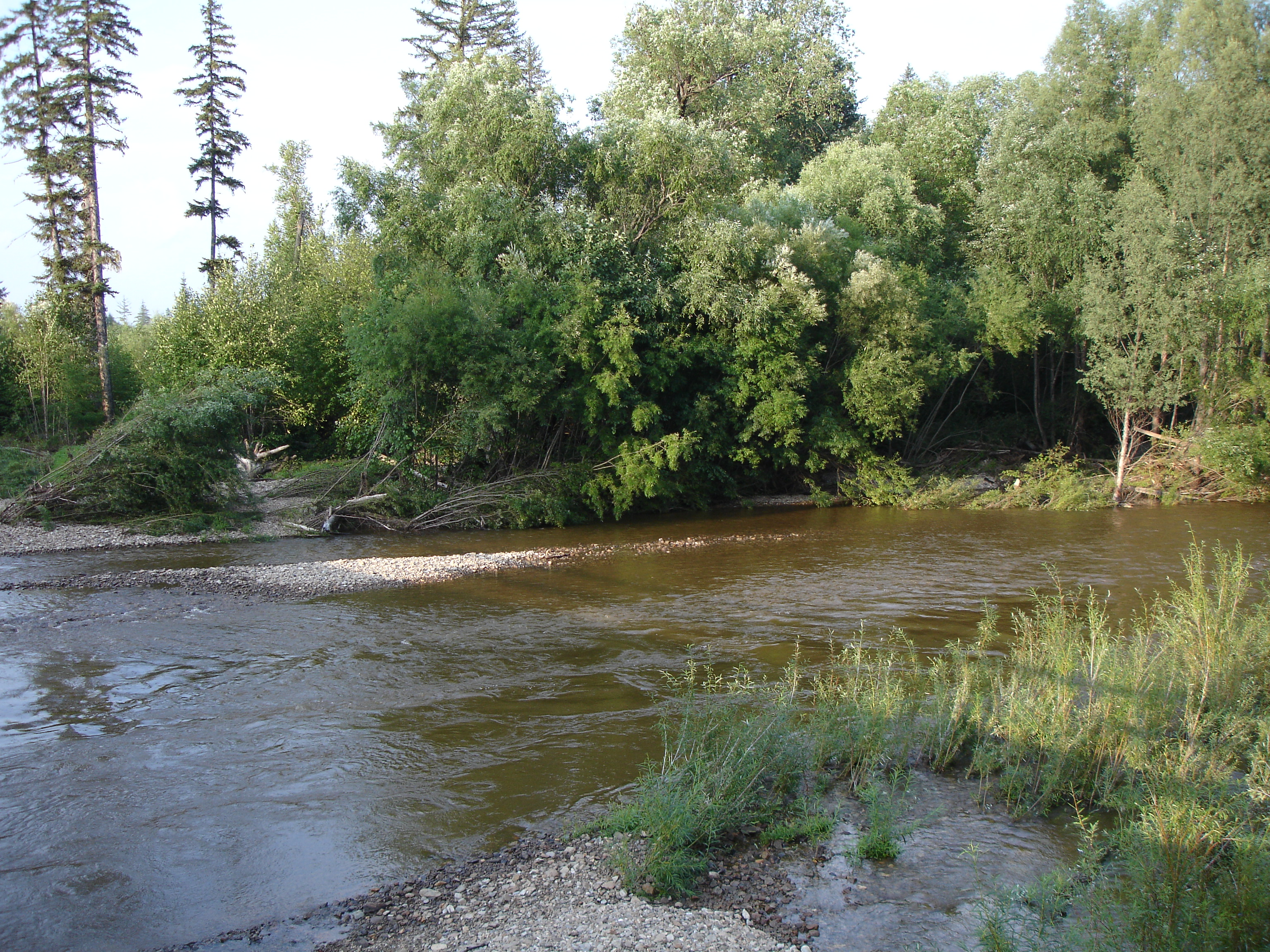
- Taiga of Far East near Imeni Poliny Osipenko village

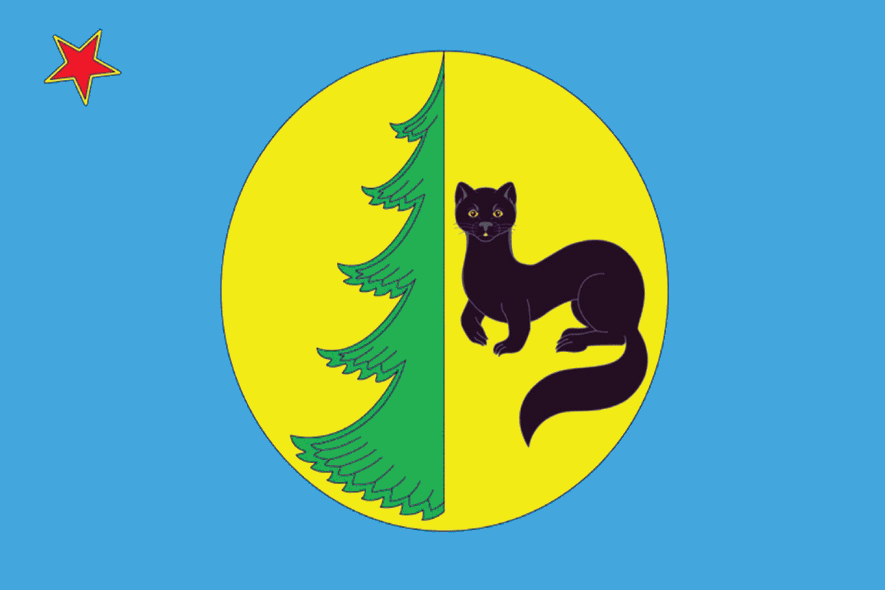
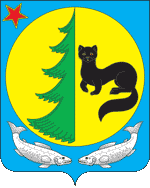
- Flag Coat of arms
- Location of Imeni Poliny Osipenko District in Khabarovsk Krai
- Coordinates: 52°25′14″N 136°28′55″E
- Country: Russia
- Federal subject: Khabarovsk Krai
- Established: 1926
- Administrative center: imeni Poliny Osipenko

Area
  - Total: 34,560 km^{2} (13,340 sq mi)

Population (2010 Census)
  - Total: 5,198
  - Density: 0.1504/km^{2} (0.3895/sq mi)
  - Urban: 0%
  - Rural: 100%

Administrative structure
  - Inhabited localities: 16 rural localities

Municipal structure
  - Municipally incorporated as: Imeni Poliny Osipenko Municipal District
  - Municipal divisions: 0 urban settlements, 5 rural settlements
- Time zone: UTC+10 (MSK+7)
- OKTMO ID: 08637000
- Website: http://www.rayonosipenko.ru/

Imeni Poliny Osipenko District (Russian: райо́н и́мени Поли́ны Осипе́нко) is an administrative and municipal district (raion), one of the seventeen in Khabarovsk Krai, Russia. It is located in the center of the krai. The area of the district is 34,560 square kilometers (13,340 sq mi). Its administrative center is the rural locality (a selo) of imeni Poliny Osipenko. Population: 5,198 (2010 census); 6,568 (2002 census); 7,651 (1989 Soviet census). The population of the administrative center accounts for 43.3% of the district's total population.

== Geography ==
The district is mountainous. In the western part rise the Yam-Alin, Dusse-Alin, Etkil-Yankansky, Mevadzha and Koltoursky ranges; in the eastern part, parallel to the Amgun River, rise the Kivun, Omal, Omeldin and Chayatyn ranges. The Nimelen-Chukchagir Lowland is located in the central part of the district.

The main rivers of the district are the Amgun and its tributaries Nimelen, Nilan and Semi, as well as the Oldzhikan, Uda and Somnia (Сомня). The Amgun is navigable from the mouth to imeni Poliny Osipenko village. There are about four thousand lakes in the district. The largest are Chukchagir (366 km^{2} (141 sq mi)) and Dzhevdokha (19 km^{2} (7.3 sq mi)).
