= Polina Osipenko =

Soviet aviator (1907–1939)

- Поліна Денисівна Осипенко
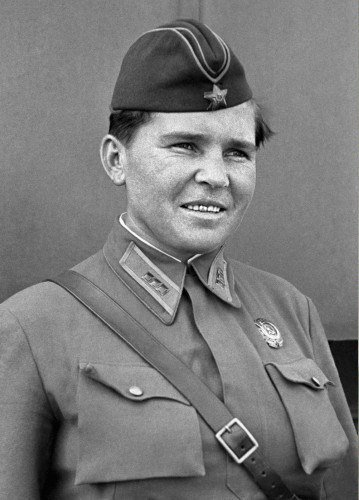
- Osipenko in 1938
- Born: 8 October 1907; Novospasovka, Yekaterinoslav Governorate, Russian Empire
- Died: 11 May 1939 (aged 31); Vysokoye, Rybnovsky District, Ryazan Oblast, Russian SFSR, USSR
- Spouse: Alexander Osipenko
- Military career
- Allegiance: Soviet Union
- Branch: Soviet Air Force
- Service years: 1933–1939
- Rank: Major
- Awards: Hero of the Soviet Union

Polina Denisovna Osipenko (Russian: Полина Денисовна Осипенко, Ukrainian: Поліна Денисівна Осипенко, romanized: Polina Denysivna Osypenko; 8 October 1907 – 11 May 1939) was a Soviet military pilot who, with Valentina Grizodubova and Marina Raskova on 24–25 September 1938, performed a nonstop flight between Moscow and the Sea of Okhotsk, setting a new women's nonstop flight distance record. For this, they were the first three women made Heroes of the Soviet Union on 2 November 1938.

== Early life ==
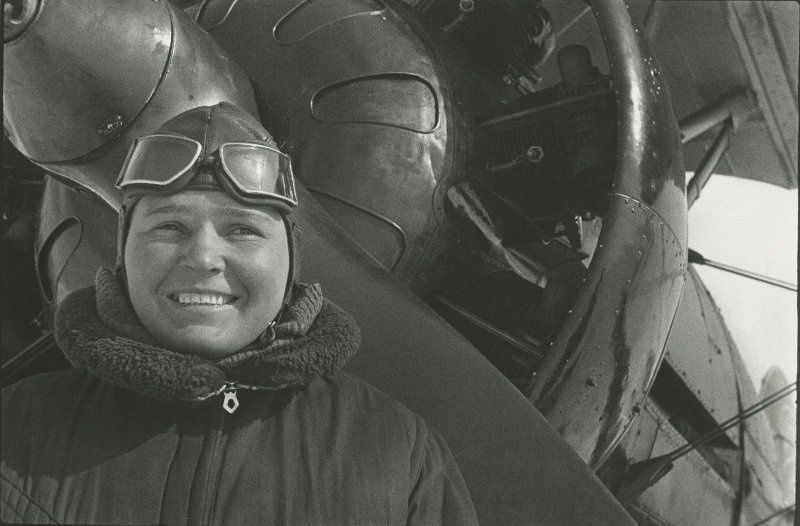
Osipenko by an aircraft, 1936

Osipenko was born as Polina Dudnik in 1907 in Novospasovka, Yekaterinoslav Governorate (currently Zaporizhzhia Oblast of Ukraine) to a Ukrainian peasant family and the ninth child born to her family. She worked at a collective farm until leaving for flight school in 1930. Between 1930 and 1933, she studied at the Kazan Flight School.

== Aviation career ==
After graduating from flight school Osipenko subsequently served as military officer, flying a fighter. In 1937, she set three world records for altitude. In October 1937, she and Raskova set the women's flight distance record by flying from Moscow to Aktobe (1,444.722 kilometres (897.709 mi)), and in July 1938, Osipenko, Vera Lomako, and Raskova set a new record by flying non-stop from Sevastopol to Arkhangelsk in a Beriev MP-1.

On 24 September, Grizodubova, Osipenko, and Raskova set on what was supposed to be a non-stop flight from Moscow to Komsomolsk-on-Amur in a Tupolev ANT-37. Because of difficult weather conditions, they missed the Komsomolsk airfield, and found themselves at the shore of the Sea of Okhotsk without any fuel left. Grizodubova, who was the pilot-in-command of the aircraft, decided to crash-land in the forest. Raskova was ordered to parachute out of the plane, forgetting her emergency kit. The remains of the aircraft were found by rescue crews eight days after the landing. Raskova found her way to them through the woods ten days after the crash. Grizodubova and Osipenko remained in the aircraft during the landing and survived the crash. They still set the women's flight distance record and won the title Hero of the Soviet Union on 2 November 1938, the only women to do so before the Second World War.

Osipenko was killed during a training flight with Anatoly Serov in a UTI-4 on 11 May 1939.

== See also ==
- List of female Heroes of the Soviet Union
- Valentina Grizodubova
- Marina Raskova
