= Tupolev ANT-37 =

Soviet long-range bomber prototype

ANT-37 (DB-2)
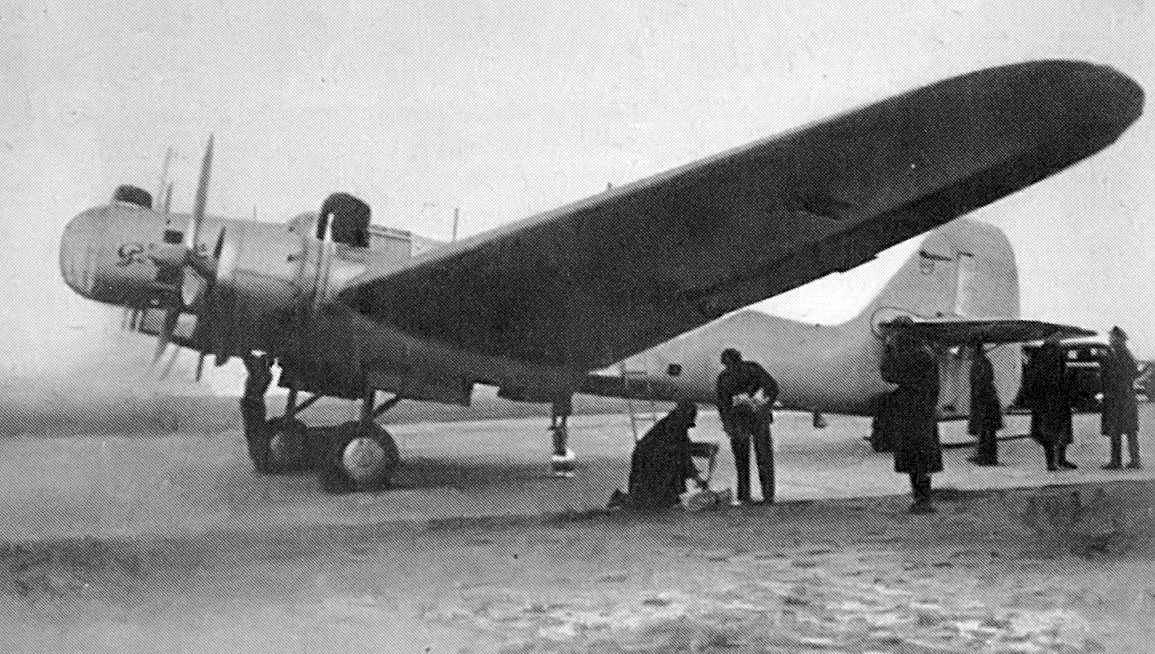

General information
- Type: Long-range bomber
- National origin: Soviet Union
- Manufacturer: Tupolev
- Designer: Pavel Sukhoi
- Primary user: Aeroflot
- Number built: 4

History
- First flight: 16 Jun 1935
- Developed from: Tupolev DB-1

The Tupolev ANT-37 (or DB-2) was a Soviet twin-engined long-range bomber designed and built by the Tupolev design bureau, the design team operating under the guidance of Pavel Sukhoi. The aircraft did not enter production, but three examples of the type were used for research and record breaking flights.

== Design and development ==
Based on the unbuilt Tupolev ANT-36 (DB-1) single-engined bomber, the ANT-37 was a twin-engined monoplane of stressed skin, dural construction, fitted with a high-aspect-ratio wing and tailwheel landing gear, the main units retracting into the engine nacelles.

Powered by 800 hp (597 kW) Gnome-Rhône 14K radial engines, the prototype first flew on 16 June 1935. The program suffered a setback when the prototype crashed the following month after its tail structure broke apart in flight. A re-designed second prototype was built, designated as the DB-2D, in an attempt to overcome the design problems encountered during flight testing, particularly with the tail unit.

It was decided not to order the type into production, the Ilyushin DB-3 being selected for Soviet Air Force service instead. Despite this, three aircraft were built, designated ANT-37bis (or DB-2B), for research and record breaking purposes. These three aircraft would survive into the 1940s.

== Operational history ==
The first of the three DB-2B aircraft was given the name Rodina ("Motherland"), and, flown by an all female crew (Valentina Grizodubova, Polina Osipenko, and Marina Raskova) between 24 and 25 September 1938, it was used to establish a distance record of 5,908 km (3,671 mi) before ending in an emergency landing. This set a world's record for distance flown by a woman crew.

== Operators ==
Soviet Union

- Aeroflot

== Specifications (DB-2) ==
Data from

General characteristics

- Crew: 3
- Length: 15.00 m (49 ft 2 in)
- Wingspan: 31.00 m (101 ft 8 in)
- Wing area: 84.9 m^{2} (913 sq ft)
- Empty weight: 5,855 kg (12,908 lb)
- Gross weight: 12,500 kg (27,558 lb)
- Powerplant: 2 × Gnome-Rhône 14K , 597 kW (800 hp) each

Performance

- Maximum speed: 342 km/h (213 mph, 185 kn)
- Range: 5,000 km (3,105 mi, 2,698 nmi)

== See also ==
Aircraft of comparable role, configuration, and era

- Ilyushin DB-3

Related lists

- List of military aircraft of the Soviet Union and the CIS
