= Amgun =

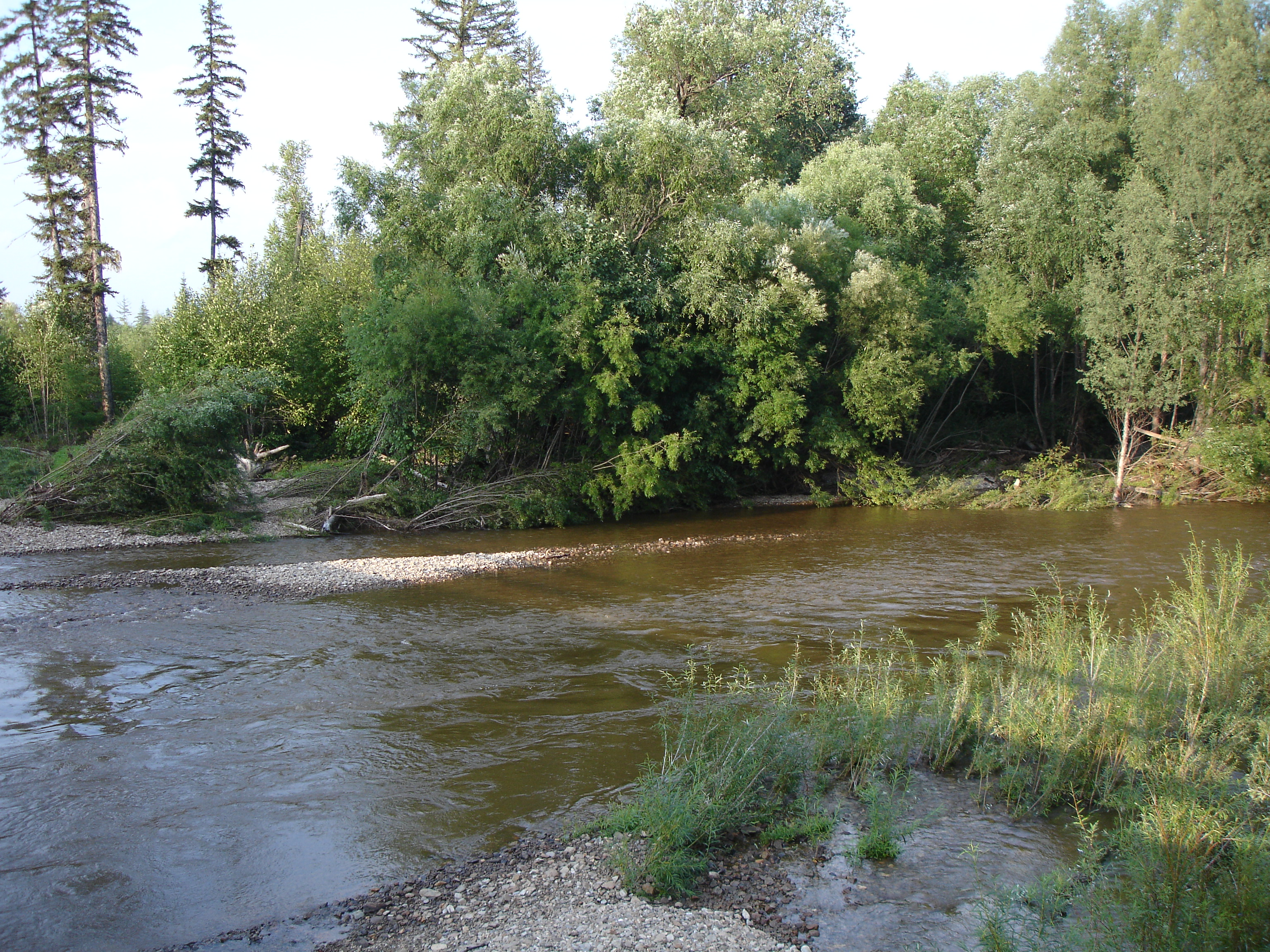

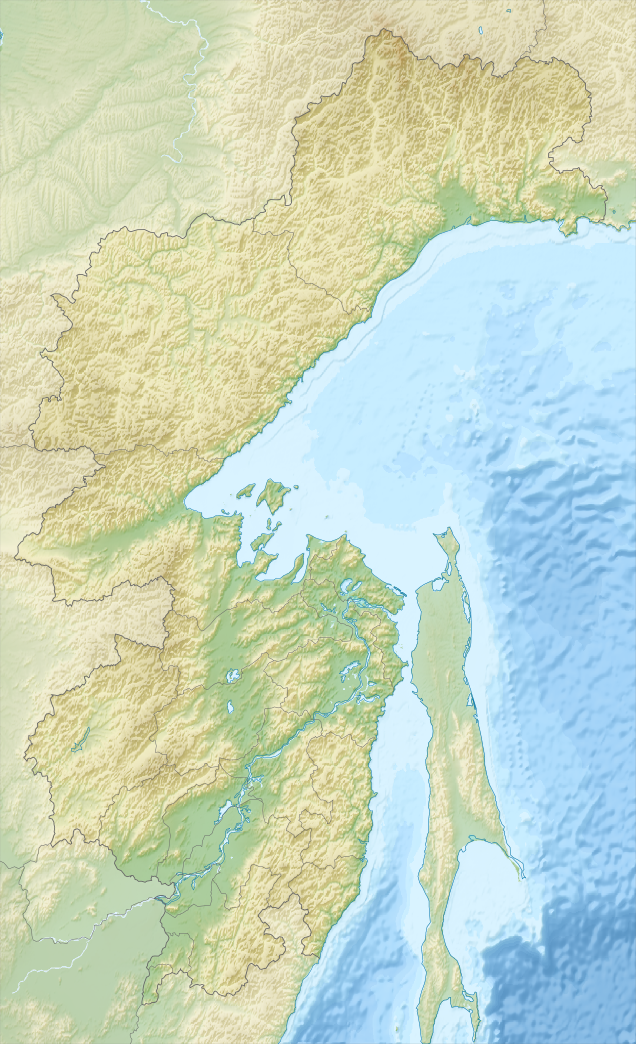
- Mouth location in Khabarovsk Krai, Russia
- Native name: Амгунь (Russian)

Location
- Country: Russia
- Federal subject: Khabarovsk Krai

Physical characteristics
- Source: confluence Ayakit and Suluk
- Mouth: Amur
  - coordinates: 52°56′45″N 139°41′37″E
- Length: 723 km (449 mi)
- Basin size: 55,500 km^{2} (21,400 sq mi)
- Discharge
  - location: confluence with Amur
  - average: 600 m^{3}/s (21,000 cu ft/s)
- Discharge
  - location: Guta
  - average: 489 m^{3}/s (17,300 cu ft/s)

Basin features
- Progression: Amur→ Sea of Okhotsk

The Amgun (Russian: Амгу́нь) is a river in Khabarovsk Krai, Russia that flows northeast and joins the river Amur from the left 146 kilometres (91 mi) upstream from its outflow into sea. The length of the river is 723 kilometres (449 mi). The area of its basin is 55,500 square kilometres (21,400 mi^{2}). The Amgun is formed by the confluence of the Ayakit and Suluk. Its main tributary is the Nimelen. The Amgun teems with fish, such as Hucho taimen, humpback salmon, sturgeon, and carp. The Baikal–Amur Mainline railway enters the Amgun valley from the Dusse-Alin Tunnel and follows the river 180 kilometres (110 mi) northeast to Beryozovy, where it turns southeast to Komsomolsk-on-Amur.

The Amgun was known as Xinggun River (興衮河) in Chinese. At its mouth is the village of Tyr, which was a Chinese fort during the Ming and Qing dynasties.

== See also ==
- List of rivers of Russia
