= Tatyana Sumarokova =

Soviet navigator and Guard Lieutenant (1922–1997)

- Татьяна Николаевна Сумарокова
- Sumarokova, c. 1945
- Born: 16 September 1922; Moscow, Soviet Russia
- Died: 28 May 1997 (aged 74); Moscow, Russian Federation
- Military career
- Allegiance: Soviet Union
- Branch: Soviet Air Force
- Service years: 1942–1945
- Rank: Guard Lieutenant
- Unit: 46th Tamans Guards Night Bomber Aviation Regiment
- Conflicts: World War II
- Awards: Hero of the Russian Federation

Tatyana Nikolaevna Sumarokova (Russian: Татьяна Николаевна Сумарокова; 16 September 1922 – 28 May 1997) was a Soviet navigator and Guard Lieutenant in the 46th Taman Guards Night Bomber Aviation Regiment during the Second World War. Rejected for the title Hero of the Soviet Union in 1945 after completing 725 sorties, she was eventually awarded the title Hero of the Russian Federation in 1995.

== Early life ==
Sumarokova was born on 16 September 1922 to a Russian family. After graduating from secondary school in 1939 she entered the 1st Moscow State Medical Institute where she studied until the start of the war. Initially she remained a civilian and worked in the construction of defensive fortifications around Moscow. She eventually got word that women were being recruited for aviation units, and non-pilot staff were needed, so she and her friend Khiuaz Dospanova made an appointment to meet with Marina Raskova, who at their meeting asked if she was willing to become a navigator.

== Military career ==
Upon being accepted into the women's aviation program in October 1941, Sumarokova underwent navigator's training at the Engels Military Aviation School with the rest of the women accepted into the program. After completing navigation training in February 1942 she underwent further flight training to compensate for her previous lack of aviation experience, graduating from training in time for deployment to the front on 23 May 1942 as part of the 588th Night Bomber Regiment; the women's aviation unit arrived on the North Caucasian Front on 27 May. She received her first Order of the Red Banner in September that same year after making several combat sorties in heavy autumn fog. By October 1942 she had completed 146 sorties.

Throughout the war Sumarokova took part in offensives over Kuban, Crimea, the Caucasus, Taman, Krasnodar, Belarus, and the Baltics. In 1943 she flew on numerous resupply missions to send ammunition, paratroopers, and provisions to forces in Eltigen, Crimea through heavy autumn storms and heavy enemy fire. In 1943 the 588th Night Bomber Regiment was honored with the Guards designation and renamed the 46th Guards Night Bomber Regiment. By October 1943 she had completed 390 sorties. On a mission over Kerch on 31 December 1943, she narrowly survived a mission when her Po-2 piloted by Vera Tikhomirova was hit by flak and caught fire. The plane began to lose altitude and Tikhomirova was prepared to carry out ditching at sea but managed to safely land the plane in friendly territory. Having been promoted to the position of squadron navigator in September 1944, she helped train new navigators in addition to regular combat duties, and distinguished herself as an excellent teacher for quickly training eight ground crew personnel as navigators. By the end of the war she totaled 725 combat sorties, dropping 108 tonnes of bombs, more than half of which she navigated for Mariya Smirnova.

Nominated for the title Hero of the Soviet Union on 10 May 1945, she never received the title – despite opinions in favor of awarding her it from several high-ranking military officers reviewing the nomination including Konstantin Vershinin and Konstantin Rokossovsky; she was subsequently awarded an Order of the Patriotic War 1st class instead.

== Later life ==
Upon entering the reserve in October 1945 due to the end of the war and went on to study editorializing and publishing at the Moscow State University of Printing Arts. She and a fellow veteran from her unit, Raisa Aronova were admitted to the Union of Journalists of the USSR. For 15 years she worked as an editor for the Physical Culture and Sport publishing house before writing for the newspaper Soviet Patriot and later the Znanie publishing house. In 1976 she published a book about the lives of two of her veteran friends – Hero of the Soviet Union Yekaterina Ryabova and her husband, twice Hero of the Soviet Union Grigory Sivkov. Sumarokova often engaged in public speaking after the war, especially to youth groups. After the dissolution of the Soviet Union and her nomination for the gold star came up again, she was awarded the title Hero of the Russian Federation in 1995. She died on 28 May 1997 in Moscow and was buried in the Kuntsevo Cemetery.

== Awards ==
- Hero of the Russian Federation (11 October 1995)
- Two Order of the Red Banner (19 October 1942 and 22 May 1945)
- Order of the Patriotic War 1st class (2 December 1945)
- Two Order of the Patriotic War 2nd class (30 October 1943 and 11 March 1985)
- Order of Friendship of Peoples (28 September 1981)
- Order of the Red Star (26 April 1944)
- campaign and jubilee medals

== See also ==
- List of female Heroes of the Soviet Union
- Polikarpov Po-2
- Night Witches
