= Glafira Kashirina =

Glafira Alekseevna Kashirina
- Глафира Алексеевна Каширина
- Born: 1920 (Note: Official records state her date of year of birth to be 1920, but some sources state she was born in 1925.); Sergievka, Tambov Governorate, Russian SFSR
- Died: 1 August 1943 (aged 22–23); Krasni, Krymsky District, Soviet Union
- Military career
- Allegiance: Soviet Union
- Branch: Soviet Air Force
- Service years: 1941 — 1943
- Rank: Junior lieutenant
- Nicknames: Irina, Glasha
- Unit: 46th Guards Night Bomber Aviation Regiment
- Conflicts: World War II; Eastern Front †
- Awards: Order of the Red Banner; Order of the Patriotic War, 2nd class

Glafira Alekseevna Kashirina (Russian: Глафира Алексеевна Каширина, 1920 – 1 August 1943) was a mechanic and later navigator in the 588th Night Bomber Regiment of the Soviet Airforce during World War II, commonly referred to as the Great Patriotic War in the former Soviet Union. After she was shot down on 1 August 1943 she was posthumously awarded the Order of the Patriotic War 2nd class.

== Early life ==
Kashirina was born in the year 1920 in the village of Sergievka before moving to the village of Semenetskoe where she lived until she moved with her mother to Perovo on the outskirts of Moscow. Having dreamed of becoming a pilot from a young age she joined the Moscow Aeroclub where she graduated flight courses before the German invasion of the Soviet Union.

== Military career ==
After Germany invaded the Soviet Union Kashirina voluntarily joined the Soviet Air Force to serve in a women's aviation regiment founded by Marina Raskova. After graduating from Engels Military Aviation School she was deployed to the Southern Front in late May 1942 in the 588th Night Bomber Regiment as an aircraft mechanic, but she was eventually assigned to fly in squadron number one under the command of Serafima Amosova after passing navigation courses.

In August 1942 the regiment received orders to immediately relocate to a new airfield due to a German approach. A plane that she and a senior mechanic Sofiya Ozerkova were repairing was not airworthy due to serious issues with the engine, leaving them no choice but to burn the grounded airplane, forcing the both of them to walk on foot for three weeks until they arrived at a Soviet stronghold in Mozdok. During the three-week hike Kashirina had contracted typhus and was taken to a field hospital by Ozerkova after they arrived.

After recovering from typhus she completed her navigator's training to begin flying combat sorties. Yevdokiya Nosal offered to fly with her as pilot on her first night of bombing missions because as a more experienced pilot she would often fly with new crew members on their first night of bombing sorties. After several successful sorties that night the Po-2 piloted by Nosal was chased by a German fighter over Novorossiysk and attacked; a piece of shrapnel from a shell hit Nosal in the forehead, killing her instantly and causing her to slump over the controls when the plane went into a sharp dive. With partial loss of control due to damage inflicted on the plane by the attack, Kashirina managed to take control of the plane and land it by herself at the airfield where Nosal was immediately pronounced dead. For landing the plane with her pilot dead and damage to the controls Kashirina was awarded the Order of the Red Banner and Nosal was posthumously awarded the title Hero of the Soviet Union, becoming the first member of the regiment awarded the title and the first woman pilot awarded the title during the war.

When the 588th Night Bomber Regiment was awarded the Guards designation in 1943, Kashirina was one of the three service members to carry the Guards flag at the ceremony; Natalya Meklin was designated as the primary flag bearer with Yekaterina Titova and Kashirina as assistants.

Before her death she participated in bombing missions as navigator over Mius, Seversky Donets, and Don rivers and on the outskirts of Stavropol. On the night between 31 July and 1 August 1943, Kashirina's plane piloted by Valentina Polunina was one of the four Po-2s of the regiment shot down by Luftwaffe pilot Josef Kociok over the Kuban Bridgehead on the Taman Peninsula. All eight members of the regiment that were killed that night were buried in the mass grave of Russkoe village and posthumously awarded the Order of the Patriotic War 2nd Class.

== See also ==
- 46th Guards Night Bomber Aviation Regiment
- Yevdokiya Nosal
- Rufina Gasheva
- Vera Belik
