= Olga Sanfirova =

Soviet military aviator (1917–1944)

Olga Aleksandrovna Sanfirova
- Ольга Александровна Санфирова
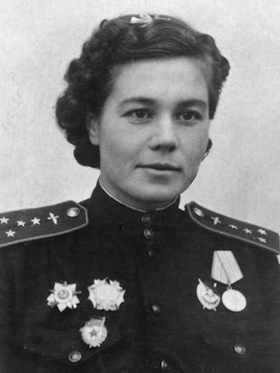
- Born: 2 May [O.S. 19 April] 1917; Samara, Russia
- Died: 13 December 1944 (aged 27); Pułtusk, Nazi-occupied Poland
- Military career
- Allegiance: Soviet Union
- Branch: Soviet Air Force
- Service years: 1941–1944
- Rank: Captain
- Unit: 46th Taman Guards Night Bomber Aviation Regiment
- Conflicts: World War II; Eastern Front
- Awards: Hero of the Soviet Union

Olga Aleksandrovna Sanfirova (Russian: Ольга Александровна Санфирова; 2 May [O.S. 19 April] 1917 – 13 December 1944) was a captain and squadron commander in the 46th Taman Guards Night Bomber Aviation Regiment during World War II. She was posthumously awarded the title of Hero of the Soviet Union on 23 February 1945, making her the first ethnic Tatar woman awarded the title.

== Civilian life ==
Sanfirova was born on 2 May [O.S. 19 April] 1917 to a working-class Volga Tatar family. She went to secondary school in the Uzbek SSR before she moved to Moscow to attend flight school in Kolomna. After graduating flight school she worked at the Department of Aviation in Moscow before transferring to Tatarsk, Novosibirsk in 1940 to train pilots of the 78th squadron of the West Siberia Civil Aviation Directorate. She enlisted in the military in December 1941 and was a member of the Communist Party of the Soviet Union since 1942.

== Military career ==
Sanfirova joined the Air Force at the encouragement of Marina Raskova. She trained at the Engels Military School of Aviation, and after graduating the Bataysk Military Aviation School in 1942 she joined the 588th Night Bomber Regiment (nicknamed the "Night Witches" by their German opponents), which was renamed the 46th Taman Guards Night Bomber Aviation Regiment in February 1943.

During a training flight at Engels where she was flying as pilot-in-command, the plane struck high-voltage power lines, damaging the aircraft. An Engels tribunal sentenced her to ten years imprisonment, but that ruling was later amended and she was asked to join the Night Bomber Regiment to atone for damaging the plane.

She rose up through the ranks from flight commander to deputy squadron commander before achieving the rank of squadron commander in 1943. During the war she participated in bombing campaigns against German forces in the North Caucasus, Crimea, the Taman Peninsula, Kerch-Eltigen, and Byelorussia.

On 1 May 1943, the Polikarpov Po-2 she and Rufina Gasheva were flying was shot down by a German fighter over Soviet lines in Crimea, but both of them managed to survive after evacuating the aircraft and were rescued two days later.

On 13 December 1944, the plane flown by Sanfirova and Gasheva was shot down again over a minefield. They did not always pack parachutes, in order to save weight, but on that mission, they had parachutes with them. Sanfirova parachuted out of the plane safely but was killed immediately when she landed and stepped on a mine. She was buried in a mass grave in the city of Grodno, Byelorussia. Gasheva survived the ordeal and continued to fly in combat after returning to the regiment.

Throughout the war she executed 630 night combat missions with 875 flight hours in combat, dropping 77 tons of bombs on enemy-controlled territory; destroying a warehouse, two Nazi platoons, five cars, three turrets, and two ferries as well as supplying Soviet land forces with 25 resupply drops of food and ammunition.

== Awards and honors ==
- Hero of the Soviet Union (23 February 1945)
- Order of Lenin (23 February 1945)
- Order of the Red Banner (27 April 1943)
- Order of Alexander Nevsky (24 April 1944)
- Order of the Patriotic War 1st class (22 October 1943)
- Medal "For the Defence of the Caucasus"

== Memorials ==
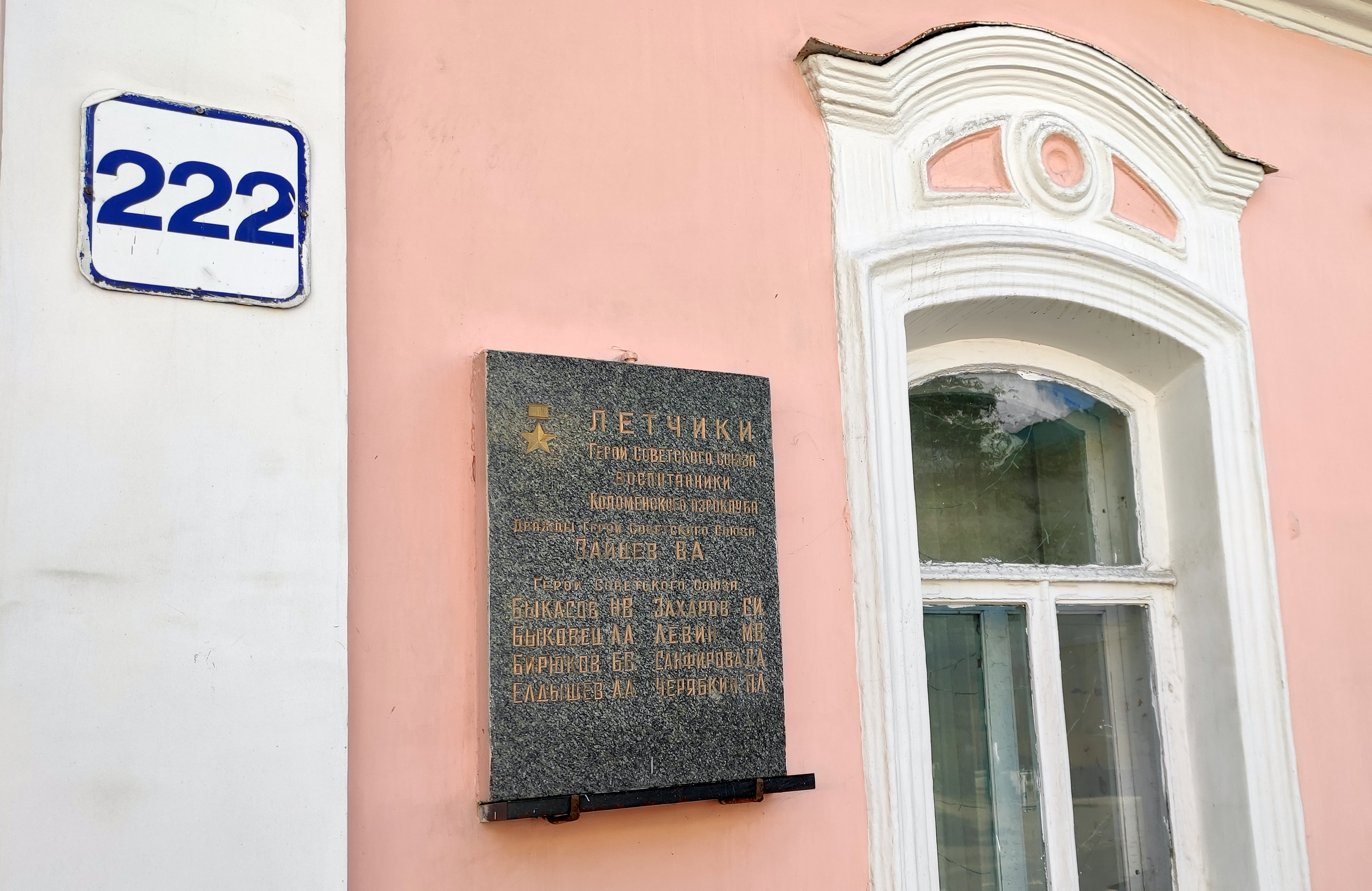
Commemorative plaque on the wall of 222 Oktyabrskaya Revolution Street in Kolomna in memory of Olga Sanfirova and other military aircraft pilots — Heroes of the Soviet Union associated with the Kolomna aeroclub (listed on the plate)

- There is a street bearing her name in Samara, as well as statues of her in Kolomna, in Grodno, and in Samara.

== See also ==
- List of female Heroes of the Soviet Union
- Tatyana Makarova
- Yevdokiya Nosal
