= Vera Belik =

Soviet flight navigator and Air Forces lieutenant (1921–1944)

Vera Lukianovna Belik
- Віра Лук'янівна Білик
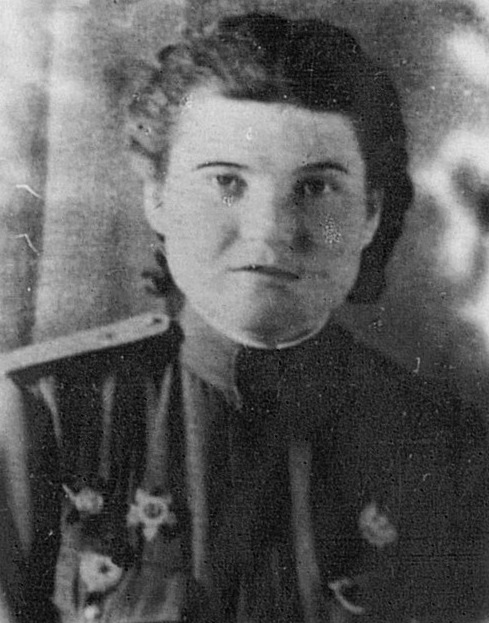
- Born: 12 June 1921; Ohrimovka, Zaporizhzhia Oblast, Ukraine SSR, Soviet Union
- Died: 25 August 1944 (aged 23) near Ostrołęka, Poland
- Military career
- Allegiance: Soviet Union
- Branch: Soviet Air Force
- Service years: 1941–1944
- Rank: Guard Senior Lieutenant
- Unit: 46th Taman Guards Night Bomber Aviation Regiment
- Conflicts: World War II; Eastern Front †
- Awards: Hero of the Soviet Union

Vera Lukianovna Belik (Russian: Вера Лукьяновна Белик, Ukrainian: Віра Лук'янівна Білик; 12 June 1921 – 25 August 1944) was a flight navigator and lieutenant in the 46th Taman Guards Night Bomber Aviation Regiment who frequently flew with pilot Tatyana Makarova. She died when her Po-2 was shot down by a German fighter after completing a bombing mission; she was posthumously awarded the title Hero of the Soviet Union on 23 February 1945.

== Early life ==
Belik was born in Ohrimovka (Ukrainian: Охрімівка) on 12 June 1921 to a Ukrainian family and was the oldest of six children; her father was a master electrician. For most of her childhood she lived in Kerch, Crimea where she graduated from secondary school in 1939 before she enrolled at the Karl Liebknecht Pedagogical Institute in Moscow, where she studied mathematics.

== Military career ==
Before entering the military in October 1941, Belik participated in the construction of defenses such as anti-tank ditches. After joining the women's aviation unit founded by Marina Raskova, she began navigation training at Engels Military Aviation school. Before the war, the navigation courses lasted three years, but due to the state of the war at the time, it only lasted six months. In May 1942 she was deployed to the front with the 588th Night Bomber Regiment, which was to the later redesignated the 46th Guards Regiment in 1943. She worked closely with Tatyana Makarova, who served as pilot of the Po-2 they flew while she navigated. In December 1942, the regiment was expanded and Belik was promoted to navigator of the second squadron, of which Makarova became commander.

However, after Josef Kociok shot down four planes from the squadron overnight, 31 July-1 August, Makarova requested demotion back to flight commander, and Belik chose to request demotion too in order to stay with her friend. She flew in difficult sorties over Ukraine, the Kuban area of the North Caucasus, the Crimea, Belorussia, and Poland. On 1 August 1944, she and Makarova flew the first bombing mission over East Prussia, becoming the first aircrew of the regiment to fight over German soil.

On the night of 25 August 1944 on her 813th sortie, the plane Belik and Makarova were flying was attacked by a German fighter over Ostrołęka, Poland, killing both of them after it caught fire and crashed. In her 813 sorties she had dropped 106 tons of explosives over enemy controlled territory, caused 156 major explosions and 143 fires, destroyed two searchlights, two ammunition depots, three enemy crossings, three ground-based anti-aircraft guns, and over two platoons of enemy infantry personnel. For her combat operations she was nominated for the title Hero of the Soviet Union and posthumously awarded the title on 23 February 1945, the same day as her pilot Makarova.

== Awards and honors ==
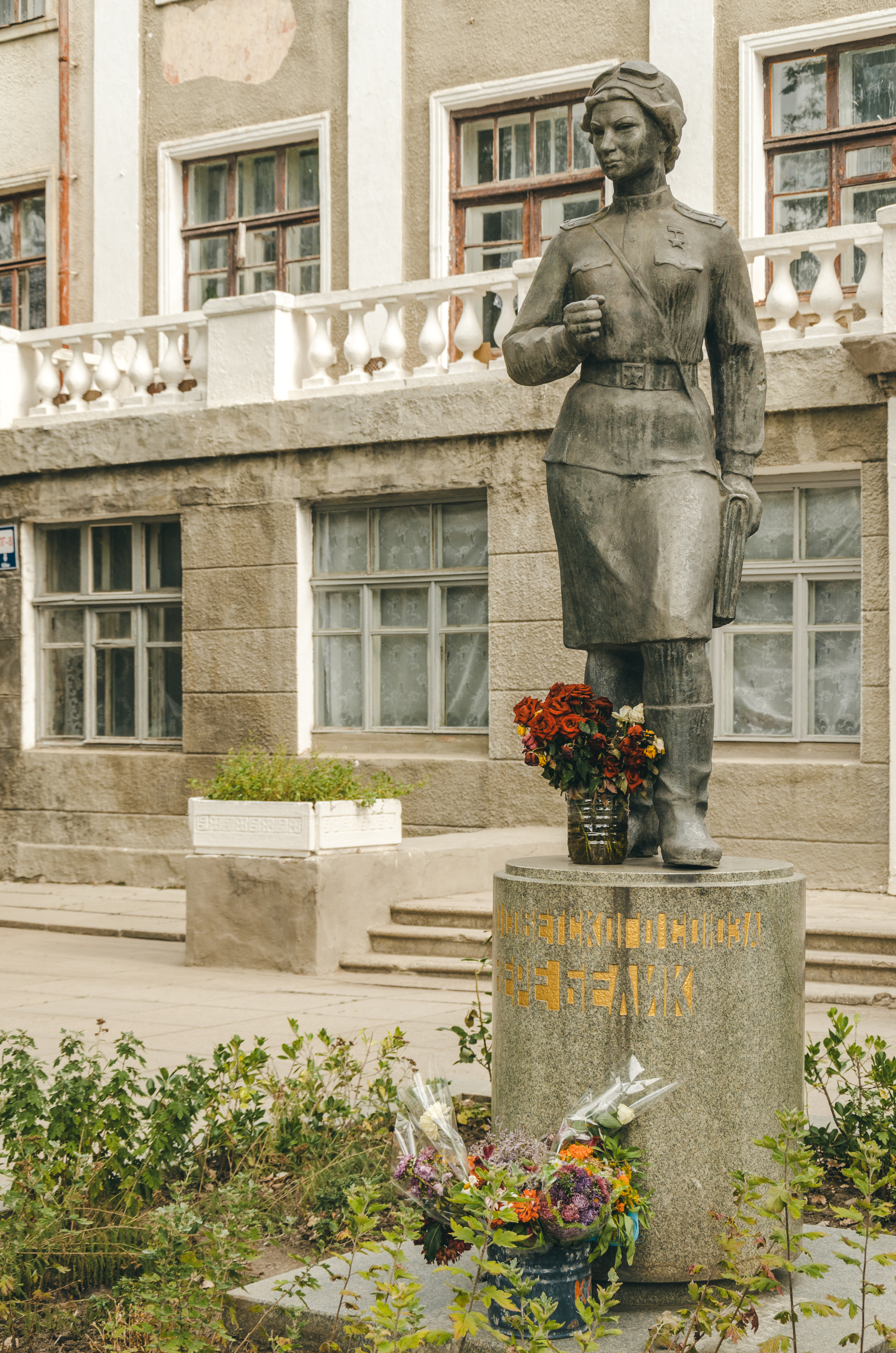
Monument to Vera Belik in Kerch, Crimea

Awards

- Hero of the Soviet Union (23 February 1945)
- Order of Lenin (23 February 1945)
- Order of the Red Banner (25 October 1943)
- Order of the Patriotic War 1st Class (14 April 1944)
- Order of the Red Star (9 September 1942)

Memorials and dedications

- A 1981 Soviet envelope from a series of covers with portraits of people awarded Hero of the Soviet Union featured Belik and Makarova.
- A statue in Kerch, Crimea (pictured) stands as memorial to Belik.
- The lobby of the Moscow State Pedagogical Institute where she studied contains a memorial to her.
- Ohrimovka, Ukraine contains a school and street named after her.
- School No.17 in Kerch was renamed in her honor.

== See also ==
- List of female Heroes of the Soviet Union
- Rufina Gasheva – another navigator from the regiment; she survived being shot down multiple times
