= Ekaterina Ryabova =

Ekaterina or Yekaterina Ryabova (Russian: Екатерина Рябова) may refer to:

- Ekaterina Ryabova (singer) (born 1997), Russian singer
- Ekaterina Ryabova (figure skater) (born 2003), Russian-Azerbaijani figure skater
- Yekaterina Ryabova (1921–1974), Soviet aviator
