= Yevdokiya Nosal =

Soviet pilot (1918–1943)

Yevdokiya Ivanovna Nosal
- Євдокія Іванівна Носаль
- Born: 14 March 1918; Burchak, Mykhailivka Raion, Zaporizhia Oblast, Ukrainian People's Republic
- Died: 23 April 1943 (age 25); Novorossiysk, Krasnodar Krai, Soviet Union
- Military career
- Allegiance: Soviet Union
- Branch: Soviet Air Force
- Service years: 1941–1943
- Rank: Junior Lieutenant
- Unit: 588th Night Bomber Regiment
- Conflicts: World War II; Eastern Front †
- Awards: Hero of the Soviet Union

Yevdokiya Ivanovna Nosal (Russian: Евдокия Ивановна Носаль, Ukrainian: Євдокія Іванівна Носаль; 14 March 1918 – 23 April 1943) was a junior lieutenant and deputy squadron commander in the 588th Night Bomber Regiment (nicknamed the "Night Witches" by the Germans) during World War II. She was posthumously awarded the title Hero of the Soviet Union on 24 May 1943, making her the first woman pilot to be honored with the title during the war.

== Civilian life ==
Nosal was born on 13 March 1918 to a Ukrainian peasant family in the village of Burchak in the Ukrainian People's Republic, which resides in present-day Ukraine. She worked as a teacher in Mykolayiv before she graduated in 1940 from the aviation club in Kherson. After graduating flight school she worked as a flight instructor in Nikolaev. Before joining the military in October 1941, her newborn son was killed in a bombing on a hospital.

== Military career ==
Nosal joined the military in October 1941 once Marina Raskova began recruiting women to the newly-formed women's aviation regiments. After completing training at Engels Military Aviation School she was sent to the Southern front with the 588th Night Bomber Regiment, which was later honored with the guards designation and made the 46th "Taman" Guards Night Bomber Regiment. Starting out as a regular pilot with the rank of sergeant, she quickly became promoted to flight commander and then deputy squadron commander. With a goal of flying 1,000 missions, she was noted for flying more than any other pilot, and volunteered to fly on dangerous missions.

After taking off in the middle of the night on 22 April 1943 and bombing a target, the Polikarpov Po-2 Nosal was piloting was followed by a German fighter and attacked by heavy anti-aircraft fire and shelling. One explosive entered the cockpit of the Po-2 and shrapnel hit Nosal in the temple, killing her instantly. Her navigator, Glafira Kashirina, managed to take over the controls and land the plane safely at the destination airfield. By the time of her death she had flown 354 sorties despite being on the front for less than a year. During her time in combat, Nidal had dropped 48 tons of bombs, destroying a train and three crossings in addition to numerous fires and explosions.

== Awards and honors ==
- Hero of the Soviet Union (24 May 1943)
- Order of Lenin (24 May 1943)
- Order of the Red Banner (30 December 1942)
- Order of the Red Star (9 September 1942)

== See also ==
- List of female Heroes of the Soviet Union
- Marina Raskova
