= Rufina Gasheva =

Rufina Sergeyevna Gasheva
- Руфина Сергеевна Гашева
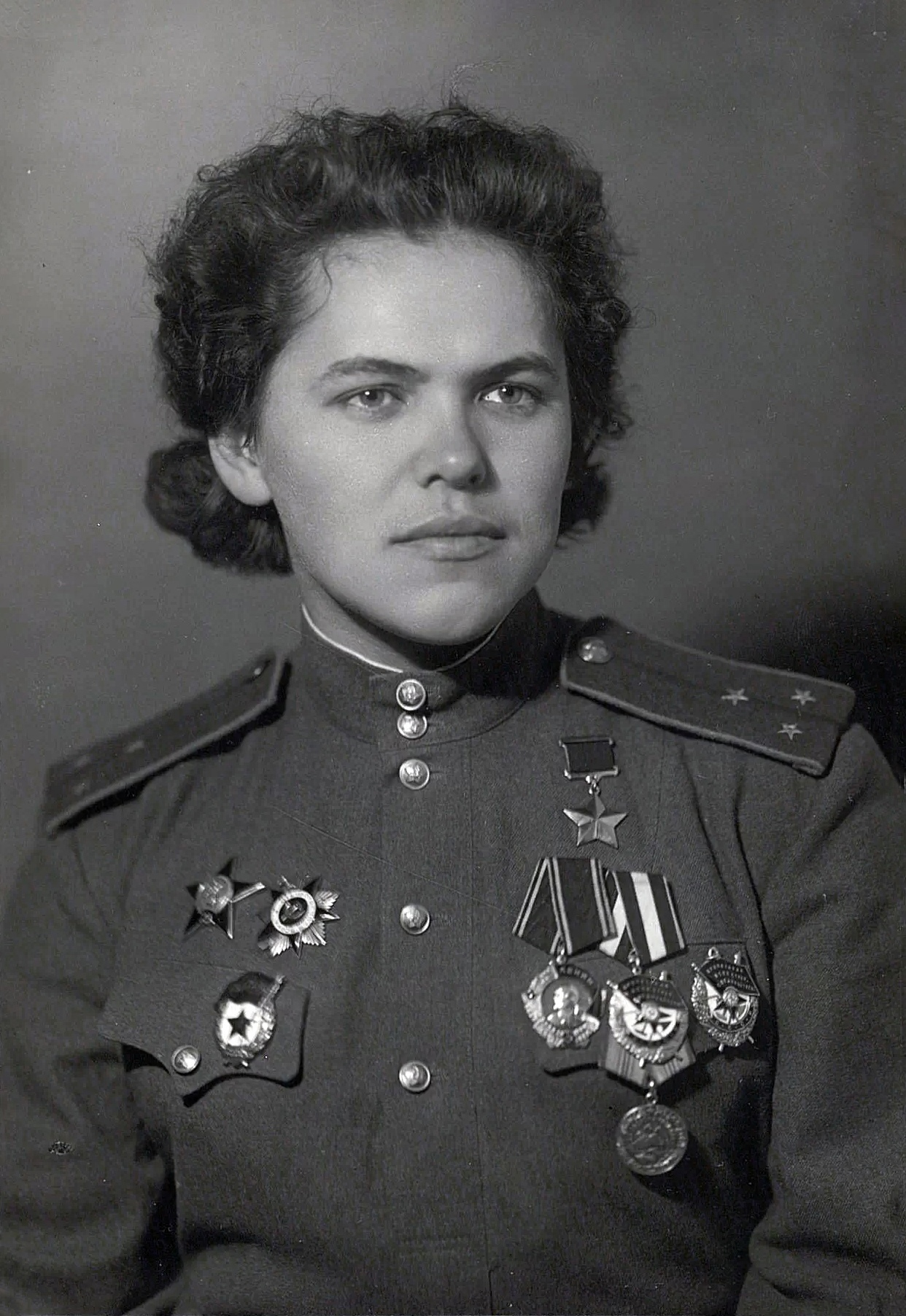
- Born: 14 October 1921; Verkhnechusovsky Gorodky, Russia
- Died: 1 May 2012 (aged 90); Moscow, Russia
- Military career
- Allegiance: Soviet Union
- Branch: Soviet Air Force
- Service years: 1941–1956
- Rank: Lieutenant Colonel
- Unit: 46th Guards Night Bomber Regiment
- Conflicts: World War II
- Awards: Hero of the Soviet Union
- Other work: Educator

Rufina Sergeyevna Gasheva (Russian: Руфина Сергеевна Гашева; 14 October 1921 – 1 May 2012) was a Soviet Polikarpov Po-2 navigator during World War II who served with the all-female 588th Night Bomber Regiment and recipient of the title of Hero of the Soviet Union. Postwar, she continued to serve and was a lecturer in foreign languages at the Malinovsky Military Armored Forces Academy before her retirement. After retiring, Gasheva worked in the Bureau of Foreign Military Literature at Voenizdat.

== Early life ==
Gasheva was born on 14 October 1921 in the village of Verkhnechusovsky Gorodky in Permsky Uyezd, part of the Perm Governorate. She soon moved to the village of Vasilyevo, living there until 1927. Between 1927 and 1928 she lived in the village of Kasimovo in what is now Permsky District. Gasheva lived in Perm for the next two years, before moving to Moscow in 1930. In 1939, she graduated from high school, and by the summer of 1941, she completed two years at the Moscow State University of Mechanics and Mathematics.

== World War II ==
Gasheva volunteered for service in September 1941. She graduated from a navigators' course at the Engels Military Aviation School of Pilots in February 1942. Gasheva was posted to the all-female 588th Night Bomber Regiment of the Red Air Force, then forming in Engels. She fought in combat from May 1942, fighting in the Battle of the Caucasus. In February 1943 the regiment became the 46th Guards Bomber Aviation Regiment. Gasheva fought in the Air Battles in the Kuban, the Kerch–Eltigen operation, the Crimean offensive, the Mogilev offensive, the Belostok offensive, the Osovets offensive, the Mlawa-Elbing offensive, the East Pomeranian offensive, and the Battle of Berlin. Gasheva's aircraft was shot down twice. On the first occasion, Gasheva and her pilot reached Soviet lines, but on the second they bailed over minefields and pilot Olga Sanfirova was killed when she stepped on an anti-personnel mine. During that incident, Gasheva landed on an anti-tank minefield several hundred meters to the South of Sanfirova; after making it back to her regiment she began flying with Nadezhda Popova. By the end of the war she flew 848 combat missions as a navigator of the Po-2 light bomber; after accumulating 823 sorties by December 1944 she was nominated for the title Hero of the Soviet Union, which she received on 23 February 1945. Gasheva ended the war as a senior lieutenant. She married bomber pilot Mikhail Plyats at the front.

== Postwar ==
Gasheva served with the regiment in the Northern Group of Forces until October 1945. Postwar, Gasheva and Pliats had a son, Vladimir, and a daughter, Marina. Pliats reached the rank of colonel. In 1952, Gasheva graduated from the Military Institute of Foreign Languages, becoming a senior lecturer at the Foreign Languages Department of the Malinovsky Military Armored Forces Academy. She worked there until August 1957. She transferred to the reserve in December 1956 with the rank of major. From 1961, she worked as a senior editor in the Voenizdat Bureau of Foreign Military Literature, and between 1967 and 1972, she was a senior editor in the Office for Publication of Military Literature in Foreign Languages of the USSR Ministry of Defense. She lived in Moscow and was promoted to lieutenant colonel in 2000, before she died on 1 May 2012; she was buried in the Vostryakovsky Cemetery.

== Awards ==
- Hero of the Soviet Union (23 February 1945)
- Order of Lenin (23 February 1945)
- Two Orders of the Red Banner (25 October 1943 and 14 December 1944)
- Two Orders of the Patriotic War 1st class (26 April 1944 and 11 March 1985)
- Two Orders of the Red Star (30 November 1942 and 30 December 1956)
- Medal "For Battle Merit" (19 November 1951)
- campaign and jubilee medals

== See also ==
- List of female Heroes of the Soviet Union
- Night Witches
- Olga Sanfirova
