= 892nd Helicopter Reconnaissance and Liaison Squadron =

892nd Helicopter Reconnaissance and Liaison Squadron: 892. helikopterska eskadrila za izviđanje i vezu
- Active: 1952 – 1966; 1980 - 1988
- Disbanded: 1966; 1988
- Country: Yugoslavia
- Branch: Yugoslav Air Force
- Type: Squadron
- Role: Liaison
- Part of: 7th Army
- Garrison/HQ: Rajlovac

The 892nd Helicopter Reconnaissance and Liaison Squadron (Serbo-Croatian: 892. helikopterska eskadrila za izviđanje i vezu / 892. хеликоптерска ескадрила за извиђање и везу) was an aviation squadron of the Yugoslav Air Force formed in 1952 at Rajlovac airfield as the Liaison Squadron of 7th Military district (Serbo-Croatian: Eskadrila za vezu 7. vojne oblasti / Ескадрила за везу 7. војне области).

== History ==
The squadron was formed by order from December 17, 1951, on February 1, 1952, as part of the 7th Military district. It was equipped with various training and liaison aircraft. The squadron was transformed into the Liaison Squadron of 7th Air Command (Serbo-Croatian: Eskadrila za vezu 7. vazduhoplovne komande / Ескадрила за везу 7. ваздухопловне команде) by 1959.

After April 1961 and the Drvar reorganization of the air force, a new type of designation system began to be used to identify squadrons; under this system, the Liaison Squadron of 7th Air Command became the 892nd Liaison Aviation Squadron.

It was equipped with domestic liaison Ikarus Kurir aircraft. When the 7th Air Command was disbanded in 1964, the squadron was reattached to the 7th Military district. The squadron was disbanded on July 17, 1966, by order from February 17 of same year, but its numeration remained in reserve.

By order from January 9, 1980, the 892nd Helicopter Flight (Serbo-Croatian: 892. helikoptersko odeljenje / 892. хеликоптерско одељење) has been established at Sarajevo military airfield with the 7th Army of the Yugoslav People's Army for reconnaissance and liaison duties equipped with domestic-made SOKO SA 341 Gazelle helicopters. By order from March 1, 1985, it was designated as the 892nd Helicopter Reconnaissance and Liaison Squadron. Due to the 1988 reorganization of the field armies of the Yugoslav People's Army, the 893rd Squadron was attached to the 896th Helicopter Reconnaissance and Liaison Squadron as its helicopter flight.

== Assignments ==
- 7th Military district (1952–1959)
- 7th Air Command (1959–1964)
- 7th Military district (1964-1966)
- 7th Army (1980-1988)

== Previous designations ==
- Liaison Squadron of 7th Military district (1952–1959)
- Liaison Squadron of 7th Air Command (1959–1961)
- 892nd Liaison Aviation Squadron (1961-1965)
- 892nd Helicopter Flight (1980-1985)
- 892nd Helicopter Reconnaissance and Liaison Squadron (1985-1988)

== Equipment ==
- Polikarpov Po-2 (1952-1959)
- Zlin 381 (1952-1959)
- Kaproni Bulgarski KB-11 Fazan (1952-1959)
- Utva Aero-3 (1959-1961)
- Ikarus Kurir (1955-1965)
- Soko SA.341 Gazelle (1980–1988)
