= Vera Tikhomirova =

Soviet deputy squadron commander

- Вера Ивановна Тихомирова
- Born: 30 September 1918; Shuya, RSFSR
- Died: 14 October 2002 (aged 84)
- Military career
- Allegiance: Soviet Union
- Branch: Soviet Air Force
- Service years: 1942–1959
- Rank: Major
- Unit: 46th Guards Night Bomber Aviation Regiment
- Conflicts: World War II
- Awards: Order of the Red Banner; Order of Alexander Nevsky

Vera Ivanovna Tikhomirova (Russian: Вера Ивановна Тихомирова; 30 September 1918 – 14 October 2002) was a deputy squadron commander in the 46th Guards Night Bomber Aviation Regiment (dubbed the "Night Witches") and one of nine women awarded the Order of Alexander Nevsky.

== Early life ==
Tikhomirova was born in 1918 to the family of a blacksmith. After completing her seventh grade of school she attended trade school before working at a textile factory. Originally she dreamed of becoming a ballerina, but after seeing an issue of Smena magazine featuring women pilots she dreamt of becoming one. While employed at the factory she attended a local glider school, which helped her secure admission into a flight academy. After graduating from the Bataisk First Red Banner School of the Civil Air Fleet named after Baranov she became certified as a 4th class civil air fleet pilot and was assigned to a job based in Odessa delivering airmail.

== World War II ==
Upon the German invasion of the Soviet Union she initially worked as a flight instructor, and due to advancing enemy troops the schools she trained future combat pilots at had to be evacuated to Starobelsk and later Omsk. It was not until February 1942 that she was drafted into active duty in the military, and only in April that she became a member of what was then the 588th Night Bomber Aviation Regiment, resulting in her missing the additional training given to recruits at Engels Military Aviation School. However, since she was already an experienced pilot, she excelled in the unit, and was tasked with flying missions for headquarters as soon as she arrived. After the regiment was deployed to the Southern Front she began flying sorties on the front lines, but initially did not engage in combat missions, sticking with communications work. In August 1942 she participated in a reconnaissance mission on behalf of division headquarters, and in December that year she made her first night bombing mission as part of Marina Chechneva's training squadron; during that flight she flew with navigator Tatyana Sumarokova, who she later flew with regularly after being promoted. In the middle of the war she flew many combat sorties with Lidiya Loshmanova as her navigator. During one of her missions with Loshamnova in August 1943, one of the bombs they attempted to drop failed to release; fearing the shame of returning without dropping their payload and the danger posed by the remaining bomb, Tikhomirova managed to fly the plane steadily so her navigator could climb onto the wing and detach the bomb, but to no avail, it remained stuck, forcing them to return to the airfield with the unexploded ordnance and make an emergency landing. Eventually the bomb fell off their plane while landing, allowing for Serafima Amosova to forbid other aircraft to land there and order soldiers to defuse the bomb. Tikhomirova went on to fly in various successful missions, taking out an anti-aircraft point, conducting 35 resupply flights to troops in the Kerch-Eltigen landing, and successfully landing her plane even after it was hit by enemy fire on multiple occasions. When she and Parfyonova piloted reconnaissance flights over Bagerovo, Kerch, they were hit with blinding searchlights as the anti-aircraft guns on the ground opened fire on them; while returning she saw her oil pressure gauge plummet, but managed to bring her plane back safely, having lost an oil filter and cylinder in her engine due to shrapnel. On the very next flight, her plane was hit by anti-aircraft fire again, and the damage was severe enough to light the plane on fire; after trying to maneuver her way out of further enemy fire to no avail she was left with having to make a sharp dive before regaining altitude and turning around to drop the bombload to confuse the enemy forces on the ground into thinking they had shot her down. Once the bombs dropped, she and her navigator Sumarokova addressed the flames; at one point Tikhomirova considered ditching the stricken plane in the sea to extinguish the flames and avoid capture by the Nazis, but eventually they were able to get the situation under control by extinguishing the flames and making an emergency landing in the Chushka straight. After retaking Crimea the regiment was transferred to Poland, where Tikhomirova had to end her combat career for medical reasons after falling seriously ill in autumn 1944. Having been promoted to deputy squadron commander before the battles for Crimea, she was nominated for the Order of Alexander Nevsky, which she was awarded on 26 April 1944. During the war she flew an estimated 900 sorties on the Po-2, around 530 of which were night combat sorties.

== Postwar ==
After a lengthy stay in a hospital in Moscow, Tikhomirova eventually resumed her aviation career in 1949 and became a Li-2 co-pilot, and several years later she was promoted to captain and held a pilot-in-command role on her flight routes. In 1955 she became certified to fly the Il-14, the most advanced passenger plane in the Soviet Union at the time, and in 1957 she became certified as a 1st class pilot. After working in aviation for over two decades she retired from the military in 1959 with the rank of major. Having resided in Lyubertsy and Moscow, she died on 14 October 2002.

== Awards ==
- Order of the Red Banner
- Order of Alexander Nevsky
- Two Order of the Patriotic War 2nd class
- Order of the Red Star
- campaign and jubilee medals
