= 896th Helicopter Reconnaissance and Liaison Squadron =

896th Helicopter Reconnaissance and Liaison Squadron: 896. helikopterska eskadrila za izviđanje i vezu
- Active: 1981–1992
- Disbanded: 1992
- Country: Yugoslavia
- Branch: Yugoslav Air Force
- Type: Squadron
- Role: Liaison
- Part of: 1st Army
- Garrison/HQ: Batajnica
- Engagements: Yugoslav wars

The 896th Helicopter Reconnaissance and Liaison Squadron (Serbo-Croatian: 896. helikopterska eskadrila za izviđanje i vezu / 896. хеликоптерска ескадрила за извиђање и везу) was an aviation squadron of Yugoslav Air Force formed in 1981 at Batajnica air base 896th Helicopter Flight (Serbo-Croatian: 896. helikoptersko odeljenje / 896. хеликоптерско одељење).

The helicopter flight was formed by order from August 18, 1981, with the 1st Army of Yugoslav People's Army for reconnaissance and liaison duties equipped with domestically made Soko SA,341 Gazelle helicopters. By order from March 1, 1985, it is designated as 896th Helicopter Reconnaissance and Liaison Squadron. Due to the 1988 reorganization of field armies of the Yugoslav People's Army, the 896th Squadron has been strengthened for one flight at Rajlovci airport (former 892nd Helicopter Reconnaissance and Liaison Squadron).

The squadron took part in early combat operations in the Croatian war and war in Bosnia and Herzegovina during 1991 and 1992. It was disbanded in 1992, and its personnel and equipment were transferred to 890th Transport Helicopter Squadron. The flight at Rajlovci airport has joined Republika Srpska Air Force, being merged to its 711st Anti-Armored Helicopter Squadron.

== Assignments ==
- Naval Military District (1981–1991)

== Previous designations ==
- 896th Helicopter Flight (1981–1985)
- 896th Helicopter Reconnaissance and Liaison Squadron (1985–1992)

== Equipment ==
- Soko SA.341 Gazelle Hera (1981–1991)
