= Tatyana Makarova =

Soviet World War II flight commander

Tatyana Petrovna Makarova
- Татьяна Петровна Макарова
- Makarova in the 1940s
- Born: 25 September 1920; Moscow, Russian SFSR
- Died: 25 August 1944 (aged 23); Ostrołęka, Warsaw, Nazi-occupied Poland
- Military career
- Allegiance: Soviet Union
- Branch: Soviet Air Force
- Service years: 1941–1944
- Rank: Lieutenant
- Unit: 46th Taman Guards Night Bomber Aviation Regiment
- Conflicts: World War II; Eastern Front †
- Awards: Hero of the Soviet Union

Tatyana Petrovna Makarova (Russian: Татьяна Петровна Макарова; 25 September 1920 – 25 August 1944) was a flight commander in the 46th Taman Guards Night Bomber Aviation Regiment, one of the three women's aviation regiments founded by Marina Raskova. She and her navigator Vera Belik were posthumously awarded the title Hero of the Soviet Union after their plane was shot down by the Axis forces over Nazi-occupied Poland.

== Civilian life ==
Makarova was born on 25 November 1920 to a working-class Russian family in Moscow; her father was a postal worker who had been injured during World War I, and her mother was illiterate. After completing seven years of schooling in 1935, she began working at a confectionery factory. After completing basic training at a local aeroclub she tried to enter a military academy, but was rejected because women were not allowed to attend. She continued to pursue aviation and in 1939 she graduated from vocational school; that year she completed her flight courses. In 1940 she gained the rank of sergeant and became a flight instructor at the aeroclub she had trained at.

== Military career ==
Less than a month after the creation of the women's aviation unit by Marina Raskova in early October 1941, Makarova volunteered to join and was accepted in. After graduating from the Engels Military School of Aviation she was deployed to the warfront in May 1942 as a flight commander in the 588th Night Bomber Regiment, which was eventually honored with the Guards designation in 1943 and renamed to the 46th Guards Night Bomber Regiment. On 19 October 1942 she was awarded the Order of the Red Banner for completing 195 missions. Previously, she had managed to land her plane after it was targeted by a barrage of anti-aircraft fire and searchlights; after losing control temporarily she managed to distract German forces by releasing another bomb, providing enough time to leave the area and land.

In 1943 she was promoted to the position of squadron commander after the regiment decided to add a third squadron, but after eight members of her squadron were shot down over Kuban in one night, she blamed herself and requested to be demoted back to flight commander, which was accepted. Her friend Vera Belik, who was inseparable from her, also requested demotion from squadron navigator to flight navigator in order to remain in her crew. The chief of staff, Irina Rakobolskaya, described Makarova as being too light with her duties and criticized her for not being strict as her counterpart Mariya Smirnova. However, Olga Golubeva-Teres, who flew under her command, described her as a good flight commander.

To improve the accuracy of her attacks, Makarova would often fly down to 100–150 meters before dropping the bombs. Before her death in combat she and Vera Belik became the first crew from their regiment to bomb German territory; in that mission, they dropped their bombs in East Prussia. During the war participated in bombing campaigns in against German forces in the North Caucasus, Crimea, Kuban, Taman peninsula, Byelorussia and East Prussia.

Her last mission took place over Ostroleka on 25 August 1944; as usual, she flew with Vera Belik. They managed to drop a bomb on the target but the enemy spotted their aircraft, having triggered searchlights and anti-aircraft fire. A fighter followed their aircraft as they were returning to their airfield and shot their plane down over Soviet-controlled territory. Due to the heavy payload the plane had to carry for night bombings, neither Makarova nor Belik had a parachute and the two perished in the burning plane. In total she flew 628 sorties, during which she dropped 96 tons of bombs, resulting in the destruction of two ferries, two anti-aircraft guns, one searchlight, two ammunition depots, and killing more than two platoons of enemy soldiers.

== Awards and honors ==
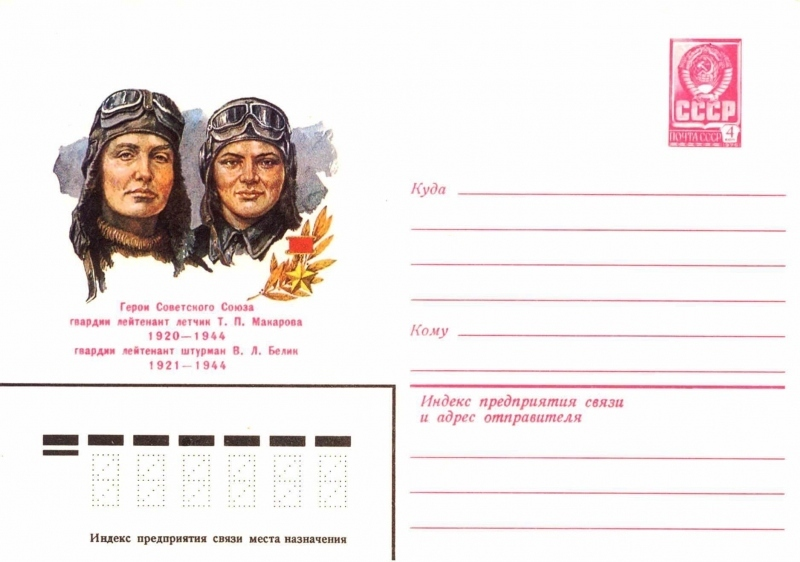
Soviet envelope featuring Makarova and Belik

- Hero of the Soviet Union (23 February 1945)
- Order of Lenin (23 February 1945)
- Two Order of the Red Banner (19 October 1942 and 30 July 1944)
- Order of the Patriotic War 1st class (25 October 1943)

To honor her memory there is a small museum in southern Moscow dedicated to her, a street in Moscow and school in Kerch named after her, a monument at the technical school where she studied, and an official envelope of the USSR bearing her portrait next to that of Vera Belik.

== See also ==
- List of female Heroes of the Soviet Union
- "Night Witches"
- Vera Belik
- Polikarpov Po-2
