= Sofiya Ozerkova =

Soviet air force officer

- Софья Ивановна Озеркова
- Ozerkova, 1945
- Born: 3 November 1912; Shuya, Russian Empire
- Died: Late 20th century Odesa, Ukrainian SSR, USSR
- Military career
- Allegiance: Soviet Union
- Branch: Soviet Air Force
- Service years: 1932–1947
- Rank: Captain
- Unit: 46th Guards Night Bomber Aviation Regiment
- Conflicts: World War II
- Awards: Order of the Red Banner

Sofiya Ivanovna Ozerkova (Russian: Софья Ивановна Озеркова; 3 November 1912 – late 20th century) was the senior regiment engineer and head of maintenance in the women's 46th Guards Night Bomber Aviation Regiment, dubbed the “Night Witches”.

== Early life ==
Ozerkova was born to a Russian family on 3 November 1912 in Shuya. Having joined the military in 1932, she graduated from 4th Irkutsk Military Aviation School of Aircraft Mechanics in 1933 with training as a mechanic, and subsequently worked at the school in the profession of a teacher until being sent to Saratov in late 1941 to join the women's aviation group founded by Marina Raskova.

== World War II ==
Upon her arrival at Engels Military Aviation School where members of the 588th Night Bomber Aviation Regiment (and other women's aviation regiments) trained at before being deployed to the front, Ozerkova began instructing her group of women mechanics, technical personnel, armorers, and other ground crew. Initially she was disliked by many of the mechanics and technicians for coming off as strict and hardened, having been a career officer and always gone by standard formalities to instill discipline in crews. But over time, the ground crews warmed up to her, growing to appreciate the necessity of the intense training she put them through.

In August 1942 the regiment was forced to hastily retreat from its airfield due to German tanks advancing. When the remainder of the regiment took off, Ozerkova, with fellow mechanic Glafira Kashirina and two pilots stayed behind until the last minute, waiting for repairs to be finished on one of the two remaining planes. Unable to complete the repairs due to a lack of spare parts, Ozerkova made the decision to destroy the Po-2 rather than let it fall into enemy hands, and set the grounded biplane on fire.

Meanwhile, because the four of them could not fit into the one plane left and with time running out, Ozerkova told the remaining pilots to depart in the other plane, leaving her and Kashirina behind to retreat on foot. At nightfall the two slept underneath haystacks in a field, where they were awoken by a sympathetic woman who gave them civilian clothes. They proceeded to walk for weeks to reach their regiment, at one point encountering German soldiers on motorcycles, one of whom attempted to search Kashirina's food pail concealing a pistol wrapped in a scarf at the bottom; however, Ozerkova's quick reflexes saved them when she immediately grabbed her pistol and shot the two German soldiers at close range before fleeing into nearby bushes. During the approximately three-week ordeal, Kashirina became very weak from typhus. Eventually they reunited with a contingent of Red Army soldiers in the area; and, locating the commandant, Ozerkova reported on her situation, then took Kashirina to the hospital before hitching a ride to her regiment in a car.

Upon her return to the regiment, she was warmly greeted by her comrades, especially the technicians she had previously trained. But the joy was short-lived; the military police suddenly forbade her from returning to her duties and insisted on summoning her for questioning, demanding to know how she avoided being surrounded and where her Communist Party membership card was—Ozerkova had been a member of the party since 1941, but for obvious reasons did not want to be identified as a party member if she was searched or captured by the Germans, so she destroyed the card. Despite the honesty of her answers, she was still subjected to a military tribunal and sentenced to death. Subsequently imprisoned, her shoulder straps indicating her officer rank were taken and her head was shaved. She refused suggestions that she write a request for a pardon, but was saved by clemency from the higher command after a review of her case had the charges dropped.

Ozerkova returned to her position as senior engineer and was reinstated as a member of the party. She went on to be awarded several high honors for her work during the war. In 1943 she received her first order, an Order of the Patriotic War. The same year, the regiment received the Guards designation and was renamed as the 46th Guards Night Bomber Aviation Regiment. However, Ozerkova remained forever emotionally scarred by her prosecution, fearing repercussions even later in life.

== Postwar ==
Demobilized from the military in 1947, she got married, settled on the outskirts of Odesa, and had three children.

== Awards ==
- Order of the Red Banner (1945)
- Two Order of the Patriotic War (1st class - 1945; 2nd class - 1943)
- Two Order of the Red Star (1944 and 1947)
- campaign and jubilee medals
