= Semyon Kharlamov =

Soviet Pilot

- Native name: Семён Ильич Харламов
- Born: 30 April 1921; Krasny Kut, Volga German ASSR, RSFSR
- Died: 5 May 1990 (aged 69) Zaporozhye, Ukrainian SSR, USSR
- Allegiance: Soviet Union
- Branch: Soviet Air Force
- Service years: 1939–1973
- Rank: General-colonel of Aviation
- Conflicts: World War II
- Awards: Hero of the Soviet Union
- Spouse: Nadezhda Popova

Semyon Ilyich Kharlamov (Russian: Семён Ильич Харламов; 30 April 1921 – 5 May 1990) was a reconnaissance and fighter pilot during World War II who was awarded the title Hero of the Soviet Union. He later went on to hold various command posts in the air force, and eventually reaching the rank of colonel-general. His wife, Nadezhda Popova, a squadron commander in the famed "Night Witches" whom he met at the warfront, was also a Hero of the Soviet Union.

== Early life ==
Kharlamov was born on 30 April 1921 to a working-class Russian family in Krasny Kut. Before entering the military in 1939 he completed his eighth grade of school in 1937. Initially enlisted in the army, he attended the Chkalovsk Infantry School in Orenburg before moving on to the Stalingrad Military Aviation School of Pilots, which he graduated from in 1942 before being deployed to the warfront as a pilot in the 821st Fighter Aviation Regiment.

== World War II ==
Originally deployed with the 821st Fighter Regiment in 1942, in December that year he transferred to the 249th Fighter Aviation Regiment as a senior pilot. There, he flew for the rest of the war and quickly rose through the ranks from senior pilot to squadron commander. As a skilled reconnaissance pilot, he discovered, radioed information about, and photographed positions of enemy forces before Soviet advances, having to fly past intense anti-aircraft artillery and enemy fighter cover to complete missions. In September 1943 during the battle for the Taman Peninsula he documented a convoy of 300 enemy vehicles and barges in the port, enabling attack aircraft to close in on the target. Later on in the war he documented enemy positions on the Kerch peninsula before gathering information about enemy defenses on various rivers in Eastern Europe. On 23 February 1945 he was awarded the title Hero of the Soviet Union for his accomplishments. Throughout the war he piloted the Yak-1, LaGG-3, and La-5 fighters, totaled 575 sorties, 419 of which were reconnaissance missions, tallying four solo and two shared shootdowns of enemy aircraft over the course of 85 aerial engagements.

== Postwar ==
After the end of the war he married fellow military pilot Nadezhda Popova, whom he met during the war and had received the title Hero of the Soviet Union on the same day as him. A regimental commander until 1950, he went on to attend the Air Force Academy in Monino, where he graduated in 1955. From then to 1957 he was an adviser to a fighter aviation division, and from then until 1959 he was a division commander. He then went on to attend the Militar Academy of General Staff, graduating in 1961. From 1961 to 1964 he served as deputy commander of combat training in the 24th Air Army, which he later became the deputy commander of after holding the same post in the 26th Air Army from 1964 to early 1967. From 1967 to 1971 he served as commander of the 36th Air Army, based in Hungary, and from May 1971 to May 1972 he served as an adviser to the Egyptian Air Force. He then returned to the Soviet Union, where he served as deputy chairman of the aviation committee and later the central committee of the DOSAAF before retiring from the military in 1988 with the rank of colonel-general. Living out the rest of his life in Moscow, he chaired the Federation of Aviation Sports of the USSR since 1987. He died on 5 May 1990 and was buried in the Novodevichy cemetery.

== Awards ==
- Hero of the Soviet Union
- Honoured Military Pilot of the USSR
- FAI Gold Air Medal
- Order of Lenin
- Order of the October Revolution
- Five Order of the Red Banner
- Order of Alexander Nevsky
- Order of the Patriotic War 1st and 2nd class
- Two Order of the Red Star
- campaign and jubilee medals
