= 7th Air Reconnaissance Regiment =

7th Air Reconnaissance Regiment: 7. puk VOJIN
- Active: 1955 - 1964
- Disbanded: 1964
- Country: Yugoslavia
- Branch: Yugoslav Air Force
- Size: 1 battalion
- Part of: 7th Air Command
- Command: Sarajevo

The 7th Air Reconnaissance Regiment (Serbo-Croatian: 7. puk VOJIN / 7. пук ВОЈИН) was an air reconnaissance and guidance regiment established in 1955 as 137th Air Reconnaissance Regiment, part of the SFR Yugoslav Air Force.

== History ==
The 137th Air Reconnaissance Regiment was established on June 8, 1955, from 107th Air Reconnaissance Battalion with command at Sarajevo. Meanwhile, until end of 1950's it was not completely developed as regiment, so it was mentioned as 137th Air Reconnaissance Battalion ore 1st Battalion of 137th Air Reconnaissance Regiment. With "Drvar" reorganization plan in 1959, regiment was redesignated in to 7th Air Reconnaissance Regiment. It was disbanded by the "Drvar-2" reorganization plan in 1964.

== Assignments ==
- 7th Air Command (1959–1964)

== Previous designations ==
- 137th Air Reconnaissance Regiment (1955–1959)
- 7th Air Reconnaissance Regiment (1959–1964)

== Commanding officers ==
- Colonel Slobodan Ilić
