= 7th Air Command =

7th Air Command: 7. vazduhoplovna komanda
- Active: 1959–1964
- Disbanded: 1964
- Country: Yugoslavia
- Branch: Yugoslav Air Force
- Type: Division
- Size: 2 regiments
- HQ: Rajlovac

The 7th Air Command (Serbo-Croatian: 7. vazduhoplovna komanda/ 7. ваздухопловна команда) was a joint unit of Yugoslav Air Force.

== History ==
It was established by the order from June 27, 1959, per the "Drvar" reorganization plan of Yugoslav Air Force from the command of 37th Aviation Division with command at Rajlovac. In 1961 it suffered a changes in the organization.

By the new "Drvar 2" reorganization plan of Yugoslav Air Force, on May 2, 1964, 7th Air Command has been disbanded. Its units were attached to 1st Aviation Corps. The commanders of Air command was Svetozar Radojević.

== Organization ==
=== 1959-1961 ===
- 7th Air Command
    - 207th Signal Battalion
    - Liaison Squadron of 7th Air Command
    - Light Combat Aviation Squadron of 7th Air Command
  - 7th Air Reconnaissance Regiment
  - 103rd Reconnaissance Aviation Regiment (1960)
  - 399th Air Base

=== 1961-1964 ===
- 7th Air Command
    - 463rd Light Combat Aviation Squadron
    - 892nd Liaison Aviation Squadron
  - 7th Air Reconnaissance Regiment
  - 103rd Reconnaissance Aviation Regiment
  - 399th Air Base

== Headquarters ==
- Rajlovac

== Commanding officers ==
- Colonel Svetozar Radojević
