= FAB-50 =

Series of Soviet and Russian aerial bombs

The FAB-50 (fugasnaya aviatsionnaya bomba, фугасная авиационная бомба, ФAБ-50) is a series of unguided general purpose Soviet and Russian aerial bombs created before and during World War II. The FAB-50 series was widely used by the VVS during World War II. They consisted of both conventional bombs and modified artillery shells. The earliest models weighed 49.67 kg, but could weigh over 63 kg by 1943, depending on the variant. The basic FAB-50SV bomb consisted of two sections steel forged into a teardrop shape and welded together. All were armed by a single fuse (varied depending on type) matched to a propeller screw arming mechanism and were mounted via a single steel strap which made it possible to attach to almost any bomb rack available. Fuses used included the AV-1, AV-1d/u, & ADP screw driven fuses. TNT was the most commonly used high explosive charge, but some bombs used Picric acid instead. At least 25 variations of the FAB-50 were produced. On 17 September, 1942 the State Defense Committee issued decree number 2313 SS which stipulated increasing the number of completed FAB-50 bombs to 10,000 in September and 25,000 in October of that same year.

FAB-50 bombs were used in numerous quantities, and unexploded bombs are still being found in Ukraine and Russia.

== Models ==
This is only a partial list.

FAB-50 Bombs
Designation	Diameter (mm)	Length (mm)	Bomb mass (kg)	Explosive mass (kg)	Notes
FAB-50SV	240	941	49.76	26.35	Forged steel body, riveted tail fins.
FAB-50ShG	240	938	49.6	26.35	Riveted five-piece steel body.
FAB-50TsK	219	950	60	25	Cast steel, tail fins riveted.
FAB-50SL	219	950	63-65	25	Cast steel, tail fins riveted. Very similar to the TsK but manufactured at the Rostselmash factory.
FAB-50SCh	219	920	65.4	24	Cast steel, tail fins mounted by steel strap. Production started in 1943 as beefed up version of TsK.
FAB-50m9	152	966	42	8.8	152mm artillery shell modified into a bomb. Production started in 1935/1936. Limited production, primarily used by the Polikarpov Po-2.
FAB-50TR	105-152	920	45	Varied	Captured French, British, German, and Romanian artillery shells modified into bombs. Tail fins clamped on and often created by field units. Bombs of this type were made and used during the Siege of Sevastopol (1941–1942). The Romanian 152mm shells proved popular and stocks were eventually used up during the war.
