= Nadezhda Popova =

Soviet military aviator (1921–2013)

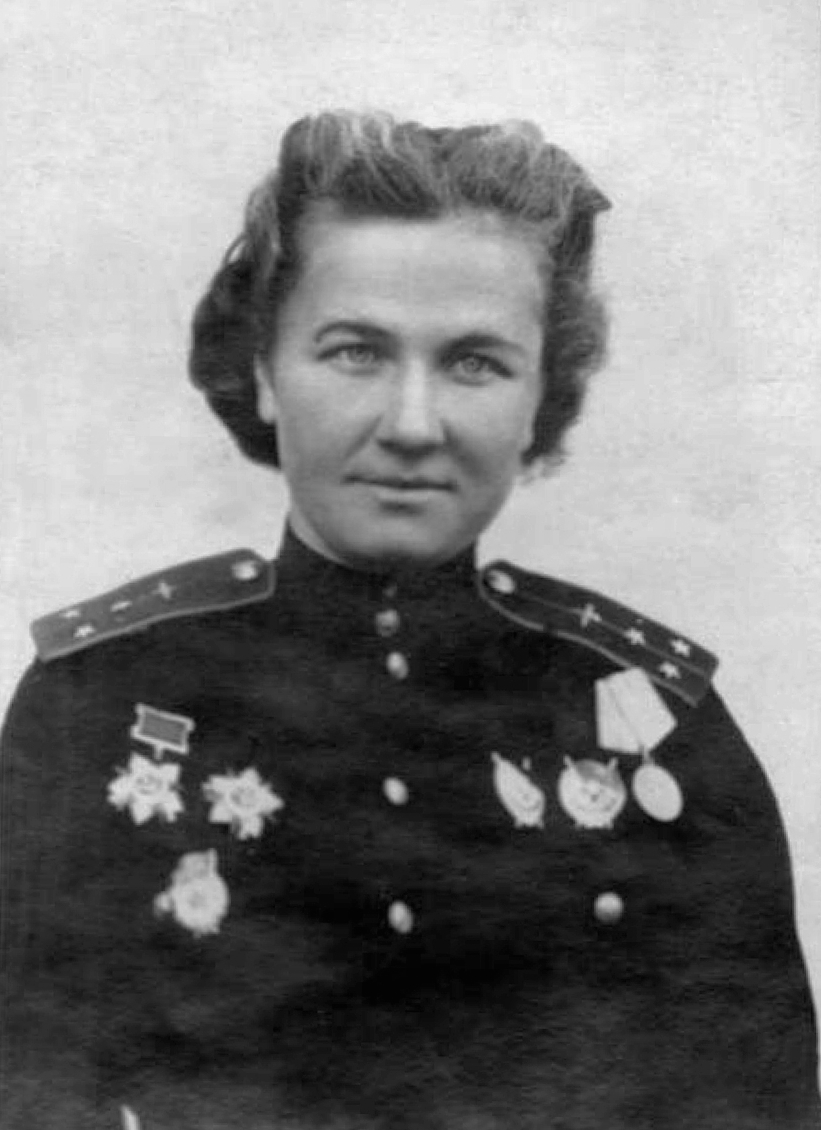
- Native name: Наде́жда Васи́льевна Попо́ва, Надія Василівна Попова
- Born: 17 December 1921; Shabanovka, Orel Oblast, Russian SFSR
- Died: 6 July 2013 (aged 91) Moscow, Russia
- Allegiance: Soviet Union
- Branch: Soviet Air Force
- Service years: 1941–1952
- Rank: Colonel
- Awards: Hero of the Soviet Union
- Spouse: Semyon Kharlamov

Nadezhda Vasilyevna Popova (Russian: Наде́жда Васи́льевна Попо́ва, Ukrainian: Надія Василівна Попова; 17 December 1921 – 8 July 2013) was a squadron commander in the 46th Taman Guards Night Bomber Regiment during the Second World War who achieved significant domestic publicity after completing 18 bombing sorties in one night with navigator Yekaterina Ryabova. Awarded the title Hero of the Soviet Union on 23 February 1945 for completing 737 sorties, she was featured on the cover of Komsomolskaya Pravda and in many other major Soviet publications during the war.

== Early life ==
Popova was born in Shabanovka on 17 December 1921. The daughter of a railwayman, she grew up near the Donetsk coal fields in Ukraine. As an adolescent, she loved music, song, and dance, taking part in amateur plays and musicals, and considered becoming an actress or doctor before entering aviation. The Economist reported that she was a "wild spirit, easily bored; she loved to tango, foxtrot, sing along to jazz. It made her feel free." When a small aircraft landed near her village, she became enamored with aviation, enrolling in a gliding school at the age of 15 without telling her parents. "Walking towards a plane, every time, she would get a knot in her stomach; every time she took off, she was thrilled all over again."

In 1937, she made both her first parachute jump and her first solo flight at the age of sixteen. Despite her parents' opposition, she pursued her new passion and obtained her flying license.

She was initially rejected as a student by a pilot school, but after Polina Osipenko, the Inspector for Aviation in the Moscow Military District, recommended her, she was allowed to enroll in the Kherson flight school, graduating at the age of eighteen and becoming a flight instructor.

== World War II ==
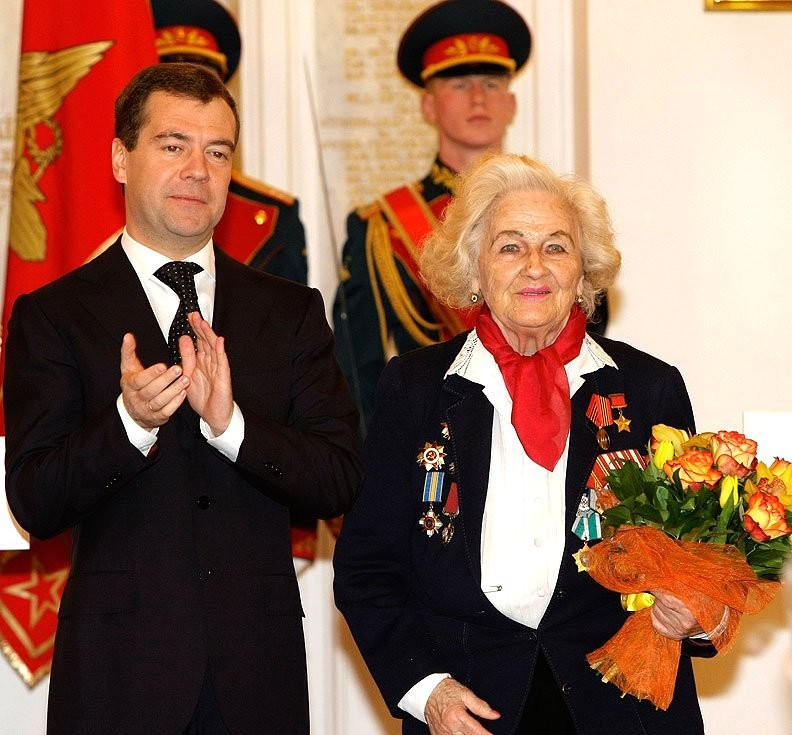
Popova with Russian president Medvedev in 2009

Popova volunteered to be a military pilot, but the government initially barred women from combat and turned her away. But in October 1941, Joseph Stalin caved in to pressure from Marina Raskova and permitted the creation of three women's aviation regiments.

Popova, whose brother Leonid had been killed at the front in 1941 and whose home had been taken by invading German troops, was sent by Marina Raskova to Engels to join other women being trained to become military pilots. She then joined the 588th Night Bomber Aviation Regiment, which flew the Polikarpov Po-2, a bi-plane used as a crop duster before the war. The regiment flew combat sorties exclusively at night; their planes, which were not equipped with guns, radios, radar, or parachutes, would catch fire easily if hit by tracer-bullets (though they were usually actually better protected against splinters then more modern variants).

On 10 March 1942, during a training mission, Popova was leading a formation when two aircraft got lost in a heavy blizzard and crashed, killing their crews. These were the first casualties sustained by her unit. After training, she was sent to fight in her childhood home region of the Donetsk coal fields. The regiment was called "Nachthexen" (Night Witches) by the Germans "because the whooshing noise their plywood and canvas airplanes made reminded the Germans of the sound of a witch’s broomstick."

Popova was shot down several times in the three years she spent fighting, but was never badly wounded. On 2 August 1942, she was on a day reconnaissance mission when she was attacked by Luftwaffe fighters and forced to make an emergency landing near Cherkessk. Trying to return to her unit, she joined a motorized column, and among the wounded met her future husband, fighter pilot Semyon Kharlamov, who was reading And Quiet Flows the Don.

She later flew a relief mission through enemy fire over Novorossiysk, dropping food, water and medical supplies to the forces trapped in Malaya Zemlya, nearly not making it. After returning, she found her aircraft riddled with bullet holes, right down to her map and helmet.

As the Axis forces began their retreat, Popova's unit followed the front through Belarus and Poland and eventually entered Germany. It was in Poland that she reached her personal record of 18 sorties in one night. In total, Popova completed 852 sorties in the war.

== Post-war life ==
The 46th Guards Night Bomber Regiment was dissolved in October 1945, and Popova returned to her town to a hero's welcome, complete with marching band and flowers thrown over her car. She was driven to the theatre, where 2,000 people were waiting for her, among them one of the marines she had helped in Malaya Zemlya.

She married soon after the war; her husband went on to attain the rank of colonel general in the Soviet Air Force, and her son Aleksandr is a graduate of the Air Academy, and she worked as a flight instructor for almost two decades. Widowed in 1990, she died on 8 July 2013 at the age of 91.

== Awards ==
- Hero of the Soviet Union (23 February 1945)
- Order of Lenin (23 February 1945)
- Three Order of the Red Banner (19 October 1942, 25 October 1943, and 15 June 1945)
- Two Order of the Patriotic War 1st class (30 August 1944 and 11 March 1985)
- Order of the Patriotic War 2nd class (2 May 1943)
- Order of Friendship (1 April 1995)
- Order of Honour (4 May 2000)
- Honorary citizen of Donetsk (1985)

== See also ==
- Night Witches
- List of female Heroes of the Soviet Union

== Bibliography ==
- Axell, Albert (2002). Russia's Heroes. Little, Brown Book Group. ISBN 978-1-4721-0390-1.
- Cottam, Kazimiera (1998). Women in War and Resistance: Selected Biographies of Soviet Women Soldiers. Focus Publishing/R. Pullins. ISBN 978-1-58510-160-3.
- Milanetti, Gian Piero (2011). Le Streghe della Notte: La storia non-detta delle eroiche ragazze-pilota dell'Unione Sovietica nella Grande Guerra Patriottica [The Night Witches: The unspoken story of the Soviet Union's heroic pilot girls in the Great Patriotic War] (in Italian). Istituto Bibliografico Napoleone, Roma, Italia. ISBN 978-88-7565-100-8.
- Simonov, Andrey; Chudinova, Svetlana (2017). Женщины - Герои Советского Союза и России [Women – Heroes of the Soviet Union and Russia]. Moscow: Russian Knights Foundation and Museum of Technology Vadim Zadorozhny. ISBN 9785990960701. OCLC 1019634607.
- Strebe, Amy Goodpaster (2007). Flying for Her Country: The American and Soviet Women Military Pilots of World War II. Greenwood Publishing Group. ISBN 978-0-275-99434-1.
