= Grigory Sivkov =

Soviet aviator

Grigory Flegontovich Sivkov
- Григорий Флегонтович Сивков
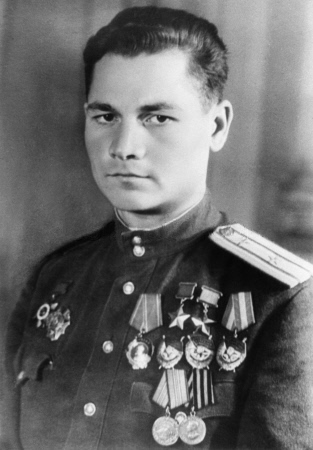
- Born: 10 February 1921; Martynovo village, Perm Governorate, RSFSR (located within present day Kungursky District)
- Died: 20 November 2009 (aged 88); Moscow, Russian Federation
- Spouse: Yekaterina Ryabova
- Military career
- Allegiance: Soviet Union
- Branch: Soviet Air Force
- Service years: 1940 – 1986
- Rank: General-major of Aviation
- Conflicts: World War II
- Awards: Hero of the Soviet Union (twice)

Grigory Flegontovich Sivkov (Russian: Григорий Флегонтович Сивков; 10 February 1921 – 20 November 2009) was a Soviet aviator during the Second World War who was twice awarded the title Hero of the Soviet Union for flying over 200 ground-attack missions.

== Early life ==
Sivkov was born on 10 February 1921 to a Russian peasant family in the village of Martynovo. In 1935 he graduated from seven years of schooling, after which he studied at an aeroclub and an aviation technical school. In 1938 he graduated from the Perm Aeroclub, and after graduating from the Perm Aviation Technical School in 1939 he entered the Soviet Military. The next year he graduated from the Perm Military Aviation School of Pilots, after which he received assignments in the Kiev and Odessa military districts.

== World War II ==
During the beginning of the German invasion of the Soviet Union, Sivkov was a pilot at an aviation training center on the Southern Front. In December 1941 he was deployed to the warfront as a pilot in the 210th Short-Range Aviation Regiment; in May 1942 he became a flight commander in the 210th Assault Aviation Regiment. He fought on the Southern, North Caucasian, Transcaucasian and 3rd Ukrainian Fronts as well as in the battles for Donbass, Crimea, Romania, Bulgaria, Yugoslavia, Budapest, and Vienna. By the end of the war he had flown 42 missions on the Su-2 and 188 missions on the Il-2. Despite having been shot down five times and sustaining a severe head injury on 24 June 1942, he lived to see the end of the war and rose up through the ranks to the position of squadron commander and on 10 March 1945 he became a Major, having been a junior lieutenant at the start of the war. He was awarded the title Hero of the Soviet Union for the first time on 5 February 1944 for his first 130 sorties, and on 18 August 1945 he was awarded the title again for making a total of 223 sorties during the war.

== Later life ==
In 1952 Sivkov graduated from the Zhukovsky Air Force Engineering Academy. From July 1952 to October 1953 he worked as a test pilot at the State Red Banner Air Force Test Institute, where he conducted test flights of the MiG-15 fighter, Il-10 attack aircraft, and Mi-1 helicopter. He went on to return to the Zhukovsky Air Force Engineering Academy where after defending his thesis he headed a laboratory, became a teacher, and was a senior researcher. In December 1972 he became the head of the flight safety department, and in 1984 he became a General-Major of Aviation shortly before retiring in 1986. During his career he authored over 70 scientific papers.

In 1945 he married Yekaterina Ryabova, a Hero of the Soviet Union from the women's 46th Guards Night Bomber Regiment who he had met at the warfront. Their first daughter Natalya was born in 1947, and their second child Irina was born in 1952. Yekaterina died in 1974.

== Awards ==
- Twice Hero of the Soviet Union (4 February 1944 and 18 August 1945)
- Order of Lenin (2 February 1944)
- Order of the October Revolution (21 February 1978)
- Two Order of the Red Banner (9 September 1942 and 27 April 1943)
- Order of Alexander Nevsky (30 September 1944)
- Two Order of the Patriotic War 1st class (17 June 1943 and 11 March 1985)
- Order of the Red Star (26 December 1955)
- Bulgaria - Order of 9 September 1944 2nd class (14 September 1974)
- Hungary - Order of the Red Banner (4 April 1955)
- campaign and jubilee medals
