= Yekaterina Ryabova =

Soviet World War II navigator

Yekaterina Vasilevna Ryabova
- Екатерина Васильевна Рябова
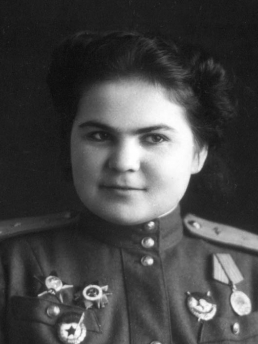
- Ryabova in 1945
- Born: 14 July 1921; Gus-Zhelezny, Russian SFSR, Soviet Union
- Died: 12 September 1974 (aged 53); Moscow, Russian SFSR, Soviet Union
- Military career
- Allegiance: Soviet Union
- Branch: Soviet Air Force
- Service years: 1941–1945
- Rank: Senior lieutenant
- Unit: 46th Guards Night Bomber Regiment
- Awards: Hero of the Soviet Union

Yekaterina Vasilevna Ryabova (Russian: Екатерина Васильевна Рябова; 14 July 1921 – 12 September 1974) was a Soviet World War II navigator awarded the title of Hero of the Soviet Union on 23 February 1945 for her World War II bombing missions. She attained the rank of senior lieutenant as a member of the 46th Guards Night Bomber Regiment, flying 890 night missions in a Polikarpov Po-2.

== Early life ==
Ryabova was born in 1921 to a Russian peasant family in Gus-Zhelezny, currently located in Ryazan, Russia. After graduating from secondary school she enrolled in the MSU Faculty of Mechanics and Mathematics where she studied until the German invasion of the Soviet Union. In 1943 she became a member of the Communist Party.

== Military career ==
Ryabova entered the Engels military aviation school in October 1941 to become a navigator in the 588th Night Bomber Regiment, one of the three women's aviation regiments founded by Marina Raskova. The navigation courses normally lasted three years, but due to the war the classes only lasted three months. The regiment was deployed to the Southern Front in May 1942 it received the Guards designation and was reorganized into the 46th Guards Night Bomber Regiment. After entering the war as a flight navigator she was eventually promoted to the position of squadron navigator under the command of squadron navigator Marina Chechneva. One time in 1944 she and pilot Nadezhda Popova flew 18 bombing sorties in a single night over Poland.

In total she flew 890 sorties during the war, with her last mission taking place over Berlin after participating in bombing campaigns in Taman, Crimea, Belarus, and Poland. On 23 February 1945 Ryabova was declared a Hero of the Soviet Union for completing 816 missions, and the medal of the award was presented to her by the commander of the 2nd Byelorussian Front, Konstantin Rokossovsky, on 8 March.

== Later life ==
After the war Ryabova was sent by the regiment commander to attend the Russian Air Force Academy (now the Gagarin Air Force Academy) with Mariya Smirnova, but they were not admitted because the academy was officially closed to women. After being rejected from the Air Force Academy, she returned to her studies at Moscow State University, where she remained socially active after graduating in 1948 from the Faculty of Mechanics and Mathematics before defending her thesis and earning her Ph.D. in 1951. After graduating she worked as a teacher at the Moscow Polygraphic Institute, and from 1963 to 1972 she worked as an Associate Professor of the Department of Theoretical Mechanics at the Dzerzhinsky Military Engineering Academy. During her life she traveled to Italy, France, Korea, and Bulgaria. Due to a head injury she suffered in the war she experienced severe headaches often but tried to hide them, only to end up fainting when greeting an Italian delegation.

In June 1945 she married twice Hero of the Soviet Union Grigory Sivkov, whom she had met during the war. She gave birth to her first daughter Natalya in 1947 and her second daughter Irina in 1952.

She died on 12 September 1974 when she was only 53 years old. Her diary contained writing about headaches doctors said were from the head injury in the war when her head slammed against the cockpit dashboard during a hard landing.

== Awards and honors ==
- Hero of the Soviet Union (23 February 1945)
- Order of Lenin (23 February 1945)
- Order of the Red Banner (25 October 1943)
- Order of the Patriotic War (26 April 1943)
- Order of the Red Star (26 December 1942)

== See also ==
- List of female Heroes of the Soviet Union
- Nadezhda Popova
