= Polikarpov Po-2 =

All-weather multirole Soviet biplane

Po-2 "Kukuruznik"
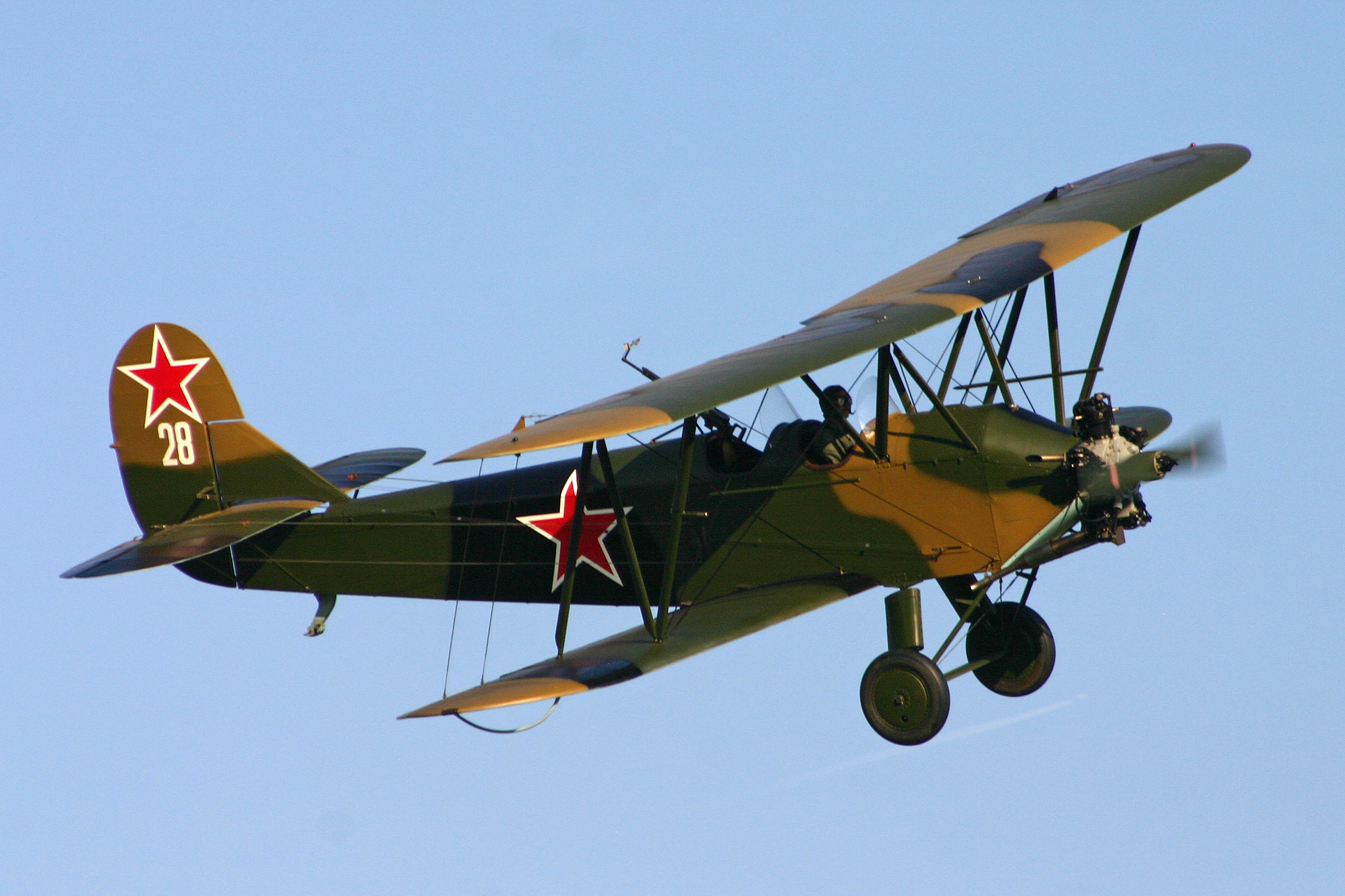
- 1944 Polikarpov Po-2 of The Shuttleworth Collection, United Kingdom

General information
- Type: Utility biplane
- Manufacturer: Polikarpov
- Primary users: Soviet Air Force Aeroflot; DOSAAF
- Number built: 20,000–33,000

History
- Manufactured: 1928–1959
- Introduction date: 1929
- First flight: 24 June 1927

The Polikarpov Po-2 (also U-2 before 1944, for its initial uchebnyy, 'training', role as a flight instruction aircraft) is an all-weather multirole Soviet biplane, nicknamed Kukuruznik (Russian: Кукурузник, (Note: Soviets later used kukuruznik as a nickname for Soviet leader Nikita Khrushchev, notorious for advocating indiscriminate planting of maize all over the Soviet Union, as well as for the Antonov An-2, an aircraft with similar characteristics.) NATO reporting name "Mule"). The reliable, uncomplicated design of the Po-2 made it an ideal trainer aircraft, as well as doubling as a low-cost ground attack, aerial reconnaissance, psychological warfare and liaison aircraft during war, proving to be one of the most versatile light combat types to be built in the Soviet Union. As of 1978, it remained in production for a longer period of time than any other Soviet-era aircraft.

Production figures for Polikarpov U-2 and Po-2 bombers and trainers combined are between 20,000 and 33,000 with production ending as early as 1952. Precise figures are hard to obtain since low-rate production by small repair shops and aero clubs is believed to have continued until 1959.

== Design and development ==
The aircraft was designed by Nikolai Polikarpov to replace the U-1 trainer (a copy of the British Avro 504), which was known as Avrushka to the Soviets.

The prototype of the U-2, powered by a 74 kW (99 hp) Shvetsov M-11 air-cooled five-cylinder radial engine, first flew on 7 January 1928 piloted by M. M. Gromov. Aircraft from the preproduction series were tested at the end of 1928 and serial production started in 1929 in Factory number 23 in Leningrad. Its name was changed to Po-2 in 1944, after Polikarpov's death, according to the then-new Soviet naming system, usually using the first two letters of the designer's family name, or the Soviet government-established design bureau that created it. Production in the Soviet Union ended in 1953, but license-built CSS-13s were still produced in Poland until 1959.

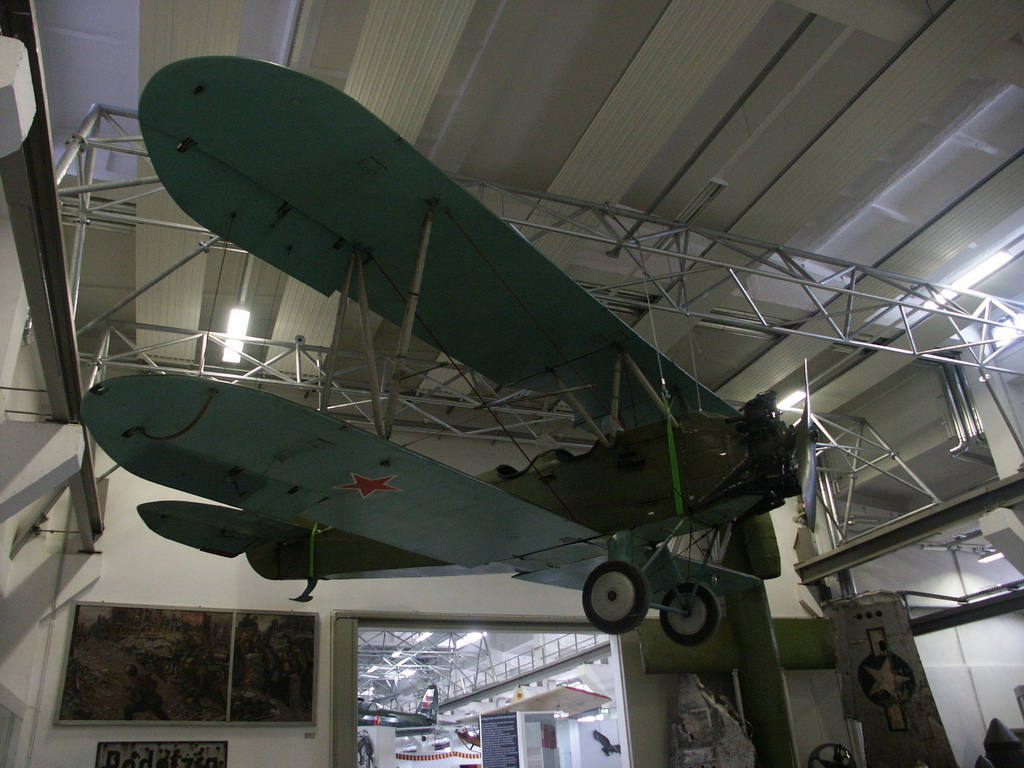
A Po-2 at a museum in Dresden, Germany

== Operational history ==
=== World War II ===
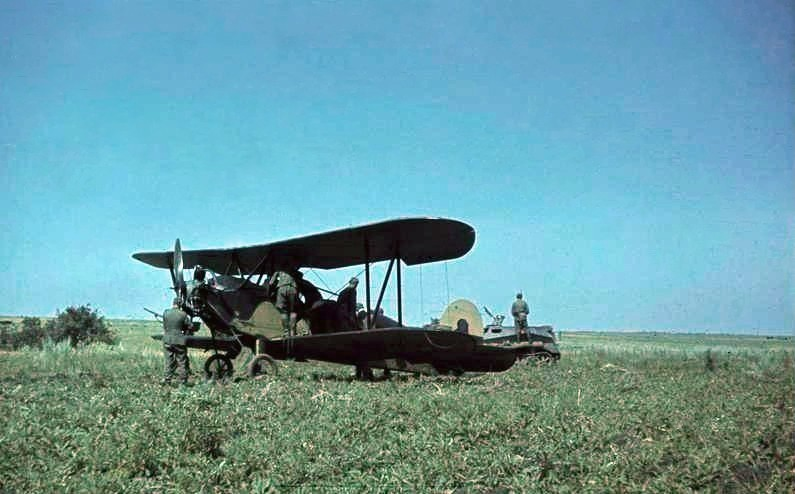
Damaged and abandoned Po-2 forced to land in Ukraine, and subsequently captured by German troops, 1941.

From the beginning, the U-2 became the basic Soviet civil and military trainer aircraft, mass-produced in a "Red Flyer" factory near Moscow. It was also used for transport, and as a military liaison aircraft, due to its STOL capabilities. Also from the beginning it was produced as an agricultural aircraft variant, which earned it its nickname Kukuruznik. Although entirely outclassed by contemporary aircraft, the Kukuruznik served extensively on the Eastern Front in World War II, primarily as a liaison, medevac, and general-supply aircraft. It was especially useful for supplying Soviet partisans behind the German front line. Manufacturing of the Po-2 in the USSR ceased in 1949, but until 1959 a number were assembled in Aeroflot repair workshops.

The first trials of arming the aircraft with bombs took place in 1941.

During the defence of Odessa in September 1941, the U-2 was used as a reconnaissance aircraft and as a light, short-range, bomber. The bombs, dropped from a civil aircraft piloted by Pyotr Bevz, were the first to fall on enemy artillery positions. From 1942, it was adapted as a light night ground attack aircraft.

Nikolay Polikarpov supported the project, and under his leadership, the U-2VS (voyskovaya seriya – Military series) was created. This was a light night bomber, fitted with bomb carriers beneath the lower wing, to carry 50 or 100 kg (110 or 220 lbs) bombs up to a total weight of 350 kg (771 lb) and armed with ShKAS or DA machine guns in the observer's cockpit.

The U-2 became known as the aircraft used by the 588th Night Bomber Regiment, composed of an all-woman pilot and ground crew complement. The unit became famous for daring low-altitude night raids on German rear-area positions. Veteran pilots Yekaterina Ryabova and Nadezhda Popova on one occasion flew eighteen missions in a single night. The women pilots observed that the enemy suffered a further degree of demoralization simply due to their antagonists being female. As such, the pilots earned the nickname "Night Witches" (German Nachthexen, Russian Ночные Ведьмы/Nočnye Ved'my). The unit earned numerous Hero of the Soviet Union citations and dozens of Order of the Red Banner medals; most surviving pilots had flown nearly 1,000 combat missions by the end of the war and took part in the Battle of Berlin.

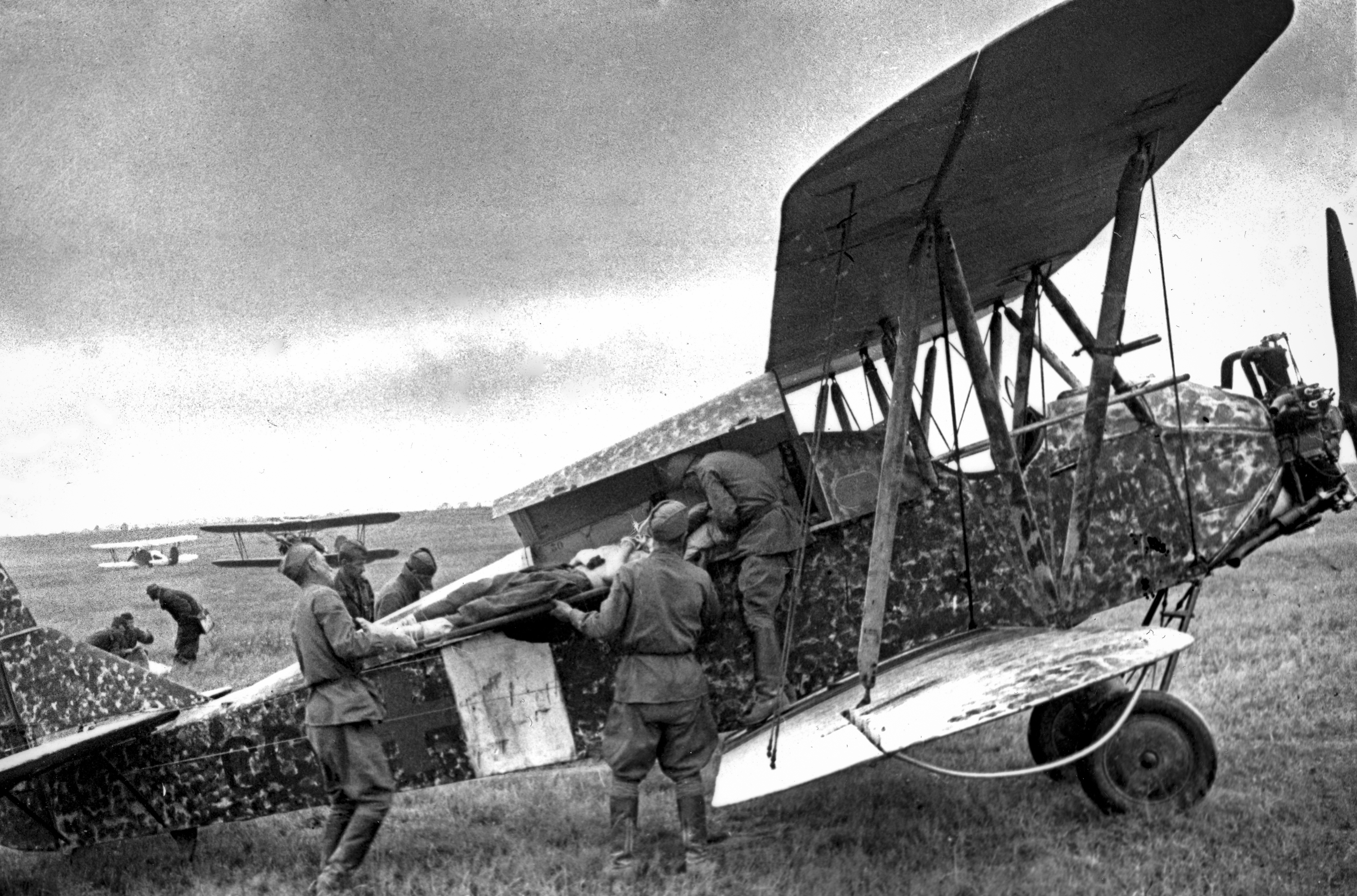
A wounded soldier being loaded onto a U-2 for evacuation to a hospital in the rear, 1941

The material effects of these missions may be regarded as minor, but the psychological effect on German troops was noticeable. They typically attacked by surprise in the middle of the night, denying German troops sleep and keeping them on their guard, contributing to the already high stress of combat on the Eastern front. The usual tactic involved flying only a few meters above the ground, climbing for the final approach, throttling back the engine and making a gliding bombing run, leaving the targeted troops with only the eerie whistling of the wind in the wings' bracing wires as an indication of the impending attack. Luftwaffe fighters found it extremely hard to shoot down the Kukuruznik because of two main factors: the pilots flew at treetop level where they were hard to see or engage and the stall speed of both the Messerschmitt Bf 109 and the Focke-Wulf Fw 190 was similar to the U-2s maximum speed, making it difficult for the fighters to keep a Po-2 in weapons range for an adequate period of time. The success of the Soviet night harassment units inspired the Luftwaffe to set up similar Störkampfstaffel "harassment combat squadrons" on the Eastern Front using their own obsolete 1930s-era, open cockpit biplanes (most often the Gotha Go 145 and Arado Ar 66 biplanes) and parasol monoplane aircraft, eventually building up to larger Nachtschlachtgruppe (night attack group) units of a few squadrons each.

The Polish Air Force used these slow and manoeuvrable aircraft for air reconnaissance and COIN operations against UPA detachments in mountainous area of Bieszczady. Pilots and navigators were dispatched to look for concentrations of UPA forces and if needed, engage them with machine guns and grenades. On several occasions, the UPA managed to bring down some of the Po-2s, but never captured or operated them.

The U-2's 5-cylinder engine had an unusual exhaust manifold arrangement that gave the engine a peculiar rattling or popping sound which made the airplane easily identifiable even at night. German soldier Claus Neuber listed in his war diary six different German nicknames for the plane, the most common of which were Nähmaschine (sewing machine) or Kaffeemühle, (coffee mill), both due to the distinctive engine sound. Neuber added that some German troops derisively called it the "Runway Crow" or "Fog Crow". He also cited the nicknames "Iron Gustav", for the belly armor the plane carried to protect it from ground fire, and "The Duty NCO" because the plane almost always came at night at the same time. The fabric and wood construction of the airplane made it extremely vulnerable to catching fire when hit by tracer rounds, resulting in a Russian nickname of Kerosinka, or kerosene lantern. Finnish troops called it Hermosaha (Nerve Saw) as the engine sound was similar as a band saw.

=== Korean War ===
North Korean forces used the Po-2 in a similar role during the Korean War. A significant number of Po-2s were fielded by the Korean People's Air Force, inflicting serious damage during night raids on United Nations bases. During one such attack, a lone Po-2 attacked Pyongyang Air Base. Concentrating on the 8th Fighter-Bomber Group's parking ramp, the Po-2 dropped a string of fragmentation bombs squarely across the group's lineup of P-51 Mustangs. Eleven Mustangs were damaged, three so badly that they were destroyed when Pyongyang was abandoned several days later.

On 17 June 1951, at 01:30 hours, Suwon Air Base was bombed by two Po-2s. Each biplane dropped a pair of fragmentation bombs. One scored a hit on the 802nd Engineer Aviation Battalion's motor pool, damaging some equipment. Two bombs burst on the flightline of the 335th Fighter Interceptor Squadron. One F-86A Sabre (FU-334 / 49–1334) was struck on the wing and began burning. The fire took hold, gutting the aircraft. Prompt action by personnel who moved aircraft away from the burning Sabre prevented further loss. Eight other Sabres were damaged in the brief attack, four seriously. One F-86 pilot was among the wounded. The North Koreans subsequently credited Lt. La Woon Yung with this damaging attack.

UN forces named the Po-2's nighttime appearance Bedcheck Charlie and had great difficulty in shooting it down – even though night fighters had radar as standard equipment in the 1950s. The wood-and-fabric material of the Po-2 had only a small radar cross-section, making it hard for an opposing fighter pilot to acquire their target. As Korean war U.S. veteran Leo Fournier remarked about "Bedcheck Charlie" in his memoirs: "... no one could get at him. He just flew too low and too slow." On 16 June 1953, a USMC AD-4 from VMC-1 piloted by Major George H. Linnemeier and CWO Vernon S. Kramer shot down a Po-2, the only documented Skyraider air victory of the war. The Po-2 is also the only biplane credited with a documented jet-kill, as one Lockheed F-94 Starfire was lost while slowing down to 161 km/h (100 mph) – below its stall speed – during an intercept in order to engage the low flying Po-2.

== Variants ==
- U-2: Basic model, built in large numbers as a two-seat primary trainer. It was also built in many different versions, both as civil and military aircraft. The U-2 variants also included a light transport, utility, reconnaissance and training aircraft. Power plant was the M-11 radial piston engine of 75 kW (100 hp). Later models were also equipped with uprated M-11 engines of 111 kW (150 hp). Some aircraft were fitted with a rear closed cabin, other were fitted with sledges or floats.
- U-2A: Two-seat agricultural crop dusting aircraft, powered by an 86 kW (115 hp) M-11K radial piston engine. Later redesignated Po-2A after 1944.
- U-2AO: Two-seat agricultural aircraft.
- U-2AP: Agricultural aircraft, with a rear cab replaced with a container for 200–250 kg (441–551 lb) of chemicals. 1,235 were built in 1930–1940.
- U-2G: This experimental aircraft had all the controls linked to the control column. One aircraft only.
- U-2KL: Two aircraft fitted with a bulged canopy over the rear cabin.
- U-2LSh: Two-seat ground-attack, close-support aircraft. The aircraft were armed with one 7.62 mm (0.30 in) ShKAS machine-gun in the rear cockpit. It could also carry up to 120 kg (265 lb) of bombs and(or?) four RS-82 rockets. Also known as the U-2VOM-1.
- U-2LPL: Experimental prone-pilot research aircraft.
- U-2M: This floatplane version was fitted with a large central float and two small stabilizing floats. Not built in large numbers. Also known as the MU-2.
- U-2NAK: Two-seat night artillery observation with observer's cabin fully equipped with radios. Also used for reconnaissance. Built from 1943.
- U-2P: Floatplane version, built only in limited numbers, in several variants with different designations.
- U-2S: Air ambulance version, built from 1934. It could take a physician and an injured on a stretcher on a rear fuselage, under a cover. Variant U-2S-1 from 1939 had a raised fuselage top upon the stretcher. From 1941 there were also used two containers for stretchers, that could be fitted over lower wings or two containers for two seating injured each, fitted under lower wings.
- U-2SS: Air ambulance aircraft.
- U-2ShS: Staff liaison version, built from 1943. It had a wider fuselage and a closed 4-place rear cab.
- U-2SP: Civil transport version, could carry two passengers in open individual cabs, built from 1933. Other roles included aerial survey, and aerial photography. A total of 861 were built between 1934 and 1939.
- U-2SPL: This limousine version was fitted with rear cabin for two passengers.
- U-2UT: Two-seat training aircraft, powered by an 86 kW (115 hp) M-11D radial piston engine. Built in limited numbers.
- U-2LNB: Somewhat like the earlier -LSh version, a Soviet Air Force two-seat night attack version, built from 1942. Armed with one 7.62 mm (0.30 in) ShKAS for rear defense, plus up to 250 kg of bombs under the wings for land support. Earlier aircraft were converted to improvised bombers from 1941.
- U-2VS : Two-seat training and utility aircraft. Later redesignated Po-2VS after 1944.
- U-3: Improved flying training model, fitted a 149 kW (200 hp) seven cylinder M-48 radial engine.
- U-4: Cleaned-up version with slimmer fuselage; not built in large numbers.
- - (Total U-2 manufacture: 33,000)
- Po-2: Postwar basic trainer variant.
- Po-2A: Postwar agricultural variant.
- Po-2GN: "Voice from the sky" propaganda aircraft, fitted with a loud speaker.
- Po-2L : Limousine version with an enclosed passenger cabin.
- Po-2P : Postwar floatplane version; built in small numbers.
- Po-2S: Postwar air ambulance variant, with a closed rear cab.
- Po-2S-1: Postwar ambulance version, similar to the pre-war U-2S.
- Po-2S-2: Postwar ambulance version, powered by a M-11D radial piston engine.
- Po-2S-3: Postwar ambulance version, which had two underwing containers, each one was designed to transport one stretcher patient. Also known as the Po-2SKF.
- Po-2ShS: Staff communications aircraft, fitted with an enclosed cabin for the pilot and two or three passengers.
- Po-2SP: Postwar aerial photography, geographic survey aircraft.
- Po-2W: Yugoslav modification powered by 160 hp (120 kW) license-built Walter Minor 6-III engine. 62 modified by Utva 1958–59.
- RV-23: This floatplane version of the U-2 was built in 1937. It was used in a number of seaplane altitude record attempts. The RV-23 was powered by a 529 kW (710 hp) Wright R-1820-F3 Cyclone radial piston engine.
- CSS-13: Polish licence version, built in Poland in WSK-Okęcie and WSK-Mielec after World War II (about 500 built in 1948–1956).
- CSS S-13: Polish ambulance version with a closed rear cab and cockpit and Townend ring (53 built in WSK-Okęcie in 1954–1955, 38 converted to S-13).
- E-23: Research version, built in the Soviet Union in 1934, for research into inverted flight.

== Operators ==
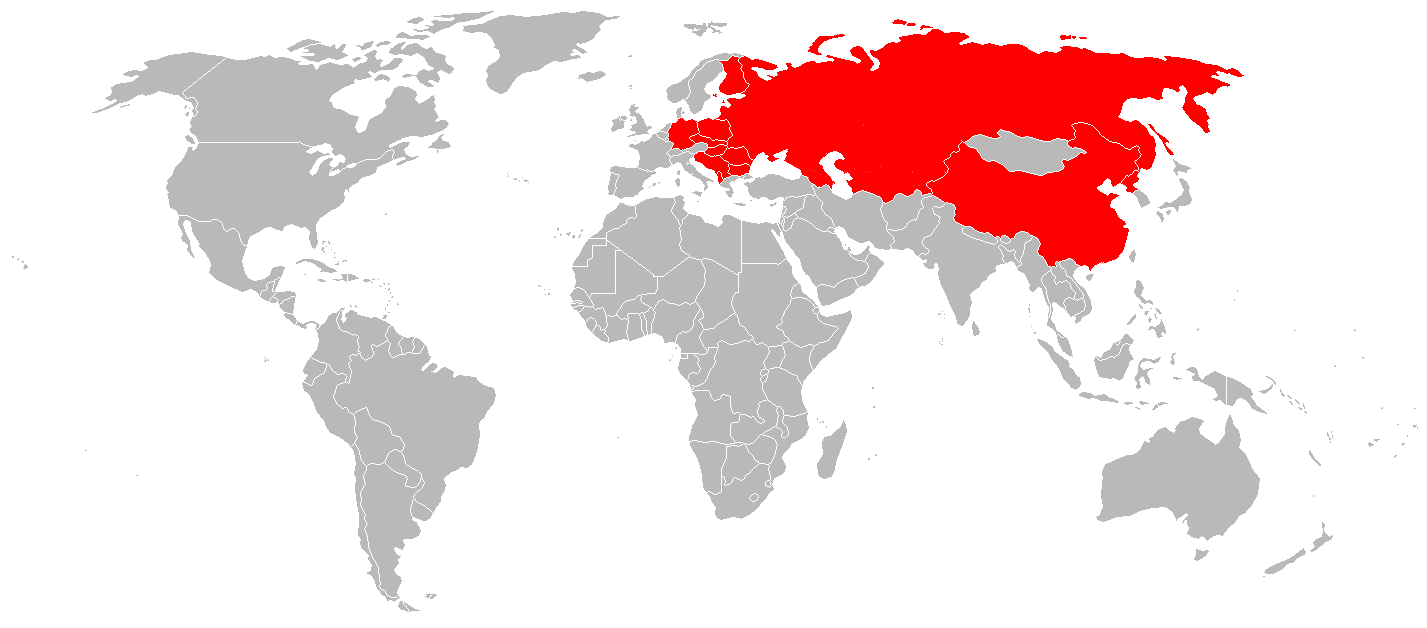
Po-2 operators (Mongolia was also a operator of the Po-2)

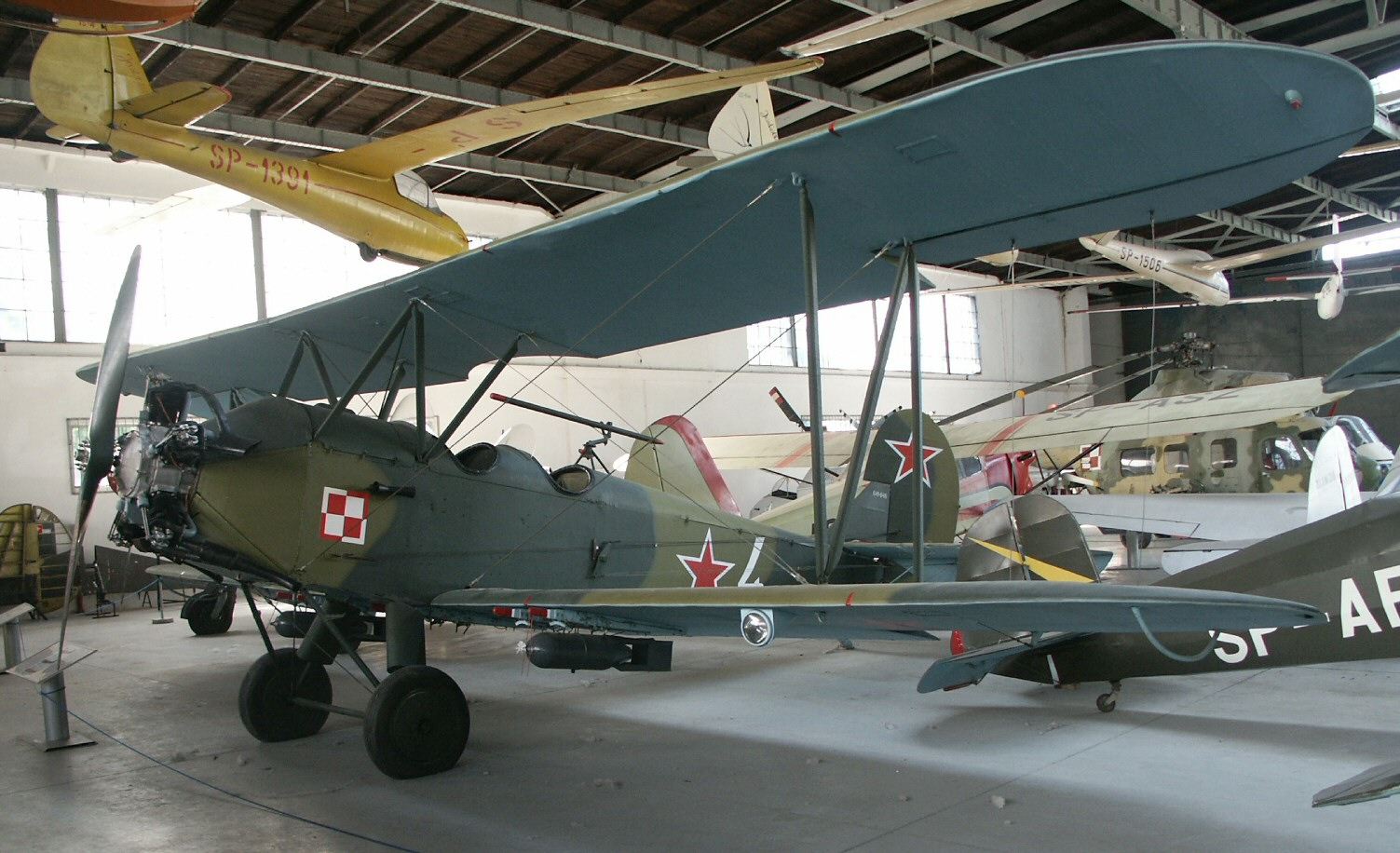
U-2LNB night attack aircraft of the Polish 2nd Night Bomber Regiment "Kraków" (in Polish Aviation Museum)

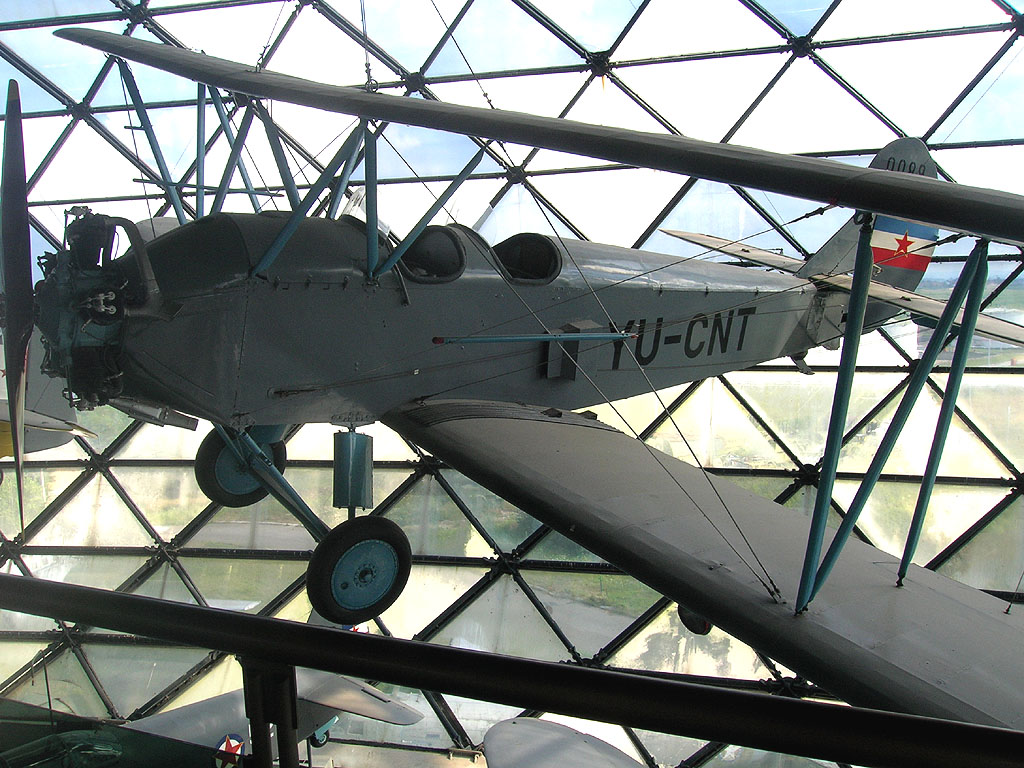
Polikarpov Po-2 with Yugoslav markings, Museum of Aviation in Belgrade, Serbia

Albania

- Albanian Air Force received 78 aircraft between 1950 and 1966 and operated them until 1985. As of 2026, Po-2 is retired from Albanian Air Force.

Bulgaria

- Bulgarian Air Force – 10 aircraft in 1949-1969
- Civilian aviation

China

- People's Liberation Army Air Force

Czechoslovakia

- Czechoslovak Air Force designated as K-62
- Slov-Air

Finland

- Finnish Air Force

France

- Free French Air Force operated Po-2s in the Normandie-Niemen unit.

Germany

- Luftwaffe operated Beuteflugzeug captured aircraft, mainly by clandestine special units such as the Sonderverband Brandenburg.

East Germany

- Barracked People's Police
- East German Air Force
- Sport and Technology Association – used as glider tugs and parachute dropping aircraft until 1968.

Hungary

- Hungarian Air Force
- The Hungarian Sport Bureau operated some aircraft before the 1956 Hungarian Revolution; Three confirmed were in Dunakeszi, one confirmed in Kisapostag.

Mongolia

- MIAT Mongolian Airlines
- Mongolian People's Army Air Force – twenty aircraft acquired between 1932 and 1963.

North Korea

- Korean People's Air Force

Poland

- Air Force of the Polish Army (after 1947 Polish Air Force)
- LOT Polish Airlines – Five Po-2 operated in 1945–1946, 20 CSS-13 for aerospraying in 1953–1956.
- Aeroklub Polski
- Polish Air Ambulance Service
- Polish Navy

Romania

- Romanian Air Force received 45 aircraft in 1949
- Civilian aviation

Soviet Union

- Soviet Air Force
- Aeroflot
- OSOAVIAKhIM
- DOSAAF

Turkey

- Turkish Air League (Turk Hava Kurumu) received two U-2s which were given to Turkey as a gift from Russia in 1933 on the occasion of the 10th anniversary of the Turkish Republic.

Yugoslavia

- SFR Yugoslav Air Force – 120 aircraft in 1944–1959
  - 1st Transport Aviation Regiment (1944–1948)
  - 1st Training Aviation Regiment (1945–1952)
  - 2nd Training Aviation Regiment (1946–1948)
  - 184th Light Night Bomber Aviation Regiment (1948–1952)
  - Liaison Squadron of 1st Military district (1952–1959)
  - Liaison Squadron of 3rd Military district (1952–1959)
  - Liaison Squadron of 5th Military district (1952–1959)
  - Liaison Squadron of 7th Military district (1952–1959)
  - Liaison Squadron of 3rd Aviation Corps (1950–1956)
- Letalski center Maribor (Civil operator)

== Surviving aircraft ==
China

- Po-2 at Beijing Air and Space Museum, China
- Po-2 at Chinese Aviation Museum

Croatia

- 9A-ISC – Po-2 S/N 27 airworthy at Split airport in Split, Croatia

Czech Republic

- SP-BHA – CSS-13 on static display at the Prague Aviation Museum in Prague. It was built in 1955 as the original CSS-13 prototype and flown to the museum in 1972 as a gift from Poland.
- 0076 – Po-2 airworthy at the Metoděj Vlach Air Museum in Mladá Boleslav. It was built in 1937 and given to Yugoslavia in 1945. It served with the Yugoslav Army and then the Koroški Aeroklub, before finally being acquired by the museum in May 2014. It is now painted in its Soviet military scheme once again.

Hungary

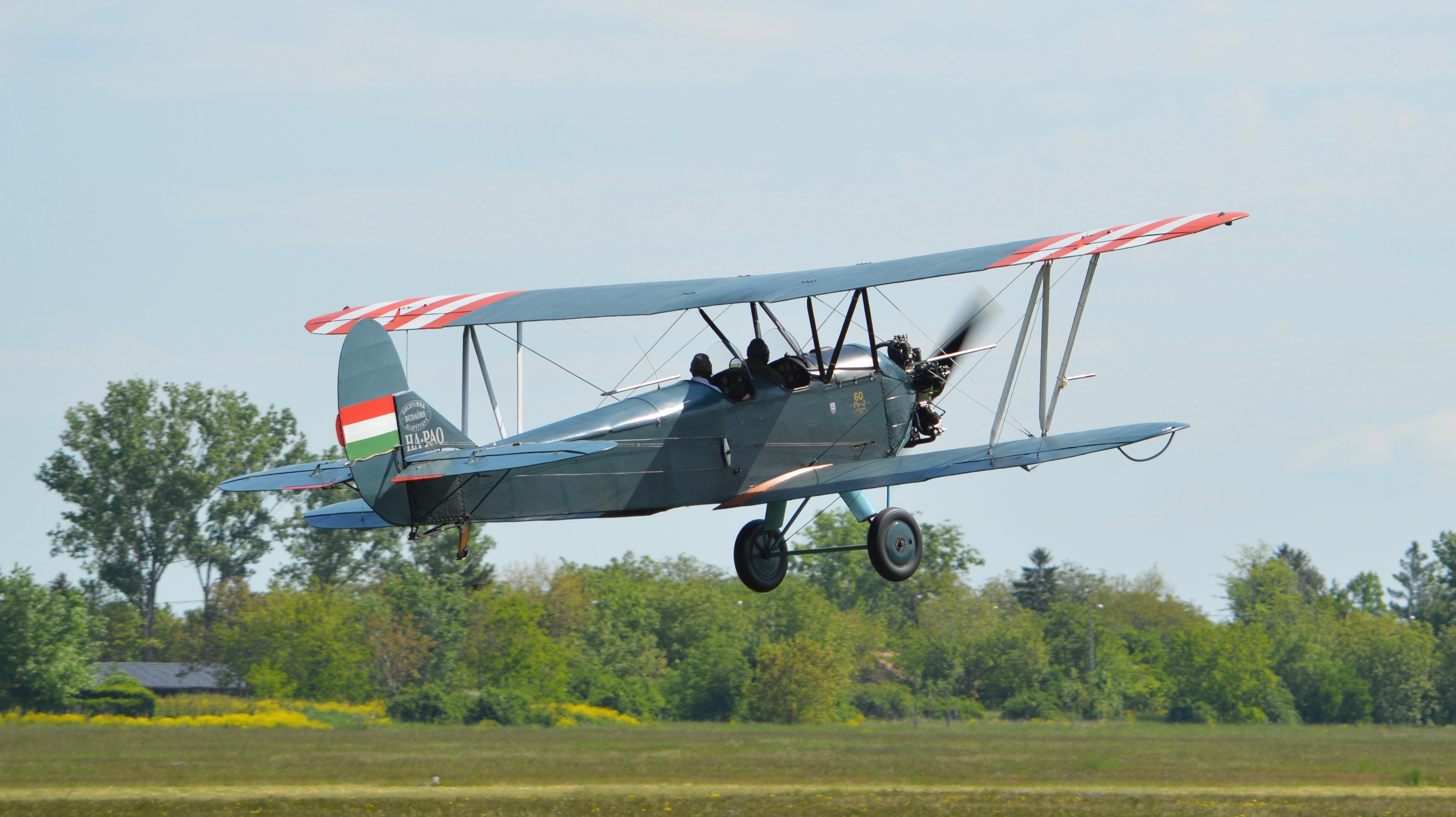
HA-PAO, one of the airworthy specimens at Budaörs Airport.

- HA-PAO – Po-2 airworthy with the Goldtimer Foundation at Budaörs Airport in Budapest, Central Hungary. It is on loan from the Hungarian Museum of Transportation.
- 0443 – CSS-13 on static display at the Airplane Museum of Szolnok in Szolnok, Jász-Nagykun-Szolnok.

New Zealand

- ZK-POL – 641-046 – Po-2 airworthy – based at the Omaka Aviation Heritage Centre; currently owned by Stephen and Chrystal Witte. The number '46' is painted on body – '641-046' is in small numbers on the tail. This aircraft has been rebuilt from a wreck occurring in Russia.

Poland

- 641-646 – Po-2LNB on static display at the Polish Aviation Museum in Kraków, Lesser Poland.
- CSS-13 on static display at National Museum of Agriculture in Szreniawa.

Russia

- Po-2 airworthy at Samara, RA-1945G
- Po-2 airworthy at Gelendzhik, RA-0624G
- Po-2 airworthy at Novosibrsk, Mochishche (UNNM) RA-2508G
- Po-2 airworthy at Novosibrsk, Mochishche (UNNM) RA-1928G
- Po-2 airworthy at Moscow RA-0790G with the Federation of Amateur Aviators of Russia at Tushino Airfield in Tushino, Moscow.

Serbia

- YAF 0089 – Po-2 on static display at the Belgrade Aviation Museum in Surčin, Belgrade.

United Kingdom

- 0094 – Po-2 airworthy with the Shuttleworth Collection in Old Warden, Bedfordshire. Its first post-restoration flight occurred on January 10, 2011.

United States

- 0365 – Po-2 airworthy at Fantasy of Flight in Polk City, Florida.
- 0717 – Po-2 airworthy at the Military Aviation Museum in Virginia Beach, Virginia.
- 641543 – Po-2 airworthy at the Flying Heritage & Combat Armor Museum in Everett, Washington.

== Specifications (U-2) ==
Polikarpov U-2/Po-2 3-view drawing

Data from

General characteristics

- Crew: 2
- Length: 8.17 m (26 ft 10 in)
- Wingspan: 11.4 m (37 ft 5 in)
- Height: 3.1 m (10 ft 2 in)
- Wing area: 33.2 m^{2} (357 sq ft)
- Empty weight: 770 kg (1,698 lb)
- Gross weight: 1,030 kg (2,271 lb)
- Max takeoff weight: 1,350 kg (2,976 lb)
- Powerplant: 1 × Shvetsov M-11D 5-cylinder air-cooled radial piston engine, 93 kW (125 hp)
- Propellers: 2-bladed fixed-pitch propeller

Performance

- Maximum speed: 152 km/h (94 mph, 82 kn)
- Cruise speed: 110 km/h (68 mph, 59 kn)
- Range: 630 km (390 mi, 340 nmi)
- Service ceiling: 3,000 m (9,800 ft)
- Rate of climb: 2.78 m/s (547 ft/min)
- Wing loading: 41 kg/m^{2} (8.4 lb/sq ft)
- Power/mass: 0.060 kW/kg (0.036 hp/lb)

Armament
(U-2VS / LNB only)

- Guns: One 7.62×54mmR (0.30 in) ShKAS machine gun
- Bombs: Six 50 kg (110 lb) FAB-50 bombs

== See also ==
Aircraft of comparable role, configuration, and era

- Avro Tutor
- Bü 131
- Fieseler Fi 156 Storch
- Gotha Go 145
- Levente II
- Westland Lysander

Related lists

- List of most-produced aircraft
- List of interwar military aircraft
- List of aircraft of World War II
- List of military aircraft of the Soviet Union
