= Zinaida Tusnolobova-Marchenko =

Heroine of the Soviet Union (1920–1980)

- Зинаида Михайловна Туснолобова-Марченко
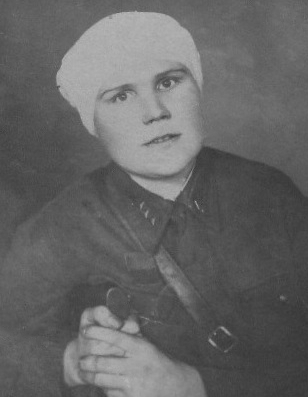
- Born: 23 November 1920; Shevtsovo, Polotsk district, Vitebsk Governorate
- Died: 20 May 1980 (aged 59); Polotsk, Soviet Union
- Military career
- Allegiance: Soviet Union
- Branch: Medical Service
- Service years: 1942–1943
- Rank: Senior Sergeant
- Unit: 849th Rifle Regiment
- Conflicts: World War II; Eastern Front
- Awards: Hero of the Soviet Union

External images
- After amputation surgery
- Tank with "For Zinaida Tusnolobova!" inscribed on the side
- Aircraft with "For Zinaida Tusnolobova!" inscribed by the empennage

Zinaida Mikhailovna Tusnolobova-Marchenko (Russian: Зинаида Михайловна Туснолобова-Марченко; 23 November 1920 – 20 May 1980) was a medic of the Red Army in the 849th Rifle Regiment during World War II. After being attacked by a German soldier in Kursk, suffering from severe frostbite and getting gangrenous wounds, she became a quadruple amputee. With her injuries forcing her to retire from the military she spoke on the radio and wrote an open letter to the soldiers of the 1st Baltic Front which received over 3,000 replies. She was awarded the title Hero of the Soviet Union on 6 December 1957 and the Florence Nightingale Medal in 1965, making her the third Soviet woman to receive the medal from the Red Cross.

== Early life ==
Tusnolobova-Marchenko was born on 23 November 1920 to a family of farmers on the Shevtsovo farm in Polotsk, located in present-day Belarus. After graduating from secondary school she worked as a chemist in Leninskugol; she joined the military after the start of the war and became a member of the Communist party in 1942.

== World War II ==
Tusnolobova-Marchenko joined the Red Army in April 1942 after the start of the Second World War and after graduating from nursing courses was assigned to the 849th Rifle Regiment.

During her first eight months of military service, she evacuated 123 wounded Soviet soldiers from the battlefield. On 2 February 1943 while trying to rescue a wounded platoon commander she was seriously injured, with both of her legs broken. As German soldiers ran across the battlefield she pretended to be dead, but one soldier noticed she was alive and began viciously beating her, nearly to death. A night reconnaissance platoon noticed she was still alive and managed to get her to a field hospital three days later. Having suffered from severe frostbite doctors had to perform eight surgeries to save her life, amputating her left hand, entire right arm, left foot and right leg up to the knee. During the remainder of the war while she was recovering she wrote an open letter to the 1st Baltic Front asking them to take revenge for the suffering inflicted in her and others. In her letter she opened by stating she had been stuck in a hospital bed for 15 months because of the Axis, referring to the Axis only as "the fascists", briefly mentioned her life before the war but went straight to describing her anger at the Axis for how she had to write with a pencil tied to the stub of her elbow, how her brother lost his hand and her husband died in the war, putting it bluntly as "The fascists did it" before ending the letter asking them not to spare a single German soldier to take revenge for the Russian people. The letter resulted in over 3,000 letters and replies from the troops, promising revenge in her name. Numerous Soviet tanks and aircraft bore the text of saying things like "This is for Zinaida" and "For Zinaida Tusnolobova" (Russian: За Зину Туснолобову!), a practice so popular that another Hero of the Soviet Union, Pyotr Andreev, had it written on his plane.

== Postwar life ==
After the war she married a fellow veteran of the war, lieutenant Joseph Petrovich Marchenko, who worked as an engineer after the war. One of her children, Vladimir Marchenko, served in the military for two years. In 1957, well after the end of the war, she was awarded the title Hero of the Soviet Union by decree of the Supreme Soviet for her courage in the war and was awarded the Florence Nightingale Medal in 1965 by the International Red Cross. She died from pneumonia in 1980 at the age of 59. Schools and streets in Belarus were named in her honor and a commemorative envelope bearing her portrait was issued by Belarus in 1992.

== Awards ==
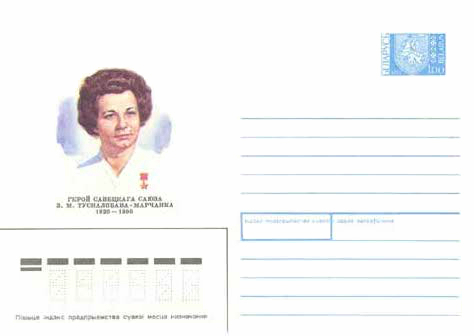
1992 Belarus envelope featuring Tusnolobova-Marchenko

- Hero of the Soviet Union (6 December 1957)
- Order of Lenin (6 December 1957)
- Order of the Red Banner (14 April 1945)
- Order of the Red Star (6 November 1942)
- Florence Nightingale Medal (12 May 1965)
- campaign and jubilee medals

== See also ==
- List of female Heroes of the Soviet Union
- Lyudmila Kravets
- Vera Kashcheyeva
