= Yelena Kolesova =

Soviet partisan (1920–1942)

- Еле́на Фёдоровна Ко́лесова
- Kolesova in her Spetnaz graduation photo
- Born: 1 August 1920; Yaroslavl Governorate, Russian Empire
- Died: 11 September 1942 (aged 22); Krupki District, Byelorussian SSR, Soviet Union
- Military career
- Allegiance: Soviet Union
- Branch: Special forces
- Service years: 1941–1942
- Unit: Spetnaz unit No. 9903
- Conflicts: World War II; Eastern Front †
- Awards: Hero of the Soviet Union

Yelena Fyodorovna Kolesova (Russian: Елена Фёдоровна Колесова; 1 August 1920 – 11 September 1942) was the commander of a partisan unit of the Soviet special forces during World War II. After dying in battle in a successful attack on a German fortress in Vydritsa, Kolesova was posthumously awarded the title Hero of the Soviet Union on 21 November 1944.

== Civilian life ==
Kolesova was born in 1920 to a Russian peasant family in the village of Kolesovo in the Yaroslavl Governorate. Her father died in 1922 and she was raised by her mother with her brothers Konstantin and Aleksander and sister Galina until she moved in with her aunt and uncle at the age of eight, who lived in the city of Moscow. After graduating from secondary school in 1936 she enrolled at the 2nd Moscow Pedagogical School, after which she worked as a gym teacher at a school in the Frunzensky district until she began working as leader of a local young pioneer detachment. She became a member of the Communist Party in 1942.

== World War II ==
After the German invasion of the Soviet Union Kolesova began working in the construction of defensive fortifications until October and assisted in the resettlement of Soviet citizens to areas further east . After repeatedly applying to join the Red Army but being rejected she was allowed to join Spetnaz unit No. 9903 in the intelligence department of the Western Front under the command of Arturs Sproģis. After brief training she and a group of several other members of the unit were deployed on 28 October 1941 to plant landmines on roads, destroy communication infrastructure, and collect military intelligence in German-occupied villages on the outskirts of Moscow. The group consisted of four men and three women; the men got into an argument while the women started planting the mines and began collecting information on troop locations and numbers. During that mission she was captured by the Germans because her Red Army boots stood out from her peasant clothing. After being held for two days she managed to escape custody during a transfer to Novaya Russa and relayed information collected to the military of the Western front. After that mission she was made commander of a group of several women whose job was to sabotage infrastructure used by the Germans in Borisov and Krupsk in the province of Minsk. In addition teaching civilians how to use explosives the small group derailed trains, bombed supply warehouses and destroyed military vehicles. They also lured German soldiers into the forest by pretending to be unmarried local women looking for a partner, only to lead them to an ambush where they were shot. German intelligence assumed the unit commanded by Kolesova to consist of approximately 600 partisans due to its destructiveness when in fact it had less than a dozen members.

Kolesova was killed in action on 11 September 1942 while leading a raid on a fortress in Krupki that proved to be successful. The eleven girls parachuted in over Borisov on the first of May, but because they had never been trained to use parachutes before three died before they could continue and one suffered a broken spinal column and died a short time later. The guerillas bombed bridges and even derailed a military train in broad daylight, but after the Germans found their campsite they had to relocate their de facto headquarters into the deep forest. On the 11 September raid she was mortally wounded while trying to take out a machine gun nest; her dying wish was to buried with the four members of her unit that died in parachuting in. She was buried in a mass grave for partisans in Migovshchina but after the end of the war her remains and those of the other four members of her unit were transferred to a grave with a memorial in Krupki. In total her detachment derailed eleven trains, killed 30 German soldiers, three cars, and bombed six police stations.

== Awards and recognition ==
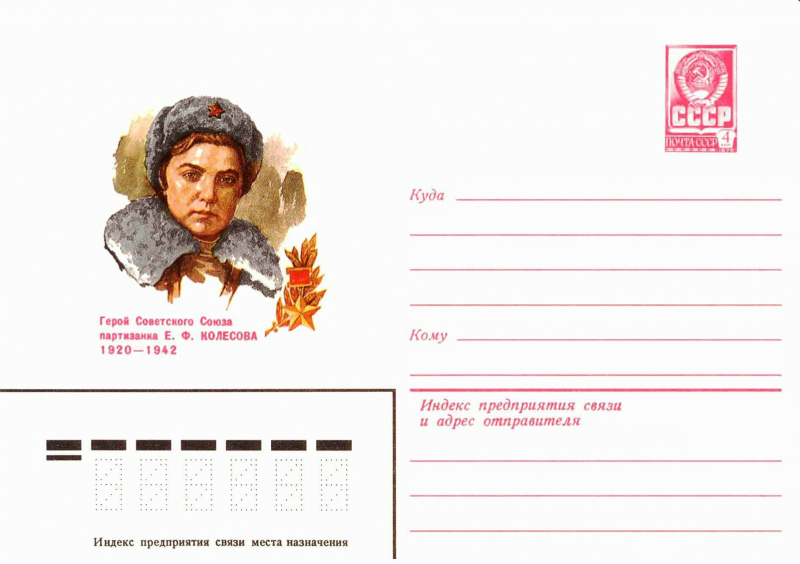
1981 Soviet envelope featuring Kolesova.

Kolesova was awarded the Order of the Red Banner on 20 January 1942, the Order of the Red Star on 1 October 1942, and the title Hero of the Soviet Union with the Order of Lenin on 21 November 1944. Monuments were dedicated to her in Krupki, Vydritsa, Mordvinova and Yaroslavl and streets were renamed in her honor in Volgograd, Krupki, Moscow, and Yaroslavl.

== See also ==
- List of female Heroes of the Soviet Union
- Nina Gnilitskaya
- Vera Kharuzhaya
