= Mariya Shkarletova =

Ukrainian Hero of the Soviet Union (1925–2003)

- Мария Савельевна Шкарлетова; Марія Савеліївна Шкарлетова
- Born: 3 February 1925; Kislovka, Kupiansk Raion, Ukrainian SSR, Soviet Union
- Died: 2 November 2003 (aged 78); Kupiansk, Ukraine
- Military career
- Allegiance: Soviet Union
- Branch: Medical Service
- Service years: 1943–1945
- Rank: Senior Sergeant
- Unit: 170th Guards Rifle Regiment
- Conflicts: World War II; Eastern Front
- Awards: Hero of the Soviet Union

Mariya Savelyevna Shkarletova (Russian: Мария Савельевна Шкарлетова, Ukrainian: Марія Савеліївна Шкарлетова; 3 February 1925 – 2 November 2003) was a field medic in the 170th Guards Rifle Regiment during World War II. During the war she participated in offensive operations in Ukraine, Moldova, and Poland for which she was awarded the title Hero of the Soviet Union on 24 March 1945.

== Early life ==
Shkarletova was born on 3 February 1925 in Kislovka to a Ukrainian peasant family. After graduating from secondary school she worked in the railroad industry and later on a collective farm until the start of the Second World War, after which she worked in the construction of defensive fortifications until German forces occupied her village in July 1942. Because German troops surrounded the city before she and the rest of her family were evacuated, she was not able to join the Red Army until Soviet troops retook control of the city in July 1943.

== Military career ==
After the Red Army retook Kupiansk Raion in 1943 Shkarletova joined the army and was sent to brief medical courses in Millerovo. After graduating from those courses in October she was deployed in the 170th Guards Rifle Regiment of the 57th Guards Rifle Division. Despite being a medic she participated in direct combat, and on several occasions led her unit in fighting on the Eastern Front. The regiment fought in multiple battles for control of strategic riverbanks on the Dnieper, Ingulets, Dniester, Southern Bug, and Vistula; in the Vistula operation near Warsaw she participated in an advance to establish a bridgehead on the right bank under heavy enemy fire. As the only medic of the landing group, she had to run under heavy artillery fire and shelling attacks to provide first aid and carry the wounded to the safety of the forest. She evacuated over 100 wounded under the cover of darkness across the Vistula River for which she was awarded the title Hero of the Soviet Union in March 1945.

== Later life ==
Shkarletova became a member of the Communist Party of the Soviet Union in 1946 and graduated from the Kupiansk Medical School in 1949. She actively participated in the reconstruction of the war-torn region employed as a nurse in the Kupiansk District Hospital. Her husband was also a veteran of the Second World War and they raised two daughters. She was later elected as a deputy of the city council and was a member of the Kharkov Red Cross regional committee. In 1965 she was awarded the Florence Nightingale Medal for her dedication to rescuing the wounded in the war. She died on 2 November 2003 in Kupiansk, Ukraine at the age of 78.

== Awards ==
- Hero of the Soviet Union (24 March 1945)
- Order of Lenin (24 March 1945)
- Order of the Patriotic War 1st class (11 March 1985)
- Order of the Red Star (28 March 1944)
- Florence Nightingale Medal (12 May 1965)
- Order of Merit 3rd class (7 May 1995)
- Order of Bohdan Khmelnytsky 3rd class (14 October 1999)
- campaign and jubilee medals

== See also ==
- List of female Heroes of the Soviet Union
- Mariya Shcherbachenko
- Lyudmila Kravets
