= Marytė Melnikaitė =

Soviet Lithuanian partisan (1923–1943)

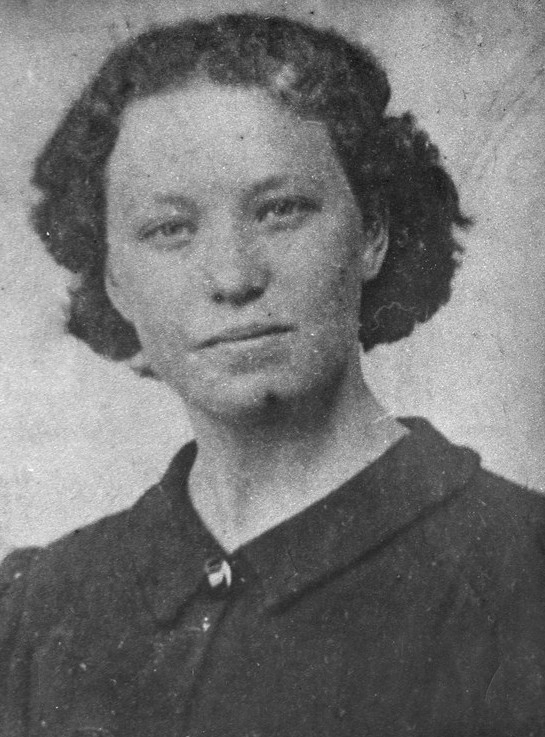
- Born: 18 March 1923; Zarasai, Lithuania
- Died: 13 July 1943 (aged 20) Kaniūkai, Ignalina District, Reichskommissariat Ostland
- Allegiance: Soviet Union
- Awards: Hero of the Soviet Union

Marytė or Marija Melnikaitė (18 March 1923 – 13 July 1943) was a Soviet partisan and the only Lithuanian woman awarded the title of Hero of the Soviet Union. While her partisan career lasted less than two months, Soviet propaganda exaggerated her duties and accomplishments. Many works, including a film and an opera, were dedicated to her. Several streets in the former Soviet Union (including Tyumen, Minsk, Almaty, Shymkent) are still named after her.

== Early life ==
Melnikaitė was born to a family of a Russian mother Antonina Illarionovna and a Lithuanian father Juozas Melnikas in Zarasai. She had four other siblings and the parents took assorted jobs to provide for the large family. They moved frequently in search for jobs (Zarasai, Anykščiai, Rokiškis, Zarasai, Marijampolė). Melnikaitė completed a primary school in Rokiškis and started working at Avanti confectionery at age 14 and studied sewing. In 1940, after Lithuania was occupied by the Soviet Union, Melnikaitė joined the Lithuanian Komsomol and started evening classes. Reportedly her father did not approve her Komsomol activities, which included her singing in a choir.

== Partisan activities ==
After the German invasion of the Soviet Union, Melnikaitė along with other Komsomol members was evacuated to Russia where she took a job at a machine tool plant in Tyumen. In July 1942, she joined the Soviet Army (16th Rifle Division) and was sent to a saboteur school in Balakhna. In May 1943, she finished the studies and together with 35 other partisans (including two other women) were airlifted to the Rasony District in Belarus. From there, they needed to travel on foot to partisan headquarters in forests near Kaziany. Melnikaitė and a few others were assigned to the native Zarasai where she joined the Soviet partisan group Kęstutis under the name of Ona Kuosaitė.

Melnikaitė's partisan life lasted less than two months. Her Soviet biographers claimed that she participated in sabotage operations that derailed German trains carrying weapons to the front lines or bombed German warehouses. There is some evidence of only one diversion where a small train carrying gravel and sugar was derailed. In July 1943, she and several other partisans were sent on a mission to bring more weapons from the Soviet partisans operating in Belarus. Local inhabitants spotted the group near Apvardai Lake in Ignalina District and called Lithuanian policemen. During a shootout, several partisans were killed. There is reliable evidence of only one policeman (Igoris Kazanas) who was killed by the partisans. Melnikaitė and a man (likely Fatėjus Sapožnikovas) were captured and their custody was transferred to the German police. After five days of torture, they were shot in the cemetery of Kaniūkai village. Since Melnikaitė's family was not repressed while Sapožnikovas' and other partisans' families were killed or arrested, it is likely that Melninkaitė did not give up her real identity.

Her story was rediscovered in spring 1944 when Motiejus Šumauskas, leader of Lithuanian Soviet partisans, searched for a Lithuanian version of Zoya Kosmodemyanskaya. Melnikaitė was posthumously awarded the title Hero of the Soviet Union on 22 March 1944. The death of the twenty-year-old was used by Soviet propaganda, which exaggerated her duties, accomplishments, and circumstances of her death. For example, in March 1944, Antanas Sniečkus wrote in Tiesa that the shootout lasted a day and that Melnikaitė personally killed seven policemen, was badly injured, attempted to commit suicide with a grenade, and even after brutal torture did not betray her fellow partisans. Her first biographer Antanas Venclova later admitted in his memoirs that he was given just the basic facts (name, dates of birth and death, and a few words on the circumstances of her death) and a deadline of next morning to produce her heroic biography. Until 1965, when documents were discovered that proved she was shot, her biographers claimed that she was publicly hanged and that her last words praised the Lithuanian SSR and comrade Stalin.

== Honors and memorials ==
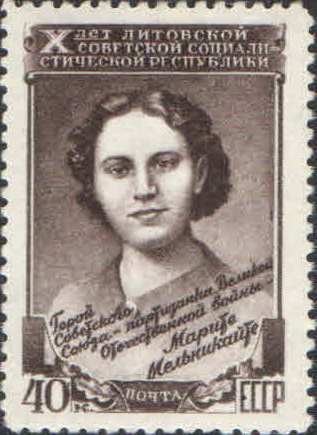
1950 Soviet postage stamp featuring Melnikaitė

- Memorial museum in Zarasai (1969); closed
- Monument in Druskininkai (1952); sculptor Robertas Antinis, currently located in Grūtas Park
- Monument in Zarasai (1955); sculptor Juozas Mikėnas, currently located in Grūtas Park. Her remains were reburied under the monument; in 1991 they were reburied again in Zarasai cemetery next to her family.
- Plaque on the intersection of Melnikaitė and Republic streets in Tyumen
- Plaque on the machine tool plant in Tyumen (the former factory "Mechanic")
- Film Marytė by Mosfilm (1947); directed by Vera Stroyeva, small debut role of Donatas Banionis
- Opera Marytė by Lithuanian Opera and Ballet Theatre (1953); directed by Antanas Račiūnas
- Essay Tarybų Sąjungos Didvyrė Marija Melnikaitė by Antanas Venclova (1944)
- Poems Marija Melnikaitė by Salomėja Nėris, Lietuvos duktė by Vacys Reimeris, Tam krašte by Vladas Mozūriūnas
- One of the main streets in Tyumen was named in her honor; also streets in Minsk, Almaty, and Shymkent
- Textile company in Utena was named in her honor; renamed to Utenos trikotažas in 1995
- Kolkhozes in Dotnuva (the first in the Lithuanian SSR) and several others were named in her honor

== See also ==
- List of female Heroes of the Soviet Union
- Helene Kullman
- Aniela Krzywoń
