= Galina Petrova =

Hero of the Soviet Union

Galina Konstantinovna Petrova
- Галина Костянтинівна Петрова
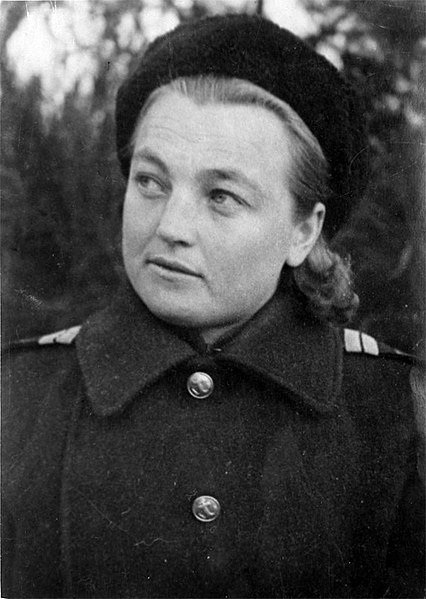
- Born: 9 September 1920; Mykolaiv, Ukrainian SSR, Soviet Union
- Died: 4 December 1943 (aged 23); Eltigen, Crimean ASSR, Soviet Union
- Military career
- Allegiance: Soviet Union
- Branch: Soviet Navy
- Service years: 1942–1943
- Rank: Glavny starshina
- Unit: 386th Independent Naval Infantry Battalion
- Conflicts: World War II; Eastern Front †
- Awards: Hero of the Soviet Union

Galina Petrova (Russian: Галина Петрова; Ukrainian: Галина Петрова, romanized: Halyna Petrova; 9 September 1920 – 4 December 1943) was a combat medic and Chief Petty Officer in the 386th Independent Naval Infantry Battalion of the Black Sea Fleet during the Second World War. She died during a bombing attack on 4 December 1943 less than a month after she was awarded the title Hero of the Soviet Union and the Order of Lenin on 17 November 1943 for her bravery in the Kerch-Eltigen operation.

== Early life ==
Petrova was born on 9 September 1920 to a Russian family in Mykolaiv, Ukrainian SSR in the Soviet Union. In 1940 after she graduated from secondary school with honors she entered the Forestry Department of the Novocherkassk Engineering Institute in Rostov. After the German invasion of the Soviet Union she entered nursing courses in Krasnodar.

== Military career ==
After graduating nursing courses Petrova entered the Soviet Navy as a nurse in 1942. She was present in the Kerch-Eltigen operation in 1943 with the rest of the Black Sea Fleet. On the night of 1 November she carried over twenty wounded soldiers from the battlefield in the night under the cover of darkness, running through a field of barbed wire and mines to reach numerous injured marines. For her bravery in the offensive she was awarded the title Hero of the Soviet Union in November by decree of the Presidium of the Supreme Soviet. Less than a month after she received the award she was injured while holding back German soldiers in a series of following counterattacks in Eltigen on 3 December. She was taken to a hospital for her injuries but died the next day when the school building used as a hospital was bombed. Her remains were interred in the village of heroes in Crimea.

== Recognition ==
There are memorial plaques dedicated to her memory in Novocherkassk and South Russian State Polytechnic University as well as streets named in her honor in Sevastopol, Tuapse, Mykolaiv, and the village of heroes in Kerch. Monuments in her likeness are present at the forestry institute where she studied and at the medical school in Kerch named after her.

== See also ==
- List of female Heroes of the Soviet Union
- Yekaterina Mikhailova-Demina
- Fedora Pushina
