= Yefrosinya Zenkova =

Soviet Belarusian partisan (1923–1984)

- Ефрасіння Зянькова
- Born: 22 December 1923; Ushaly village, Byelorussian SSR, Soviet Union (now Belarus)
- Died: 19 April 1984 (aged 60); Vitebsk, Byelorussian SSR, Soviet Union (now Belarus)
- Awards: Hero of the Soviet Union

Yefrosinya Savelyevna Zenkova (Belarusian: Ефрасіння Савельеўна Зянькова, romanized: Jefrasinnia Saveljeǔna Ziankova, Russian: Ефроси́нья Саве́льевна Зенько́ва; 22 December 1923 – 19 April 1984) was a Soviet Belarusian partisan who was secretary of the underground Komsomol resistance organization nicknamed the "Young Avengers" during the Second World War. She was declared a Hero of the Soviet Union on 1 July 1958 by decree of the Supreme Soviet.

== Early life ==
Zenkova was born on 22 December 1923 to a Belarusian peasant family in Ushaly village, located within the present-day Shumilina District in the Vitebsk Region of Belarus. After completing secondary school, she attended a vocational school before working as a seamstress at a garment factory in Vitebsk. She later began studying at the local Technical Clothing School, but the school building was bombed by the German Luftwaffe on the day of the students' evaluations.

== World War II activities ==
After the German invasion of the Soviet Union in the summer of 1941, Zenkova initially worked in civil defense activities, rescuing people from collapsed buildings and removing unexploded ordnances from streets and rooftops. When the city was surrounded by enemy forces, she did not leave immediately, as she was helping other people with the evacuation. When she tried to escape the city for Soviet-controlled territory, she was detained by the Germans but managed to escape their custody. She then ran away on a week-long journey to the small village where she was born. Not long after arriving in her hometown of Ushaly, German forces took control of the area and began seizing the villagers' property, especially food and livestock. While she was eager to join the ranks of the partisan detachment named after Kliment Voroshilov, which her brother was a member of, but in March 1942, she was asked by the detachment's commissar to form a Komsomol cell near the strategically important railroad junction in Obol, five kilometers away from Ushaly to provide them with information on German military activities in the area. Zenkova agreed, and the commissar gave her a list of people to recruit and leaflets to spread among them. With herself being only 18 years old at the time of forming the organization as well as many of the new recruits being even younger teenagers, with the youngest member being only 15, the group came to be known as the "Young Avengers". In August 1943, one of the group's members, 17-year-old Zinaida Portnova, managed to get a job working in the kitchen of a German mess hall, and subsequently poisoned the soup that was being prepared, killing dozens of enemy soldiers.

In order to better monitor activities at the Obol railroad junction, Zenkova got a job working as an assistant to an accountant at the station and another partisan, Nikolai Alekseyev, found work as the station switchman. When Alekseyev found a shipment of tanks in one of the trains, he quickly transferred the information up the chain of command to Moscow, and the Soviet Air Force sent out bombers to destroy the shipment. The partisans themselves also directly engaged in arms stockpiling and sabotage, causing the collision of a train full of SS men with a resupply train. When Zenkova was provided with magnetic mines, she found creative ways to hide them for delivery, even baking one info a loaf of bread to avoid detection. One mine she had given to a partisan was placed under the car of a high-ranking SS official, and ended up killing him and three other SS members in the car. They also blew up a power plant, a brick factory, a pumping station, a flax processing factory, and mined a highway in addition to removing pieces of train-track at vital areas. After the group was betrayed to the Germans by a member, mass arrests ensued; Zenkova survived because she had been away in Polotsk at the time the arrests began. When she began returning from Polotsk, Arkady Barbashov warned her of what was happening and the two managed to escape to join the V.I. Lenin Sirotinsk Partisan Brigade. Because the Germans could not find Zenkova, they arrested her mother Marfa instead and executed her in her daughter's place as a form of collective punishment.

== Later life ==
After the war, Zenkova raised the three children of a relative who had died in the war and became a member of the Communist Party in 1945. As an instructor in the District Komosmol Committee Zenkova assisted in the reconstruction of the city that had been badly damaged during the war. In 1967, she changed jobs and worked at the city military recruitment center. She was a popular public speaker, speaking at factories, schools, and military units. In 1958, she was declared a Hero of the Soviet Union and in 1976 declared an Honorary Citizen of Vitebsk. With her health deteriorating, she died in 1984 at the age of 60 and was buried in the Mazurin Cemetery of Vitebsk.

== Awards and honors ==
- Hero of the Soviet Union (1 July 1958)
- Order of Lenin (1 July 1958)
- Order of the Red Star (15 August 1944)
- victory and jubilee medals
- Honorary Citizen of Vitebsk (1976)

== See also ==
- List of female Heroes of the Soviet Union
- Soviet partisans
- Zinaida Portnova
