= Helene Kullman =

Estonian intelligence agent in Soviet service

- Born: 31 January 1920; Tartu, Estonia
- Died: 6 March 1943 (aged 23) / 1978; Tartu, Estonia / West Germany
- Military career
- Allegiance: Soviet Union
- Branch: Reconnaissance
- Service years: 1942–1943
- Rank: Junior Political Instructor
- Nickname: Leen Kullman
- Units: Baltic Fleet; 7th Infantry Division (Partisan)
- Conflicts: World War II †
- Awards: Hero of the Soviet Union

Helene "Leen" Kullman (31 January 1920 – 6 March 1943 or 1978) was an Estonian agent of Soviet military intelligence in the Baltic Fleet during World War II.

== Early life ==
Kullman was born on 31 January 1920 to an Estonian family in Tartu; she was the sixth of eight children of a shoemaker. Her father died in 1933, the same year she left secondary school and enrolled in the Tallinn Pedagogical School. After Estonia was annexed by the Soviet Union in 1940 she joined the Komsomol, having graduated from the Tallinn Pedagogical School in 1937, after which she enrolled in the Tallinn Pedagogical Seminary. She became certified as a junior secondary school teacher in 1941, shortly before the German invasion of the Soviet Union.

== World War II activities ==
After the German invasion of the Soviet Union Kullman was assigned by the Komsomol to help people evacuate Tallinn during the night. She was evacuated from the city on 28 August 1941 with her twin sister Anna to a collective farm in the Chelyabinsk Oblast of Russia. After the creation of the 7th Estonian Division in December 1941 she soon joined in 1942 and was assigned to a medical battalion as a nurse until she was transferred to the intelligence directorate in April 1942. In September 1942, she was dropped by parachuted behind German lines in the forest near Tartu. She then began to radio information on the locations and numbers of enemy garrisons, defences, and ships in addition to information about the presence and degree of ice in areas of the Baltic. In January 1943, she was arrested by the local Gestapo and subsequently shot by a prison guard after she spat in his face according to Soviet sources. She was declared a Hero of the Soviet Union on 8 May 1965.

== Speculation ==
In 2000, the Estonian newspaper Postimees reported that Helene may have in fact cooperated with her captors and turned double-agent, continuing her radio transmissions, and then after the war relocated to West Germany under a new identity where she lived until 1978. No real evidence has been provided to support this speculation.

== See also ==
- List of female Heroes of the Soviet Union
- Tatyana Marinenko
- Marytė Melnikaitė

== Sources ==
- Лурье, Вячеслав Михайлович; Валерий Яковлевич Кочик (2003). ГРУ: дела и люди (Россия в лицах). Олма-Пресс. pp. lk. 419. ISBN 5-7654-1499-0.
