= Mariya Shcherbachenko =

Soviet combat medic (1922–2016)

- Марія Захарівна Щербаченко
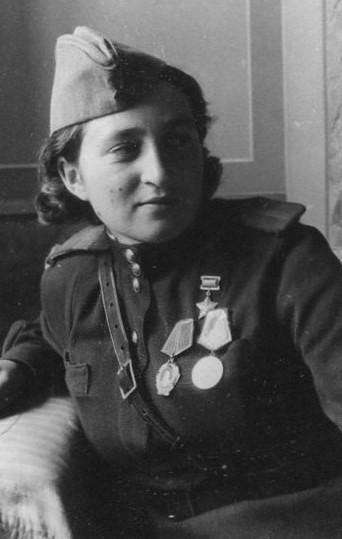
- Born: 14 February 1922; Yefremovka, Kharkov Governorate, Ukrainian SSR
- Died: 23 November 2016 (aged 94); Kyiv, Ukraine
- Military career
- Allegiance: Soviet Union
- Branch: Main Military Medical Directorate
- Service years: 1943–1945
- Rank: Starshina
- Unit: 835th Rifle Regiment
- Conflicts: World War II; Eastern Front
- Awards: Hero of the Soviet Union

Mariya Zakharovna Shcherbachenko (Ukrainian: Марія Захарівна Щербаченко, Russian: Мария Захаровна Щербаченко; 14 February 1922 – 23 November 2016) was a combat medic in the Red Army during World War II, referred to by the Soviets as the Great Patriotic War. She was awarded the title Hero of the Soviet Union on 23 October 1943 for being one of the first 13 soldiers to cross the Dnieper.

== Prewar life ==
Shcherbachenko was born on 14 February 1922 to a Ukrainian peasant family in the village of Yefremovka (Ukrainian: Yefremivka) in the Kharkov Governorate. Her older brother Andrey raised her after the death of both of their parents. Upon graduating from secondary school she worked as an accountant's assistant on a collective farm in her village.

== World War II ==
Shcherbachenko hid during the German occupation of her village to avoid being deported and forced to conduct hard labor. Soviet troops expelled German forces from Yefremovka in February 1943, after which she worked in the construction of defensive structures on the Donets river until joining the Red Army in March. She then underwent medical training in Samarkand before she was deployed as part of the 835th Rifle Regiment of the 237th Rifle Division in July.

On 24 September 1943 she was one of the first 13 soldiers to reach the right bank of the Dnieper River, doing so under heavy enemy fire in the village of Grebeni in the Kyiv oblast. Throughout ten days of intense battle she rescued 112 injured soldiers from the battlefield, providing first aid and transporting them back across the river to a medical center. In the beginning of the offensive she operated a machine gun in battle. On 23 October 1943 she was awarded the title Hero of the Soviet Union by decree of the Presidium of the Supreme Soviet for her actions in the Dnieper battle. After receiving the title she continued to serve on the frontlines until being recalled from the front in May 1944 to give a speech at the 3rd Youth Anti-Fascist Rally in Moscow. After speaking at the rally she was sent to study at the Kharkov Military Medical School, which had been relocated to Ashgabat, Turkmenistan due to the war; however, she did not graduate from the school.

== Postwar ==
After the war she left the military. She then graduated from Tashkent Law School and worked as a lawyer in Kyiv. For her dedication to rescuing the wounded in battle she was awarded the Florence Nightingale Medal by the International Red Cross in 1973. She died in Kyiv on 23 November 2016 at the age of 94 and was buried in the Kyiv Lukyanivske Military Cemetery.

== Awards ==
- Hero of the Soviet Union (23 October 1943)
- Order of Lenin (23 October 1943)
- Order of the Patriotic War 1st class (11 March 1985)
- Medal "For Courage" (9 October 1943)
- Florence Nightingale Medal (12 May 1971)
- Order of Merit (2nd class - 5 March 1997; 3rd class - 6 October 1994)
- Order of Bohdan Khmelnytsky 3rd Class (14 October 1999)
- Campaign and jubilee medals

== See also ==
- List of female Heroes of the Soviet Union
- Vera Kashcheyeva
- Lyudmila Kravets
