= Tatyana Marinenko =

Soviet Belarusian partisan (1920–1942)

Tatyana Savelyevna Marinenko
- Native name: Таццяна Савельеўна Марыненка
- Born: 25 January 1920 Sukhoi Bor, Byelorussian Soviet Socialist Republic
- Died: 2 August 1942 (aged 22) Zhartsy, Byelorussian SSR, Soviet Union
- Allegiance: Soviet Union
- Branch: NKVD; Soviet partisans
- Battles / wars: World War II (executed)
- Awards: Hero of the Soviet Union

Tatyana Savelyevna Marinenko (Belarusian: Таццяна Савельеўна Марыненка; Russian: Татьяна Савельевна Мариненко; 25 January 1920 – 2 August 1942) was a Soviet partisan and intelligence officer of the NKVD during the Second World War. After she was captured and tortured by the Germans in 1942 she was posthumously declared a Hero of the Soviet Union on 8 May 1965.

== Early life ==
Marinenko was born on 25 January 1920 to a Belarusian peasant family in the small village of Sukhoi Bor in what is now Polotsk district, present-day Belarus. After completing secondary school she entered the Polotsk Pedagogical School where she graduated in 1939, not long before the German invasion of the Soviet Union. She worked as a teacher in a secondary school in the village of Zelenka in Polotsk and was a member of the Komsomol.

== World War II ==
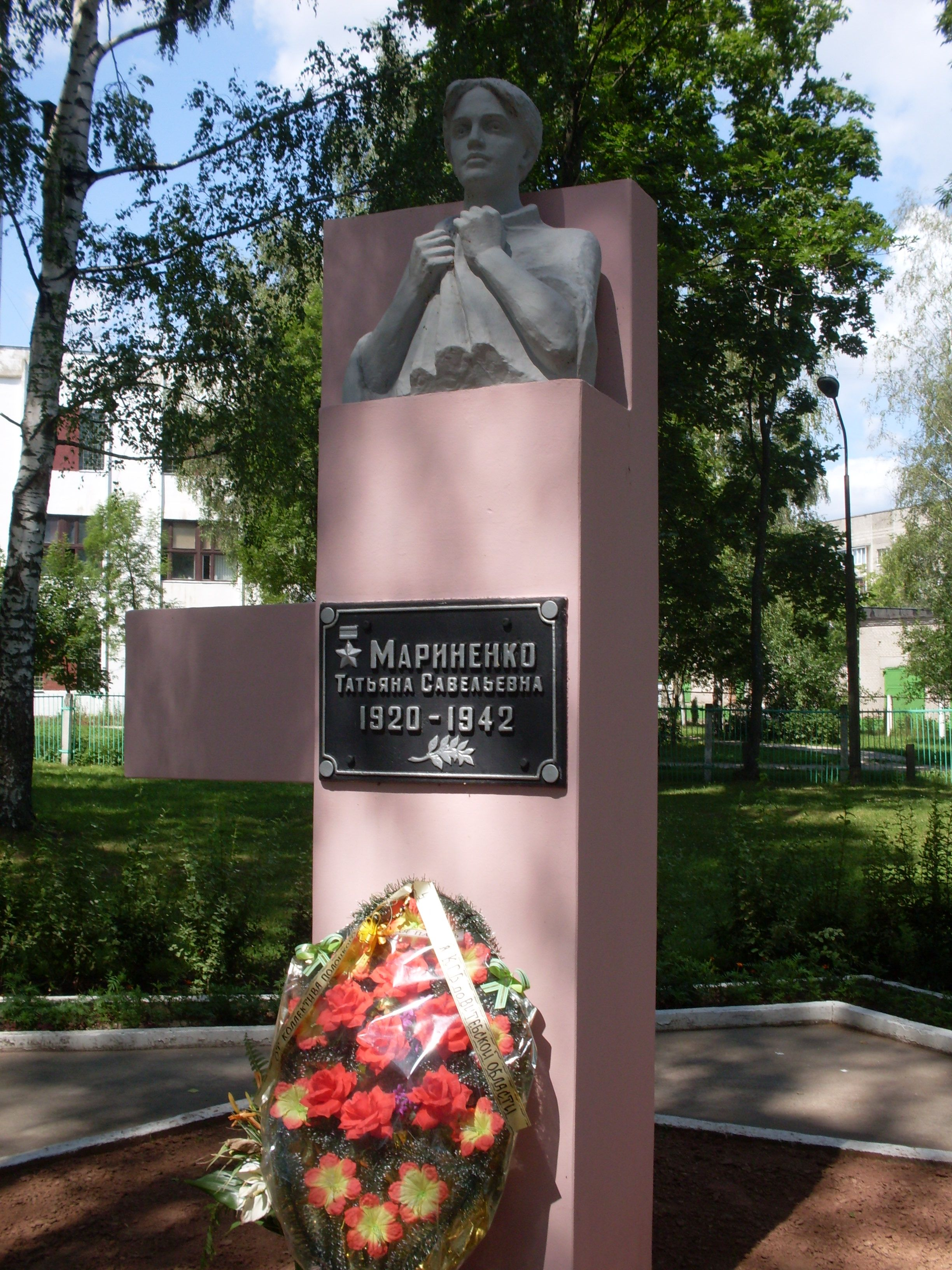
Bust of Marinenko in Polotsk

The schoolteacher began working as a partisan reconnaissance scout for the NKVD when the Germans invaded and occupied Polotsk. Under the pseudonym "Василёк" (English: Cornflower) she relayed information about the locations of Axis garrisons and troops to the Red Army until a traitor in her unit informed the Germans of their activities. Marinenko and her 14-year-old brother, who was also a partisan, were shot by the Axis after three days of interrogation and torture along with 28 other villagers who were part of the resistance. She was buried in the village of Zharci, Polotsk.

== Death and recognition ==
Marinenko was not awarded the title Hero of the Soviet Union until 1965 on the 20th anniversary of the end of the war, when the Supreme Soviet was awarded the title to partisans and soldiers killed in action whose feats had not been made public until after the war. Her portrait was installed in a museum in Belarus with a plaque describing her as the "Belorussian Zoya" and describing her feat as that of Zoya Kosmodemyanskaya, who was one of the most revered Heroines of the Soviet Union during the Great Patriotic War. A monument to Marinenko (pictured) was installed in Polotsk in addition to multiple schools named in her honor.

== See also ==
- List of female Heroes of the Soviet Union
- Zoya Kosmodemyanskaya
- Nina Gnilitskaya
- Soviet partisans
