= Aniela Krzywoń =

Polish soldier

- Born: 27 May 1925; Puźniki, Second Polish Republic
- Died: 12 October 1943 (aged 18); Lenino, Byelorussian SSR, Soviet Union
- Military career
- Allegiance: Poland
- Branch: Infantry
- Unit: "Emilia Plater" Independent Women's Battalion
- Awards: Hero of the Soviet Union; Order of Lenin; Virtuti Militari 5th Class

Aniela Krzywoń (27 May 1925 – 12 October 1943) was a private in the "Emilia Plater" Independent Women's Battalion of the Polish People's Army during the Second World War and became the only woman in history who was not a citizen of the Soviet Union to be awarded the USSR's highest honor for bravery, the title Hero of the Soviet Union, after she died of injuries sustained while rescuing important military documents from a burning truck after a Luftwaffe bombing raid.

== Early life ==
Krzywoń was born in the village of Puźniki, then located in the Second Polish Republic; the area the village once was in currently located within present-day Ukraine since it had become part of the Ukrainian SSR in 1939. Her father fought in the Polish–Soviet War; after their village became part of Ukraine the Krzywoń family and many other Polish families that had been deemed "politically unreliable" were forcibly deported to the Irkutsk Oblast of Siberia and later relocated to the city of Kansk. There Aniela began working as a machinist at a local timber mill until she voluntarily joined the army in 1943 to fight in World War II.

== Military career ==
Krzywoń joined the 1st Tadeusz Kościuszko Infantry Division of the Polish People's Army on 29 May 1943 and was assigned to the "Emilia Plater" Independent Women's Battalion. She was trained in the use of submachine guns and grenades as well as hand-to-hand combat. On 12 October 1943 the battalion was forced to retreat after they saw their baptism by fire in the Lenino village of the Byelorussian SSR. While Krzywoń was accompanying a truck carrying the wounded and important documents from headquarters they were attacked by a Luftwaffe raid. Krzywoń ran into the burning vehicle, carrying out the wounded soldiers and staff as well as rescuing the important documents from the fire. Inside the burning vehicle she died from her injuries. For her heroism she was posthumously awarded the highest Polish and Soviet decorations – the Virtuti Militari of Poland and the title Hero of the Soviet Union. She was the first and only Polish female decorated with the Gold Star of the Hero of the Soviet Union, and the only woman ever awarded the title that was not a Soviet citizen.

== See also ==
- List of female Heroes of the Soviet Union
- Polish People's Army
- Fedora Pushina
