= Valentina Safronova =

Soviet partisan and intelligence officer (1918–1943)

Valentina Ivanovna Safronova
- Native name: Валентина Ивановна Сафронова
- Born: 1918; Baksheevo village, Oryol Governorate, Russian Empire
- Died: 1943 (aged 24–25) Bryansk, Oryol Oblast, Soviet Union
- Allegiance: Soviet Union
- Awards: Hero of the Soviet Union; Order of Lenin; Order of the Red Star

Valentina Ivanovna Safronova (Russian: Валентина Ивановна Сафронова; 1918 – 1 May 1943) was a Soviet partisan and intelligence officer who engaged in reconnaissance and sabotage until she was captured and killed by the Gestapo. On 8 May 1965, over twenty years after her death, she was posthumously awarded the title Hero of the Soviet Union.

== Early life ==
Safronova was born in 1918 to a Russian family in the village of Baksheevo, Oryol Gobernorate, but her family moved to village of Lgovsky shortly after her birth, and in 1921 the village was officially incorporated into the city of Bryansk proper. After completing school she worked as the leader of a pioneer detachment and later as a supervisor in a small savings bank that was later used as hideout by resistance members during German occupation. She was also a member of the Komsomol.

== World War II ==
Not long after the German invasion of the Soviet Union Safronova began working as a partisan intelligence officer for the Kratsov Braynsk Partisan Detachment. In early September 1941 she participated on a mission where the unit parachuted into the Kletnya forest behind enemy lines, after which they engaged in several ambushes and sabotage operations while gathering intelligence, requiring her to cross the front lines on numerous occasions.

After the Germans constructed a new theater in her hometown of Bryansk she and her fellow partisans hatched a plan to disrupt the opening ceremony. While the mayor was giving a speech another partisan turned off the lights so they could toss around anti-Axis pamphlets; after the brief incident Safronova ran away to the bathroom. While leaving the theater she accepted a ride from a German officer she knew and used that opportunity to pinpoint the location of a German airfield as well as what types of defenses the Luftwaffe aircraft were equipped with after she was made to work shoveling snow at the airfield. After she relayed the information to Soviet Intelligence, bombers were able to destroy 58 German aircraft and five anti-aircraft batteries based on the information she had collected. Later she transmitted information on the locations of fuel depots, ammunition storage facilities, and the schedules of German trains.

On one of her most successful missions she and a partisan dressed as a German police officer delivered a crate of TNT from Moscow to Byransk, which was used to attack a factory that produced tanks and motor vehicles. Under her leadership the partisan unit increased to 50 members and maintained ten safehouses across the city. The unit derailed trains, sabotaged cars and communications systems, laid landmines, and killed German soldiers. Eventually German military intelligence managed to acquire a photograph of Safronova and increased their efforts to capture her.

After the Byansk partisans' radio broke in February 1942 a crew of seven partisans, with Safronova the only female member, made their way on foot Belev (over 100 kilometers away) which was not occupied by the Germans in order to hand over maps and other important documents about enemy military activities to the Red Army. On the route the partisans escaped German military patrols twice, walked through deep snow, and destroyed field fortifications with a machine gun. Only a week after delivering the documents she suffered a severe concussion on 16 March 1942 and was sent to a Soviet hospital, but parachuted with supplies from Moscow into German-occupied territory immediately after recovering in May. The day after she parachuted in the detachment was confronted by a German search party; during the confrontation Safronova took over the duties of a machine gunner.

Throughout Spring 1942 many partisans from her unit were wounded during intense fighting. Safronova found herself in the hospital again after suffering repercussions from her previous head injury. While in the Monino hospital she learned that she had been awarded the Order of the Red Star. After leaving the hospital she toured Soviet controlled territory and was gifted with a brand new submachine gun from the Ivanovo Kosmosol Committee. Shortly after she flew back to Bryansk from Moscow she and two other partisans, one of whom was her company commander, got lost in the forest while searching for the rest of the detachment, which had recently retreated after heavy battle. While staying in an abandoned dugout to survive the winter cold the three were discovered by German forces and taken hostage. Safronova attempted to resist capture by firing on them with her submachine gun, but eventually lost consciousness from wounds. After she was taken to Glinnoye village by her captors she was transferred to the custody of the Bryansk Gestapo. Her head injury was treated by a German doctor in hopes that she would remember more information, but she refused to take any medicine for it. The circumstances surrounding her death are unclear, but some accounts claim she was tortured to death on 1 May 1943.

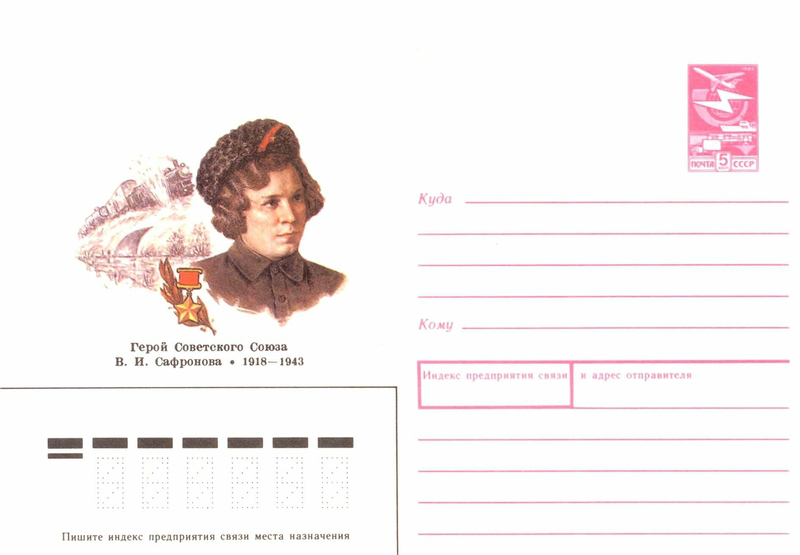
1989 Soviet envelope featuring portrait of Safronova.

== Recognition ==
A street and secondary school in Bryansk were named in honor of Safronova. By decree of the Supreme Soviet she was posthumously awarded the title Hero of the Soviet Union in 1965, over twenty years after her death. In 1970 a monument in her likeness was placed in Bryansk, and in 1989 a Soviet envelope featuring her portrait (pictured) was issued.

== See also ==
- List of female Heroes of the Soviet Union
- Soviet partisans
