= Anastasiya Biseniek =

Soviet partisan (1899–1943)

Anastasiya Alexandrovna Biseniek
- Анастасия Александровна Бисениек
- Born: Anastasiya Finogenova; 1899; Dno, Russian Empire
- Died: 13 October 1943 (aged 43–44); Zapolyansky death camp, Pskov Oblast, German-occupied Soviet Union
- Awards: Hero of the Soviet Union; Order of Lenin

Anastasiya Alexandrovna Biseniek (Russian: Анастаси́я Алекса́ндровна Бисениек; 1899 – 1943) was the leader of the Dno Soviet partisan organization of the Pskov region who transferred information for scouts and partisans in addition to providing weapons and explosives. As an employee at the depot of a railroad junction she was able to help partisans sabotage much-needed equipment for the Germans. On 8 May 1965 she was awarded the title Hero of the Soviet Union, over twenty years after she was executed in the Zapolyansky death camp.

== Pre-war life ==
Anastasiya Biseniek was born in 1899 in the city of Dno, then part of the Russian Empire to a large Russian family; she had four brothers and three sisters. Her father, Aleksander Pavelovich Finogenov, worked at the Dno-1 Railway Station. In 1914 he was drafted into the Imperial Russian Army but was soon demobilized after he was injured during the Russian Civil War, after which he worked as a master shoemaker and repaired boots. After completing primary school Anastasiya worked at the rail station until 1914 when her father left for the army and arranged for her to move to Petrograd to work at a clothing factory. In 1917, just several days before the October Revolution, her lover who she had met while working in Petrograd was killed during a night patrol; he was a Bolshevik.

In 1919 Anastasiya returned to Dno and got a job working at a boarding school, and in 1921 married a Latvian refugee Fyodor Biseniek. She took on his surname and the couple soon had their first child, Yura. In 1922 Fyodor was granted permission to return to Latvia, and he immediately left for Latvia to visit his family without telling Anastasiya. In search for her husband she illegally left the Soviet Union for Latvia, where they reconnected and Anastasiya eventually birthed a son Konstantine ten years later. Through personal connections to high-ranking officials such as Mikhail Kalinin she managed to return to Dno, where she found employment working at a freight station and later as a rail conductor. In 1937 she was arrested by the NKVD during the Great Purge for having left the Soviet Union, but was released until 6 June 1938 when she was arrested again and sentenced to ten years in prison on 27 October for violating Article 58. On 18 September 1939 the case was dismissed and the ruling was revoked. After she was released she met Vasily Zinovev, who later became the commander of her partisan unit.

== Partisan activities ==
=== Partisan activities in the Dno area ===
On 18 July 1941, when the district committee of the Communist Party worried about the possibility of the 22nd Rifle Corps retreating from the ongoing German offensive, the party formed a partisan detachment. Zinovev was eventually appointed commander of the unit, a party member named Timokin became the commissar, and Anastasiya's oldest son Yura became a guerilla in the unit. Before the unit left the city of Dno to fight approaching Germans the leadership of the unit contacted Anastasiya, asking her to serve as leader of the part of the unit that stayed in Dno. Her job would be to organize observation of the situation in the city and at the railway station, pass information on to partisans who had occasionally left the forest, hold meetings in her apartment, and disrupt German communication and transportation equipment in order to hinder the German advance on Leningrad. Sympathetic to the efforts to resist the Leningrad blockade, Anastasiya was happy to facilitate the resistance. To do so she would have to remain in the city, and when she was given an opportunity to evacuate the city with her young son she refused; just one day later on 19 July the city was taken over by German troops.

On her first trip to the locomotive depot after the German occupation of the city she met up with a former soldier of the White Army who fought in the Russian civil war, and was already collaborating with the Germans. Knowing that Anastasiya had been previously arrested by the NKVD, he wrongfully assumed that Anastasiya would happily collaborate with the Nazis and invited her to join the new German administration. Seeing an opportunity to collect more information, she pretended to agree with the plan.

After the German administration permitted bazaars to be set up every Sunday. On one of the first days the market was open Anastasiya's sister Yevgenia, who was a schoolteacher in the city of Lukomo, brought pamphlets to the apartment. At the request of Anastasiya she kept an eye on the movements of German troops and reported the information back to Anastasiya; she also distributed Soviet pamphlets to mechanics at the village locomotive depot who were forced to repair vehicles for the Germans. On every visit to Anastasiya Yevgenia Anastasiya distributed the leaflets at the station where she worked and wrote for an underground newspaper circulated locally, titled "Dnovets".

Anastasia recruited and trained two young Komsomol members to the partisan unit, Zinaida Egorova and Nina Karabanova. Zina Egorova had worked as a telephone operator at a military base before the war, and later as a waitress in a mess hall at a German airfield, where she communicated with pilots and technical personnel. She had complied document of the information she collected, and later sent it to the intelligence service of the Red Army. The information helped the Red Army attack the headquarters of the airfield. Nina Karabanova, who was in secondary school at the time, worked as a job as a janitor at a German military base. Later she made contact with Soviet prisoners of war and provided them with food, civilian clothes, medicine, and Soviet leaflets; When one of the prisoners of war asked Anastasiya for help she had Nina provide him with a map and compass, which was used by a group of prisoners of war to escape. Subsequently, Nina contacted underground resistance members in the village of Skugra, where escape of prisoners of war and their transfer to a partisan detachment was organized.

Through communications with schoolteacher E. Ivanov, Biseniek established connections with the partisan-controlled village of Botanog. In 1942, partisan intelligence agent Dmitri Yakovlev, who worked as a machinist before the war and escaped from German captivity traveled to Biseniek's apartment to meet his parents; but he did not carry any required identification documents with him. When a group of German police officers approached him and asked to see his papers, one of the policemen realized he was a fugitive and arrested him. Yakovlev's arrest alarmed Anastasia, and after his arrest Yevgenia asked Anastasiya to leave the city of Dno for her own safety but she refused, realizing that if she did leave the Nazis would arrest all of her relatives and anyone she had previously spoken to. Not long after Yakovlev's arrest, Anastasiya and Yevgenia were summoned by the Germans for interrogation and then shown to the beaten Yakovlev to see if Yakovlev might recognize them. However, Yakovlev denied any acquaintance with the two. Anastasiya and her sister were permitted to leave but after leaving Yakolev was shot.

On 4 January 1943 Anastasiya had her youngest son Konstantin go skiing near the railway bridge several kilometers from the city to find out the positions of Germans defenses on the bridge and their numbers. While skiing he was seen by a German soldier whole opened fire on him with an automatic rifle, but Konstantin was not hurt in the incident even after one of the bullets fired at him split his ski in half. Several days later paratroopers destroyed the German guns mounted to the bridge, but Anastasiya did not let Konstantin go on any more scouting missions after she suspected her eldest son Yura was killed in combat.

=== Connections with the Zinoviev detachment ===
She later established connections with the partisan unit named after V. I. Zinoviev through her son Yura, who had provided her with information about the detachment, which was located on the outskirts of the city near lake Beli at the time. Anastasiya then told her son about the state of affairs in the area, specifically the locations of the commandant's office, the security company, and the improvised airfield with camouflaged anti-aircraft guns protecting a depot as well as names of local villagers who collaborated with the Nazis. Soviet bombers took out the anti-aircraft guns a few days later. Later the partisan detachment under the command of Vasilyev left the area after sabotaging roads and communicating with Anastasiya.

On 2 October the Zinoviev detachment organized a large diversion on the Vyaz'ye-Bakach line in Novosokolniki-Bokach, south of the Dno station. Anastasiya acted as the liaison officer, supplying information on the movement of German troops to Zinoyev after she received information from an anonymous informant. The partisans destroyed two locomotives, tanks, and guns, slowing down equipment shipments. In early November Anastasiya informed Zinoviev about a large quantity of heavily guarded military equipment that was about to be shipped out. A group of five partisans, one of whom was her son Yura, launched a nighttime raid on the station and sabotaged the equipment.

In the winter of 1941 to 1942, German authorities increased security at the train station as well as at military bases and factories, reducing the number of sabotage operations the partisans could safely execute. In January 1942 the Druzhny partisan unit that Anastasiya had maintained contact with informed her that during a battle in Kholm village the 2nd Leningrad Partisan Brigade worked with the 3rd Shock Army to expel German forces. During the operation the detachment commander Zinoviev was killed in action and her son Yura was injured by shelling but taken off the battlefield by another partisan. Zinoviev was awarded the title Hero of the Soviet Union and Yura was awarded the Medal "For Courage".

=== Railroad sabotage operations ===
In December 1941, three partisans who participated in battle as part of the 95th Detachment, returned Dno and put Anastasiya in charge of overseeing the railroad attack. A partisan asked Anastasiya to provide the explosives needed for the mission, which she handed to him concealed in a sack of potatoes. In January the explosives were placed inside the engine of a train used by the German military, causing a huge wreckage. The partisans launched a second attack on a train but were arrested the next day and shot in February. Anastasiya took the deaths of her fellow partisans very personally and felt that their deaths were her fault.

After the group of partisans that attacked the train were shot, attacked on the railway were paused, and all depot employees that the Germans perceived as suspicious were laid off from the depot. Anastasiya convinced the German occupiers to hire an elderly machinist by the name of Filyukhin; Filyukhin gained the trust of the Germans and was given free rein at the station so he could plant explosives given to him by Anastasiya at the depot. On 23 February he planted an explosive at the depot, concealed in a beer bottle inside a boot. On 25 February he exploded a locomotive that had just undergone repairs, destroying military equipment it was carrying. The next week he organized several attacks on German-controlled portions of the railroad, handing out anti-train mines to other machinists, telling them to plant them as far outside the city as they could and then stay off the radar.

== Arrest and death ==
=== First arrest ===
In the summer of 1943, Anastasiya was arrested by the Geheime Feldpolizei. While the police had no evidence against her, an investigator tried to persuade her to work for the German counterintelligence agency. Anastasiya refused to do so, claiming she was busy taking care of her sick parents. The investigator stopped trying to recruit her but left her in the prison for a month before she was released. It turned out that she was released so that surveillance could be done to see who she was in contact with. While Anastasiya was aware she was being watched she met with Filyukhin, told her he was also under surveillance. Two months later Filyukhin was arrested and sent to a concentration camp without being informed of any evidence against him. When Anastasiya went back to her apartment her father told her about recent mass arrests of partisans and scouts who had attempted a rescue operation of prisoners-of-war held by the Germans after one of the agents involved in the operation was captured revealed the names of numerous partisans. The partisans he named were all shot except for one who was sent to the Zapolyansky death camp.

=== Second arrest ===
After Anastasiya realized she would likely be arrested again soon she decided to hand over all the supplies she had accumulated to partisans in Leningrad who were still running sabotage campaigns. Anastasiya helped the remaining partisans in the city left in the middle of the night to nearby rural villages, finding safehouses for them over a period of three days. When she returned to Dno she learned that her son Konstantin had been arrested. Suspecting that her eldest son Yura had been killed and worried about the safety of her younger son, she did not go into hiding but returned to her apartment where she waited for the German police to arrest her. She was arrested almost immediately and the police then released her parents and son Konstantin from their custody. However, her father died not long after his release.

In August 1943, Anastasia was sent to Porkhov, where German agents tried to persuade her to cooperate and name the remaining underground resistance members. Anastasiya was subjected to electric shock, causing her to lose consciousness several times, but she still would not name her contacts. After a while, her captors employed psychological torture by showing her the outside world for brief moments, transporting her to the outskirts of Porkhov to the ruins of an ancient fortress and permitted her to walk along a riverbank; she still refused to make any confessions or name any resistance members.

== Captivity in the Zapolyansky death camp ==
After Anastasiya refused to cooperate with the Germans she was sent to the Zapolyansky death camp, which was in close proximity to Porkhov. In the Zapolyansky camp, where resistance members, partisans, and prisoners of war who refused to cooperate with the German authorities were detained and tortured. In the 10 months of the camp's existence, more than three thousand people were killed. During her captivity, Anastasia tried to help other prisoners and gained their respect.

Anastasiya's son Konstantin learned about the whereabouts of his mother and visited her several times, traveling from Dno and getting permission to speak to her through the fence. He made his last visit on 18 September 1943, after she told him not to come anymore after realizing that she would soon be executed and feared that he would be arrested and executed too. She told him not to stay in the city but live in the forest with the partisans. Konstantin considered trying to save her, but he realized that he and his several comrades didn't have enough resources to do it. Konstantin left the city of Dno with a friend to join the partisans in the forest, and her later became a soldier in the Red Army. After he was demobilized he worked as an engineer in Nizhny Tagil and Novgorod.

On 13 October 1943 Anastasiya was shot on the orders of the camp commandant. In November 1943 the camp was dismantled and all remains of the prisoners killed in the camp's ten months of existence were burned in preparation for the advancing Soviet military. Just three months later the 2nd Baltic and Leningrad fronts of Red Army retook the Dno railroad junction and the surrounding area.

== Recognition ==
On the eve of the 20th anniversary of the defeat of the Germans in the Second World War Anastasiya and nine other partisans in the Pskov region were declared Heroes of the Soviet Union by decree of the Supreme Soviet of the USSR, with eight of the nine people awards being posthumous. A large granite memorial plaque inscribed with "Here, at the station Dno, during the temporary German-Fascist occupation of the city, Hero of the Soviet Union Biseniek Anastasia Alexandrovna participated in the underground resistance. The courageous patriot was brutally tortured and executed by the fascists in October 1943. Eternal glory to the heroes who gave their lives for the freedom and independence of our Motherland" was placed at the train station in Dno where she worked. The depot in Dno contains a small museum dedicated to the history of the town during German occupation and a central street in Dno was named in her honor. In the 1980s historian Nikolai Vassarionovich Masolov compiled her complete biography after speaking with her relatives and surviving members of her partisan detachment.

== See also ==
- List of female Heroes of the Soviet Union
- Soviet partisans
