= Antonina Petrova =

Soviet partisan and medic (1915–1941)

Antonina Vasilievna Petrova
- Антонина Васильевна Петрова
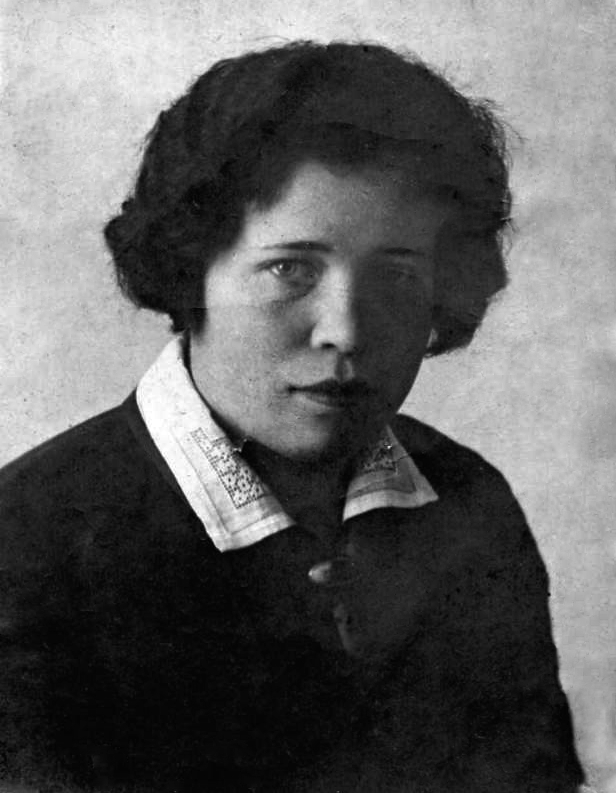
- Born: 14 March 1915; Streshevo, Saint Petersburg Governorate, Russian Empire
- Died: 4 November 1941 (aged 26); Mshinskaya, Leningrad Oblast, Russian SFSR, Soviet Union
- Awards: Hero of the Soviet Union; Order of Lenin

Antonina Petrova (Russian: Антонина Петрова; 14 March 1915 – 4 November 1941) was a Soviet partisan and medic. She was posthumously awarded the title Hero of the Soviet Union on 8 April 1942 for killing herself to avoid being captured and interrogated by the Germans after running out of ammunition.

== Early life ==
Petrova was born on 14 March 1915 in Streshevo, Petrograd to a Russian peasant family. After finishing trade school she worked as a seamstress and later at a hostel. Until German invasion of the Soviet Union in mid 1941, she worked at the Komsomol as an accountant. She was known to her colleagues as a serious person who recorded the minutes of the meetings and rarely said much.

== World War II ==
Immediately after the German invasion she began a nursing course. After completion, she requested a nursing assignment in a battalion. Her battalion often carried out sabotage of roads and attacked Axis army formations from the rear, well within enemy controlled territory. On her first mission they were assigned to pinpoint the location of enemy forces approaching Luga and then attack. Since she was a nurse she had to beg her commander to let her participate in the ambush, during which they hid in roadside bushes, waiting for a German army vehicle to approach. As the vehicle drew near, several members of the regiment attacked while Petrova threw a grenade in front of the car so the riflemen could fire on the occupants. In August, after successful completion of the mission, she was reassigned to the 2nd Partisan Detachment under the command of brothers Ivan and Stanislav Poleyko. This unit consisted of just twenty-seven people. Together with seven other partisan detachments they planted landmines in a field and severed telephone and telegraph lines. From August to the beginning of October the detachment laid mines on the Tolmachevo - Osmino and Luga - Lyady roads, damaged the Tolmachevo-Mshinskaya railroad tracks, and shot down four aircraft. Later in October they destroyed six bridges, including one on the vital Leningrad-Vitebsk railroad. Petrova participated in nearly all of the detachment's military operations and went on several reconnaissance missions. During one mission, after learning of the arrival of an anti-partisan squadron, she informed the rest of her detachment to be prepared, resulting in the survival of all members of the detachment that day.

In late October her detachment was deployed to Mshinskaya station, but the Axis found out about their deployment. Therefore, on November 4, 11 of the partisans that were stationed at their camp were approached by a large detachment of Axis troops. Heavily outnumbered, most of the partisans were killed while fleeing the area, but Petrova picked up a machine gun and began firing on the enemy combatants until she was low on ammunition. After she ran out of ammunition several Axis soldiers rushed at her, but she shot herself to avoid capture. For this act she was posthumously awarded the title Hero of the Soviet Union on 8 April 1942 by decree of the Supreme Soviet. A memorial was constructed where the partisans were killed. Petrova was honored with various memorials as well as a street, young pioneer squad, and a secondary school renamed in her honor.

== See also ==
- List of female Heroes of the Soviet Union
- Natalya Kovshova
- Siege of Leningrad
- Soviet partisans
