= Mariya Kislyak =

Soviet Ukrainian partisan (1925–1943)

- Мария Тимофеевна Кисляк
- Born: 6 March 1925; Lednoye village (present-day Kharkiv, Ukraine)
- Died: 18 June 1943 (aged 17); Kharkov, Reichskommissariat Ukraine
- Cause of death: Execution by hanging
- Awards: Hero of the Soviet Union; Order of Lenin

Mariya Timofeevna Kislyak (Russian: Мария Тимофеевна Кисляк; 6 March 1925 – 18 June 1943) was a Soviet partisan and the leader of a Kharkov underground Komsomol cell. On 8 May 1965 she posthumously awarded the title Hero of the Soviet Union.

== Early life ==
Kislyak was born on 6 March 1925 to a Ukrainian peasant family in the village of Lednoe. After graduating from seven grades of school she studied at a medical school in Kharkiv where she trained to be an assistant to paramedics and midwives. She graduated from training the day before the German invasion of the Soviet Union.

== Partisan activities ==
After the first time the Germans invaded her hometown, Kislyak looked after 43 wounded Red Army soldiers who were left behind in the forest. After collecting food, medicine, and supplies for them she guided them across the front lines, helping them meetup with the rest of her unit. In February 1943 the Red Army expelled German forces from the city, but the Germans retook control after launching a counterattack. During the fighting, a wounded Soviet soldier who she had been taking care of and called himself "Viktor from Voronez" asked her why the city didn't have a strong partisan movement. After Viktor recuperated, Kislyak contacted several partisans hiding out in a nearby forest and asked if she could join their cause. She recruited several acquaintances into the movement and even helped kill an SS officer who had kicked an elderly man in the face, blinding him. After flirting with the SS officer she lured him to a bridge where another partisan was awaiting their arrival with a crowbar. The next day she became a suspect in the officer's disappearance; after being beaten severely and undergoing prolonged interrogation she insisted she knew nothing about his disappearance. While recovering from the torture she composed anti-axis pamphlets on her typewriter.

When she received word that a Gestapo agent nicknamed "the Butcher" would be coming to Kharkiv, she and her partisan unit spent two days planning his capture. Kislyak rented a room right next to his at the farm he was staying at. After courting him for a few days she lured him to a riverbank, where her fellow partisans would be waiting nearby. After shooting a bird with his gun the partisans appeared, a struggle ensued, but he was outnumbered and captured by the partisans. After one put a bag on his head they demanded the names of Nazi collaborators and Gestapo agents before "sentencing" him to death and killing him with a crowbar. That same day more than one hundred villagers, including herself, were collectively arrested by the Gestapo and told they would be killed by a firing squad if the SS man wasn't found alive soon. But the other 97 villagers were let go after the involvement of Kislyak and two other partisans came to light. The three were interrogated and brutally tortured for two weeks straight, as the Gestapo wanted to know who the partisan leader was and didn't believe Kislyak when she said she was the leader; even under torture, she didn't tell the Germans where she stashed the documents the SS man they killed was carrying. Eventually, the trio was hanged in public on 18 June 1943 and their bodies left on display for a day. In 1965 Kislyak was declared a Hero of the Soviet Union.

== See also ==
- List of female Heroes of the Soviet Union
- Soviet partisans
