= Darya Dyachenko =

Soviet Ukrainian partisan (1924–1944)

Darya Grigorievna Dyachenko
- Native name: Дарья Григорьевна Дьяченко
- Born: 2 April 1924; Kumari, Mykolaiv Oblast, Ukrainian SSR, Soviet Union
- Died: 2 April 1944 (aged 20) Tiraspol, Transnistria Governorate
- Allegiance: Soviet Union
- Awards: Hero of the Soviet Union; Order of Lenin

Darya Grigorievna Dyachenko (Russian: Да́рья Григо́рьевна Дьяче́нко; 2 April 1924 – 2 April 1944) was a member of the underground Komsomol guerrilla organization based in Mykolaiv and the head of the partisan group's youth chapter. She was posthumously awarded the title Hero of the Soviet Union on 1 July 1958 by decree of the Supreme Soviet.

== Early life ==
Dyachenko was born on 2 April 1924 to a Ukrainian peasant family in the village of Kumari. She did not complete secondary school while she was living in Lviv. After the German invasion of the Soviet Union in 1941 her father, who had been the chairman of the district committee, was sent to the warfront while Darya and her mother moved to Novo-Andreyevka to live with her grandmother. She was a member of the Komsomol.

== Partisan activities ==
When the Germans occupied her village, Dyachenko joined the resistance movement after meeting with Parfentiy Grechanyy, the leader of the Komosmol organization "Partisan spark". The partisan group was founded in 1941 by the principal of the secondary school in Krymka village. Each cell was composed of five people, and after obtaining typewriters and radios they summarized Sovinformburo broadcasts on paper and spread out the messages via leaflets. They also collected leaflets airdropped by Soviet planes and distributed them among the village.

The partisans collected armaments and trained in the use of grenades and rifles before they began engaging in sabotage. On one mission the cell led by Dyachenko derailed a train carrying German soldiers and their supplies. She was the organizer of a plot to help 200 Soviet prisoners of war escape from a camp. After befriending the group of Romanian prison guards Dyachenko and her comrades invited them to a party and got them drunk before releasing the prisoners of war.

In February 25 partisans from the "partisan spark" detachment were arrested by the Gestapo. On 1 March 1943 Dyachenko was arrested and sent to a prison in Tiraspol. She intended to escape and her friends collected 6,000 German marks to bribe a guard to help her escape, but the plot was discovered and both Dyachenko and the guard were shot on 2 April 1944.

== See also ==
- List of female Heroes of the Soviet Union
- Soviet partisans
