= Fedora Pushina =

Hero of the Soviet Union (1923–1943)

- Федора Андреевна Пушина
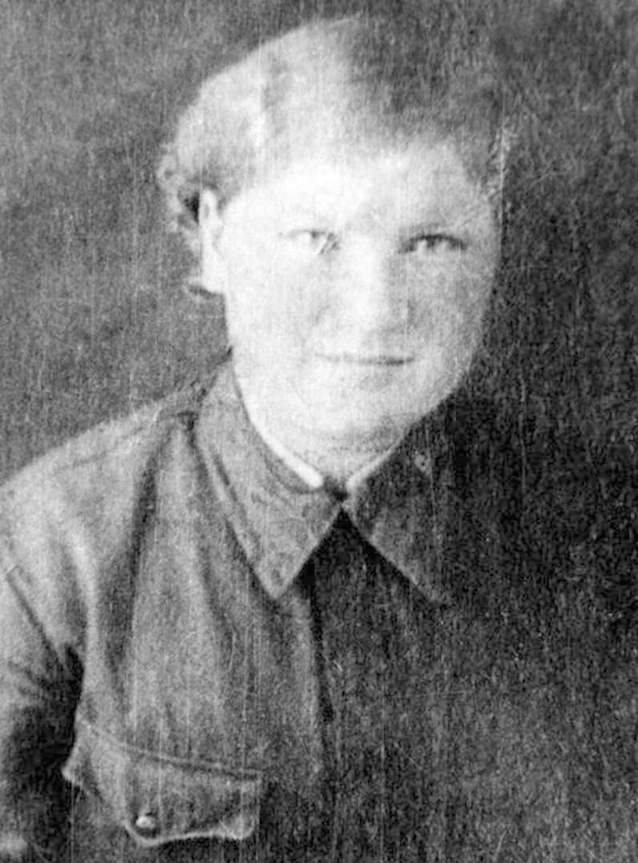
- Born: 13 November 1923; Yakshur-Bodyinsky District, Udmurtia, Soviet Union
- Died: 6 November 1943 (aged 19); Kiev, Ukrainian SSR, Soviet Union
- Military career
- Allegiance: Soviet Union
- Branch: Infantry
- Service years: 1942–1943
- Rank: Lieutenant
- Nickname: Faina
- Unit: 520th Rifle Regiment
- Conflicts: World War II; Eastern Front †
- Awards: Hero of the Soviet Union

Fedora Andreevna Pushina (Russian: Федора Андреевна Пушина; 13 November 1923 – 6 November 1943) was a lieutenant in the 520th Rifle Regiment of the 167th Rifle Division in the 38th Army on the 1st Ukrainian Front during the Second World War. She was posthumously awarded the title Hero of the Soviet Union on 10 January 1944 after she died of wounds from rescuing soldiers in a burning hospital in Kiev on 6 November 1943.

== Civilian life ==
Pushina was born on 13 November 1923 as the ninth child to a Ukrainian peasant family in Turkmachi, Udmurtia within the Soviet Union. Her family moved the district of Izh-Zabegalovsky, where they worked as farmers, which was where Pushina attended school and spent most of her childhood. The village she grew up in did not have a school locally, so she had to attend the Bolshoi-Oshvartsinskaya school in a nearby village, where most of her peers were male. After graduating from school in 1939 she entered paramedic courses in Izhevsk, the capital of the Udmurtia region, despite several members of her family not approving of her career choice. After graduating from medical school she was assigned in January 1942 to work in Feldsher-Obstetric office in Kekoran village, where she took on tasks ranging from pediatrics to obstetrics.

== Military career ==
After the start of the Second World War, Pushina joined the Red Army in April 1942. After undergoing further medical training she was sent to the front lines of the war in August that year assigned to the 20th Rifle Regiment of the 167th Rifle Division in the 38th Army on the 1st Ukrainian Front. On 7 February 1943 she managed to rescue 45 wounded soldiers from the battlefield through mortar attacks and artillery fire in Kursk. On 11 February, she treated the injuries of 57 wounded soldiers at a medical station with no Soviet defensive units nearby. For doing so, the commander of the 520th Rifle Regiment nominated her to be awarded the Medal "For Battle Merit" but his nomination was overruled by the head of the 167th Infantry Division, General Ivan Melnikov, who had her awarded her the Order of the Red Star, a higher-ranking order, instead.

In the Battle of Kiev, Pushina treated the injured in a hospital in Svyatoshino, a suburb of the city. On the morning of 6 November German bombers launched an air raid on the town, with one of the bombs dropped hitting the hospital. Pushina and another member of the unit, Nikolai Kopyotyonkov ran into the burning building to rescue the wounded soldiers from the fire, in which Pushina rescued over 30 soldiers. When the building began to collapse she attempted to run in to save more soldiers but Kopyotyonkov held her back, preventing her from entering. She sustained severe injuries including burns and head trauma, and died in Kopyotyonkov's arms later that day. Kopyotyonkov sustained severe burns as well but returned to the military in 1944 after recovering and remained in the military until 1962. Both Pushina and Kopyotyonkov were awarded the title Hero of the Soviet Union on 10 January 1944.

== Awards and recognition ==
Awards

- Hero of the Soviet Union
- Order of Lenin
- Order of the Red Star

Recognition

- There is a street named after her in Sviatoshyn, Kiev and a medical school bearing her name in Izhevsk.
- Memorials dedicated to her feats are present in Yakshur-Bodja and Izhevsk.

== See also ==
- List of female Heroes of the Soviet Union
- Zinaida Mareseva
- Lyudmila Kravets
