= Nina Sosnina =

Soviet partisan (1923–1943)

- Born: 30 November 1923; Kukhari village, Kiev Governorate, Soviet Union
- Died: 31 August 1943 (aged 19); Malyn, Reichskommissariat Ukraine
- Awards: Hero of the Soviet Union

Nina Ivanovna Sosnina (Russian: Нина Ивановна Соснина, Ukrainian: Ніна Сосніна Іванівна; 30 November 1923 – 31 August 1943) was the leader of an underground Komsomol cell in Malyn during the Second World War. She was posthumously declared a Hero of the Soviet Union on 8 May 1965, over twenty years after her death in the war.

== Civilian life ==
Sosnina was born on 30 November 1923 to a Russian family. Ivan Sosnin, her father, who was born in Siberia, was a doctor who had gone to medical school in Kiev after traveling to Australia, France, and Italy over a span of two years. He married a nurse by the name of Larissa Kondratyuk after graduating medical school and the couple soon moved to Kukhari village to assist in fighting a typhoid epidemic in the village. After Nina's younger brother Valentin was born there in 1926 the couple soon moved to the nearby Teterev village to establish a small hospital. When her father's health worsened he brought the family to his hometown Malyn, where Nina graduated from secondary school in the summer of 1941. She had joined the Komsomol in 1937.

== Partisan activities ==
After Pavel Taraskin, a senior Lieutenant of the Red Army, escaped from the prisoner-of-war camp that he was held in, he was appointed to be the leader of the Malyn underground District Party Committee. Sosnia was made secretary of the District Komsomol Committee. Taraskin ordered five resistance cells to be formed, and only the leader of a cell would be able to directly contact him. Sosnina created one underground resistance cell based in Malyn and helped form cells in other villages in her district.

The Sosnin family home became a headquarters for resistance activities in the area; it was where the partisans delivered the leaflets they produced and where they meticulously created a map of Axis defenses in the area. Eventually the partisans managed to obtain weapons and explosives after convincing Slovak guards of the storage facilities to help the resistance, as many of the guards had been patients of Sosnina'a father. As a doctor, Ivan Sosnin forged health certificates to exempt several resistance members from forced labour.

On 22 January 1943, not long after using the explosives they gathered to destroy a German locomotive, Taraskin was executed by the Germans. After Taraskin's death it was decided that Sosnina would be the new partisan leader, and the units continued their usual leaflet-spreading, re-supply, sabotage, and reconnaissance operations. Sosnina became skilled in the use of a variety of weapons, including grenades and machine guns. Using her contacts with a Ukrainian who was fighting in the Hungarian Army, she managed to ambush Axis punitive detachments that were sent to capture the partisans. Even after the Commissar of the partisan groups offered her a promotion to become the Komosomol organizer in his unit, she declined the offer in order to stay in Malyn, as her unit was planning an upcoming attack on an Axis garrison.

While helping an injured machine gunner by the name of Fedor Zichenko, Sosnina took over his role as gunner to provide cover for his fellow soldiers. After his arm developed gangrene, requiring amputation, in the village of Pirishki, he was sent to the house of a schoolteacher who was sympathetic to the partisans, where Dr. Sosnin would soon arrive to operate; Nina Sosnina accompanied him. However, a truckload of German soldiers encircled the house only an hour later and a standoff ensued, with Sosnina firing a machine gun and throwing grenades out the window. The teacher, knowing she would be executed for sheltering partisans, killed herself immediately. Another Soviet prisoner-of-war who was staying in the house jumped out a window and was captured by the German police Eventually the German soldiers lit the entire house on fire, with the rest of the resistance members still inside. Sosnina's mother and brother, who were not at the teacher's house, were arrested by the Gestapo and sent to a concentration camp, but both managed to escape and lived to see the end of the war.

Sosnina was soon nominated for the title Hero of the Soviet Union but the nomination was initially rejected because several people from her partisan group had family members who were arrested during the Great Purge. She was belatedly awarded the title in 1965 after the rehabilitation of many people arrested during the Great Purge led to the revaluation of her nomination, after which various monuments and memorials were constructed in her honor.

== See also ==
- List of female Heroes of the Soviet Union
- Soviet partisans
