= Yelena Ubiyvovk =

Soviet partisan (1918–1942)

Yelena Konstantinovna Ubiyvovk
- Елена Константиновна Убийвовк
- Born: 22 November 1918; Poltava, Ukrainian State
- Died: 26 May 1942 (aged 23); Poltava, Reichskommissariat Ukraine
- Awards: Hero of the Soviet Union

Yelena Konstantinovna Ubiyvovk (Russian: Елена Константиновна Убийвовк; 22 November 1918 – 26 May 1942) was a partisan and leader of a Komsomol cell during the Second World War. She was posthumously declared a Hero of the Soviet Union on 8 May 1965, over twenty years after her death.

== Civilian life ==
Ubiyvovk was born on 22 November 1918 to a Ukrainian family in Poltava; her father was a doctor. In 1937 she graduated from secondary school with honors. She then enrolled at the astronomy department in the University of Kharkov, which she completed in 1941.

== Partisan activities ==
In November 1941 Ubiyvovk founded a Komsomol underground resistance cell that came to be nicknamed "The Undefeated Poltav Women". Initially the group consisted of only nine members plus herself, but eventually they managed to recruit more people until the group's membership reached twenty people, plus Ubiyvovk and a correspondent for the Krasnaya Zvezda newspaper, Captain Sergey Sapigo. Initially the group began providing food and civilian clothes to Soviet prisoners-of-war held near a hospital where one of them worked, but after receiving two radios from a partisan detachment hiding in the Dikan forest they also began providing information transcribed from the podcasts. In the group's six months of existence they spread 2,000 anti-Axis leaflets, helped 18 Soviet prisoners-of-war escape, stole weapons from German depots, burned down an office holding records and lists of people scheduled to be exiled into forced labor, and helped other cities establish resistance movements. On one occasion the partisans sabotaged equipment at a tank repair facility, causing the tanks repaired there to break down as soon as they were put back into service; they also destroyed a power plant.

Eventually the unit began making plants to enter communication with the Red Army and go on reconnaissance missions, but an operative traveling to send a report to the Red Army detailing their activities and the information they would be able to provide if they could engage in regular communication was captured. The operative was tortured and eventually betrayed the group members, identifying Ubiyvovk and Sapigo as individuals of interest. Soon all members of the resistance were arrested and interrogated over a period of three weeks before they were all shot on 26 May 1942. Ubiyvovk had been tortured and interrogated twenty-six times before her execution and had sent letters requesting poison so she could kill herself if needed. She was posthumously declared a Hero of the Soviet Union on 8 May 1965 by decree of the Supreme Soviet.

== See also ==
- List of female Heroes of the Soviet Union
- Soviet partisans
