= Anna Morozova =

Soviet partisan (1921–1944)

- Анна Морозова
- Born: 23 May 1921; Polyana village, Kaluga Governorate, Russian SFSR
- Died: 31 December 1944 (aged 23); Gmina Siemiątkowo, Poland
- Military career
- Branch: Red Army
- Unit: 10th Army
- Awards: Hero of the Soviet Union; Order of Lenin; Order of the Red Star; Medal "For Courage"; Order of the Cross of Grunwald, 2nd Class

Anna Afanasyevna Morozova (Russian: А́нна Афана́сьевна Моро́зова; 23 May 1921 – 31 December 1944) was a Soviet partisan who later joined the Red Army and became a posthumous recipient of the title Hero of the Soviet Union on 8 May 1965 for her resistance activities.

== Early life ==
Morozova was born on 23 May 1921 to a Russian peasant family in Polyana village, at the time within the Kaluga Governorate. She moved in 1936 to Bryansk when her father got a job as manager of a tailor shop. After graduating from eight grades of secondary school she studied to become an accountant. In 1938 she was hired to work as a telephone operator until her job was no longer needed. In November 1939 she worked at a tailor's shop until she began working for the Soviet Air Force.

== Partisan activities ==
Not long after the German invasion of the Soviet Union in 1941 Morozova's home city of Seshcha was taken over by the German military on 9 August. After the Germans took over the airfield where she worked they ousted the 9th Heavy Bomber Aviation Brigade of the Soviet Air Forces from the field and parked an estimated 300 German bombers of the Luftflotte 2 at their new airbase. The German occupiers used the airbase during their bombings of Moscow and other major cities. The Main Intelligence Directorate of the Soviet Union was in desperate need of information about the state of the strategically important airbase that had been taken over by the Luftwaffe. To gain such intelligence for the Red Army, an underground reconnaissance organization was created by resistance members in Bryansk to infiltrate the airbase. Morozova returned to Seshcha to work undercover at the airbase as a laundress, where she ended up meeting several of her friends from school that were unable to leave the city in time. She invited them to join her partisan group; from Spring 1942 to September 1943 they operated as part of the 1st Kletnyanskaya Partisan Brigade, spying in enemy forces, sabotaging and outright destroying Luftwaffe aircraft, and disabling ground equipment. The brigade eventually became an international resistance organization, spanning the Soviet Union, Poland and Czechoslovakia. When the unit got their hands on magnetic landmines they used them to destroy twenty aircraft, six trains, and two ammunition warehouses. The unit transferred information on the specifications of Tiger tanks, identification papers of German soldiers, and medical technology. The information Morozova provided to the Air Force made sure that Soviet bombers attacked the correct airbase where the Germans were stationed instead of a dummy base constructed by the Germans. Later other partisans used the information she gathered to storm the airbase, killing an estimated 200 German airmen and 30 cars.

In September 1943 Morozova left the partisan movement and joined the Red Army after Soviet forces retook control of Seshcha in the operation to retake Bryansk. She was awarded the Medal "For Courage" and the Order of the Red Star by the 10th Army of the Soviet Union for her activities in the partisan movement. After joining the Red Army and graduating from radio operator's courses in July 1944 she was deployed to Poland as part of the 10th Army in Poland, using the pseudonym "Swan". In late 1944 she was assigned to a Soviet-Polish partisan unit. On 31 December 1944 after she was badly wounded in battle when a bullet shattered her wrist, she detonated a grenade on herself in order to avoid capture, ending her life and killing two SS soldiers.

== Recognition ==
Morozova's image was featured on a 1966 postage stamp of the Soviet Union and a postal cover of the Russian Federation. Multiple streets in Bryansk bear her name and she was posthumously declared a Hero of the Soviet Union in 1965.

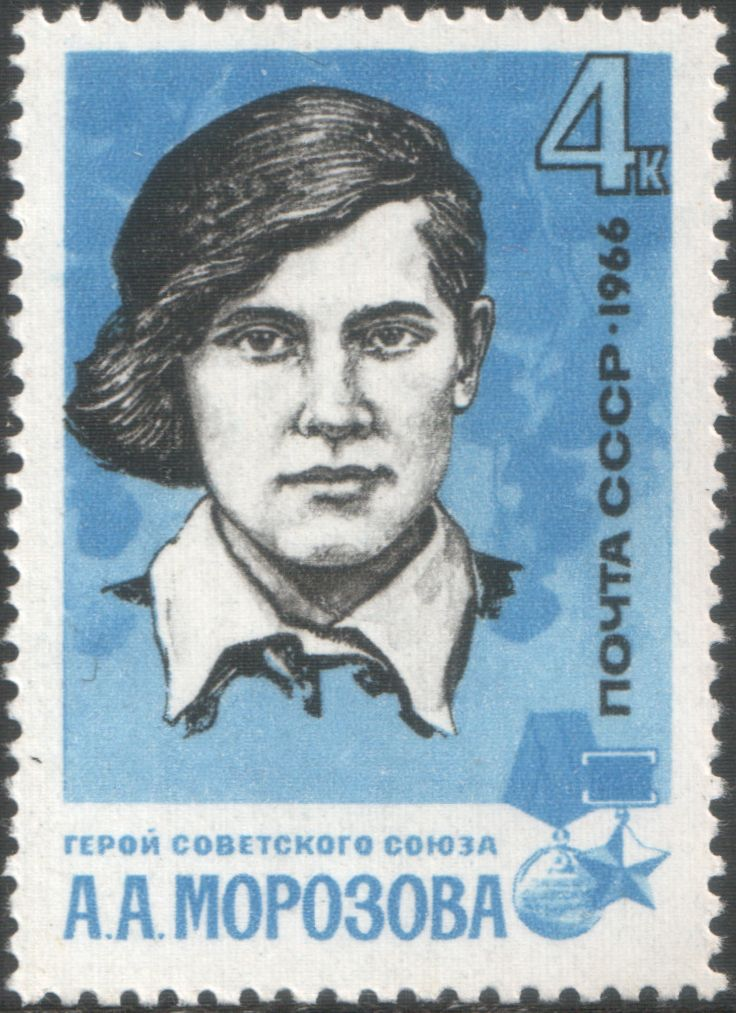
1966 postage stamp honoring Morozova

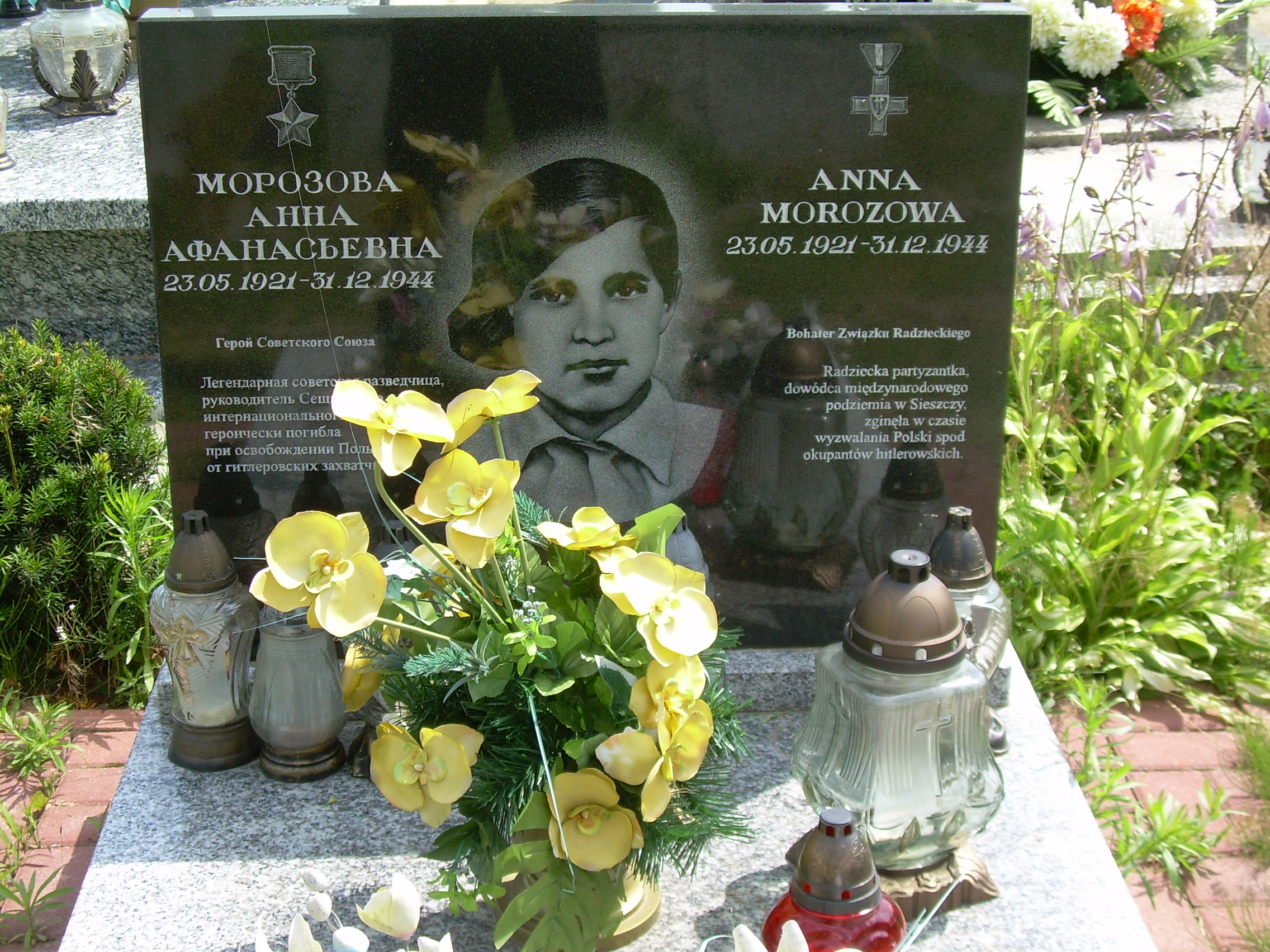
Morozova's grave in Poland

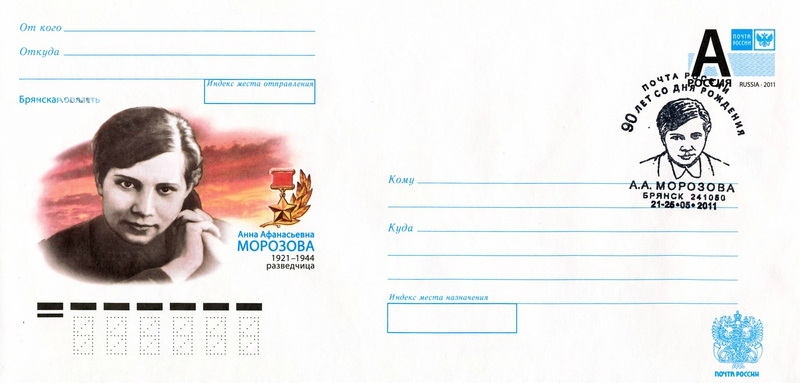
2011 envelope of Russia featuring Morozova

== See also ==
- List of female Heroes of the Soviet Union
- Soviet partisans
- Natalya Kovshova
