= List of female Heroes of the Soviet Union =

This is a list of female Heroes of the Soviet Union; of the 12,777 people awarded the title, 95 were women, 49 of whom were posthumous recipients of the title.

== Recipients ==
This colour, along with the * (asterisk), indicates that the title was awarded posthumously.

=== Soviet military personnel ===
Name	Unit	Rank	Date of award	Notes	References
Valentina Grizodubova; Валентина Гризодубова	Flight "Rodina"	Colonel	2 November 1938	Pilot-in-Command	
Polina Osipenko; Полина Осипенко	Flight "Rodina"	Major	2 November 1938	Co-pilot	
Marina Raskova; Марина Раскова	Flight "Rodina"	Major	2 November 1938	Navigator	
Yekaterina Zelenko; Екатерина Зеленко	135th Light Bomber Regiment	Senior Lieutenant	5 May 1990 *	Killed in action in unclear circumstances on 12 September 1941.	
Raisa Aronova; Раиса Аронова	46th Guards Night Bomber Regiment	Major	15 May 1946	—	
Vera Belik; Вера Белик	46th Guards Night Bomber Regiment	Lieutenant	23 February 1945 *	Killed in action on 25 August 1944 after shot down by German fighter.	
Tatyana Makarova; Татьяна Макарова	46th Guards Night Bomber Regiment	Lieutenant	23 February 1945 *	Killed in action on 25 August 1944 after shot down by German fighter.	
Marina Chechneva; Марина Чечнева	46th Guards Night Bomber Regiment	Major	15 August 1946	—	
Rufina Gasheva; Руфина Гашева	46th Guards Night Bomber Regiment	Major	23 February 1945	—	
Olga Sanfirova; Ольга Санфирова	46th Guards Night Bomber Regiment	Captain	23 February 1945 *	Killed in action on 13 December 1944 after stepping on landmine when evacuating downed aircraft.	
Polina Gelman; Полина Гельман	46th Guards Night Bomber Regiment	Major	15 May 1946	—	
Antonina Khudyakova; Антонина Худякова	46th Guards Night Bomber Regiment	Senior Lieutenant	15 May 1946	—	
Larisa Litvinova; Лариса Литвинова	46th Guards Night Bomber Regiment	Captain	23 February 1948	—	
Natalya Meklin; Наталья Меклин	46th Guards Night Bomber Regiment	Major	23 February 1945	—	
Yevdokiya Nikulina; Евдокия Никулина	46th Guards Night Bomber Regiment	Major	26 October 1944	—	
Yevdokiya Nosal; Евдокия Носаль	46th Guards Night Bomber Regiment	Junior Lieutenant	24 May 1943 *	Killed in action on 23 April 1943 when hit in the head by a piece of shrapnel from anti-aircraft fire.	
Zoya Parfyonova; Зоя Парфёнова	46th Guards Night Bomber Regiment	Senior Lieutenant	18 August 1945	—	
Yevdokiya Pasko; Евдокия Пасько	46th Guards Night Bomber Regiment	Senior Lieutenant	26 October 1944	—	
Nadezhda Popova; Надежда Попова	46th Guards Night Bomber Regiment	Captain	23 February 1945	—	
Nina Raspopova; Нина Распопова	46th Guards Night Bomber Regiment	Senior Lieutenant	15 May 1946	—	
Yevgeniya Rudneva; Евгения Руднева	46th Guards Night Bomber Regiment	Senior Lieutenant	26 October 1944 *	Killed in action on 9 April 1944 after plane was shot down from anti-aircraft warfare.	
Yekaterina Ryabova; Екатерина Рябова	46th Guards Night Bomber Regiment	Senior Lieutenant	23 February 1945	—	
Irina Sebrova; Ирина Себрова	46th Guards Night Bomber Regiment	Senior Lieutenant	23 February 1945	—	
Mariya Smirnova; Мария Смирнова	46th Guards Night Bomber Regiment	Major	26 October 1944	—	
Maguba Syrtlanova; Магуба Сыртланова	46th Guards Night Bomber Regiment	Senior Lieutenant	15 May 1946	—	
Nina Ulyanenko; Нина Ульяненко	46th Guards Night Bomber Regiment	Lieutenant	18 August 1945	—	
Yevgeniya Zhigulenko; Евгения Жигуленко	46th Guards Night Bomber Regiment	Major	23 February 1945	—	
Mariya Dolina; Мария Долина	125th Guards Dive Bomber Regiment	Major	18 August 1945	—	
Galina Dzhunkovskaya; Галина Джунковская	125th Guards Dive Bomber Regiment	Major	18 August 1945	—	
Nadezhda Fedutenko; Надежда Федутенко	125th Guards Dive Bomber Regiment	Major	18 August 1945	—	
Klavdia Fomicheva; Клавдия Фомичёва	125th Guards Dive Bomber Regiment	Lieutenant Colonel	18 August 1945	—	
Antonina Zubkova; Антонина Зубкова	125th Guards Dive Bomber Regiment	Captain	18 August 1945	—	
Lydia Litvyak; Лидия Литвяк	73rd Guards Fighter Regiment	Senior Lieutenant	5 May 1990 *	Presumably killed in action on 1 August 1943 after crash; some think she may have survived and been a POW.	
Tamara Konstantinova; Тамара Константинова	566th Attack Aviation Regiment	Senior Lieutenant	29 June 1945	—	
Anna Yegorova; Анна Егорова	805th Ground Attack Air Regiment	Senior Lieutenant	6 May 1965	—	
Tatyana Baramzina; Татьяна Барамзина	252nd Rifle Regiment	Corporal	24 March 1945 *	Captured, tortured, and executed with an anti-tank rifle on 5 July 1944 after running out of ammunition while trying to protect trenches of wounded soldiers.	
Yelena Stempkovskaya; Елена Стемпковская	216th Rifle Regiment	Junior Sergeant	15 May 1946 *	Killed in action on 26 June 1942. Some accounts state that she was captured and tortured while others say she was killed in battle.	
Manshuk Mametova; Маншук Маметова	21st Guards Rifle Division	Senior Sergeant	1 March 1944 *	Killed in action defending strategic bridgehead on 15 October 1943.	
Nina Onilova; Нина Онилова	54th Rifle Regiment	Senior Sergeant	14 May 1965 *	Died of wounds on 8 March 1942	
Mariya Batrakova; Мария Батракова	463rd Rifle Regiment	Junior Lieutenant	19 March 1944	—	
Anna Nikandrova; Анна Никандрова	426th Rifle Regiment	Senior Lieutenant	24 March 1945 *	Killed in action while trying to take out machine-gun bunker on 23 June 1944.	
Tatyana Kostyrina; Татьяна Костырина	691st Rifle Regiment	Junior Sergeant	16 May 1944 *	Killed in action on 22 November 1942.	
Natalya Kovshova; Наталья Ковшова	528th Rifle Regiment	Private	14 February 1943 *	Killed in action after detonating grenades when fully surrounded by German troops on 14 August 1942.	
Mariya Polivanova; Мария Поливанова	528th Rifle Regiment	Private	14 February 1943 *	Killed in action after detonating grenades when fully surrounded by German troops on 14 August 1942.	
Aliya Moldagulova; Алия Молдагулова	54th Independent Rifle Brigade	Corporal	4 June 1944 *	Died of wounds on 14 January 1944 after shot in hand-to-hand combat	
Lyudmila Pavlichenko; Людмила Павличенко	25th Rifle Division	Major	25 October 1943	—	
Irina Levchenko; Ирина Левченко	41st Tank Brigade	Lieutenant Colonel	6 May 1965	—	
Mariya Oktyabrskaya; Мария Октябрьская	26th Guards Tank Brigade	Senior Sergeant	2 August 1944 *	Died of wounds after remaining in coma for two months after head injury on 15 March 1944.	
Mariya Bayda; Мария Байда	514th Rifle Regiment	Senior Sergeant	20 June 1942	—	
Mariya Borovichenko; Мария Боровиченко	32nd Guards Artillery Regiment	Sergeant	6 May 1965 *	Killed in action on 4 July 1943 after using body as human shield to protect colleague.	
Valeriya Gnarovskaya; Валерия Гнаровская	907th Rifle Regiment	Senior Medical NCO	3 June 1944 *	Killed in action on 23 September 1943 after throwing self under tank with bag of grenades to protect hospital tent.	
Vera Kashcheyeva; Вера Кащеева	120th Rifle Regiment	Senior Lieutenant	28 February 1944	—	
Kseniya Konstantinova; Ксения Константинова	730th Rifle Regiment	Senior Medical NCO	4 June 1944 *	Captured, tortured and executed on 1 October 1943 after running out of ammunition while trying to protect injured soldiers.	
Lyudmila Kravets; Людмила Кравец	63rd Guards Rifle Regiment	Senior Sergeant	31 May 1945	—	
Zinaida Mareseva; Зинаида Маресева	214th Guards Rifle Regiment	Senior Sergeant	22 February 1944 *	Died of wounds on 6 August 1943 after using body as human shield to defend wounded soldiers from mortar attack.	
Fedora Pushina; Федора Пушина	520th Rifle Regiment	Lieutenant	10 January 1944 *	Died of wounds on 6 November 1943 shortly after rescuing numerous soldiers from burning hospital.	
Zinaida Samsonova; Зинаида Самсонова	667th Rifle Regiment	Senior Sergeant	3 June 1944 *	Killed in action on 27 January 1944 after shot by German sniper while attempting to rescue wounded soldier.	
Mariya Shcherbachenko; Мария Щербаченко	835th Rifle Regiment	Senior NCO	23 October 1943	—	
Mariya Shkarletova; Мария Шкарлетова	170th Guards Rifle Regiment	Senior NCO	24 March 1945	—	
Zinaida Tusnolobova-Marchenko; Зинаида Туснолобова-Марченко	849th Rifle Regiment	Senior Medical NCO	6 December 1957	—	
Yekaterina Mikhailova-Demina; Екатерина Михайлова-Дёмина	369th Independent Naval Infantry Battalion	Chief Petty Officer	5 May 1990	—	
Galina Petrova; Галина Петрова	386th Independent Naval Infantry Battalion	Chief Petty Officer	17 November 1943	Killed in action less than a month later on 4 December 1943.	
Mariya Tsukanova; Мария Цуканова	355th Independent Guards Naval Infantry Battalion	Corporal	14 September 1945 *	Killed in action on 14 August 1945.	
Nina Gnilitskaya; Нина Гнилицкая	383rd Rifle Division	Private	31 March 1943 *	Killed in action on 10 December 1941.	

=== Soviet partisans ===
Name	Date of award	Notes	References
Yelizaveta Chaikina; Елизавета Чайкина	6 March 1942 *	Captured and executed on 22 November 1941	
Yelena Kolesova; Елена Колесова	21 November 1944 *	Killed in action on 11 September 1942	
Zoya Kosmodemyanskaya; Зоя Космодемьянская	16 February 1942 *	Captured and executed on 29 November 1941	
Tatyana Marinenko; Татьяна Мариненко	8 May 1965 *	Captured and executed on 2 February 1942	
Anna Maslovskaya; Анна Масловская	15 May 1944	—	
Marytė Melnikaitė; Мария Мельникайте	22 March 1944 *	Captured and executed on 13 July 1943	
Antonina Petrova; Антонина Петрова	8 April 1942 *	Killed herself to avoid capture on 4 November 1941	
Larisa Ratushnaya; Лариса Ратушная	8 May 1965 *	Murdered by a traitor in her unit on 18 March 1944	
Valentina Safronova; Валентина Сафронова	8 May 1965 *	Tortured to death by the Gestapo on 1 May 1943	
Helene Kullmann; Леэн Кульман	8 May 1965 *	Captured and executed on 6 March 1943	
Anna Lisitsyna; Анна Лисицына	25 September 1943 *	Killed in action on 3 August 1942	
Mariya Melentyeva; Мария Мелентьева	25 September 1943 *	Captured and executed in 1943	
Anna Morozova; Анна Морозова	8 May 1965 *	Killed in action in December 1944	
Anastasiya Biseniek; Анастасия Бисениек	9 May 1965 *	Captured and executed in October 1943	
Darya Dyachenko; Дарья Дьяченко	1 July 1958 *	Captured and executed on 2 April 1944	
Ulyana Gromova; Ульяна Громова	21 September 1943 *	Captured and executed on 16 January 1943	
Lyubov Shevtsova; Любовь Шевцова	21 September 1943 *	Captured and executed on 9 February 1943	
Vera Kharuzhaya; Вера Хоружая	17 May 1960 *	Captured and executed on 4 December 1942	
Mariya Kislyak; Мария Кисляк	8 May 1965 *	Captured and executed on 18 June 1943	
Yelena Mazanik; Елена Мазаник	29 October 1943	—	
Mariya Osipova; Мария Осипова	29 October 1943	—	
Nadezhda Troyan; Надежда Троян	29 October 1943	—	
Klavdiya Nazarova; Клавдия Назарова	20 August 1945 *	Captured and executed on 12 December 1942	
Zinaida Portnova; Зинаида Портнова	1 July 1958 *	Captured and executed in January 1944	
Nina Sosnina; Нина Соснина	8 May 1965 *	Killed in action on 31 August 1943	
Yelena Ubiyvovk; Елена Убийвовк	8 May 1965 *	Captured and executed on 26 May 1942	
Nadezhda Volkova; Надежда Волкова	8 May 1965 *	Killed in action on 26 November 1942	
Yefrosinya Zenkova; Ефросинья Зенькова	1 July 1958	—	

=== Soviet cosmonauts ===
Name	Mission	Date of award	Notes	References
Valentina Tereshkova; Валентина Терешкова	Vostok 6	22 June 1963	First woman in space	
Svetlana Savitskaya; Светлана Савицкая	Soyuz T-7 and Soyuz T-12	27 August 1982, 29 July 1984 (twice)	First woman to make a spacewalk	

=== Foreign military personnel ===
Name	Country	Unit	Rank	Date of award	Notes	References
Aniela Krzywoń	Poland	"Emilia Plater" Independent Women's Battalion	Private	11 November 1943 *	Killed in action on 12 October 1943	
