= Larisa Ratushnaya =

Soviet Ukrainian partisan (1921–1944)

Larisa Stepanovna Ratushnaya
- Лариса Степановна Ратушная
- Born: 9 January 1921; Tyvriv, Vinnytsia Province, Podolia Governorate
- Died: 18 March 1944 (aged 23); Vinnytsia, Ukrainian SSR
- Awards: Hero of the Soviet Union; Order of Lenin

Larisa Ratushnaya (Russian: Лариса Ратушная; 9 January 1921 – 18 March 1944) was a Soviet partisan and underground resistance fighter. She was posthumously awarded the title Hero of the Soviet Union on 8 May 1965 twenty years after the end of the war.

== Early life ==
Ratushnaya was born on 9 January 1921 to a Ukrainian peasant family in the village of Tyvriv, located in Ukraine. She became a member of the Komosmol in 1937 shortly before graduating from secondary school in 1938. In 1939 she entered Moscow State University but had to postpone her studies after the German invasion of the Soviet Union.

== World War II ==
After leaving her studies at Moscow State University she entered nursing courses so she could enlist in the local militia after completing training. As a medical orderly in the 8th Krasnopresnenskaya Division she participated in the Battle of Moscow. In October 1941 she was captured and taken prisoner by enemy forces in Naro-Fominsk but later managed to escape to Vinnytsia. In January 1942 she joined the partisan unit Vinnytsia underground under the command of Ivan Bevz. Ratushnaya was noted for her talent to forge German documents and seals, saving many peoples lives by providing identifications for former POWs as well as forms exempting people from deportation to Germany, further enabling the partisan unit's activities. Due to her fluency in German she managed to infiltrate a POW camp and help several prisoners escape.

Ratushnaya was again arrested by the Gestapo in July 1942 while she was working at a candle factory and sent her to the concentration camp in Hnivan, which she escaped from in April 1943. After her second escape she returned to partisan activities, working in a makeshift printing outlet printing anti-Axis pamphlets and delivered various supplies including weapons, ammunition, and medicine to other partisan detachments. On 18 March 1944 she was killed by an Axis infiltrator of her unit who had knocked on her door and asked to speak to her before shooting her twice. She was buried with full military honors in the Park of Glory in Vinnytsia where there is now an eternal flame memorial. Over twenty years after her death she was posthumously awarded the title Hero of the Soviet Union by decree of the Supreme Soviet for her resistance activities.

== See also ==
- List of female Heroes of the Soviet Union
- Soviet partisans
