= Antonina Khudyakova =

Soviet aviator

Antonina Fyodorovna Khudyakova
- Антонина Фёдоровна Худякова
- Born: 20 June [O.S. 7 June] 1917; Novaya Sloboda, Oryol Governorate, Russian Empire (present day Sloboda, Karachevsky District, Bryansk Oblast, Russian Federation)
- Died: 17 December 1998 (aged 81); Oleksandriia, Kirovohrad Oblast, Ukraine
- Military career
- Allegiance: Soviet Union
- Branch: Soviet Air Force
- Service years: 1941–1945
- Rank: Senior Lieutenant
- Unit: 46th Taman Guards Night Bomber Aviation Regiment
- Conflicts: World War II; Eastern Front
- Awards: Hero of the Soviet Union

Antonina Fyodorovna Khudyakova (Russian: Антонина Фёдоровна Худякова; 20 June [O.S. 7 June] 1917 – 17 December 1998) was a senior lieutenant and deputy squadron commander in the 46th Taman Guards Night Bomber Aviation Regiment, nicknamed the "Night Witches" during World War II. For successfully completing 926 sorties she was declared a Hero of the Soviet Union on 15 May 1946.

== Early life ==
Khudyakova was born on 20 June [O.S. 7 June] 1917 in the town of Novaya Sloboda in the Oryol Governorate to a Russian peasant family. After completing her seventh year of school in 1932 she went on to attend the Ordzhonikidzegrad Engineering College in Bryansk until becoming a welding technician in 1937. She began working in Dniprodzerzhynsk, where she was eventually promoted to teach welding at the rail car factory in October 1938. After graduating from the local Dneprodzerzhinsky aeroclub in December 1939 she was sent to the Kherson School of flight instructors, graduating in May 1940 before becoming a flight instructor at an aeroclub in Bryansk. Not long thereafter she relocated the Oryol aviation club, where she remained a flight instructor until the school had to be evacuated to Inzhavino due to the war. She continued to train cadets from the aeroclub until joining the military in December 1941.

== Military career ==
Upon enlisting in the military at the end of 1941 Khudyakova was sent to undergo training Engels Military Aviation School with the rest of the volunteers for the three women's aviation regiments founded by Marina Raskova. In May 1942 she was deployed to the Eastern front as a pilot with the rank of sergeant in the 588th Night Bomber Regiment, which was renamed in February 1943 to the 46th Guards Night Bomber Aviation Regiment. By December 1942 she was made a flight commander, and soon thereafter she was promoted to junior lieutenant in February 1943. In May 1943 she was made a deputy squadron commander, and by October that year she tallied 450 sorties, sometimes flying six in one night. Seeing combat on the Southern, Transcaucasus, North Caucasus, 4th Ukrainian, and 2nd Belarusian fronts, she participated in the bombing axis forces based throughout Eastern Europe including the Caucasus, Kuban, Krasnodar, Crimea, Ukraine, Belorussia, Poland, and Germany. Shortly before the surrender of Nazi Germany on 28 April 1945 she was injured during what was her last sortie in the conflict. After the end of the war she was nominated for the title Hero of the Soviet Union on 17 June 1945 for completing 926 sorties, which was awarded nearly a year later on 15 May 1946. She remained a deputy squadron commander in her regiment until it was disbanded in October 1945, after which she served in other regiments including the 701st Night Bomber Regiment, which also flew the Po-2. Later in March 1946 she transferred to the 374th Transport Regiment, where she piloted the Li-2. From September 1946 to June 1947 she served in the 930th Transport Regiment, after which she left active duty for the reserve with the rank of senior lieutenant.

== Civilian life ==
After retiring from active duty, Khudyakova served as chairman of the Teykovsky District DOSAV Committee from April 1949 to October 1951; she was admitted to the Communist Party in 1952. In 1957 she moved to the city of Oleksandriia in the Kirovohrad Oblast of the Ukrainian SSR and lived there until her death in 1998.

== Awards ==
- Hero of the Soviet Union (15 May 1946)
- Order of Lenin (15 May 1946)
- Two Order of the Red Banner (19 October 1942 and 5 November 1944)
- Three Order of the Patriotic War 1st class (25 October 1943, 22 May 1945, and 11 March 1985)
- campaign and jubilee medals

== See also ==
- List of female Heroes of the Soviet Union
- "Night Witches"
- Polikarpov Po-2
