= Anna Maslovskaya =

Soviet Belarusian partisan (1920–1980)

Anna Ivanovna Maslovskaya
- Native name: Анна Ивановна Масловская
- Born: 6 January 1920 Kursevichi, Poland
- Died: 11 November 1980 (aged 60) Moscow, Soviet Union
- Allegiance: Soviet Union
- Conflicts: World War II
- Awards: Hero of the Soviet Union; Order of Lenin; Medal "To a Partisan of the Patriotic War", 1st class

Anna Ivanovna Maslovskaya (Russian: А́нна Ива́новна Масло́вская; 6 January 1920 – 11 November 1980) was a Soviet partisan in the Byelorussian SSR during German occupation in the Second World War. She was awarded the title Hero of the Soviet Union on 15 August 1945 by decree of the Supreme Soviet for her resistance activities.

== Early life ==
Maslovskaya was born on 6 January 1920 to a peasant family in Kursevichi, then in Polish territory, now located in Pastavy District, Vitebsk Region, Belarus. After completing six grades of school she joined the Komsomol and worked in a village secondary school in Lyntupa, Vitebsk region until the German invasion of the Soviet Union.

== World War II ==
Maslovskaya voluntarily joined the Red Army in 1941 as a member of the Red Cross and was assigned to the 71st tank battalion. After her unit was surrounded by enemy forces in Vitebsk she was assigned to travel behind enemy lines in Pastavy. From 24 December 1942 to 4 July 1944 she was a member of the Komsomol Provincial District Committee, after which she worked at a factory that made SS uniforms, where she engaged in occasional sabotage before organizing an armed attack of partisans that killed 90 German soldiers including 23 members of the SS and a general. Many of the partisans that took part were defectors from the German-established "Russian Liberation Army" that conscripted in occupied territories, and after the factory attack they fought in attacks on garrisons in Shemetovo, Svyattyans, Postavy and Svit. After multiple successful attacks 230 personnel from different Red Army battalions with the Guards designation were transferred to partisan units. From then on until 1944 she was put in charge of the Voroshilov Komsomol partisan detachment as an assistant commissar; in the course of her duties she killed dozens of Axis soldiers, destroyed three trains and 240 railroad tracks, carried 23 wounded partisans off the battlefield, and participated in raids on enemy military installations in Zalesye, Kamai, Lintupah, and Myadel. During a raid on one garrison she threw a grenade into a bunker before opening fire on barracks; 50 German soldiers were killed in that operation. For her partisan activities she was awarded the title Hero of the Soviet Union after the war on 15 August 1945.

== Later life ==
After the end of the war Maslovskaya adopted 15 young children orphaned by the war. After joining the Communist party in 1949 she graduated from the Belarus Higher Party School in 1961 and later moved to Moscow where she worked as a tour guide in addition to being a member of the Soviet war veterans committee. She died on 11 November 1980 at the age of 60 and was buried in the Vagankovo Cemetery.

== See also ==
- List of female Heroes of the Soviet Union
- Soviet partisans
