= Nadezhda Volkova =

Soviet Ukrainian partisan (1920–1942)

- Надежда Волкова
- Born: 20 June 1920; Kharkiv, Soviet Ukraine
- Died: 26 November 1942 (aged 22); Vovchansk, Reichskommissariat Ukraine
- Awards: Hero of the Soviet Union

Nadezhda Terentyevna Volkova (Russian: Надежда Терентьевна Волкова; 20 June 1920 – 26 November 1942) was a courier in an underground Komsomol cell during the Second World War. She was posthumously declared a Hero of the Soviet Union on 8 May 1965, over twenty years after death in the war.

== Civilian life ==
Volkova was born on 24 June 1920 in Kharkiv to a white-collar family; her father was Russian and her mother Jewish. In 1936 her family moved to Konotop in Sumy, where she graduated from secondary school. After Germany invaded the Soviet Union in 1941 Nadezhda was evacuated to Insary village in the Mordovian Autonomous Soviet Socialist Republic. There she enrolled in nursing courses and began working in a nearby hospital until March 1942.

== Partisan activities ==
Volkova left her job at the hospital in March to attend training at the Central School of Partisan Organizers in Moscow. After graduating from the school in the fall she was assigned to the Volchansk Forest Partisan Detachment, based in the Kharkov Oblast of Ukraine. She was appointed to work as the liaison officer for Aleksandr Shcherbak, the secretary of the detachment and regional Komsomol Committee. When the group parachuted into the forest of Starosaltovskiy, Shcherbak landed in a tree and broke his legs when he jumped out of the tree. He was given crutches but struggled to walk for the rest of his life. A Gestapo unit was headquartered in the district, resulting in a large police presence that made carrying out operations very difficult for the partisans. As the liaison officer Volkova was tasked with going on reconnaissance missions to gather information about enemy activities and transfer information across partisan units. She was also effective in recruiting new members to join the resistance, having spread leaflets across several villages and spoken to young people interested in joining the unit. While the Komsomol committee was intended primarily to develop resistance efforts and organize partisan detachments, committee members participated in sabotage and espionage against the Axis with the rest of the partisans; Volkova herself participated in many joint missions.

When German authorities learned of the location of the underground partisan organization they surrounded a group of seventeen partisans with over one hundred Axis troops. Volkova refused to leave Shcherbak behind, and as he could not run on crutches they hid in a dugout while Volkova fired on the enemy with a submachine gun, buying time for most of the partisans to escape. When she was running low in ammunition she turned the gun on herself to avoid capture; Shcherbak also died in that battle and they were both buried in Vovchansk. On 8 May 1965 both she and Shcherbak were declared Heroes of the Soviet Union by decree of the Supreme Soviet.

== See also ==
- List of female Heroes of the Soviet Union
- Soviet partisans
