= Zinaida Portnova =

Soviet partisan (1926–1944)

- Зинаида Портнова; Зінаіда Партнова
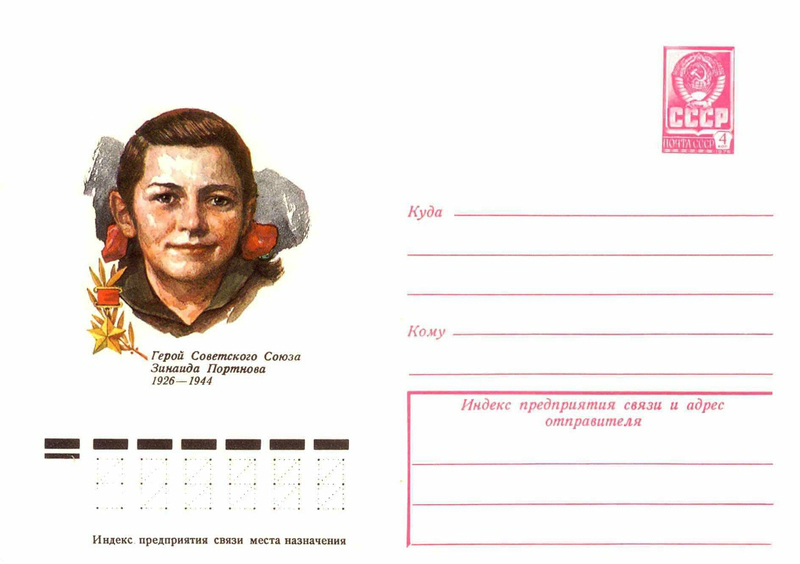
- Portnova on a 1978 Soviet stamp
- Born: 20 February 1926; Leningrad, Russian SFSR, Soviet Union
- Died: 15 January 1944 (aged 17); Polotsk, Byelorussian SSR, Soviet Union
- Organization: Young Pioneer Organization of the Soviet Union
- Awards: Hero of the Soviet Union; Order of Lenin

Zinaida Martynovna Portnova (Russian: Зинаида Мартыновна Портнова, Belarusian: Зінаіда Мартынаўна Партнова; 20 February 1926 – 15 January 1944) was a Soviet partisan and posthumous Hero of the Soviet Union. She is known for sabotaging and poisoning German troops during World War II before being captured, tortured, and then killed at the age of 17.

== Biography ==
Portnova was born in Leningrad on 20 February 1926. She was the daughter of a working-class Belarusian family. Her father worked at the Kirov Plant. She was a seventh-grade student at the 385th school in Leningrad in 1941, when she left for her grandmother's house in the Vitebsk region. Not long afterwards, Nazi Germany invaded the Soviet Union. An incident with the invading Nazi troops, who hit her grandmother while they were confiscating the cattle, led her to hate the Germans.

In 1942, Portnova joined the Belarusian resistance movement, becoming a member of the local underground Komsomol organization in Obol, Vitebsk Region, named Young Avengers. She began by distributing Soviet propaganda leaflets in German-occupied Belarus, collecting and hiding weapons for Soviet soldiers, and reporting on German troop movements. After learning how to use weapons and explosives from the older members of the group, Portnova participated in sabotage actions at a pump, local power plant, and brick factory. These acts are estimated to have killed upwards of 100 German soldiers.

In 1943, Portnova became employed as a kitchen aide in Obol. In August, she poisoned the food meant for the Nazi garrison stationed there. Immediately falling suspect, she said she was innocent and ate some of the food in front of the Nazis to prove it was not poisoned; after she did not fall ill immediately, they released her. Portnova became sick afterwards, vomiting heavily but eventually recovering from the poison after drinking a large quantity of whey. After she did not return to work, the Germans realized she had been the culprit and started searching for her. To avoid the Germans, she became a scout of the partisan unit named after Kliment Voroshilov. In a letter sent to her parents back in besieged Leningrad that month, she wrote that she is "in a partisan detachment. Together with you, we beat the Nazi occupiers". (Note: Original: "Мама, мы сейчас находимся в партизанском отряде. Вместе с вами бьём немецко-фашистских оккупантов...") In October 1943, Portnova joined the VLKSM.

In December 1943 or January 1944, Portnova was sent back to Obol to infiltrate the garrison, discover the reason for the recent Young Avengers failures, then locate and contact the remaining members. She was quickly captured. Reports of her escape vary. One is that, during Gestapo interrogation in the village of Goriany, she took the investigator's pistol off the table, then shot and killed him. When two German soldiers entered after hearing the gunshots, she shot them as well. She then attempted to escape the compound and ran into the woods, where she was caught near the banks of a river.

Another version is that the Gestapo interrogator, in a fit of rage, threw his pistol to the table after threatening to shoot her. Taking the pistol, Portnova shot him. Escaping through the door, she shot a guard in the corridor, then another in the courtyard. After the pistol misfired when Portnova attempted to shoot a guard blocking her access to the street, she was captured.

After being recaptured, Portnova was tortured, possibly for information. She was later driven into the forest and executed or killed during torture on 15 January 1944.

== Legacy ==
On 1 July 1958, Portnova was posthumously declared a Hero of the Soviet Union by the Presidium of the Supreme Soviet. She also received the Order of Lenin. In 1969, the village of Zuya dedicated a commemorative plaque in her honour. She also had numerous Young Pioneer groups named in her honour.

Portnova has had many school teams and groups named after her, namely a school in St. Petersburg. She also had a museum to the Komsomol, situated on the highway between Polotsk and Vitebsk. On top of this, she has two monuments named after her, a bust in Minsk and an obelisk in the village of Obol.

== See also ==
- List of female Heroes of the Soviet Union
