= Zinaida Mareseva =

Soviet soldier (1923–1943)

Zinaida Ivanova Mareseva
- Зинаида Ивановна Маресева
- Born: 20 June 1923; Saratov Governorate, Soviet Union
- Died: 6 August 1943 (aged 20); Belgorod Oblast, Russian SFSR, Soviet Union
- Military career
- Allegiance: Soviet Union
- Branch: Infantry
- Service years: 1942–1943
- Rank: Senior Sergeant
- Units: 214th Guards Rifle Regiment, 73rd Guards Rifle Division
- Conflicts: World War II; Eastern Front †
- Awards: Hero of the Soviet Union; Order of Lenin; Order of the Red Star; Medal "For Battle Merit"

Zinaida Ivanovna Mareseva (Russian: Зинаида Ивановна Маресева; 20 June 1923 – 6 August 1943) was a combat medic, a Senior Sergeant in the 214th Guards Rifle Regiment of the 73rd Guards Rifle Division during World War II. For her actions in battle she was posthumously awarded the title Hero of the Soviet Union on 22 February 1944.

== Civilian life ==
Mareseva was born on 20 June 1923 to a Russian family in Cherkaskoe village, located within present-day Volsky district of the Saratov Oblast; her father was a shepherd on a collective farm. After graduating from secondary school she attended medical courses until being transferred to work at a cement plant due to the start of the war.

== Military career ==
When Mareseva's father was sent to the front lines after the start of Soviet involvement in the war she repeatedly applied to join the ranks of the military after her medical training was ceased but was initially rejected. Eventually she entered military nursing courses, joining the Red Army in 1942 after graduating from her brief medical training. She was sent to the Eastern front in late November that same year as part of the 38th Rifle Division, which later received the Guards designation and became the 73rd Guards Rifle Division.

She fought on the Stalingrad, Voronezh and Steppe fronts as a medic, and for her actions in battle on 8 February 1943 she was awarded the Medal "For Battle Merit", and was awarded the Order of the Red Star after rescuing 38 injured soldiers in the Battle of Kursk. On 1 August 1943 her regiment was ordered to cross the Donets river to reach Southern Belgorod. The crossing, between the cities of Solomino and Toplinka, involved dodging heavy artillery fire and avoiding two Nazi infantry divisions worth of enemy troops; the right bank of the river contained large numbers of landmines and was fully controlled by the Axis. After a prolonged battle the Soviet Guardsmen were able to take control of a small portion of the bridgehead on the right bank, and despite heavy losses from shelling, bombings, and mortar attacks, the unit continued to proceed with the offensive. Throughout the battle, Mareseva treated wounded soldiers, and when the gunfire ceased upon nightfall she carried the wounded soldiers to the safety of the trenches on the left bank of the river.

On 2 August, after numerous casualties due to persistent Axis counterattacks, after the eighth counterattack, Soviet forces were weakened to a point that an Axis unit managed to bypass their stronghold at the left bank of the river. Heavily outnumbered, Soviet forces began to retreat, which was illegal under Order No. 227, known for enforcing the catchphrase "Not one step back!"; Mareseva, noticing the Nazi approach towards the trenches where the injured soldiers remained, and convinced the retreating soldiers to turn around and continue fighting, having grabbed her pistol and started running towards the approaching enemy fighters. In the confrontation led by Mareseva, over 150 enemy combatants were killed, and they managed to seize eight machine guns, two mortars and 20 grenade launchers. After leading the attack, she carried the injured off the battlefield and continued to treat the wounded. With their victory, the Soviets managed to improvise a safer pedestrian bridge for the transport of the wounded to the left bank as opposed to having to use a boat, but the bridge was destroyed by enemy fire overnight. On the morning of 3 August, while transporting wounded soldiers to the safety of the trenches on the left bank by boat, she used her body as a human shield to defend her fellow soldiers from a mortar attack, and died from her injuries three days later.

She was posthumously declared a Hero of the Soviet Union on 22 February 1944 for her bravery in the crossing of the river, during which she treated 64 wounded soldiers.

== Awards and recognition ==
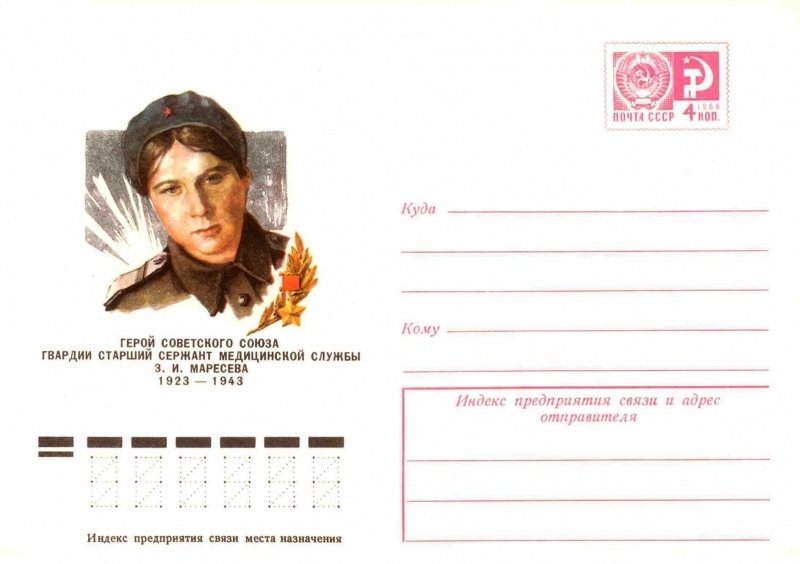
Envelope featuring Mareseva's portrait from a series of envelopes featuring various people awarded the title Hero of the Soviet Union.

Military awards

- Hero of the Soviet Union
- Order of Lenin
- Order of the Red Star
- Medal "For Battle Merit"
- Medal "For the Defence of Stalingrad"

Memorials and dedications

- An envelope featuring Mareseva's portrait was issued in 1977 as part of a series of envelopes featuring Heroes of the Soviet Union
- A medical school in her hometown of Volsk was named in her honor, and the cement factory where she was employed before the war was renamed in her honor.
- In 1953 a memorial honoring her military feat was constructed at the site of her burial in Pyatnitskaya, Belgorod.

== See also ==
- List of female Heroes of the Soviet Union
- Valeriya Gnarovskaya
- Kseniya Konstantinova
