= Vera Kharuzhaya =

Belarusian communist writer, spy, and partisan (1903–1942)

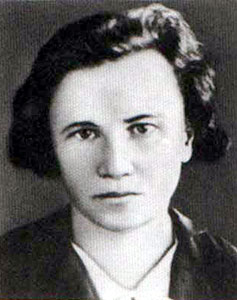
- Born: 27 September 1903; Babruysk, Russian Empire
- Died: November 1942 (aged 39); Vitebsk, Reichskommissariat Ostland
- Military career
- Allegiance: Soviet Union
- Awards: Hero of the Soviet Union; Order of Lenin; Order of the Red Banner

Vera Kharuzhaya (Belarusian: Вера Харужая, Russian: Ве́ра Заха́ровна Хору́жая, Polish: Wiera Charuża, 27 September 1903 – November 1942) was a Belarusian Communist writer, school teacher and partisan activist from the Soviet Union deployed to Poland for sabotage and espionage operation during the interbellum. She was executed as a partisan by the Germans during World War II.

== Life ==
Vera Kharuzhaya was born into the family of an administrative worker in Babruysk, Russian Empire, before the Revolution of 1905. In 1919 she graduated from a workers school in Mazyr. The town was handed over to the Bolsheviks in the Riga Peace Treaty and became part of the Byelorussian Soviet Socialist Republic. Kharuzhaya found employment in the public schools teaching, and served as Political commissar of local Komsomol branches in the areas of Mazyr and Babruysk (now eastern Belarus). In 1922-1923 she worked in the administration of the Central Committee of the Komsomol of Belarus, also working in several Belarusian Soviet newspapers.

=== Deployment to Poland ===
Since 1920 Kharuzhaya actively participated in the campaign led by the Comintern. After graduating from the senior communist party school in the Soviet Union, in February 1924 she was secretly deployed across the border to the Second Polish Republic. While in eastern Poland (present-day West Belarus), she was appointed member of the Central Committee of the Komsomol of West Belarus and printed illegal Belarusian communist papers.

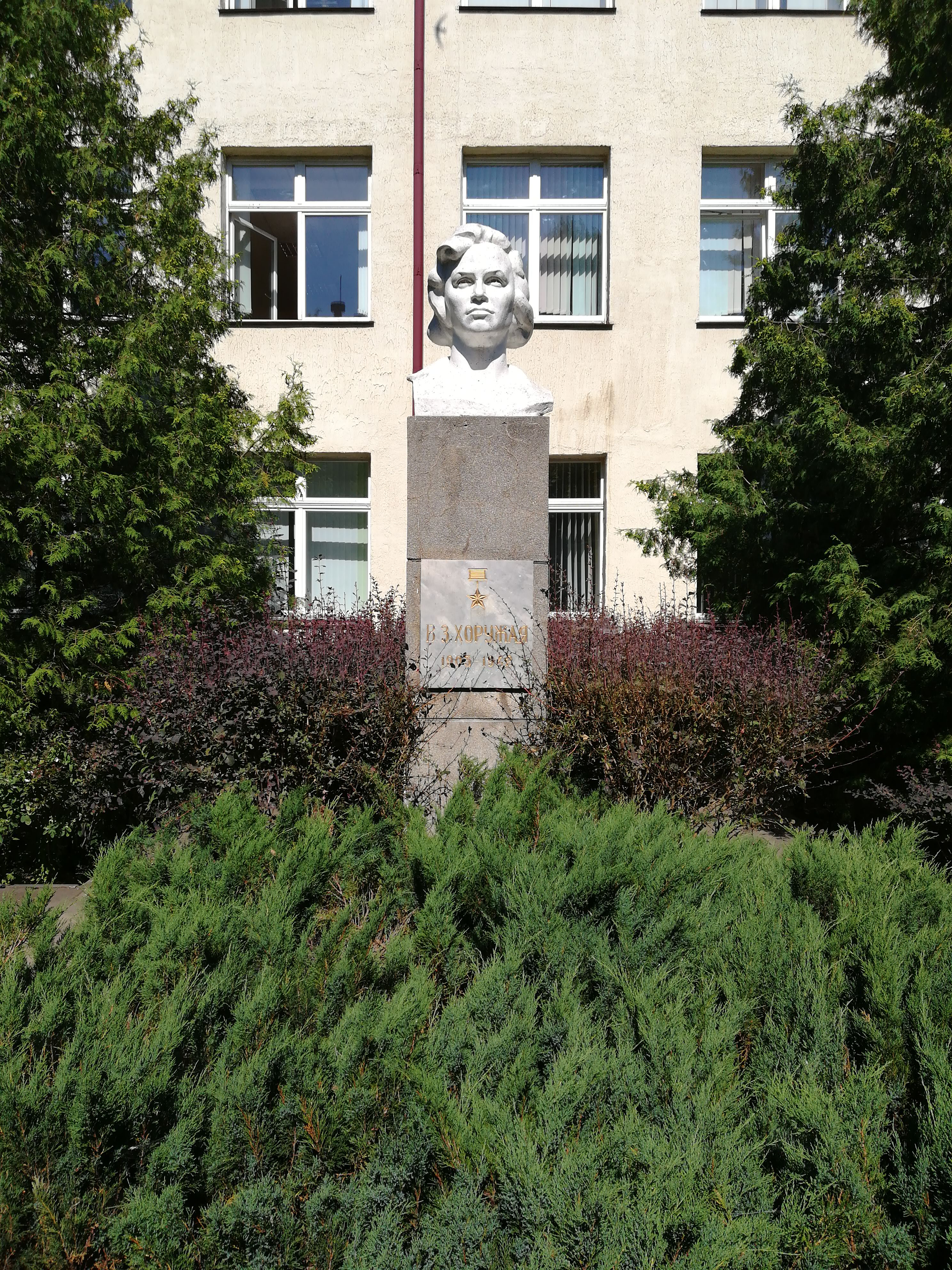
Monument to Vera Kharuzhaya in Babruysk

In September 1925, Kharuzhaya was arrested by the Poles, convicted of subversive activity and sentenced to 8 years of prison. In 1932 she was handed over to the USSR in exchange for a Polish prisoner held in a Soviet prison. In 1935, Kharuzhaya was expelled from the Communist party, following her husband denouncing her to the authorities. In 1937, during the Great Purge, she was arrested by the NKVD and spent two years in prison. In August 1939 Kharuzhaya was released. After Germany attacked the Soviet Union, Kharuzhaya joined a partisan unit. In November 1942, she was arrested and eventually executed by the Germans.

In 1960, Kharuzhaya was posthumously granted the title of Hero of the Soviet Union. On that occasion one of the streets in the centre of Minsk was renamed by the Soviets in honour of Kharuzhaya.

== See also ==
- List of female Heroes of the Soviet Union
