= Nina Gnilitskaya =

Hero of the Sovet Union

Nina Timofeevna Gnilitskaya
- Нина Тимофеевна Гнилицкая
- Born: 1 August [O.S. 19 July] 1916; Knyaginevka, Don Host Oblast, Russian Empire (located in present-day Luhansk Oblast, Ukraine)
- Died: 10 December 1941 (aged 25); Knyaginevka, Soviet Union
- Military career
- Allegiance: Soviet Union
- Branch: Red Army (Military intelligence)
- Service years: 1941
- Rank: Red Army man
- Units: 465th Separate Motorized Rifle Reconnaissance Company, 383rd Rifle Division
- Conflicts: World War II; Eastern Front †
- Awards: Hero of the Soviet Union; Order of Lenin; Medal "For Courage"

Nina Timofeevna Gnilitskaya (Russian: Нина Тимофеевна Гнилицкая; 1 August [O.S. 19 July] 1916 – 10 December 1941) was a soldier and reconnaissance scout in the 465th Separate Motorized Rifle Reconnaissance Company of the 383rd Rifle Division in the 18th Army on the Southern Front during World War II. After fighting to death in a gunfight against German soldiers when they discovered her hiding place she became the only woman reconnaissance scout in the Red Army to be awarded the title Hero of the Soviet Union after the Supreme Soviet posthumously awarded her the title on 31 March 1943.

== Early life ==
Gnilitskaya was born in 1916 to a Russian peasant family in the rural village of Knyaginevka in the Russian Empire, located in what is now Ukraine. After graduating from a small secondary school in her hometown she began working in a mine at the age of 16 as a hauler and telephone operator.

== World War II ==
Not long after Nazi Germany launched Operation Barbarossa in 1941 she applied to join the Red Army but was denied and told that she was needed to work in the mine. Not long afterward Gnilitskaya's hometown of Knyaginevka was fully taken over by Axis troops in November. On one occasion she provided shelter to a Red Army reconnaissance scout, providing him with civilian clothes before escorting him to the location his unit was stationed, stealing three horse-drawn carts from the Germans in the process; when German soldiers asked who he was she told them he was her husband. On 2 November she was accepted into the Red Army as a volunteer as part of the 465th Separate Motorized Rifle Reconnaissance Company due to her knowledge of the area under attack, having grown up in the strategically important village of Knyaginevka. In addition to providing first aid to troops she also participated in direct combat with the use of small arms and grenades as well as working as a reconnaissance scout. In the defensive campaign of Donbas she participated in multiple reconnaissance missions which involved going behind enemy lines.

On the night of 14 November 1941 she led a group of soldiers on a reconnaissance mission, during which they killed twelve German officers and the scouts managed to take valuable military documents, weapons, and a prisoner as ordered by the military command. For her scouting work she was nominated for the Order of the Red Star by the commander of the 383rd Infantry division, but the Major-General of the 18th Army lowered the award nomination to the Medal for Courage.

== Last mission and death ==
As part of a larger operation of the 18th Army to retake control of Knyaginevka and surrounding villages, the 465th Separate Motorized Rifle Reconnaissance Company was deployed on the night of 9 December to identify firing points and better estimate German troop locations, accompanied by a rifle battalion for cover. Under the command of the reconnaissance company's commissioner Spartak Zhelezny, the unit was instructed to conduct reconnaissance by fire as part of a larger effort of the 383rd Infantry division and portions of the 18th Army to expel German forces from the area. After the rifle unit accompanying the reconnaissance company failed to provide adequate cover for the scouts as they entered the Northern outskirts of the village, the group of 16 scouts found themselves surrounded by German troops and took shelter in a nearby house. German dogs detected their hiding place by approximately 01:40 and a firefight ensued. Gnilitskaya fought to the death until she ran out of ammunition but continued to refuse to surrender, even while mortally wounded. Some accounts say that she tried to commit suicide to avoid torture upon capture but failed, and German soldiers bayoneted her nearly lifeless body before throwing her into a fire, while others say that her exact cause of death was unknown. Of the 16 scouts sent on the mission, only one managed to escape the house and provide an account of what happened after he was ordered by the commissioner to leave and report the situation. The mutilated remains of the fifteen scouts killed on the mission were discovered on 4 March 1942 by Soviet troops. Both Gnilitskaya and the commissar of the reconnaissance company were posthumously awarded the title Hero of the Soviet Union on 31 March 1943.

== Memorials ==
A statue in her likeness was placed in Krasny Luch in the hero's alley to commemorate her actions in the war. Streets in Donetsk and Krasny Luch were renamed in her honor. The house where the fifteen scouts fought to the death contains a memorial plaque to the soldiers killed in the fight.

== See also ==
- List of female Heroes of the Soviet Union
- 383rd Rifle Division
- Yelizaveta Chaikina
- Yelena Stempkovskaya
