= Lyudmila Kravets =

Lyudmila Stepanovna Kravets
- Людмила Степанівна Кравець
- Born: 7 February 1923; Kushuhum, Ukrainian SSR, Soviet Union
- Died: 23 May 2015 (aged 92); Kiev, Ukraine
- Military career
- Allegiance: Soviet Union
- Branch: Main Military Medical Directorate
- Service years: 1941–1946
- Rank: Senior Sergeant
- Unit: 63rd Guards Rifle Regiment
- Conflicts: World War II; Battle of Berlin; Battle of Warsaw; Battle of Kiev
- Awards: Hero of the Soviet Union

Lyudmila Stepanovna Kravets (Russian: Людмила Степановна Кравец, Ukrainian: Людмила Степанівна Кравець; 7 February 1923 – 23 May 2015) was a medic in the 63rd Guards Rifle Regiment during World War II. For her actions in the war, she was awarded the title Hero of the Soviet Union on 31 May 1945.

== Civilian life ==
Kravets was born on 7 February 1923 in the village of Kushuhum to a working-class Ukrainian family. After completing her seventh grade of school in 1939, she went on to attend a two-year nursing course in Zaporozhye, graduating in 1941.

== Military career ==
Kravets joined the Red Army in July 1941 after the start of the Second World War, initially working in military hospitals. In 1942 her regiment fought on the Northwestern Front, in which she sustained a serious injury but returned to fighting after recovering.

She was awarded the Medal "For Courage" after a night combat mission in 1943 in which she read out an order to surrender in German while near enemy territory; 29 German soldiers surrendered the next morning.

During the Battle of Berlin on 17 April 1945, while on the outskirts of the city, she took over the duties of the company commander and participated in direct combat in the battle. Later in the battle she evacuated injured soldiers from the area under enemy fire. For her actions in battle, she was awarded the title Hero of the Soviet Union 31 May 1945 with an Order of Lenin. She was demobilized from the military in 1946.

== Later life ==
Following the war, she remained a medic in the army until transferring to the reserve in May 1946. In September the previous year she married Vladimir Ledvin, an officer she met on the front in 1944. After leaving the military she returned to Zaporozhye, but did not stay there for very long, having to live in Vladivostok in 1948 because her husband was sent there.

She lived in Dnepropetrovsk until 1951 and later Nikopol, before she and her family settled in Zaporozhye again in 1954 - their first child Valery was born in 1949 and then their daughter Irina in 1951.

Despite complications of her wounds from the war, she led an active life, visiting East Germany as part of Soviet delegations on several occasions, as well as giving lectures to schoolchildren, soldiers, and prisoners. In 1982 she moved to Kiev, where she died on 23 May 2015 at the age of 92.

== Awards ==
=== Soviet ===
- Hero of the Soviet Union (31 May 1945)
- Order of Lenin (31 May 1945)
- Order of the Patriotic War 1st class (11 March 1985)
- Three Orders of the Red Star (1 October 1943, 15 September 1944, and 7 February 1945)
- Medal "For Courage" (8 February 1943)
- campaign and jubilee medals

=== Foreign ===
- Patriotic Order of Merit (6 May 1985)
- Order of Bohdan Khmelnytsky 3rd class (14 October 1999)

== See also ==
- List of female Heroes of the Soviet Union
- Vera Kashcheyeva
- Kseniya Konstantinova
