= Vera Kashcheyeva =

Russian soldier (1922–1975)

- Вера Сергеевна Кащеева
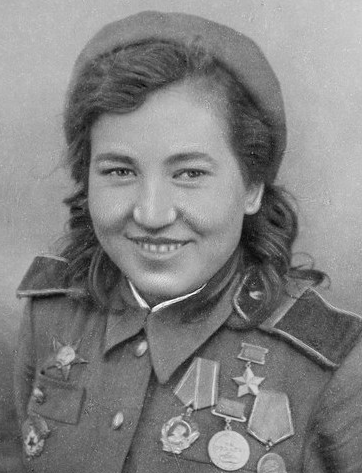
- Kashcheyeva in 1944
- Born: 15 September 1922; Petrovnka, Barnaul uezd, Altai Governorate, Russian SFSR (present-day Troitsky District, Altai Krai, Russian Federation)
- Died: 20 May 1975 (aged 52); Apsheronsk, Krasnodar Krai, Russian SFSR, Soviet Union
- Military career
- Allegiance: Soviet Union
- Branch: Red Army
- Service years: 1942–1944
- Rank: Lieutenant
- Unit: 120th Rifle Regiment
- Conflicts: World War II
- Awards: Hero of the Soviet Union; Florence Nightingale Medal

Vera Sergeyevna Kashcheyeva (Russian: Вера Сергеевна Кащеева; 15 September 1922 – 20 May 1975) was a Russian soldier. She served as a combat medic in the 120th Rifle Regiment, 39th Guards Rifle Division who was awarded the title Hero of the Soviet Union in 1944 for her actions in the Dnieper crossing.

== Early life ==
Kashcheyeva was born on 15 September 1922 to a Russian peasant family in the Petrovka, located within the present-day Altai Krai. After graduating from her seventh grade of school in her hometown she moved to the city of Barnaul, where she initially worked at a kindergarten before becoming a nurse at a textile plant in January 1940.

She became a member of the Communist Party of the Soviet Union in 1944.

== World War II ==
Initially after the German invasion of the Soviet Union, Kashcheeva remained in nursing courses until graduating in November 1941. She then repeatedly requested to be sent to the warfront, and was accepted into the Red Army in March 1942 to serve as a medic in the newly-formed 315th Rifle Division, composed of people from the Altai region. Upon completing training in August she was deployed to the warfront as part of the 362nd Rifle Regiment, but remained there only briefly before transferring to the 115th Separate Rifle Brigade before eventually settling with the 120th Guards Rifle Regiment in October. There she received her "baptism by fire" in the Battle of Stalingrad. Later during defensive operations at the Krasny Oktyabr Steel Plant, the regiment fought off as many as twenty attacks daily and downed multiple enemy aircraft and artillery points, at the price of significant casualties. Throughout constant aerial bombardment and poor weather conditions she treated wounded soldiers, as well as helping spot German snipers and deliver food.

In a mission that involved landing in Dnipropetrovsk and crossing the Dnieper river, the unit managed to provide a foothold for later troops to come. Despite incurring severe injuries and nearly bleeding to death she continued her work in reconnaissance, delivering information on enemy artillery positions to her commanding officers, which helped troops regain control of a strategic bridgehead on the right bank of the river. Only five soldiers from the initial landing group survived the fighting, including her. For her actions on that mission, she was awarded the title Hero of the Soviet Union on 22 February 1944, wherein she was praised not only for completing her mission through hardships but also inspiring other soldiers to continue on fighting.

== Later life ==
In 1944, she was demobilized from the front lines for health reasons and returned to the city of Barnaul where she graduated from medical school as a midwife in 1948 and worked as a nurse there until she got married. After getting married she and her husband moved to the Far Eastern part of Russia in Khabarovsk, where they lived until 1973. Until 1953 she was in charge of a nursery school in Bira, Jewish Autonomous Oblast. In 1973, the family moved to Apsheronsk where she worked as a paramedic and was awarded the Florence Nightingale Medal by the Red Cross.

On 20 May 1975, Kashcheyeva died in an automobile accident with her grandson and was buried in the Apsheronsk cemetery. Streets in Barnaul, Bira, and Apsheronsk bear her name.

== Awards ==
- Hero of the Soviet Union (22 February 1944)
- Order of Lenin (22 February 1944)
- Order of the Red Star (30 August 1943)
- Medal "For Courage" (12 August 1943)
- Medal "For Battle Merit" (22 January 1944)
- Florence Nightingale Medal (12 May 1973)

== See also ==
- List of female Heroes of the Soviet Union
- 39th Guards Rifle Division
- Battle of Stalingrad

== Bibliography ==
- Cottam, Kazimiera (1998). Women in War and Resistance: Selected Biographies of Soviet Women Soldiers. Newburyport, MA: Focus Publishing/R. Pullins Co. ISBN 1585101605. OCLC 228063546.
- Simonov, Andrey; Chudinova, Svetlana (2017). Женщины - Герои Советского Союза и России [Women - Heroes of the Soviet Union and Russia]. Moscow: Russian Knights Foundation and Museum of Technology Vadim Zadorozhny. ISBN 9785990960701. OCLC 1019634607.
