= Aleksandra Samusenko =

Soviet tank commander and liaison officer (1922–1945)

- Aleksandra Samusenko in 1943
- Born: 1922; Chita, Russian SFSR or Zhlobin District, Belarusian SSR, Soviet Union
- Died: 3 March 1945 (aged 22–23); Zülzefirz, Province of Pomerania, Nazi Germany (now Poland)
- Military career
- Allegiance: Soviet Union
- Branch: Red Army
- Service years: 1935–1945
- Rank: Guards Captain
- Unit: 1st Guards Tank Army
- Conflicts: World War II; Winter War; Eastern Front; Battle of Kursk; Lvov–Sandomierz Offensive; East Pomeranian Offensive (DOW)
- Awards: Order of the Patriotic War, 1st & 2nd class Order of the Red Star

Aleksandra Grigoryevna Samusenko (Russian: Александра Григорьевна Самусенко, Ukrainian: Олександра Григорівна Самусенко, Oleksandra Hryhorivna Samusenko; 1922 – 3 March 1945) was a Soviet T-34 tank commander and a liaison officer during World War II. She was the only female tanker in the 1st Guards Tank Army.

Samusenko was awarded the Order of the Red Star for bravery in the Battle of Kursk. She also received the Order of the Patriotic War 1st and 2nd class.

== Life ==
Born in Chita or in Zhlobin District, Samusenko began her tour of duty as a private in an infantry platoon. She participated in the Winter War (1939-1940) against Finland as a private in an infantry regiment. Later, she graduated from the tank academy and was assigned to the 1st Guards Tank Army. Samusenko received her Order of the Red Star when her tank crew defeated three German Tiger I tanks. Later Samusenko participated in the Lvov–Sandomierz Offensive.

U.S. Army Sergeant Joseph Beyrle, who had escaped from Stalag III-C POW camp in Alt Drewitz in early January 1945, encountered Samusenko's tank brigade in the middle of January. Beyrle, the only American soldier known to have served with both the United States Army and the Soviet Army in World War II, eventually persuaded her to allow him to fight alongside the unit on its way to Berlin, thus beginning a month-long stint in a Soviet tank battalion, where his demolitions expertise was appreciated. Beyrle, who reported that Samusenko had lost her husband and her entire family during the war, cited Samusenko as a symbol of the fortitude and courage displayed by the Soviet people during that period.

== Personal life ==
World War II veteran and writer Fabian Garin, in his book Tsvety na tankakh (Flowers on Tanks), mentioned an episode when a certain Mindlin, who fell in love with Samusenko, asked her "not to smoke and drink." Samusenko parried with "Maybe you've fallen in love?", kissed him on the head and stopped smoking and drinking thereafter.

=== Spanish Civil War ===
In his 1975 book, the Russian author Y.A. Zhukov wrote that Samusenko was a veteran of the Spanish Civil War of 1936–1939, although Garin discounted this rumor in Tsvety na tankakh. According to Garin, it came from a soldier named Balandin, who told battalion commander Zhukov that Samusenko had fought in Spain:

My [Balandin's] submachine gunner Kolka... approached her and said: "[...] I saw you already under Huesca... ¡No pasarán!" And she replies: "I don't remember you" [...]

Zhukov then asked why she concealed her service and Balandin replied that he did not know, "but for some reason many don't want to reveal that they fought in Spain". Garin, however, further cites Samusenko's boyfriend Mindlin, who later said that "she has never been there".

== Death ==
Samusenko died on 3 March 1945 at the age of 22 or 23. Samusenko died from wounds in the then-German village of Zülzefitz (70 km from Szczecin) during the East Pomeranian Offensive. There are two versions of the circumstances of her death. According to World War II veteran Pyotr Demidov, she was crushed under the tracks of a Soviet tank whose driver could not see the accompanying people in the darkness. According to another version, it was a German self-propelled artillery vehicle. She was buried in Labes, today in Poland, near the monument to William I.

On 13 March 1945, Samusenko was posthumously awarded the Order of the Patriotic War 1st class.

== See also ==
- Mariya Oktyabrskaya
- Irina Levchenko
- Aleksandra Boiko
