= Beyrle =

Beyrle is a German surname. Notable people with the surname include:

- Joseph Beyrle (1923–2004), American soldier who fought for the United States Army and the Soviet Red Army during World War II
- John Beyrle (born 1954), American diplomat
