= Stalag III-C =

German Army World War II POW camp for Allied soldiers

- Alt-Drewitz, Brandenburg (now Drzewice, Kostrzyn nad Odrą, Poland)

Site information
- Type: Prisoner-of-war camp
- Controlled by: Nazi Germany

Location
- Alt-Drewitz, Germany (pre-war borders, 1937)
- Location within Poland Location within Germany
- Coordinates: 52.6254°N 14.6028°E

Site history
- In use: 1939–1945
- Battles/wars: World War II

Garrison information
- Occupants: Polish, French, British, Yugoslav (Serbian), Belgian, Italian, American, Soviet prisoners of war

Stalag III-C was a German Army World War II prisoner-of-war camp for Allied soldiers. It was located on a plain near the village of Alt Drewitz bei Küstrin then located in the Neumark of the province of Brandenburg (now Drzewice, Kostrzyn nad Odrą, Poland), about 50 mi (80 km) east of Berlin.

Initially the camp served as a place of internment for several thousand soldiers and NCOs from Poland, France, Britain, Yugoslavia and Belgium. From 1943, a number of Italian POWs were also held there. From 1944, soldiers from the United States of America were kept there too. The majority of the Soviet prisoners (up to 12,000) were killed or starved to death. Most of the lower rank prisoners were sent to Arbeitskommandos to work in industry and on farms in Brandenburg. However the administration stayed with the Stammlager.

== Timeline ==
- June 1940: the camp was established 6 km (3.7 mi) from Küstrin (Kostrzyn nad Odrą) for Belgian and French prisoners from the Battle of France.
- May to June 1941: Yugoslavian prisoners and British prisoners arrived from the Balkans Campaign.
- July 1941: Soviet prisoners taken during Operation Barbarossa arrived. They were held in separate facilities and suffered severe conditions and starvation. They were not accorded the treatment required by the Third Geneva Convention. Thousands of them died of starvation and disease.
- September 1943: Italians who had been interned because of the Italian Armistice arrived.
- September 1944: the first Americans arrived, taken prisoner as a result of the failure of Operation Market Garden or during the advance of the U.S. Army towards Germany.
- 1 December 1944: the roster showed 2,036 Americans, 631 Belgians, 1,416 British, 17,568 French, 1,046 Italian, 2 Polish, 1,591 Serbian, and 13,727 Soviet prisoners.
- December 1944: more American prisoners arrived, taken prisoner in the Battle of the Bulge.
- January 31, 1945: the camp was freed by the Red Army. Many Americans escaped during the January 31, 1945 assault. The remaining American and British prisoners were eventually moved by train to Odessa on the Black Sea for repatriation.

== Escapes ==
Joseph Beyrle was a paratrooper in the 506th Parachute Infantry Regiment of the 101st Airborne Division. Captured in Normandy in June 1944 he was taken to a POW camp. He escaped twice, and when recaptured he was sent to Stalag III-C. Early in January 1945 he escaped again and made his way to a Soviet tank battalion. He convinced the legendary tank brigade commander Alexandra Samusenko (allegedly the only female tank officer of that rank in World War II) to allow him to fight with them. He is believed to be the only American serviceman to have actually fought in a Soviet unit. Wounded during a German air attack, he was evacuated to a Soviet military hospital, from where he was sent to Moscow to the U.S. Embassy. (His son, John Beyrle, returned there to serve as United States Ambassador to Russia 2008–2012.)

Walter Mehlhaff was captured 19 September 1944 while fighting with the 16th Infantry Regiment, 1st Infantry Division, on the German border. Imprisoned at Stalag III-C, he escaped from a work group early in January 1945. He made his way towards Poland and finally was taken to Odessa for repatriation.

== See also ==
- List of German World War II POW camps
