= Kostrzyn nad Odrą =

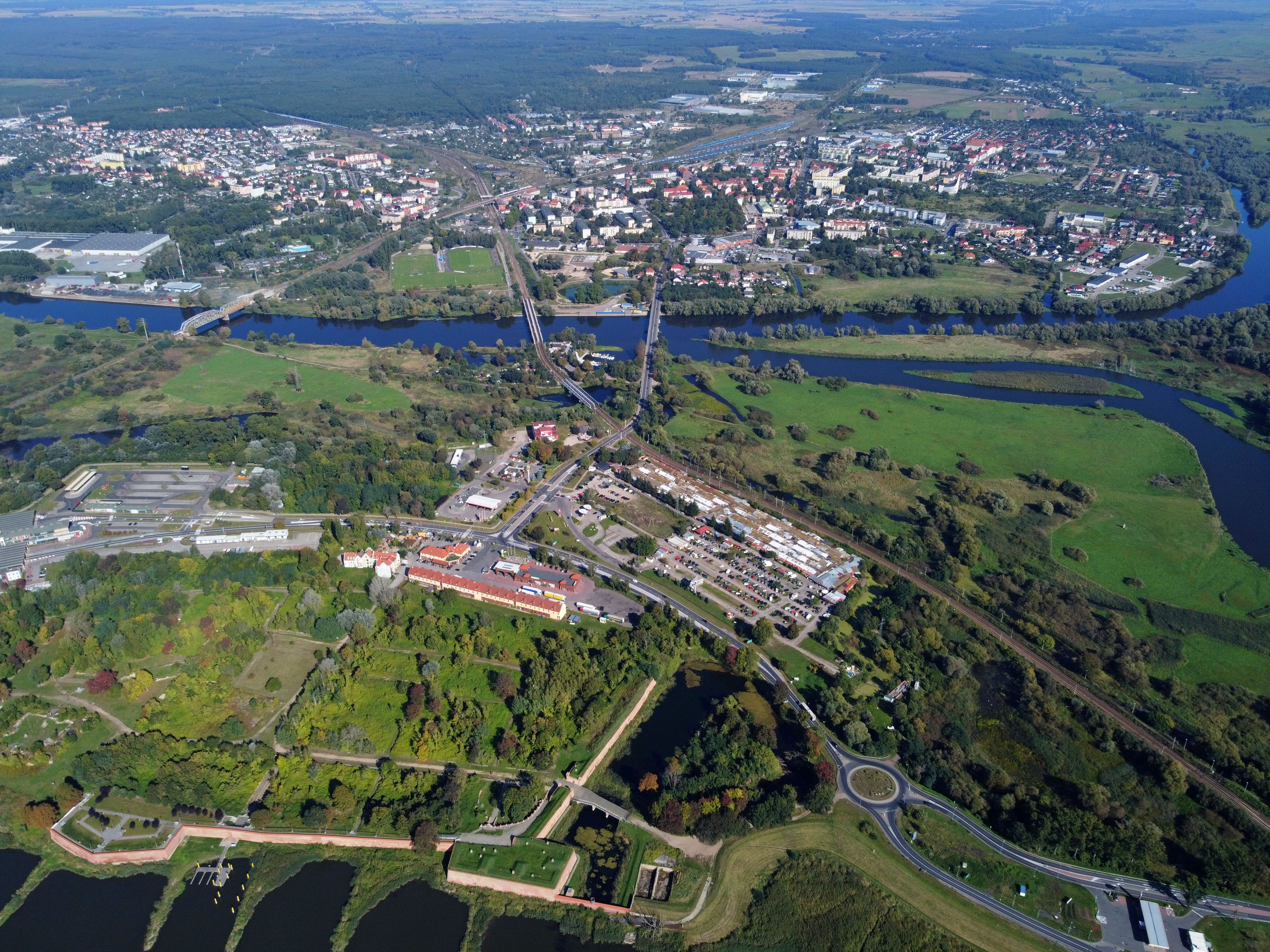
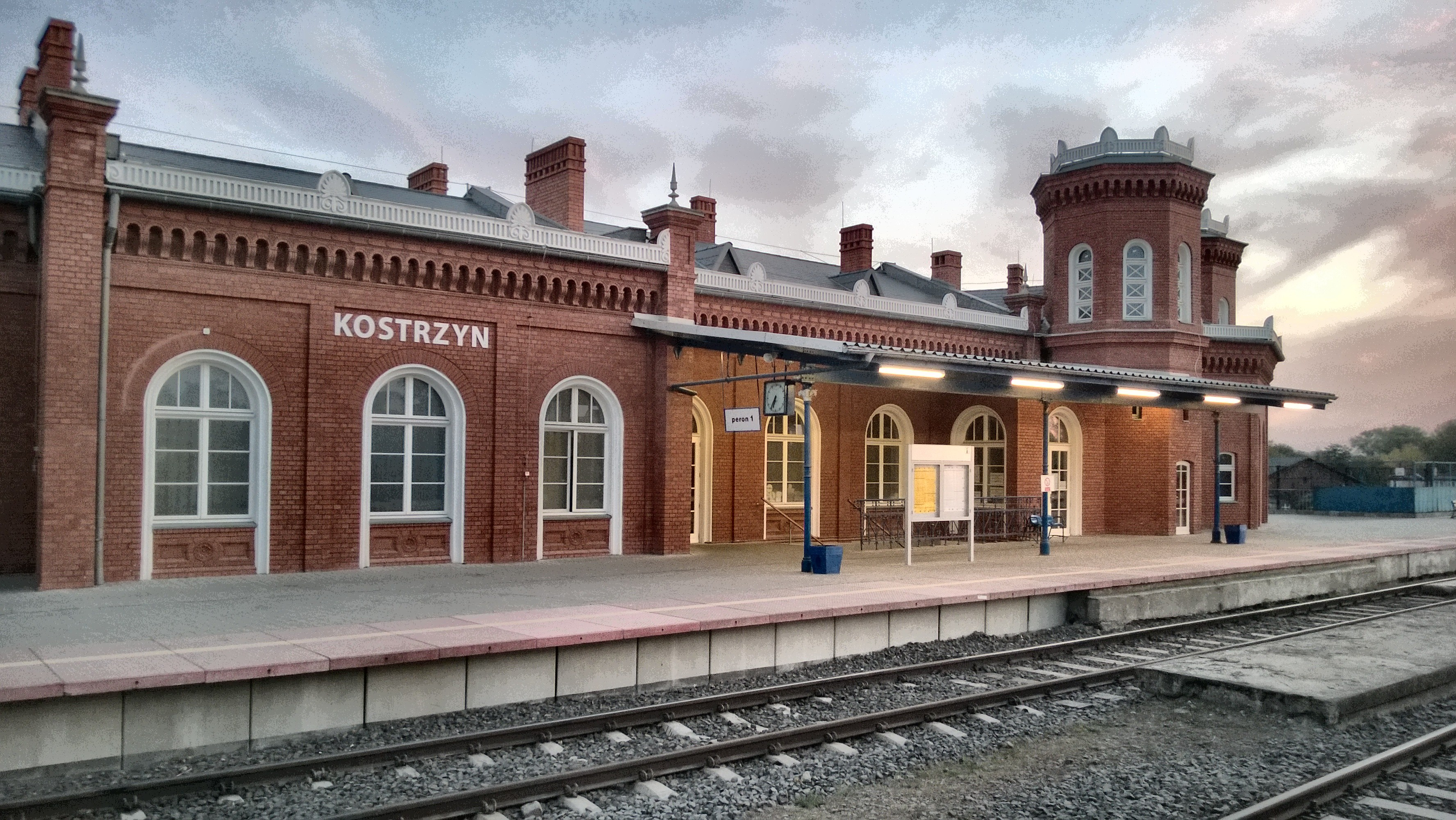
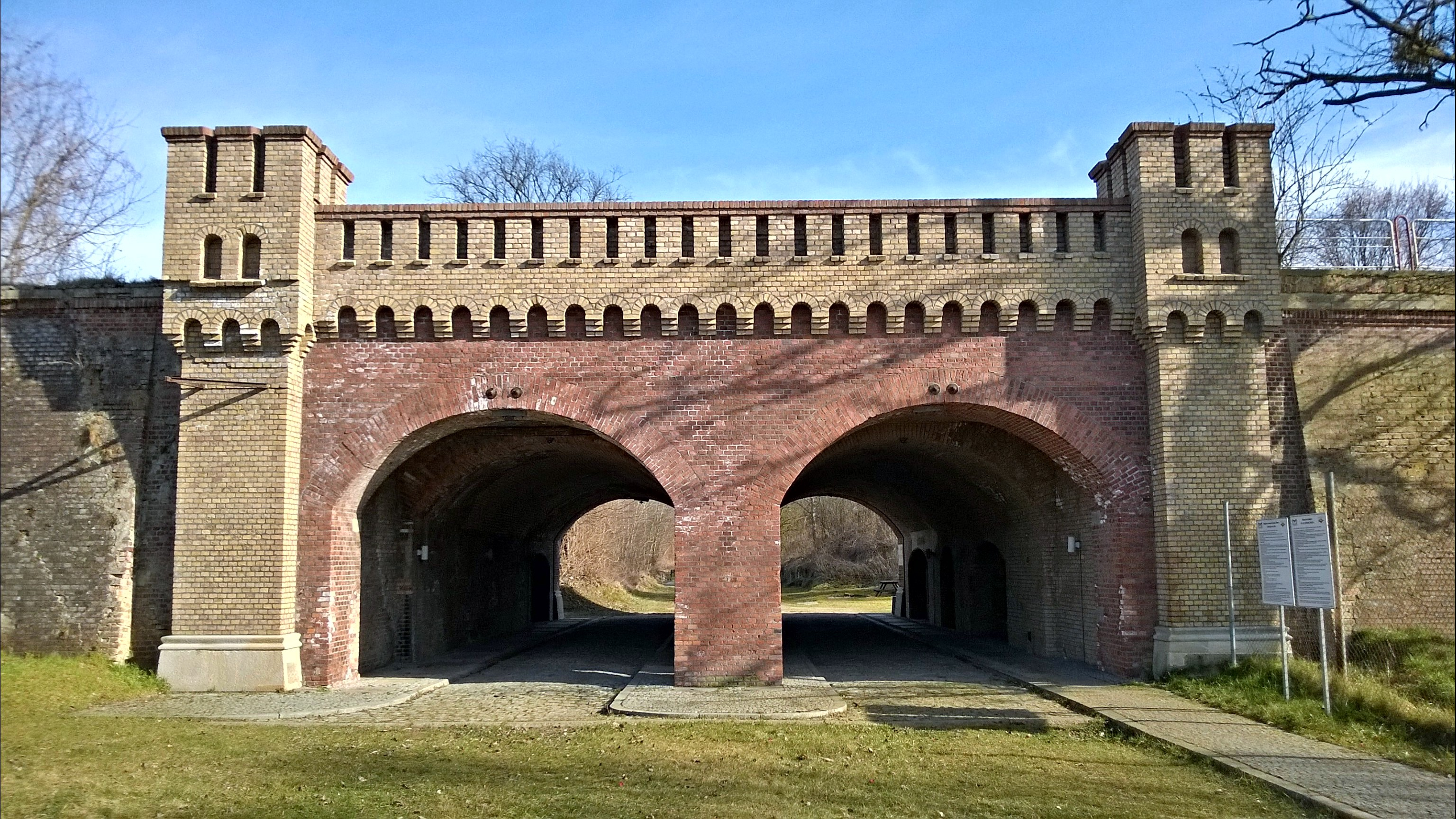
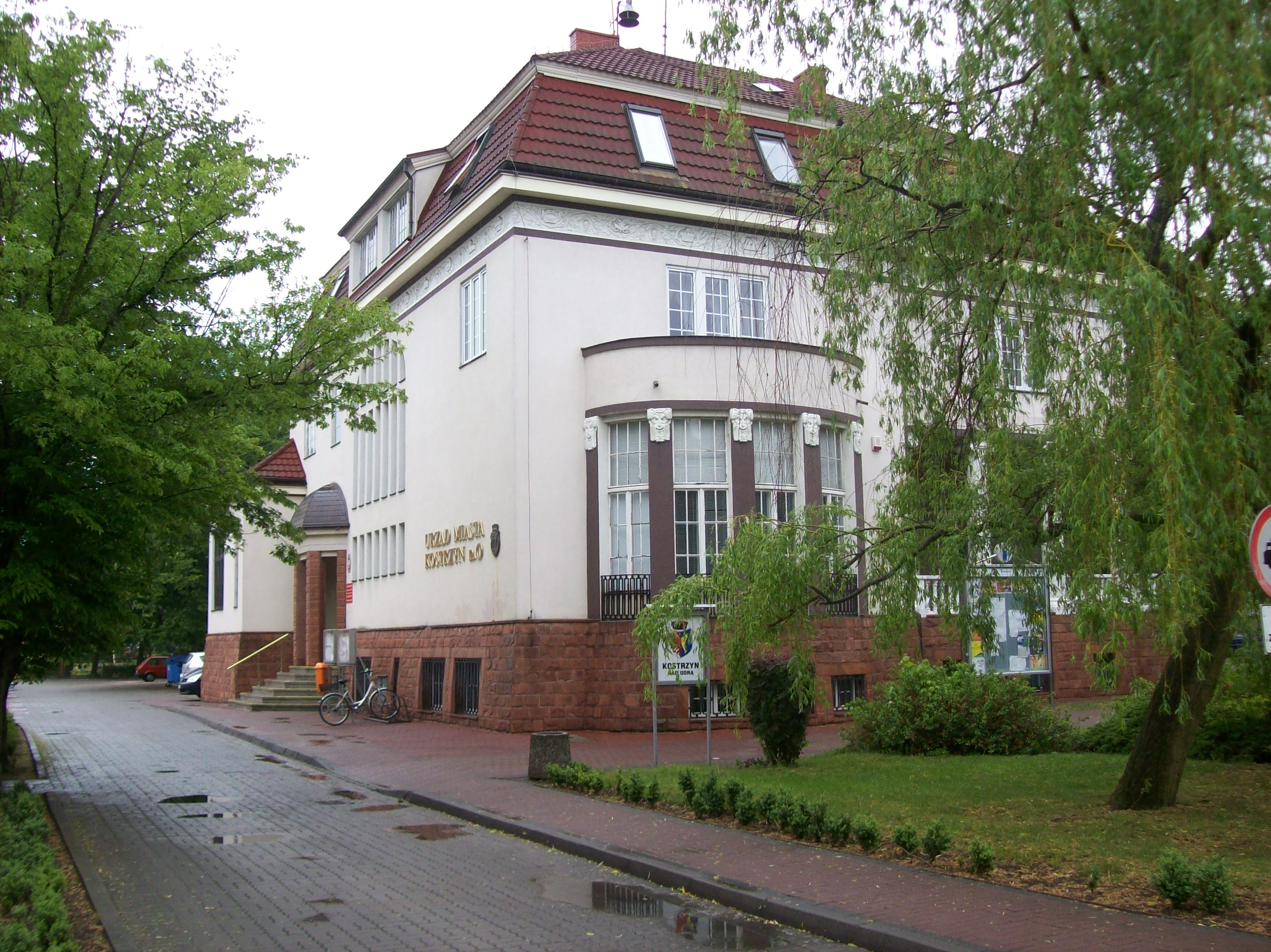
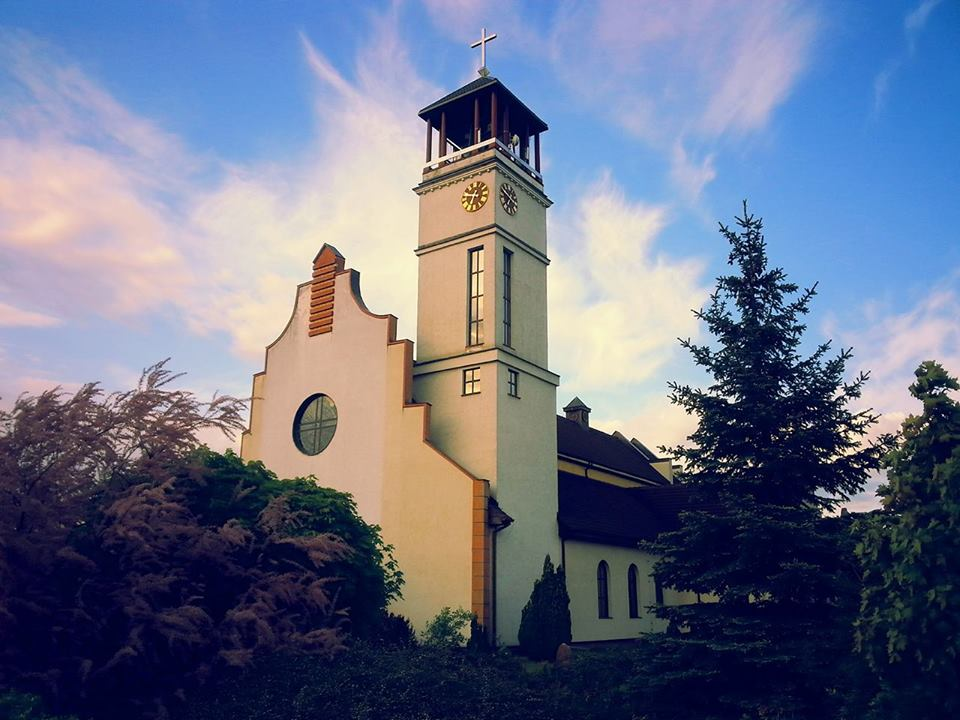
- Aerial view Railway station Berlin Gate Wedding Palace Mother of God of Rokitno church

- Flag Coat of arms

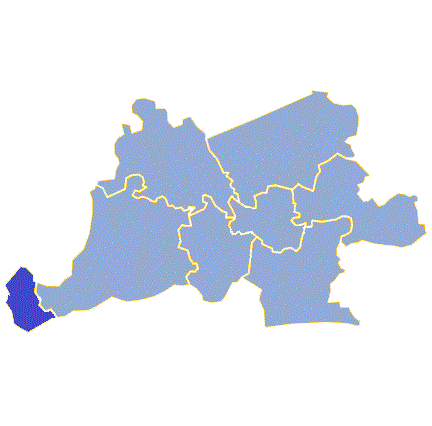
- Location in Gorzów County

- Location within Poland
- Coordinates: 52°35′18″N 14°40′0″E
- Country: Poland
- Voivodeship: Lubusz
- County: Gorzów
- Gmina: Kostrzyn nad Odrą (urban gmina)
- Established: 13th century
- Town rights: 1300

Government
  - Mayor: Andrzej Kunt

Area
  - Total: 46.17 km^{2} (17.83 sq mi)

Population (2019-06-30)
  - Total: 17,778
  - Density: 385.1/km^{2} (997.3/sq mi)
- Time zone: UTC+1 (CET)
  - Summer (DST): UTC+2 (CEST)
- Postal code: 66-470
- Area code: +48 95
- Vehicle registration: FGW
- Climate: Cfb
- Website: http://www.kostrzyn.pl

Kostrzyn nad Odrą (translated literally as Kostrzyn upon the Oder; Polish pronunciation: [ˈkɔst.ʂɨn ˌnad ˈɔdrɔ̃]; German: Küstrin [kʏsˈtʁiːn]) commonly known as Kostrzyn is a town in Gorzów County, Lubusz Voivodeship in western Poland, on the border with Germany.

== Geography ==
The town is situated within the historic Lubusz Land (Ziemia Lubuska) region at the confluence of the Oder and Warta rivers, on the western rim of the extended Warta mires. The town centre is located about 90 kilometres (56 mi) south of Szczecin.

Until the end of World War II and the implementation of the Oder–Neisse line in 1945, the municipal area also comprised the Küstrin-Kietz suburb on the west bank of the Oder river, which today is part of the German Küstriner Vorland municipality. The former town centre, the Kostrzyn fortress located on the headland between the Oder and Warta rivers, was destroyed by the Red Army as an act of revenge weeks before the end of WW2 and not rebuilt. Today Kostrzyn's central area is located around Kostrzyn railway station east of the Warta's mouth.

== History ==
=== Middle Ages ===
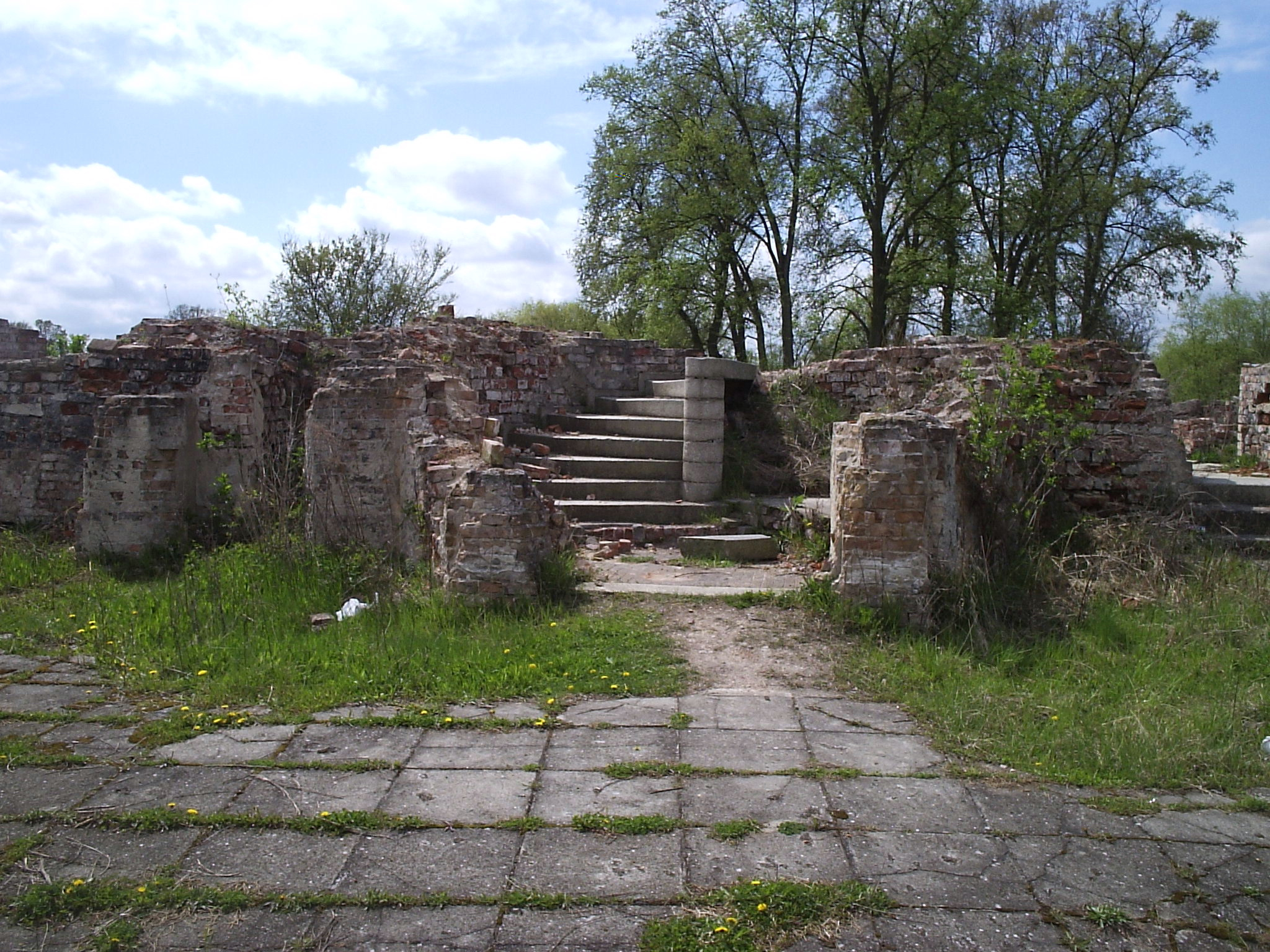
Castle ruins

Settled since the Bronze Age, the area was held by the Piast dukes and kings of Poland from about 960 until 1261, who had a gord laid out in the borderlands with the Pomeranian tribes in the north. Duke Mieszko I used Kostrzyn's strategic location as a staging area during his expedition to the Battle of Cedynia in 972. Likewise, beginning in 1002, his successor Bolesław I the Brave used the area to prepare for conquests and battles in the German–Polish War against King Henry II.

In 1223 Duke Władysław Odonic of Greater Poland granted the fortress to the Knights Templar. The name of the town was first mentioned in 1232 in a Polish letter by the Lubusz bishop Wawrzyniec to the Knights Templar, in which the old Slavic name Cozsterine (hence the later German name Küstrin) was mentioned. In the 12th century it developed into a fortified castellany and a Polish taxation post, however, together with Lubusz Land it was seized by the Ascanian margraves of Brandenburg in 1261 and incorporated into their Neumark territory east of the Oder river. By 1300 the town had received Magdeburg town rights from Margrave Albert III of Brandenburg and started to grow rapidly, owing largely to trade on the rivers. From 1319 there was a dispute over the town between the Piasts, the Griffins and the Ascanians, and there were heavy fights between the Duchy of Pomerania and the Duchy of Saxe-Wittenberg in the area in 1322–1323. A peace treaty between Pomerania and Saxe-Wittenberg was signed in the town on 5 December 1323.

In 1373 the town became part of the Lands of the Bohemian Crown (or Czech Lands), ruled by the Luxembourg dynasty. In 1402, the Luxembourgs reached an agreement with Poland in Kraków, under which Poland was to buy and reincorporate Kostrzyn and the surrounding region, but eventually the Luxembourgs sold the town to the Teutonic Order. After the Thirteen Years’ War broke out in 1454, the Teutonic Knights sold the town to Brandenburg in order to raise funds for war against Poland.

=== Modern era ===
The town in around 1700

In 1535–1571 the town was the seat of John of Brandenburg-Küstrin, who made it the capital of the Neumark region and built a castle. With time this castle was expanded into a fortress, one of the largest such facilities in the region. The town's development was hampered by the expansion of the fortress, as the area available for urban development was limited, and staple rights and high customs duties, which often caused merchants to bypass the town. During the Second Northern War, in 1658, Stefan Czarniecki passed through Chyża on his way to relieve Polish-allied Denmark from Swedish occupation.

While still crown prince, Frederick the Great was imprisoned in the fortress, from which he witnessed the execution of his friend Hans Hermann von Katte on 6 November 1730. In the 18th century, the city consisted of the Old Town, the Short Suburb and the Long Suburb.

The town was besieged by the Russians during the Seven Years' War. In 1806 the fortress surrendered to the French without a fight and then was occupied by a French military garrison for the remainder of the Napoleonic Wars. The Polish 5th Infantry Regiment was stationed there in 1810–1811. During the French retreat from the east in 1814, the town was set on fire and burnt to the ground.

The town recovered and became one of the most important railway hubs in the Kingdom of Prussia and later the German Empire. One of the main escape routes for surviving insurgents of the Polish November Uprising from partitioned Poland to the Great Emigration led through the town. Some 640 Polish insurgents of the Greater Poland Uprising of 1848 were imprisoned in the local fortress by the Prussians, including Wawrzyniec Benzelstjerna Engeström, Aleksander Babiński, Ignacy Wendziński, Konstanty Borzęcki and Antoni Szymborski, grandfather of Nobel laureate in Literature Wisława Szymborska. In June 1848, imprisoned insurgents staged a rebellion, which was joined by part of the garrison. The rebellion was suppressed, but ultimately, fearing that the Poles would capture the fortress, the Prussians released them.

In 1857 the town was linked to Berlin and Frankfurt (Oder) and in 1875 with Stettin (Szczecin) on the Pomeranian coast. In 1900 its population reached 16,473, including the garrison of the fortress.

=== 20th century ===
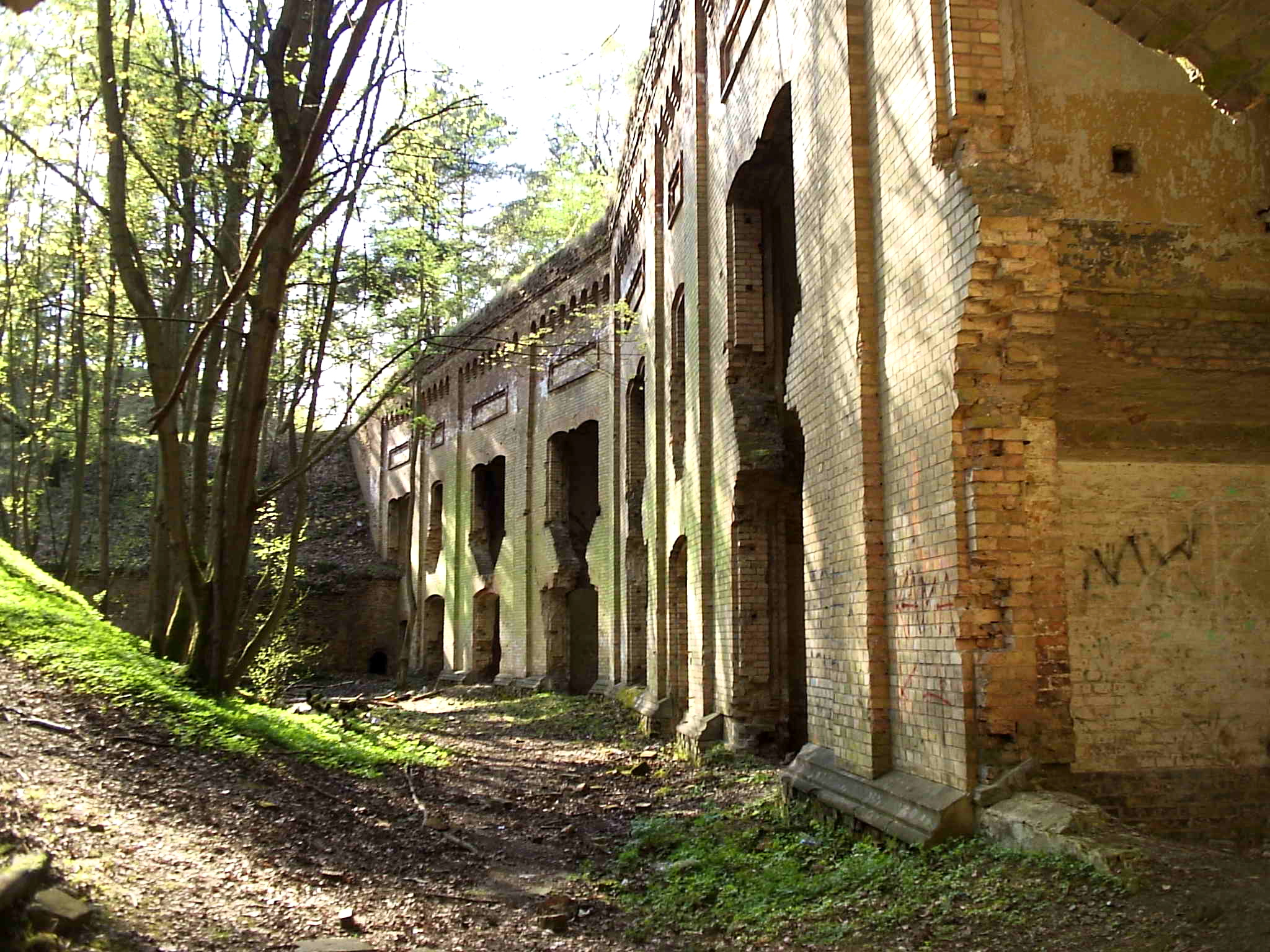
Fort Sarbinowo, which housed the German prisoner-of-war camp for Allied officers during World War I

During World War I, a German strict regime prisoner-of-war camp for French, Russian, Belgian, British and Canadian officers was operated at the local fortress. Notable inmates included Leefe Robinson, Jocelyn Lee Hardy, Roland Garros and Jules Bastin, who all made unsuccessful escape attempts. It is considered the only German POW camp of World War I from which no one managed to escape.

In September 1923, the Black Reichswehr attempted a putsch from the Küstrin Fortress, but it was suppressed by the regular Reichswehr.

At the outbreak of World War II Küstrin had 24,000 inhabitants. During the war, the Germans used Polish prisoners of war as forced labourers to build the Stalag III-C POW camp in the present-day district of Drzewice. It housed Polish, French, Serbian, Soviet, Italian, British, American and Belgian POWs. In 1943–45 the town also housed a sub-camp of the Sachsenhausen concentration camp, whose prisoners were Poles, Ukrainians, Russians, Germans, French, Belgians and Dutch, with Poles and Russians treated particularly badly either by guards or ethnic German camp elders, and a number of German forced labour camps. Due to Allied air raids on the railway hub and local factories and its position as a German bridgehead on the east bank of the Oder during the Battle of the Oder-Neisse and the Battle of the Seelow Heights, almost 95% of its buildings were destroyed (including all 32 of the city's factories) and the town was generally deserted. The town was captured by the Red Army on 11 March 1945. Soviet troops killed some American POWs mistaking them for enemy troops.

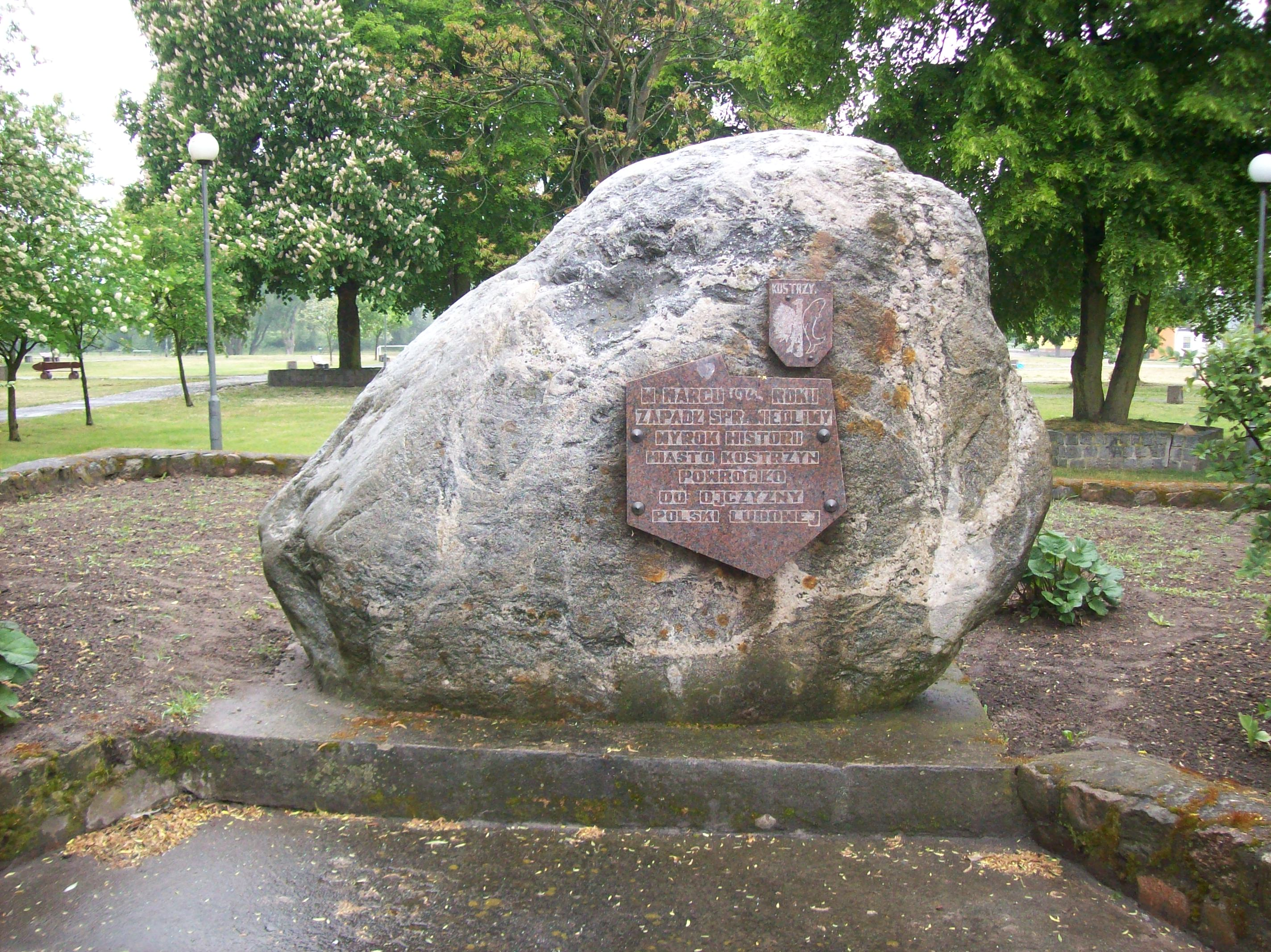
Memorial to the return of Kostrzyn to Poland in 1945

After the war the ruined town became part of Poland by decision of the Potsdam Conference; Germans remaining in the town were expelled westward. The town was repopulated by Poles, many of whom were refugees from Soviet-annexed former eastern Poland, from where they had been displaced by Soviet authorities in accordance to new borders decided at Yalta Conference, while most were re-settlers from central Poland.

The remnants of the old town within the fortress walls, including the castle in which the young Frederick the Great had been imprisoned, were razed after the war and the bricks were used to rebuild Polish cities elsewhere. More recently, plans to rebuild some of the old town in a historical style were considered, but this project appears to be on hold. The section of the town on the west bank of the Oder remained in Germany and is now called Küstrin-Kietz. Between 2004 and 2019 Kostrzyn hosted the annual Pol'and'Rock Festival (formerly Przystanek Woodstock) in the summer, the largest open-air music festival in Europe and one of the largest in the world.

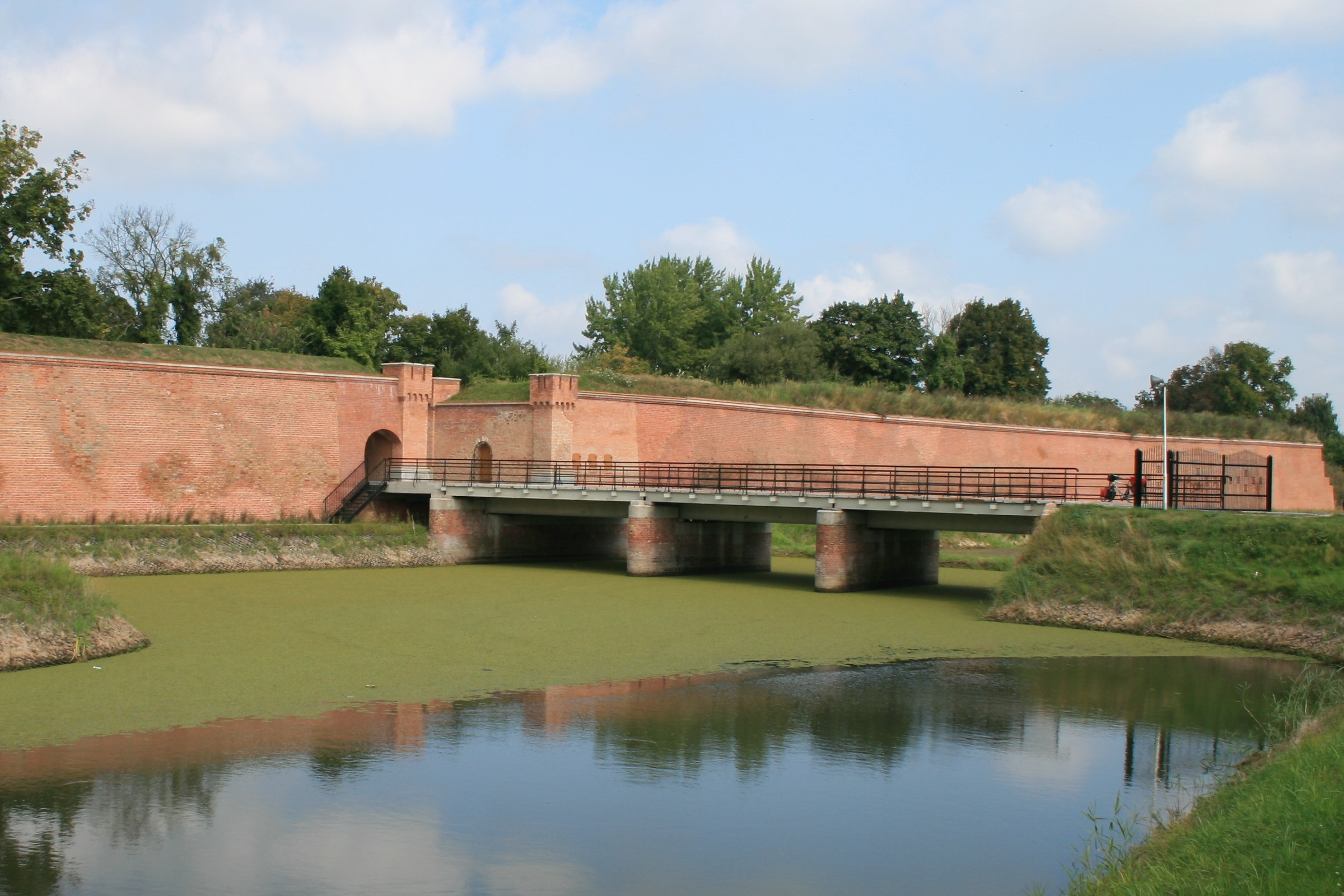
Kostrzyn nad Odrą Fortress

=== Population in selected years ===
Historical population

Year	Pop.	±%
1880	14,069	—
1890	16,672	+18.5%
1900	16,473	−1.2%
1910	17,600	+6.8%
1925	19,383	+10.1%

Year	Pop.	±%
1939	23,771	+22.6%
1960	6,843	−71.2%
1971 (est.)	11,000	+60.7%
2010	17,704	+60.9%

Note that the above numbers are based on primary, possibly inaccurate or biased sources.

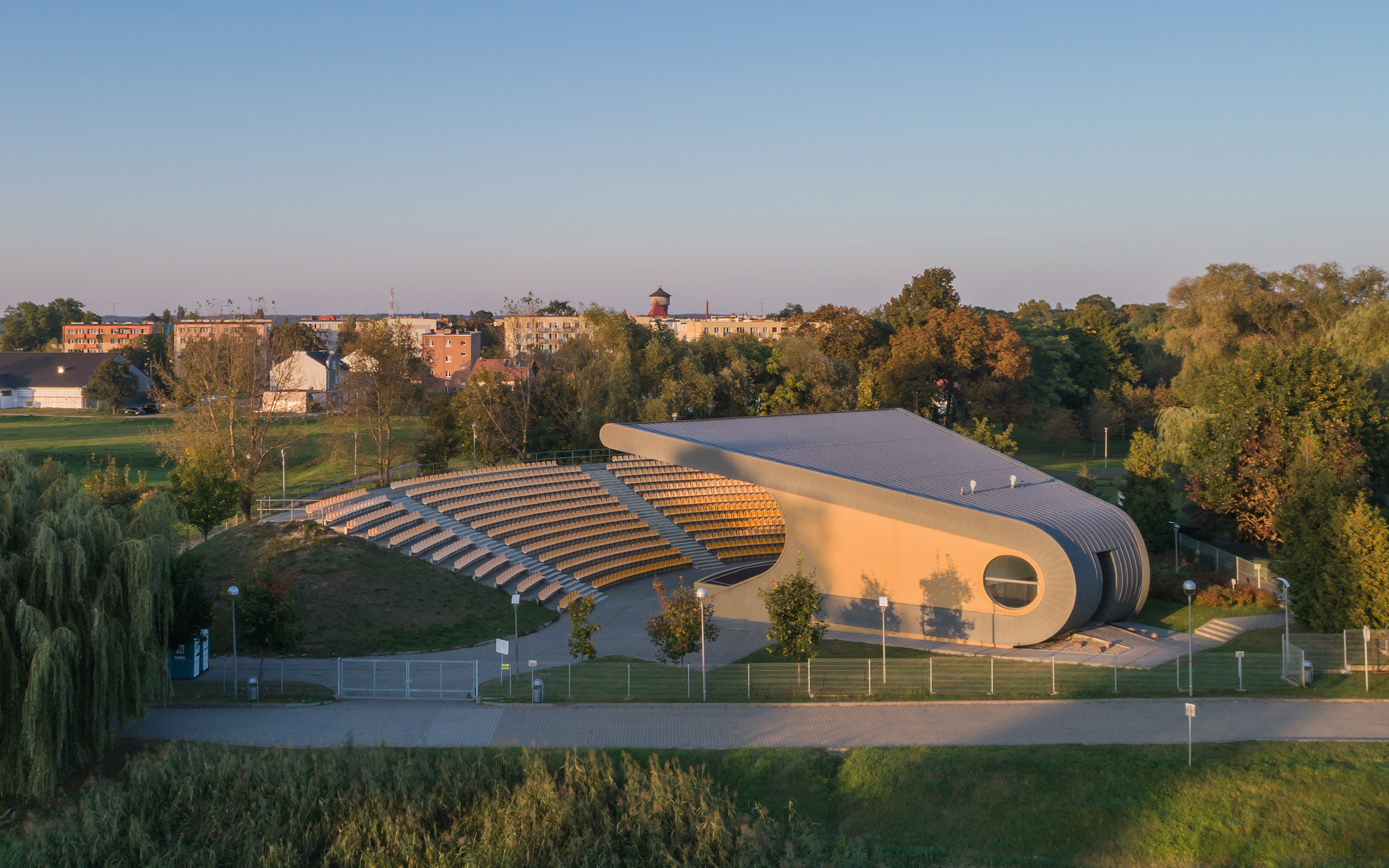
Amphitheatre in Kostrzyn nad Odrą

== Sports ==
The local football club is Celuloza Kostrzyn nad Odrą. It competes in the lower leagues.

== Industry ==
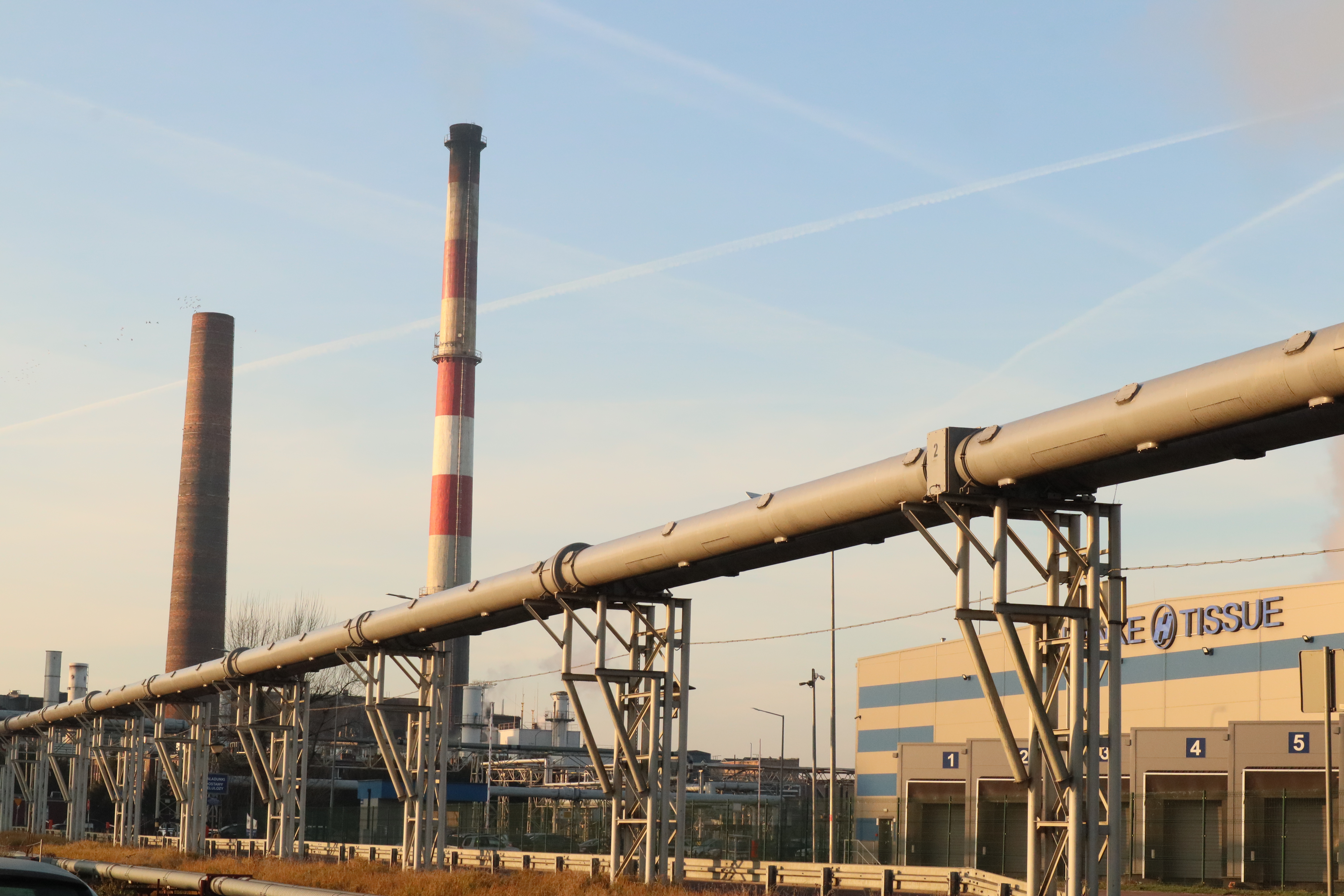
Paper mills in Kostrzyn

Kostrzyn is an industrial town with various factories. Arctic Paper (a paper manufacturer), Hanke Tissue (a hygiene products manufacturer) and ICT Poland (a stationery manufacturer) all have factories in western Kostrzyn.

== Notable people ==
- Jan Latalski (1463–1540), medieval Archbishop of Gniezno
- Kaspar von Barth (1587–1658), philologist
- Christian Albert, Burgrave and Count of Dohna (1621–1677), Prussian general
- Philipp von Stosch (1691–1757), Prussian antiquarian
- Alfred von Tirpitz (1849–1930), German grand admiral
- Fedor von Bock (1880–1945), German field marshal
- Gerhard Matzky (1894–1983), German general
- Joseph Kushner (1922–1985), American property developer
- Dariusz Dudka (born 1983), Polish footballer
- Grzegorz Wojtkowiak (born 1984), Polish footballer
- Łukasz Fabiański (born 1985), Polish footballer

== Twin towns – sister cities ==
Kostrzyn nad Odrą is twinned with:

- Seelow, Germany
- Peitz, Germany
- Sambir, Ukraine
