= Joseph Beyrle =

United States Army soldier (1923–2004)

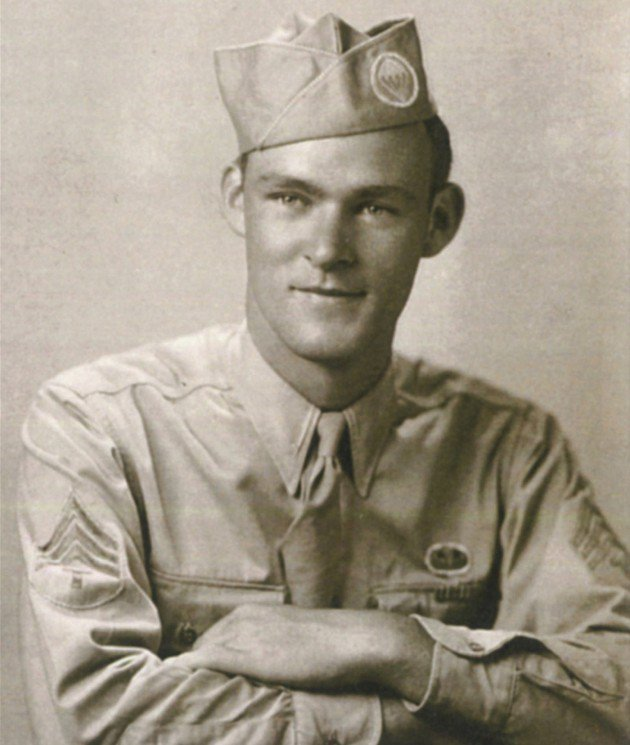
- Beyrle in Ramsbury, 1943
- Born: August 25, 1923; Muskegon, Michigan, U.S.
- Died: December 12, 2004 (aged 81); Toccoa, Georgia, U.S.
- Burial place: Arlington National Cemetery
- Spouse: JoAnne Hollowell
- Children: 3 including John
- Military career
- Allegiance: United States; Soviet Union (briefly)
- Branch: United States Army; Red Army
- Service years: 1942–1945
- Rank: Staff Sergeant
- Nickname: "Jumpin' Joe"
- Units: 506th Parachute Infantry Regiment, 101st Airborne Division; 1st Battalion, 1st Guards Tank Brigade, Red Army
- Conflicts: World War II; Operation Overlord
- Awards: Bronze Star; Purple Heart; World War II Victory Medal; French Croix de guerre; Soviet Order of the Red Banner; Medal "For the Liberation of Warsaw"

Joseph Robert Beyrle (pron. BYE-er-lee) (Russian: Джозеф Роберт Байерли; romanized: Dzhozef Robert Bayyerli; August 25, 1923 – December 12, 2004) was the only known American soldier to have served in combat with both the United States Army and the Soviet Red Army in World War II. He took part in Mission Albany, the airborne landings of the 101st Airborne Division on June 5–6, 1944, as a member of the 506th Parachute Infantry Regiment. He was captured by the Germans and sent east as a prisoner of war.

After several unsuccessful attempts, Beyrle escaped from the German Stalag III-C in January 1945 and joined a Soviet tank battalion under the command of Aleksandra Samusenko. Wounded, he was evacuated and eventually made his way to the United States in April 1945. Beyrle died in 2004 and was buried at Arlington National Cemetery. His son John Beyrle later became the United States Ambassador to Russia.

== Early life ==
Joseph Beyrle was born in Muskegon, Michigan on August 25, 1923. He was the fifth of seven children born to William and Elizabeth Beyrle, whose parents had come to America from Germany in the 1800s. He was six years old when the Great Depression struck; his father, a factory worker, lost his job. The family was evicted from their home and was forced to move in with Joseph's grandmother. Some of his earliest memories, Beyrle later told his children, were of standing in government food lines with his father. He was noted for his athletic excellence in track and field in high school, but after Pearl Harbor he declined a scholarship at Notre Dame and instead joined the army.

His two older brothers dropped out of high school and joined the Civilian Conservation Corps, an unemployment work-relief program, sending home enough money to allow the rest of the family to stay together. His older sister died of scarlet fever at age 16.

== United States Army ==
Upon his enlistment, Beyrle volunteered to become a paratrooper, and after completing basic airborne infantry training at Camp Toccoa he was assigned to the 506th Parachute Infantry Regiment of the 101st Airborne Division, the "Screaming Eagles". Beyrle specialized in radio communications and demolition, and was first stationed in Ramsbury, England, to prepare for the upcoming Allied invasion from the west. After nine months of training, Beyrle completed two missions in occupied France in April and May 1944, delivering gold to the French Resistance.

On June 6, D-Day, Beyrle's C-47 came under enemy fire over the Normandy coast, and he was forced to jump from the exceedingly low altitude of 360 feet (110 meters). After landing on the grounds of the church in Saint-Côme-du-Mont, Sergeant Beyrle lost contact with his fellow paratroopers, but succeeded in blowing up a power station. He performed other sabotage missions before being captured by German soldiers a few days later.

== Prisoner of war ==
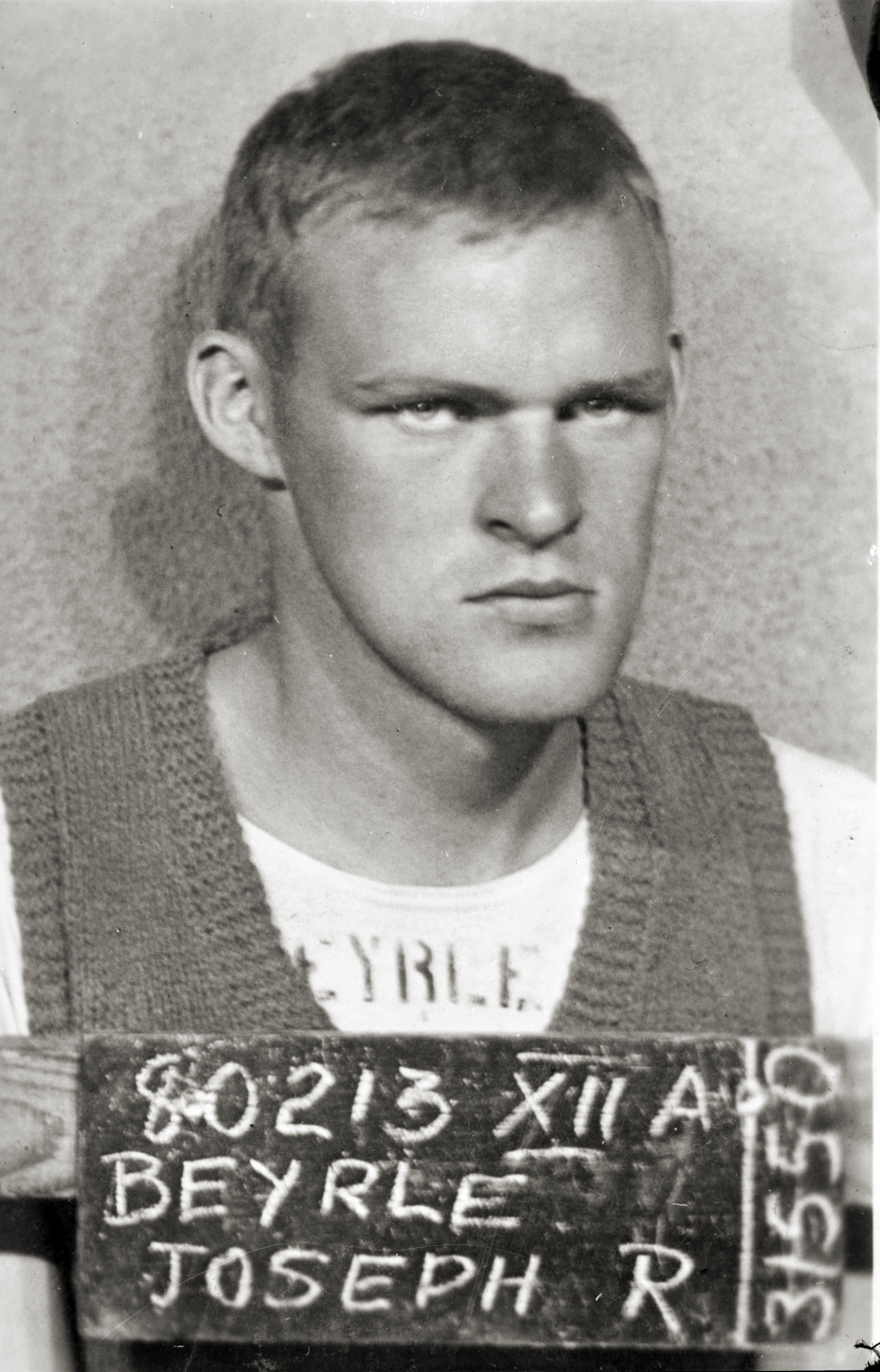
Beyrle as a POW, fall 1944

Over the next seven months, Beyrle was held in seven German prisons. He escaped twice, and was both times recaptured. Beyrle and his fellow prisoners had been hoping to find the Red Army, which was a short distance away. After the second escape (in which he and his companions set out for Poland but boarded a train to Berlin by mistake), Beyrle was turned over to the Gestapo by a German civilian. Beaten and tortured, he was released to the German military after officials stepped in and determined that the Gestapo had no jurisdiction over prisoners of war. The Gestapo were about to shoot Beyrle and his comrades, claiming that he was an American spy who had parachuted into Berlin.

Beyrle endured much cruelty during his time as a POW. He was hospitalized with a bashed head, was forced to march through Paris where he had rotten food thrown at him and was spat on, and he was confined to a small boxcar with 80 other men for a week during which time the convoy was strafed.

Beyrle was taken to the Stalag III-C POW camp in Alt Drewitz, from which he escaped in early January 1945 after executing an escape plan with other prisoners. He headed east, hoping to meet up with the Soviet army. Encountering a Soviet tank brigade in the middle of January, he raised his hands, holding a pack of Lucky Strike cigarettes, and shouted in Russian, 'Amerikansky tovarishch! ("American comrade!"). Beyrle was eventually able to persuade the battalion's commander (Aleksandra Samusenko, reportedly the only female tank officer of that rank in the war) to allow him to fight alongside the unit on its way to Berlin. Beyrle began a month-long stint in a Soviet tank battalion, where his demolitions expertise was appreciated.

== Soviet Army ==
Beyrle's new battalion, the 1st Guards Tank Army, was the one that freed his former camp, Stalag III-C, at the end of January, but in the first week of February, he was wounded in the leg during an attack by German dive bombers. He was evacuated to a Soviet hospital in Landsberg an der Warthe (now Gorzów Wielkopolski in Poland), where he received a visit from Soviet Marshal Georgy Zhukov, who, intrigued by the only non-Soviet in the hospital, learned his story through an interpreter, and provided Beyrle with official papers in order to rejoin American forces.

Joining a Soviet military convoy, Beyrle arrived at the U.S. embassy in Moscow in February 1945, only to learn that he had been reported by the U.S. War Department as killed in action on June 10, 1944, in France. This was likely due to the fact that his dog tags were recovered off the body of a dead German soldier. A funeral mass had been held in his honor in Muskegon, and his obituary was published in the local newspaper. Embassy officers in Moscow, unsure of his bona fides, placed him under Marine guard in the Metropol Hotel until his identity was established through his fingerprints. He was discharged in November 1945.

== Post-military ==
Beyrle returned home to Michigan on April 21, 1945, and celebrated V-E Day two weeks later in Chicago. He was married to JoAnne Hollowell in 1946 in the same church and by the same priest who had held his funeral mass two years earlier. Beyrle worked for Brunswick Corporation for 28 years, retiring as a shipping supervisor.

On September 27, 1994, Beyrle was publicly recognized by President Bill Clinton during a ceremony honoring American and Russian veterans of World War II in the White House Rose Garden, attended by Russian President Boris Yeltsin. Clinton recounted Beyrle's service with both armies and asked Beyrle and his son John, then a White House adviser on Russian affairs, to stand for recognition. Some sources claim that his unique service earned him medals from both U.S. president Clinton and Russian president Yeltsin at that ceremony in the Rose Garden marking the 50th anniversary of D-Day in 1994. However, this is not reflected in the original presidential transcript, which mentions only medals awarded to other veterans.

== Death and legacy ==
Joe Beyrle's gravesite

Beyrle died in his sleep of heart failure on December 12, 2004, during a visit to Toccoa, Georgia, where he had trained as a paratrooper in 1942. He was 81. He was buried with full military honors in Section 1 of Arlington National Cemetery in April 2005.

Beyrle and his wife JoAnne had a daughter, Julie, and two sons. The elder son, Joe Beyrle II, served in the 101st Airborne during the Vietnam War. His son John Beyrle served as the United States Ambassador to Russia 2008–2012.

On September 17, 2002, a book by Thomas Happer Taylor about Beyrle, The Simple Sounds of Freedom, was published by Random House. A Ballantine paperback version, Behind Hitler's Lines, came out June 1, 2004.

In 2005, a plaque was unveiled on the wall of the church in Saint-Côme-du-Mont, France, where Beyrle landed on June 6, 1944. A permanent plaque was dedicated at the site on July 5, 2014. The street alongside the church was renamed "Rue Joseph Beyrle" at a ceremony held in June 2024.

An exhibition devoted to Joe Beyrle's life and wartime experiences was shown in Moscow and three other Russian cities in 2010. The exhibition opened a four-city American tour at The National World War II Museum in New Orleans, with showings in Toccoa and Omaha in 2011, and Beyrle's hometown of Muskegon in June 2012. A permanent installation of the exhibition is now on display at the USS Silversides Museum in Muskegon.

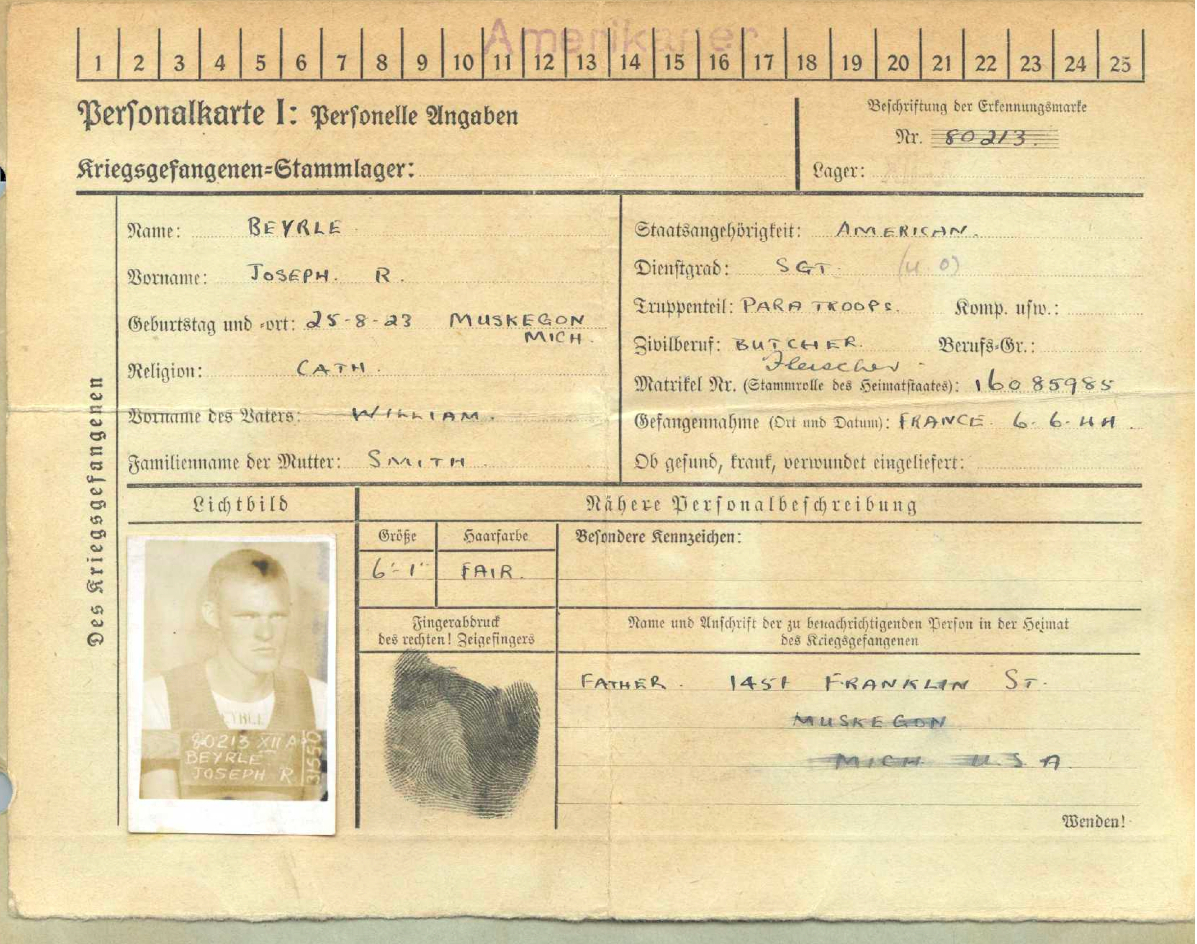
The German record with Beyrle's details as a prisoner of war

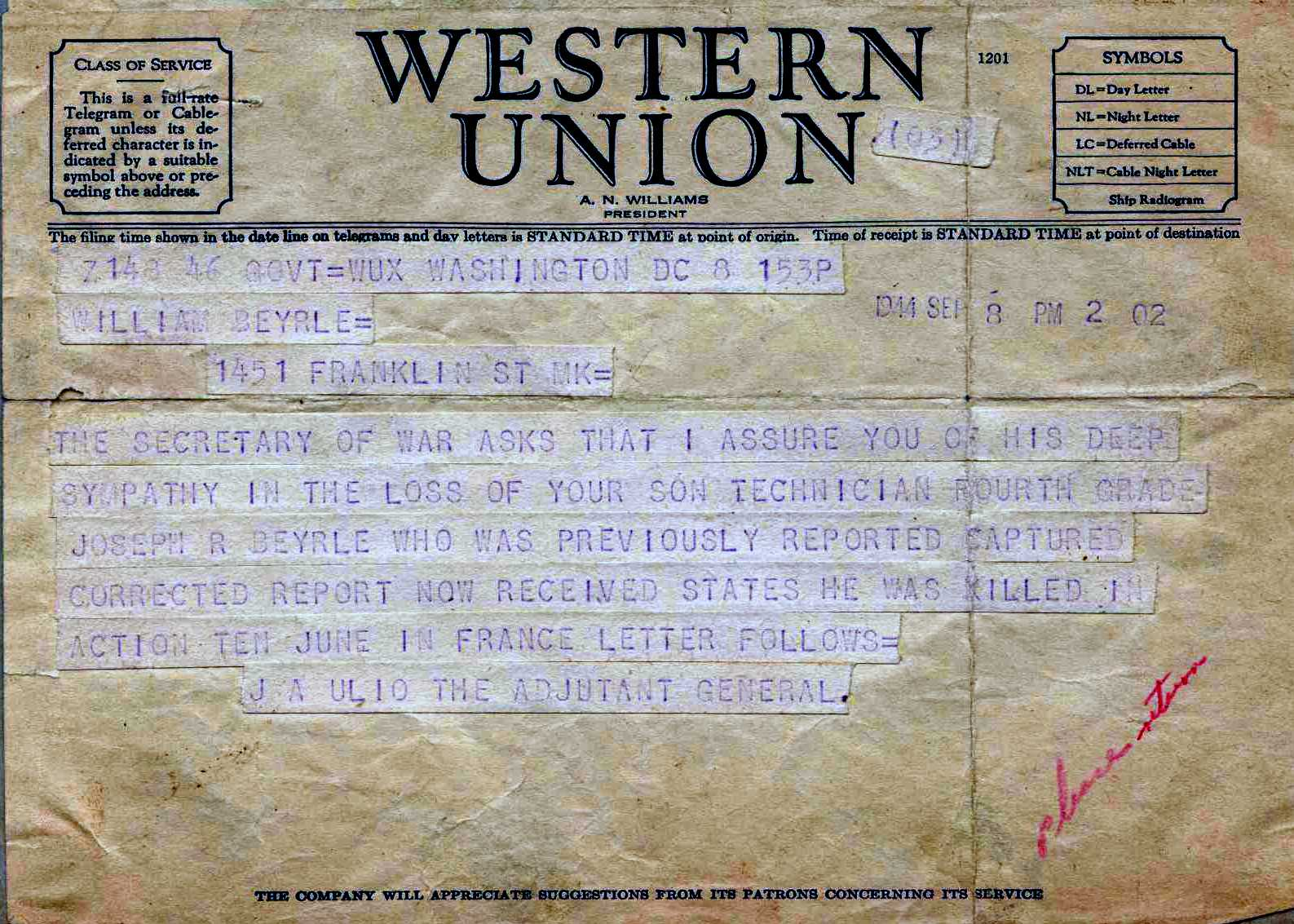
The US War Department telegram sent to Beyrle's family, incorrectly telling them of his death, September 1944

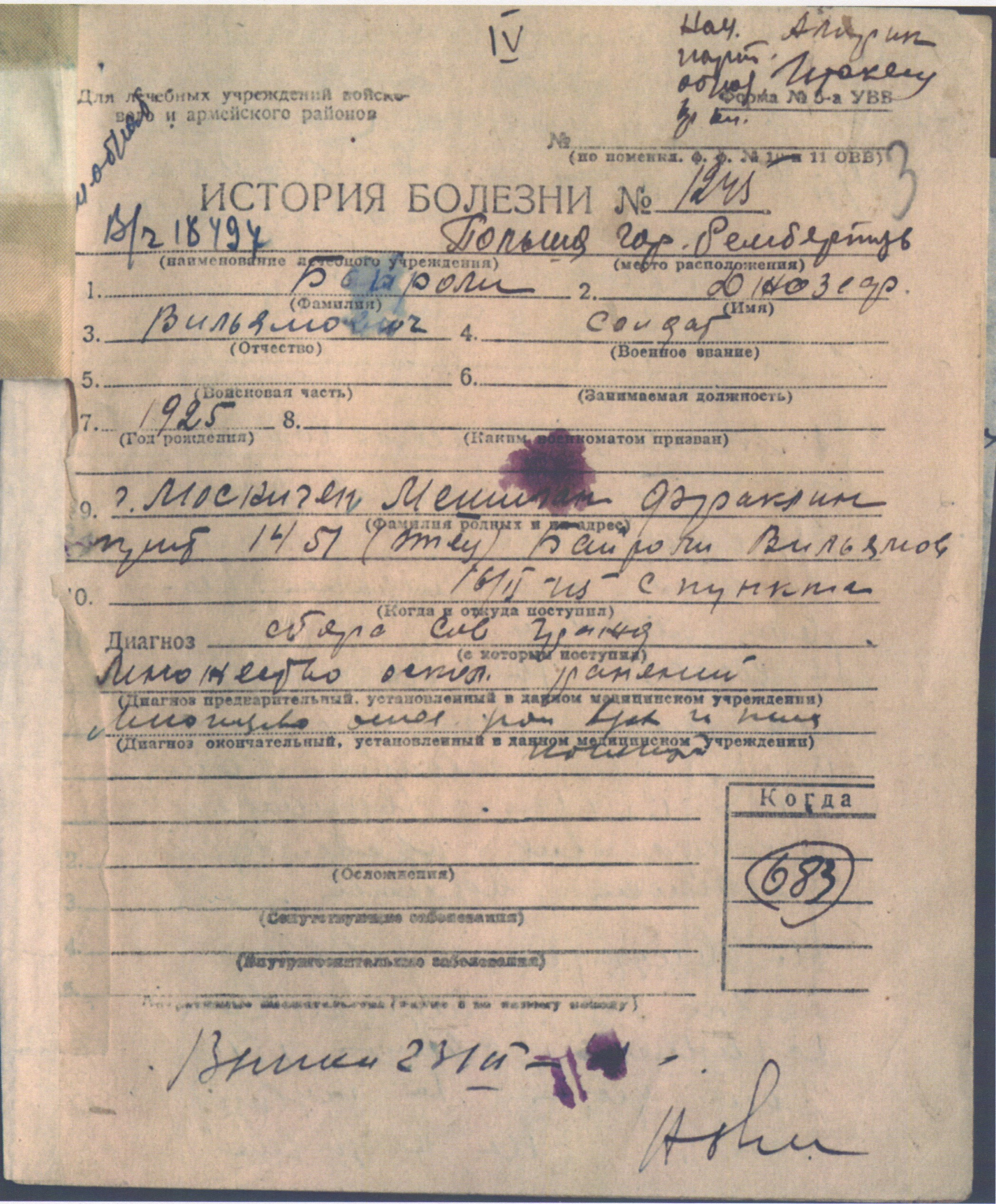
Beyrle's Soviet medical chart detailing his wounds

== Awards and decorations ==
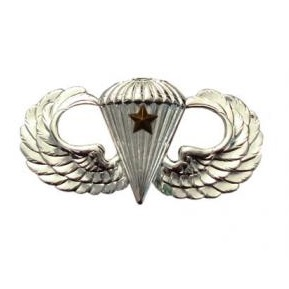
Combat Infantryman Badge
Parachutist Badge with one Combat Jump Star
Bronze Star
Purple Heart with four Oak Leaf Clusters
Prisoner of War Medal
Army Good Conduct Medal
American Campaign Medal
European-African-Middle Eastern Campaign Medal with 2 Service Stars and Arrowhead Device
World War II Victory Medal
Croix de Guerre (France)
Order of the Red Banner
Order of the Red Star
Medal "For the Liberation of Warsaw"
Medal "For the Victory over Germany in the Great Patriotic War 1941–1945"
Medal of Zhukov
Jubilee Medal "50 Years of Victory in the Great Patriotic War 1941–1945"

== See also ==
- Harry Eisman
