= Aleksandra Boiko =

Russian military personnel

- Александра Леонтьевна Бойко
- Born: Alexandra Leontievna Morisheva; 20 May 1918; Belebey, Russia
- Died: 25 May 1996 (aged 78)
- Spouse: Ivan Fedorovich Boiko
- Military career
- Allegiance: Soviet Union
- Branch: Soviet Army
- Service years: 1943–1945
- Rank: Junior Lieutenant
- Conflicts: Eastern Front
- Awards: Order of the Patriotic War, 1st class

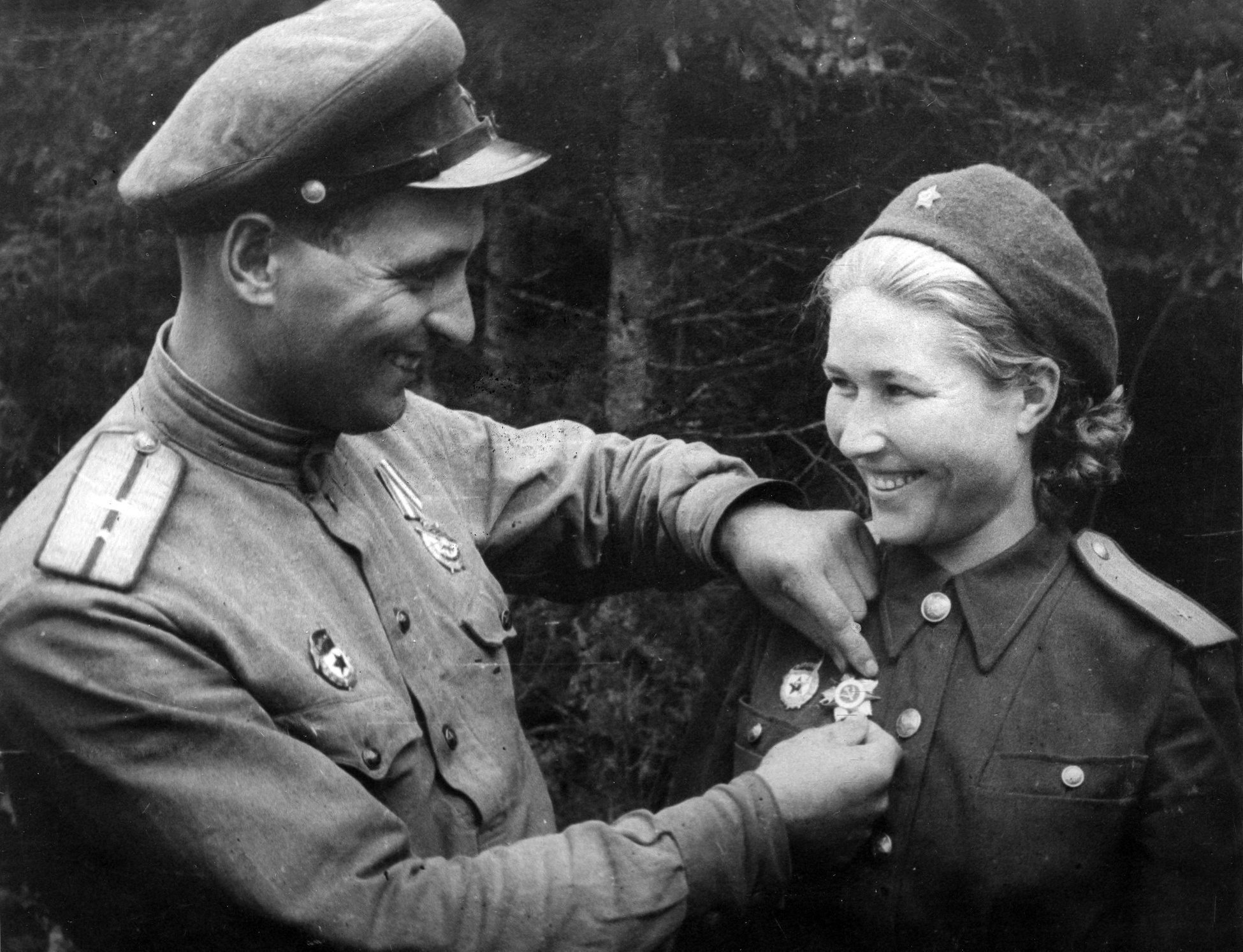
Boiko's husband Ivan pins the Order of the Patriotic War 1st class on her uniform during an awards ceremony, August 1944

Aleksandra Leontievna Boiko (née Morisheva; Russian: Александра Леонтьевна Бойко; 20 May 1918 – 25 May 1996) was a tank commander in the Soviet Army active in the Eastern Front of the Second World War.

== Biography ==
Aleksandra Leontievna Morisheva was born on 20 May 1918, in Belebey, Bashkiria, Russia. She graduated from the Kiev Chemical-Technological Technical College in 1938, and became employed as a chemist in a factory in Bashkortostan. Morisheva moved to Magadan, where she became an inspector in the Kolymsnab trust until February 1942. Morisheva married Ivan Fedorovich Boiko.

Along with her husband, Ivan Boiko, she raised 50,000 roubles from their savings to pay for the construction of a tank for the Soviet Army. As part of the effort, they appealed to be sent to the Eastern Front. A year later, she was appointed as a tank commander while holding the rank of junior lieutenant, and her husband was her engineer within the tank. The couple had both graduated from the accelerated programme at the Chelyabinsk Tank School. They first entered battle during the Riga Offensive in 1944, and it was reported that they had destroyed five tanks and two guns in two weeks. In August that year, she was awarded the Order of the Patriotic War, first class.

She went to Moscow in September that year, where she attended an anti-fascist rally and appeared on the back cover of the magazine Ogoniok. Later, while fighting in the Baltics, both Boikos were injured and spent time in a hospital. They were released in time to celebrate Victory Day in Czechoslovakia.

After she was demobilised, she returned to Magadan and ran a bakery before being elected to the City Council twice, in 1947 and 1953. She then moved to Apsheronsk, but was made an honorary citizen of Magadan on 4 December 1991. She died on 25 May 1996.

== See also ==
- Irina Levchenko
- Mariya Oktyabrskaya
- Aleksandra Samusenko
