= Thomas Happer Taylor =

US Army officer and author

Thomas Happer Taylor (11 December 1934 – 1 October 2017) was a highly decorated veteran of the United States Army, a military historian, an author of seven books, and a champion triathlete.

He served in Vietnam and followed in the footsteps of his father, General Maxwell Taylor.

== Early life ==
Taylor was born in Fort Leavenworth, Kansas, the second son of Lydia Happer and Maxwell Davenport Taylor. His older brother, John Maxwell Taylor (Jack) was born 3 May 1930. Soon after his birth, the family moved to Tokyo, where his father, a fluent Japanese linguist, was military attaché. During World War II, while his father served in North Africa, Taylor and his older brother lived in Fort Bragg, NC, and Arlington, VA, where Mrs. Taylor worked for the Office of Price Administration (OPA) in doling out gasoline ration cards.

After attending high school in Berlin following the Berlin Blockade, Taylor returned to the US, where he graduated from St Albans in Washington, DC He then matriculated to West Point from which he graduated in 1960. His father remarked about Taylor's undergraduate education: "He did something at the Academy that I could never do. He made the choir".

At the time of his death, he was married to the former Pamela Borgfeldt for 49 years.

== Military service ==
After a period in the Special Forces and in the infantry, Taylor volunteered for service in South Vietnam, but was not permitted to begin his tour of duty there until his father Maxwell Taylor completed his service as Ambassador to South Vietnam.

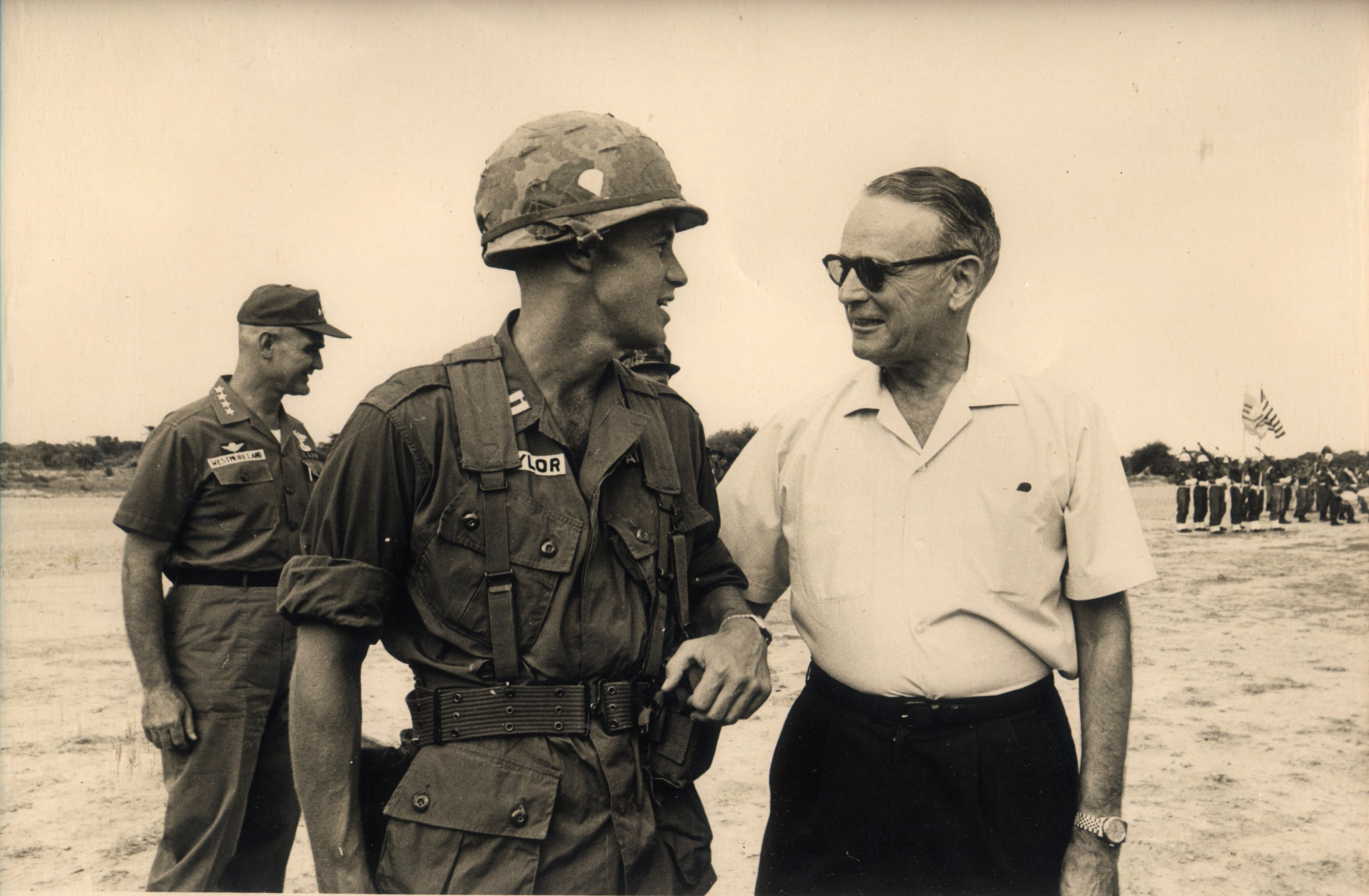
This shot was taken on the day that Thomas Taylor arrived in South Vietnam to begin his service there. On the same day, his father General Maxwell Taylor, left South Vietnam

He arrived in Vietnam as a captain in July 1965, joining the First Brigade of the 101st Airborne Division, (the "Screaming Eagles") which his father had commanded in World War II. Taylor's first assignment was as the intelligence officer of his brigade. His commander had felt that his Special Forces training would be an advantage in combatting guerrillas, and this proved to be true. In September 1965, Taylor participated in the first encounter between a U.S. battalion and a Viet Cong main force battalion. Two company commanders were casualties in that battle, and Taylor inherited B Company, 2nd Battalion, 502nd Parachute Infantry Regiment, called "Strike Force". Although "parachute" was in the group's name, the soldiers used helicopters exclusively. Taylor was awarded the Silver Star, two Bronze Stars for valor and the Purple Heart, the latter involving a wound that ended his command of B Company.

== Literary, academic, and legal achievements ==
After returning to the U.S., Taylor wrote A-18 (Crown Publications, 1967) a novel about a Special Forces raid to kill Hồ Chí Minh. Because he was still in the Army, Taylor was subject to Pentagon censorship. Despite the censors' objection to the author's depiction of sexual seduction, "something unbecoming for an officer to do", A-18 led to a fellowship to the prestigious Bread Loaf Writers Conference in Vermont.

Eager to take on civilian subjects, Taylor decided to study sociology at the University of California, Berkeley. To him, being a Vietnam vet in Berkeley in the 1960s was "like facing the Viet Cong on a second front". As a teaching assistant his classes were disrupted by window shattering rocks thrown by protestors shouting "War criminal!" His classes consequently were moved to upper floors.

In 1970 Taylor wrote A Piece of This Country (W. W. Norton) about a black sergeant who found in Vietnam the respect that he was unable to achieve at home. The book received many positive reviews. Publishers Weekly called it "a powerful novel". Writing in The New York Times, Marin Levin observed, "The Byzantine complexities of the Vietnam war are brilliantly sifted in this stunning history of a siege". The novel, identified by Ken Lopez as one of the 25 best books about the Vietnam War, earned Taylor the George E. Crothers Literary Prize awarded annually by UC Berkeley.

Intermittent employment after graduate school turned Taylor's attention to remunerative prospects in law. Not wishing to rely so much on his wife, Pamela, a Pan Am stewardess, after he earned a master's degree in sociology, Taylor entered the Hastings College of Law at the University of California in San Francisco. He was admitted to the State Bar of California in July, 1978. Graduation led to a legal job with Bechtel, the engineering/construction giant whose best paying jobs were in Saudi Arabia. There, one of the contracts that Taylor negotiated was with the Bin Laden Group, which was building a city from scratch on the Persian Gulf. When five of his colleagues were arrested for consuming alcohol, Taylor had to learn elements of sharia law to handle their case. Meanwhile, he wrote Born of War (McGraw-Hill), a historical novel about Orde Wingate, the controversial British officer who defeated the Italians in Ethiopia and led the famous Chindits in Burma during World War II. Library Journal commented that the book provided "good historical background in a variety of settings" and that it was "smoothly written". Born of War was optioned several times by Hollywood executives but was never produced.

In 1982, Taylor's Vietnam past returned in the person of his Vietnamese interpreter, Ben Cai Lam, whose true story of imprisonment and escape rivaled that of Dr. Haing S. Ngor, protagonist of The Killing Fields. Taylor told the story of Ben Cai Lam in his first nonfiction book, Where the Orange Blooms (McGraw-Hill, 1989). The Kirkus Review noted that when Taylor "focuses on his own experiences and on the larger issue of what went wrong in Vietnam, he is invariably engrossing". Taylor had continued his military service as a member of the United States Army Reserve, and he retired as a colonel in 1991.

Where the Orange Blooms was followed by a second nonfiction book, Lightning in the Storm (Hippocrene), the story of the 101st Airborne Division's role in the Gulf War. "The division operated some distance from where I worked in Saudi Arabia. That seemed so ironic". Booklist observed that the book "is a good narrative that mixes the anecdotal and the analytical without unreasonably exaggerating the division's contribution to the coalition victory and that is written to be accessible to a broad range of readers. Taylor, who has written the book as a tribute to noncommissioned officers in particular, has the triple qualifications of being a writer, a veteran of the division, and the son of the late Maxwell Taylor, the division's commander during World War II". Now a well-known military historian, Taylor was commissioned by the US Army Ranger Association to write Rangers Lead the Way (Turner Publishing, 1996).

His next project was "The Simple Sounds of Freedom" (Random House, 2002), based on the life of Joe Beyrle, the only American to have fought and been wounded in both the American and Russian armies. The book's title was borrowed from President Clinton's address on the 50th Anniversary of D-Day at the American Cemetery in Normandy: "These are the men who gave us our world. The simple sounds of freedom we hear today are their voices speaking to us across the years". The Library Journal commented: "This is the riveting story of Joe Beyrle's amazing World War II odyssey.... Taylor skillfully intermixes Joe's ordeal with the 101st's battles against the Germans, from D-day to Bastogne. He has carefully corroborated the details of Joe's adventures with other POWs and available documents. Fortunately, Beyrle is still alive to enjoy the recognition his unbounded courage deserves. This book belongs in all World War II collections". Booklist (12 August 2002) noted that Taylor "relates an incredible odyssey of Beyrle's escape attempts, survival in several POW camps, and ultimate escape to the advancing Russians, with whom he volunteered to fight and was subsequently wounded. Despite the presentation's compositional bumpiness, it carries Beyrle's courageous war mettle directly to the avid audience for stories concerning the legendary 101st".

== Triathletic achievements ==
In the 1960s, while he was enrolled at West Point, Taylor had been the captain of the school's Modern Pentathlon team. Competition involved five activities: running, swimming, pistol marksmanship, fencing, and horsemanship. The sport prepared Taylor two decades later for the triathlon, which consists of running, swimming, and biking. While writing for the recently founded Triathlete magazine, Taylor decided his articles would have greater authenticity if he attempted the sport himself. That led in 1982 to winning the US National Champion in his age group, a feat that he repeated in 1985.

His next championship came a quarter century later, with his victory in the 75–79 age category. Owing to his Purple Heart (which Taylor wore on his racing shirt), he was named to be the American flag bearer for Team USA in the World Championships at Gold Coast, Australia, and at Budapest, where he finished fifth. "I wore mine for soldiers earning Purple Hearts in Iraq and Afghanistan. My wound was minor. Many of theirs are mind-numbing".

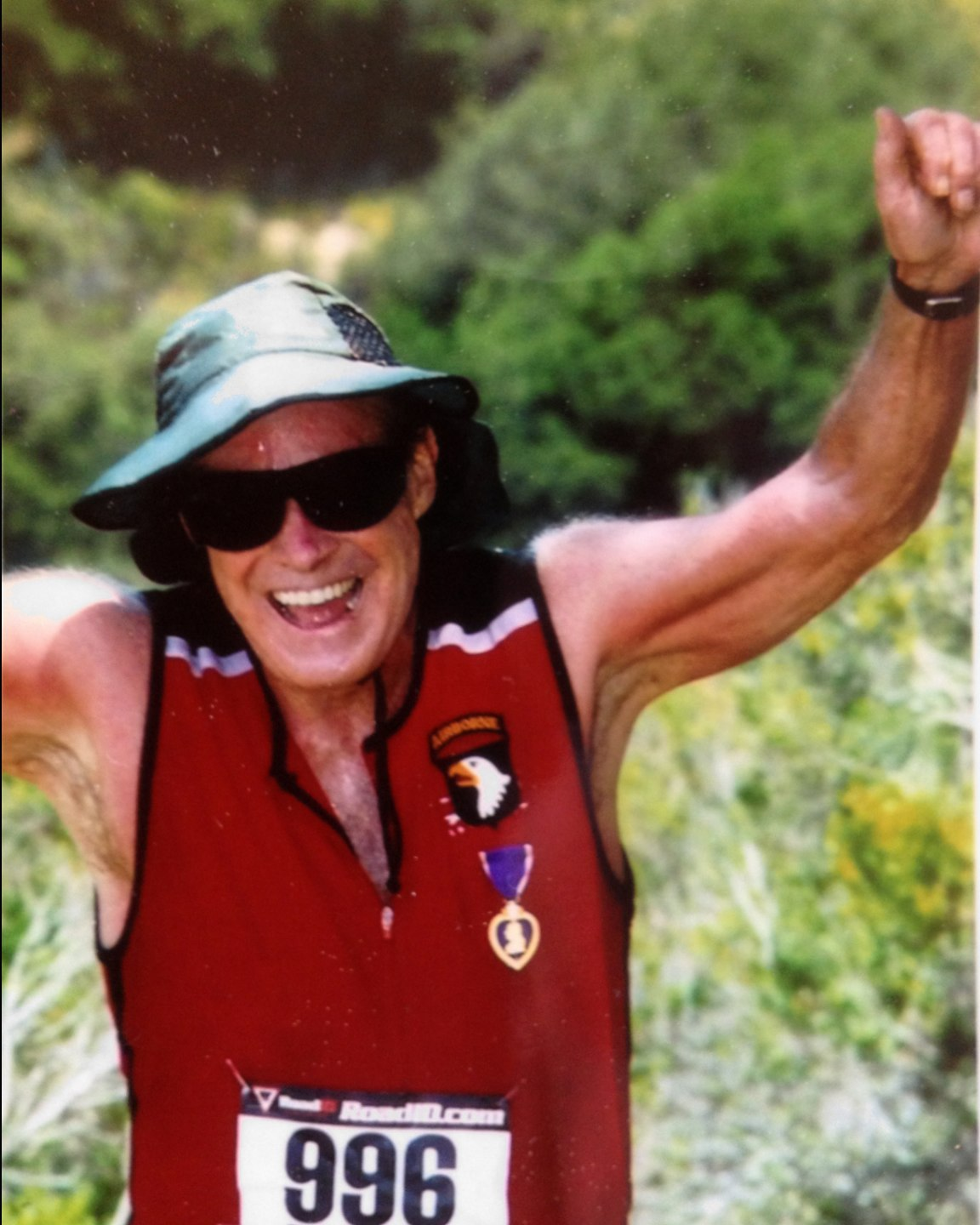
Tom Taylor completes a triathlon wearing his Purple Heart.
