= Kaspar von Barth =

German philologist (1587–1658)

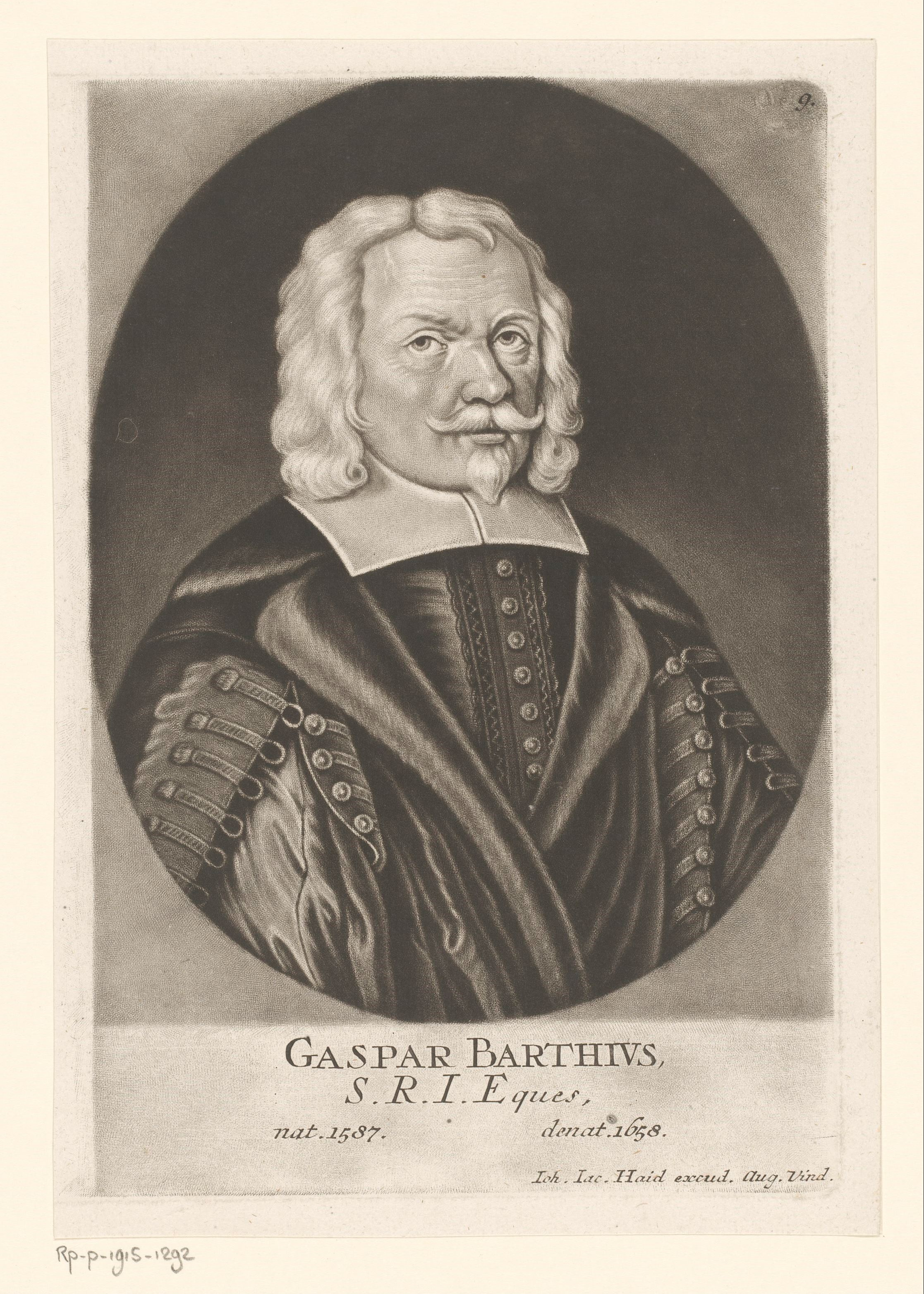
- Born: 21 June 1587; Küstrin, Germany (today Poland)
- Died: 17 September 1658 (aged 71)
- Occupations: Philologist and writer

Kaspar von Barth (21 June 1587 – 17 September 1658) was a German philologist and writer.

== Biography ==
Barth was born at Küstrin (today Kostrzyn in Poland) in the Neumark region of Brandenburg. A precocious child, he was looked upon as a marvel of learning. After studying at Gotha, Eisenach, Wittenberg, and Jena, he travelled extensively, visiting most of the countries of Europe. Too independent to accept any regular post, he lived alternately at Halle and on his property at Sellerhausen in Leipzig.

Because his library and manuscripts were destroyed by a fire at Sellerhausen, Barth moved to the Paulinum at Leipzig, where he died. Barth was a voluminous writer. Regarding Barth and his output, 1911 Encyclopædia Britannica gives the following judgment: "his works, which were the fruits of extensive reading and a retentive memory, are unmethodical and uncritical and marred by want of taste and of clearness. He appears to have been excessively vain and of an unamiable disposition."

== Main works ==
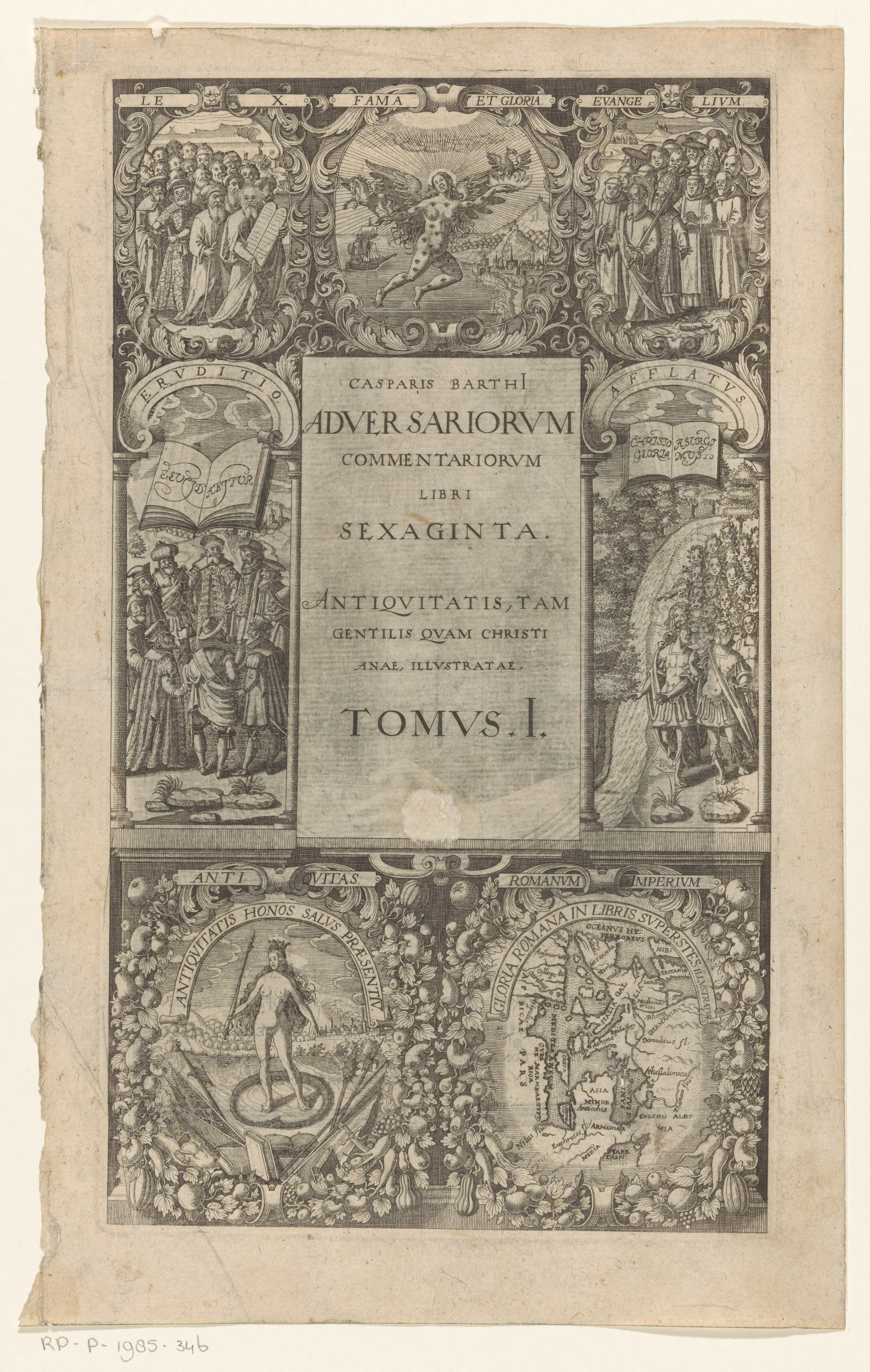
Caspar von Barth Adversariorum commentariorum libri LX. Vol. 1. Frankfurt, 1624

- Adversariorum Commentariorum in 60 books (Frankfurt 1624, reprinted in 1658), a storehouse of miscellaneous learning, dealing not only with classical but also with medieval and modern writers
- commentaries on Claudian (1650)
- commentaries on Statius (published posthumously at Zwickau in 1664 under the direction of his friend Christian Daum).

In addition, another work can be noted:

- Caspar Barthen Deutscher Phoenix (Caspar Barthen German Phoenix, 1626)
