= Irina Levchenko =

Soviet writer and military officer

Irina Nikolaevna Levchenko
- Ирина Николаевна Левченко
- Born: 15 March 1924; Kadiivka, Ukrainian SSR, Soviet Union
- Died: 18 January 1973 (aged 48); Moscow, Russia SFSR, Soviet Union
- Burial place: Novodevichy Cemetery
- Military career
- Allegiance: Soviet Union
- Branch: Red Army
- Service years: 1941–1958
- Rank: Lieutenant colonel
- Conflicts: World War II
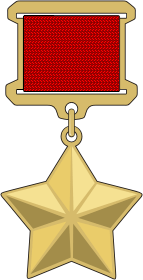
- Awards: (25 October 1943) Hero of the Soviet Union; Florence Nightingale Medal

Irina Nikolaevna Levchenko (Russian: Ирина Николаевна Левченко; Ukrainian: Ірина Миколаївна Левченко; 15 March 1924 – 8 January 1973) was a combat medic turned tank commander in the Red Army during World War II who was awarded the title Hero of the Soviet Union in 1965; she was also the first Soviet woman awarded the Florence Nightingale Medal.

== Early life ==
Levchenko was born in Kadiivka on 15 March 1924 to a Russian family. Raised in Artyomovsk, she went on to graduate from her ninth grade of school in Moscow in 1941. Previously, her father Nikolai Levchenko, an electrician by trade, had held been the Deputy People's Commissar of Railways in the country, but he was arrested as part of the Great Purge on 30 November 1937 and eventually executed in April 1938. Her grandmother Mariya Zubkova-Saraeva was a recipient of the Order of the Red Banner for service during the Russian Civil War.

== World War II ==
After the German invasion of the Soviet Union, Levchenko went to a local Red Cross facility and requested work to help the war effort. Initially given work away from the frontlines, she decided to join the military in July 1941 so that she could help wounded soldiers on the warfront. Initially assigned to the 222nd Separate Medical Battalion, she soon transferred to become a nurse <Повесть о военных годах. // журнал «Знамя». — 1952. — № 11—12.><Повесть о военных годах. Рассказы. — М.: Московский рабочий, 1961> on the 744th Infantry Regiment, with which she saw combat during the battle for Smolensk. After being wounded on 15 October she was shell-shocked and remained hospitalized until December. Subsequently, she briefly served in the 176th Separate Tank Battalion before moving on to the 1st Battalion of the 39th Tank Brigade in January 1942; there, she learned to load the gun of a T-60 tank in addition to her medic duties, having developed an interest in tanks. From then until March she served in Crimea, aiding dozens of wounded soldiers during the battle for Kerch in addition to taking an enemy soldier prisoner and bringing him to her unit. On 26 March she was badly wounded in combat, leaving her hospitalized in Krasnodar until May. As a nurse in the war she rescued and aided 168 soldiers.

While the medical commission wanted to have her demobilized after she recovered, she insisted in staying with tank forces and wanted to attend tank school. After much bureaucratic delay was able to secure a meeting with General Yakov Fedorenko, who initially refused to support her endeavor but eventually agreed to give her permission to attend tank school if she received a medical certificate indicating her to be fit. Despite injuries from battle having given her the status of invalid second class and nearly led to amputation of her right arm, she successfully persuaded a medical officer to issue such certificate, and in July 1942 she enrolled in the Stalingrad Tank School, which was relocated to Kurgan in the Urals due to the ongoing battle for the Stalingrad at the time. There, she trained for twelve hours a day, ignoring the pain in her right arm when she shifted gears. After graduating from the school in March 1943 she became an assistant chief of staff in the 449th Tank Battalion, where she helped prepare new tanks to be sent to the frontlines. In September she briefly served as a liaison officer in the 33rd Army, but was wounded that month during the battle for Smolensk before waking up in a Moscow hospital to learn that the Red Army retook the city. From October that year until April 1944 she served as an adjutant in the directorate of combat training for tank forces, after which she became a liaison officer for the headquarters of the 3rd Tank Brigade. There, she saw combat in Moldova, and was wounded in battle on 12 May 1944. Upon recovery in an Odessa hospital in July she returned to the frontlines as a liaison officer in the 41st Guards Tank Brigade. There, she participated in the offensives for major cities in Moldova, Bulgaria, and Hungary until being wounded for a fifth time in the war on 14 December 1944. Due to the severity of the injury, she was kept away from the military until recovering in February 1945, after which she was redeployed as a liaison officer in the 8th Mechanized Corps to participate in the East Pomeranian and Berlin operations.

== Postwar ==
Remaining in the military after the end of the war, at the suggestion of Pavel Rotmistrov she attended the Military Academy of Armored and Mechanized Forces, which she graduated from in 1952 with an engineering degree. She then served as the military representative at a factory in Mytishchi until October 1953, and after graduating from history studies at the Frunze Military Academy in 1955 she became a researcher for the Voennaya mysl (“Military Thought”) magazine. Having retired from active duty with the rank of lieutenant colonel in 1958, she continued her writing career as a member of the Writer’s Union of the USSR. In 1959 she married poet Yevgeny Dolmatovsky, and the next year she gave birth to their daughter Olga. In February 1966 she went to North Vietnam, where she met with leaders including Ho Chi Minh and forces on the frontlines fighting off American attacks, which later inspired her 1967 book Дочери Вьетнама (English: Daughters of Vietnam). She lived in Moscow, where she died on 18 January 1973 and was buried in the Novodevichy cemetery.

== Awards ==
- Hero of the Soviet Union (6 May 1965)
- Order of Lenin (6 May 1965)
- Three Order of the Red Star (7 September 1944, 20 May 1945, 30 December 1956)
- Medal "For Military Merit" (19 November 1951)
- Florence Nightingale Medal (12 May 1961)
- campaign and jubilee medals

== See also ==
- List of female Heroes of the Soviet Union
- Aleksandra Samusenko
- Mariya Oktyabrskaya
- Aleksandra Boiko
