= Mariya Oktyabrskaya =

Soviet war hero (1905–1944)

Mariya Vasilyevna Oktyabrskaya
- Мария Васильевна Октябрьская
- Born: 16 August 1905; Kiat, Taurida Governorate, Russian Empire
- Died: 15 March 1944 (aged 38); Smolensk, Russian SSR, Soviet Union
- Spouse: Ilya Oktyabrsky (m. 1925; died 1941)
- Military career
- Allegiance: Soviet Union
- Branch: Red Army
- Service years: 1943–1944
- Rank: Sergeant of the Soviet Army
- Unit: 26th Guards Tank Brigade (2nd Guards Tank Corps)
- Conflicts: World War II; Eastern Front †
- Awards: Hero of the Soviet Union

Mariya Vasilyevna Oktyabrskaya (Russian: Мария Васильевна Октябрьская; 16 August 1905 – 15 March 1944) was a Soviet tank driver and mechanic who fought on the Eastern Front against Nazi Germany during World War II. After her husband was killed fighting in 1941, Oktyabrskaya sold her possessions to donate a tank for the war effort, and requested that she be allowed to drive it. She received and was trained to drive and fix a T-34 medium tank, which she named "Fighting Girlfriend" ("Боевая подруга"). Oktyabrskaya proved her ability and bravery in battle, and was promoted to the rank of sergeant. After she died of wounds from battle in 1944, she was posthumously made a Hero of the Soviet Union, the Soviet Union's highest honor for bravery during combat. She was the first female tank driver to be awarded the title.

== Early life ==
Oktyabrskaya was born into a poor Ukrainian family on the Crimean Peninsula. She was one of ten children. Before the Second World War, she worked in a cannery, and then as a telephone operator. In 1925, she married a Soviet army officer named Ilya Oktyabrsky. She then began to acquire an interest in military matters. She became involved in the 'Military Wives Council' and was trained as a nurse in the army. She also learned how to use weapons and drive vehicles. She said, "Marry a serviceman, and you serve in the army: an officer's wife is not only a proud woman, but also a responsible title."

== Second World War ==
When the eastern front of World War II opened, Mariya was evacuated to Tomsk in Siberia. While living in Tomsk, she learned that her husband had been killed fighting the forces of Nazi Germany near Kiev in August 1941. The news took two years to reach her. The news angered her greatly, and she became determined to fight the Germans to avenge her husband's death. She sold all of her possessions to donate a tank to the Red Army. She requested the tank, a T-34 medium tank, be named "Fighting Girlfriend" ("Боевая подруга") and that she be allowed to drive it. The State Defense Committee agreed to this.

By this time, Oktyabrskaya was 38 years old. She enrolled in a five-month tank training program immediately after the donation. After completing her training, she was posted to the 26th Guards Tank Brigade, part of the 2nd Guards Tank Corps, in September 1943 as a driver and mechanic. She named her tank "Fighting Girlfriend", emblazoning these words on the turret of the T-34. Many of her fellow tankers saw her as a publicity stunt and a joke, but this attitude changed when Oktyabrskaya began fighting in Smolensk.

=== Combat ===
She fought in her first tank battle on 21 October 1943. Oktyabrskaya maneuvered her tank in intense fighting; she and her fellow crew members destroyed machine-gun nests and artillery guns. When her tank was hit by gunfire, Oktyabrskaya, disregarding orders, leapt out of her tank and effected repairs under heavy fire. She was promoted to the rank of sergeant.

A month later, on 17–18 November, Soviet forces captured the town of Novoye Selo in the region of Vitebsk during a night battle. During this attack, Oktyabrskaya grew her reputation as a skilled tank driver. On 17 November, Oktyabrskaya took part in an assault on the German positions near Novoye Selo. However, a German artillery shell exploded against her tank's tracks, halting her advance. Oktyabrskaya and a fellow crewman jumped out to repair the track, while other crew members provided covering fire from the turret. Eventually, they fixed the track and her tank rejoined the main unit several days later.

Two months later, on 17 January 1944, Oktyabrskaya fought in another night attack. The battle would prove to be her last. The attack took place at the village of Krynki near Vitebsk. During the battle, she drove her T-34 about the German defenses, and destroyed resistance in trenches and machine-gun nests. The tank crew also destroyed a German self-propelled gun. Subsequently, the tank was hit by a German anti-tank shell, again in the tracks, and was immobilized. Oktyabrskaya immediately got out of the tank and began to repair the track, amid fierce small arms and artillery fire. She managed to repair the track, but she was hit in the head by shell fragments and lost consciousness. After the battle, she was transported to a Soviet military field hospital at Fastiv, near Kiev, and then to a military hospital in Smolensk, Russia. She remained in a coma for two months before succumbing to her injuries on 15 March 1944. She was buried with military honors at the Heroes Remembrance Gardens in Smolensk.

The following August, Oktyabrskaya was posthumously made a Hero of the Soviet Union in recognition of her bravery in the battles around Vitebsk.

== Representations in media ==
In 2014 US National Public Radio featured a cartoon of Oktyabrskaya to headline a story about "rejected princesses" that Disney and other storytellers had hitherto ignored.

== See also ==
- List of female Heroes of the Soviet Union
- Aleksandra Samusenko – Soviet tank commander and liaison officer (1922–1945)
- Irina Levchenko – Soviet writer and military officer
- Aleksandra Boiko – Russian military personnel

== Bibliography ==
- Simonov, Andrey; Chudinova, Svetlana (2017). Женщины – Герои Советского Союза и России. Moscow: Russian Knights Foundation and Museum of Technology Vadim Zadorozhny. ISBN 9785990960701. OCLC 1019634607.
