= Fabian Garin =

Russian Soviet writer (1895–1990)

Fabian Abramovich Garin (1895–1990) was a Soviet writer and World War II veteran.

== Biography ==
He had graduated from the Kyiv Polytechnic Institute in 1924, but lived and worked in Moscow. Among his works are documentary and belletristic books Towards the Pole (1937), The Expulsion of Napoleon (1948), Vasily Blücher (1963–67) and The Flowers on Tanks (1963).

Participant of the Second World War. He served in the editorial office of the newspaper "For the Defeat of the Enemy" of the 29th Army. In 1942, he was contused. He participated in the Kaliningrad defensive and offensive, Rzhevsko-Vyazemsky and Rzhevsko-Sychevsky operations. Since 1943, he was a special correspondent for the newspaper in the 8th Guards Mechanized Corps. He took part in the Demyansk operation, the Battle of Kursk, the Belgorod-Kharkiv, Kyiv Defensive, Zhytomyr-Berdychiv, Korsun-Shevchenkivsk, Proskuriv-Chernivtsi, Lviv-Sandomyr, Warsaw-Poznan, East Pomeranian and Berlin operations. On July 15, 1944, he was wounded. He finished the war with the rank of Guards Major.
