= John Beyrle =

American diplomat

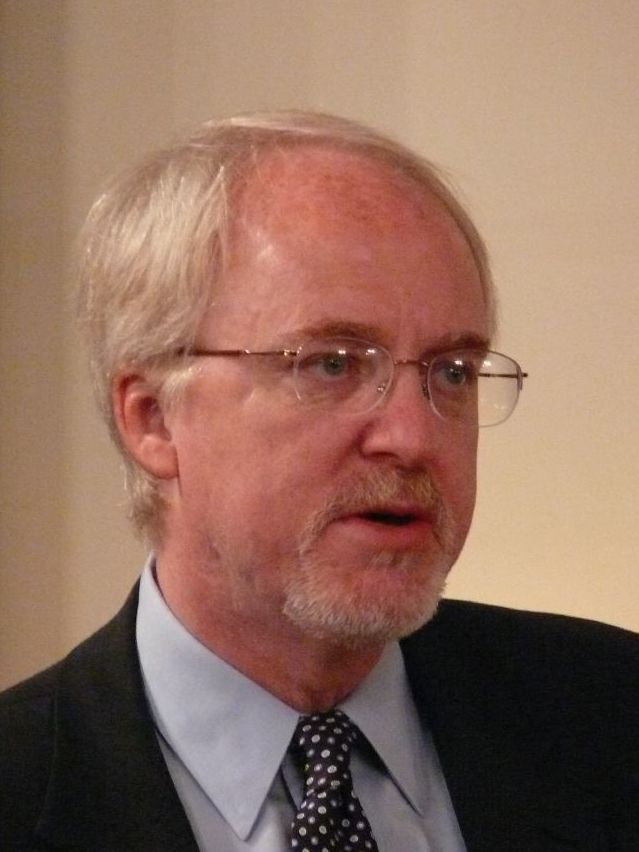

United States Ambassador to Russia
- In office July 2, 2008 – January 10, 2012
- President: George W. Bush; Barack Obama
- Preceded by: William J. Burns
- Succeeded by: Michael McFaul

United States Ambassador to Bulgaria
- In office July 9, 2005 – April 28, 2008
- President: George W. Bush
- Preceded by: James W. Pardew
- Succeeded by: Nancy McEldowney

Personal details
- Born: John Ross Beyrle; February 11, 1954 (age 72) Muskegon, Michigan, U.S.
- Profession: Diplomat

John Ross Beyrle (born February 11, 1954) is an American diplomat. A career Foreign Service Officer and specialist in Russian and Eastern European affairs, he served as Ambassador of the United States to the Russian Federation from July 3, 2008, until January 10, 2012, and as Ambassador to Bulgaria from 2005 to 2008.

Beyrle was Ambassador in Moscow during the "reset" of Russian-American relationship, which saw the signing of the New START arms control treaty, agreement on peaceful uses of nuclear energy, Russia's accession to the World Trade Organization, and liberalized visa formalities for American and Russian travelers.

He retired from the State Department in July 2012 with the rank of Career Minister, the diplomatic equivalent of a three-star general. He serves on the Board of Directors of several non-profit foundations, including as Chairman of the U.S. Russia Foundation, and as an adviser and business consultant on Central and Eastern Europe, Russia, and other countries of the former Soviet Union.

== Biography ==
Beyrle was born on February 11, 1954, in Muskegon, Michigan. His father, Joseph Beyrle, a decorated World War II veteran, was one of the few American G.I.s to serve with both the United States Army and the Red Army.

Beyrle received his bachelor's degree with honors from Grand Valley State University, and a Master of Science degree as a Distinguished Graduate of the National War College. Beyrle completed additional language study in Russian at the University of Michigan and Middlebury College.

He joined the State Department in 1983, served his first tour as a political and consular officer at the U.S. Embassy in Moscow (1983–1985), and later was Deputy Chief of Mission in Moscow (2002–2005). His other overseas assignments included political officer in Bulgaria (1985–1987), Counselor for political and economic affairs at the U.S. Embassy in Prague (1997–1999); and member of the U.S. delegation to the Conventional Forces in Europe negotiations in Vienna (1990–1993). His Washington assignments included Acting Special Advisor to Secretary of State Colin Powell for the New Independent States; Director for Russian, Ukrainian and Eurasian Affairs at the National Security Council (1993–1995); staff officer to Secretaries of State George Shultz and James Baker; and foreign policy adviser to U.S. Senator Paul Simon.

Beyrle's archives are held at the Wende Museum.

== Ambassador to Bulgaria (2005–2008) ==
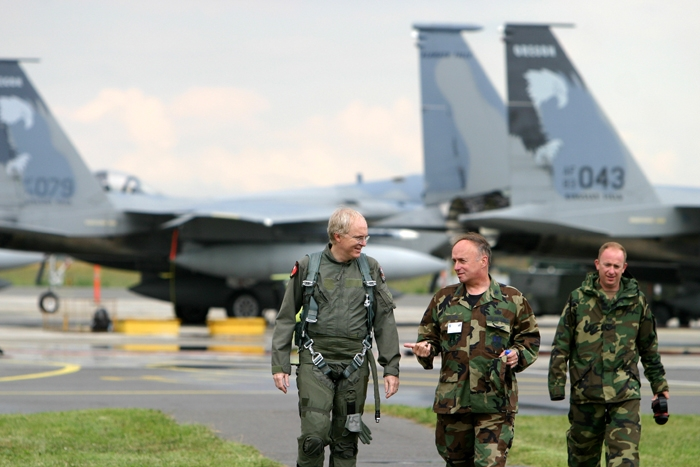
Ambassador Beyrle flew as a passenger on an F-16 during a joint Bulgarian-American training mission at Graf Ignatiev Airbase, 2006.

Beyrle served as Ambassador to Bulgaria from 2005 to 2008. During his term as ambassador, Bulgaria signed a Defense Cooperation Agreement with the United States allowing U.S. soldiers to train at Bulgarian bases (see article on Bulgarian-American relations). He also oversaw the end of U.S. assistance to Bulgaria from the United States Agency for International Development (USAID), and made several public speeches urging the Bulgarian Government to step up its fight against organized crime and corruption. The Bulgarian press was generally favorable toward Ambassador Beyrle, due in large part to his ability to speak and give interviews in Bulgarian. The daily newspaper Standart commented: "for the first time he explained in fluent Bulgarian why the United States is concerned about organized crime and corruption in Bulgaria." In 2008, Bulgarian President Georgi Parvanov presented him with the Order of Stara Planina, the highest award of the Bulgarian Government, for his contributions to Bulgarian-American relations.

== Ambassador to the Russian Federation (2008–2012) ==
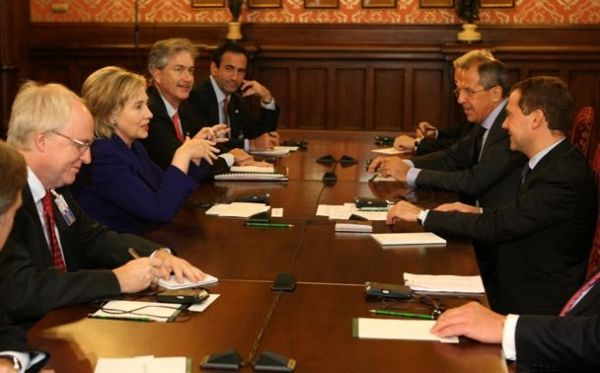
Ambassador Beyrle with Secretary of State Hillary Clinton and Under Secretary of State William J. Burns (left) and Russian President Dmitry Medvedev and Foreign Minister Sergey Lavrov (right) October 13, 2009.

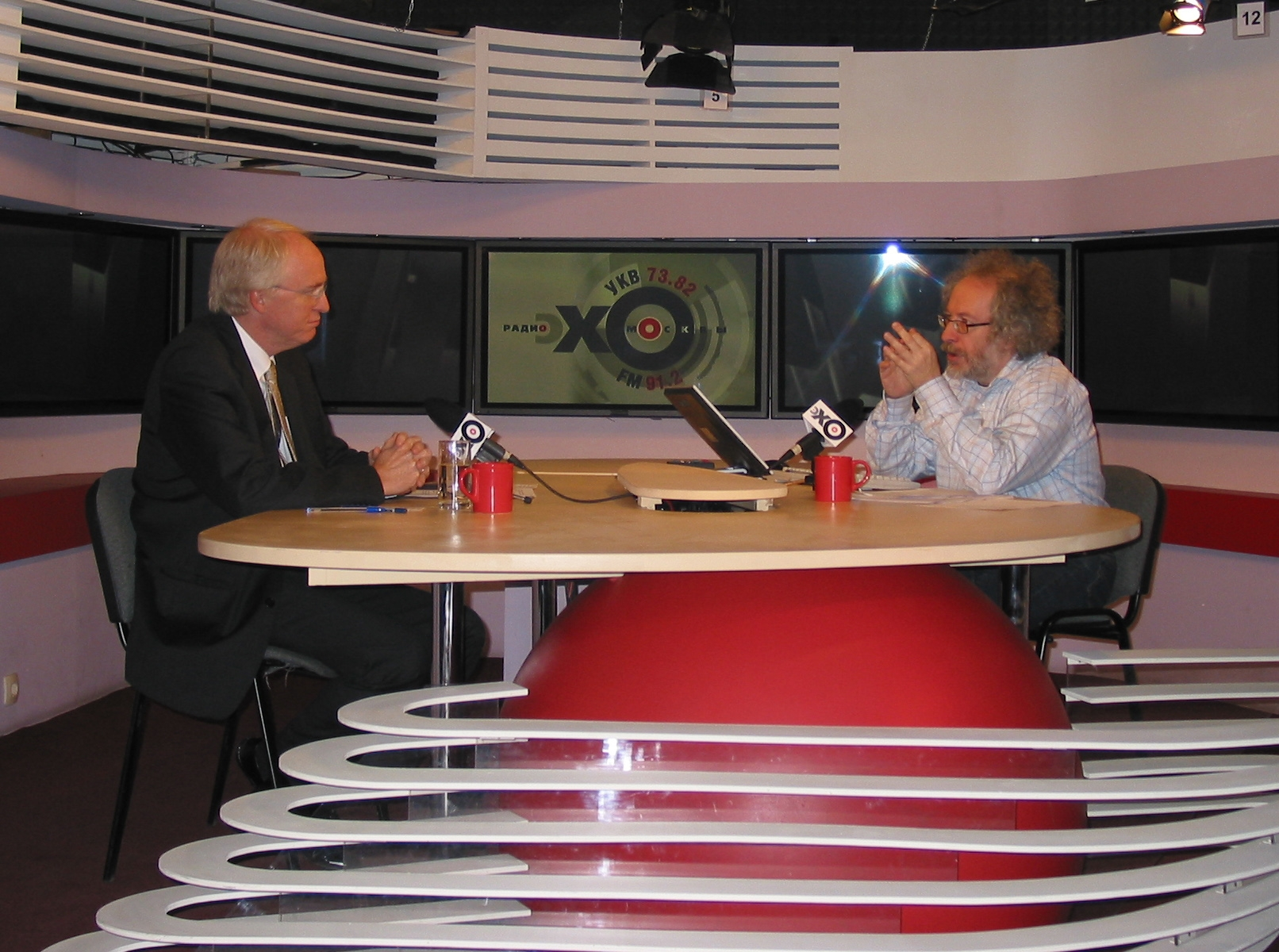
Ambassador Beyrle interviewed on Ekho Moskvy Radio, September 11, 2008.

Ambassador Beyrle was nominated by President George W. Bush on May 13, 2008, to be the United States Ambassador to the Russian Federation, and was confirmed by the U.S. Senate on June 27. One month after his arrival in Moscow, Russia and Georgia fought the brief 2008 South Ossetia War. On September 11 in an interview on the Russian radio station Ekho Moskvy he noted that the United States had warned the Georgian government not to respond to provocations and not to send troops into South Ossetia, and he criticized the Russian actions in Georgia, particularly the rapid recognition of South Ossetia and Abkhazia.

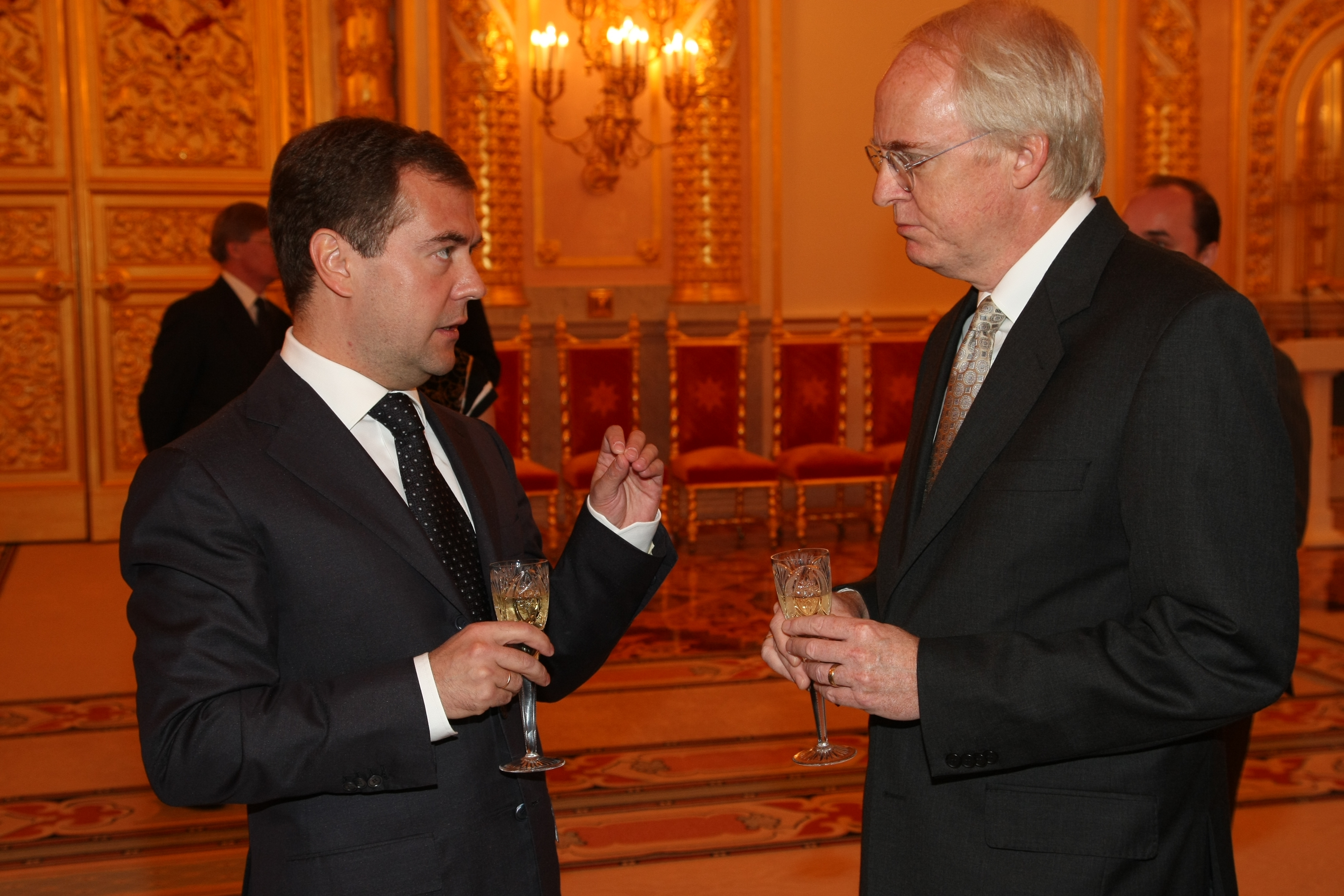
Ambassador Beyrle with Russian President Dmitry Medvedev, after the Ambassador presented his credentials (September 18, 2008).

After the election of President Barack Obama in November 2008, Beyrle took an active part in the new administration's efforts to "reset" the Russian-American relationship. He helped organize and took part in the state visit of President Obama to Moscow in July 2009, and the reciprocal visit by President Medvedev to Washington and California in 2010. He gave frequent media interviews and speeches in Russian to explain America's desire for better relations, including to university audiences in Vladivostok, St. Petersburg, Nizhniy-Novgorod and Sochi.

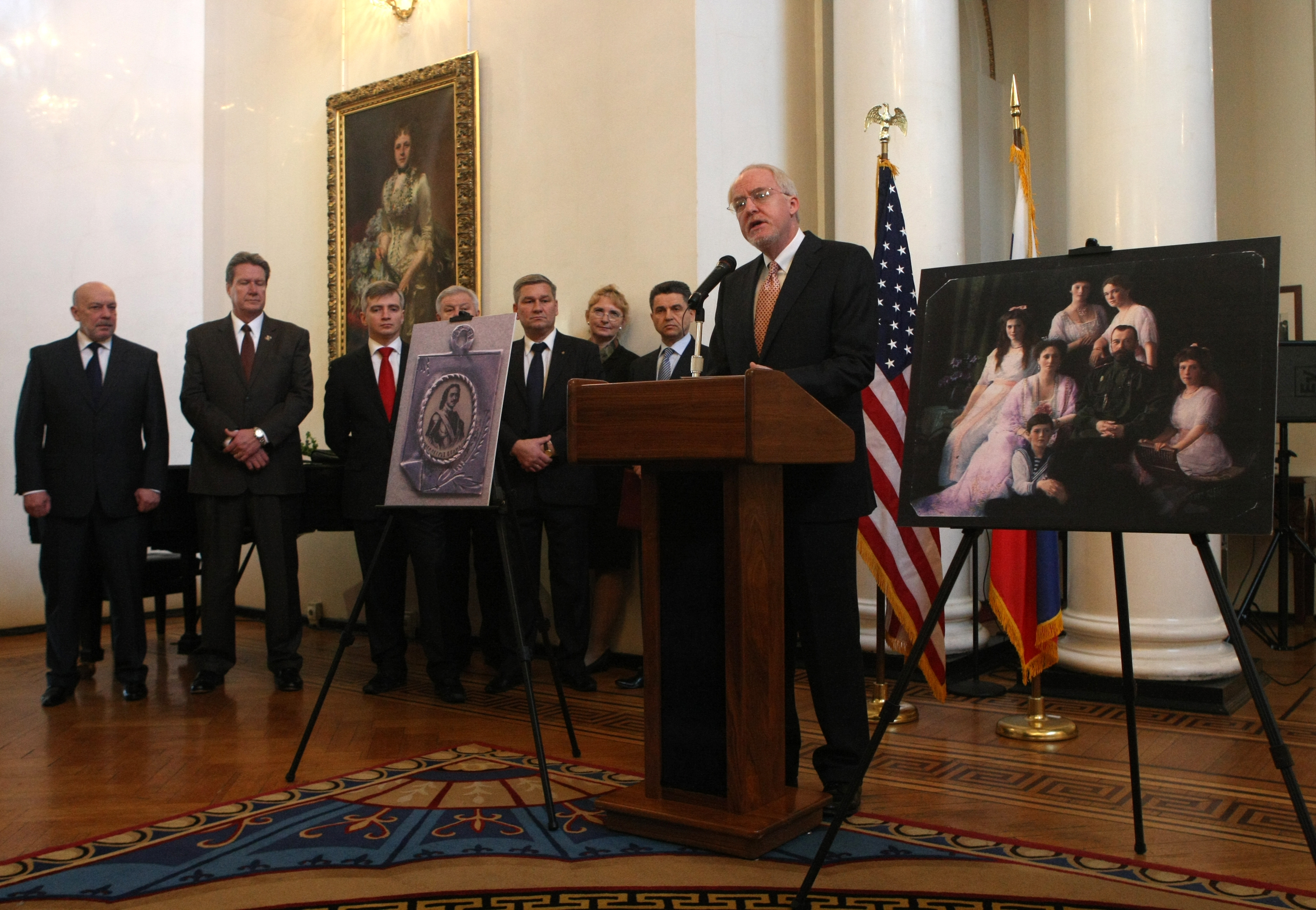
Ambassador Beyrle returns a Czarist medallion stolen from the Hermitage and recovered by a joint operation of U.S. Customs and Russian law enforcement.

On U.S. Veterans Day in 2009, Ambassador Beyrle invited a large number of Russian World War II veterans to his residence, Spaso House, to highlight the wartime alliance between the United States and the Soviet Union. He presided over the return to Russia of a medallion belonging to Czar Nicholas II, which had been stolen from the Hermitage Museum in the 1990s and recovered by a joint operation of the Russian Ministry of Culture and Russian Prosecutor's office and the U.S. Immigration and Customs Enforcement.

Beyrle was the first American Ambassador to Russia to use social media, in Russian, to speak directly to the Russian internet audience. On March 30, the day after the bombing in the Moscow Metro which killed thirty nine people, Beyrle laid flowers at the site of the bombing and used his blog to express his condolences.

On October 29, 2010, Ambassador Beyrle celebrated the connections between American and Russian literature and culture by hosting an Enchanted Ball at Spaso House. The ball recalled the Spring Ball of 1935 held by Ambassador William Christian Bullitt, when the house was decorated with live birds, a birch forest, and a real bear. One of the guests at the 1935 ball was writer Mikhail Bulgakov, who used elements of that ball as an inspiration for Woland's Ball in his novel Master and Margarita.

During the tour of Ambassador Beyrle in Moscow, there was a notable improvement in the tone of Russian-American relations. The United States and Russia signed the START-2 agreement on the reduction of nuclear weapons, as well as agreement on the peaceful uses of nuclear energy, and an agreement reducing visa restrictions and providing better monitoring of adoptions. After 15 years of negotiations, Russia finally became a member of the World Trade Organization. Russia permitted the United States to supply its armed forces in Afghanistan via air and land transit. Russian law enforcement agencies began cooperating more regularly with the U.S. Department of Homeland Security, the Drug Enforcement Administration, and the Federal Bureau of Investigation. The U.S. military carried out several joint military exercises with the Russian military, and U.S. aircraft took part in the Moscow air show. For the first time U.S. soldiers participated in the parade on Red Square marking the anniversary of the end of World War II. Although serious differences remained over missile defense, the occupation of Georgian territory and human rights, the political relationship was less confrontational than it had been in previous years.

== References and citations ==
Diplomatic posts
Preceded by James W. Pardew	United States Ambassador to Bulgaria; 2005–2008	Succeeded by Nancy McEldowney
Preceded by William J. Burns	United States Ambassador to Russia; 2008–2012	Succeeded by Michael McFaul
