= Drzewice =

- Neighbourhood of Kostrzyn nad Odrą
- Location within Poland
- Coordinates: 52°36′45″N 14°37′21″E
- Country: Poland
- Voivodeship: Lubusz
- County: Gorzów
- Town: Kostrzyn nad Odrą
- Within town limits: 1952
- Time zone: UTC+1 (CET)
  - Summer (DST): UTC+2 (CEST)
- Vehicle registration: FGW

Drzewice is the north-western borough (osiedle) of the town of Kostrzyn nad Odrą in western Poland.

During World War II, the Stalag III-C German prisoner-of-war camp for Polish, French, British, Serbian, Belgian, Italian, American and Soviet prisoners of war was located there. In 1945, the camp was liberated by the Soviet army, however, Soviet troops killed some American POWs mistaking them for enemy troops.
