= Mariya =

- Gender: feminine

Origin
- Origin: Hebrew

Other names
- Alternative spelling: Mariia
- Related names: Maria, Mariah, Marie, Marija, Mary

Mariya is a variation of the feminine given name Maria. Notable people with the name include:

- Mariya Abakumova (born 1986), Russian javelin thrower
- Mariya Agapova (born 1997), Kazakhstani mixed martial arts fighter
- Mariya Andreyeva (actress) (born 1986), Russian theater and film actress
- Mariya Androsova-Ionova (1864–1941), Russian folklorist, author and performer
- Mariya Aronova (born 1972), Russian actress
- Mariya Babanova (1900–1983), Russian actress
- Mariya Baklakova (born 1997), Russian swimmer
- Mariya Barabanova (1911–1993), Soviet and Russian actress
- Mariya Barykina (born 1973), Russian ice hockey player
- Mariya Basarab (born 1990), Russian handball player
- Mariya Batrakova (1922–1997), Hero of the Soviet Union
- Mariya Bayda (1922–2002), Soviet medic and machine gunner
- Mariya Bespalova (born 1986), Russian hammer thrower
- Mariya Bolikova (born 1977), Russian sprinter
- Mariya Borodayevskaya (1911–1994), Soviet geologist and mineralogist
- Mariya Borovichenko (1925–1943), Soviet soldier
- Mariya Brel (born 1982), Belarusian rower
- Mariya Bugakova (born 1985), Uzbekistani swimmer
- Mariya Mahmoud Bunkure (born 1978), Nigerian medical doctor and politician
- Mariya Butyrskaya (born 1972), Russian figure skater
- Mariya Chernyayeva (born 1966), Soviet synchronised swimmer
- Mariya Chorna (born 1974), Ukrainian politician
- Mariya Ahmed Didi (born 1962), Maldivian politician
- Mariya Dimitrova (born 1976), Bulgarian triple jumper
- Mariya Dimova (skier) (born 1929), Bulgarian cross-country skier
- Mariya Dimova (snowboarder) (born 1974), Bulgarian snowboarder
- Mariya Dmitriyenko (born 1988), Kazakh sport shooter
- Mariya Dolgopolova (born 1997), Ukrainian speed skater
- Mariya Dolina (1922–2010), Soviet WWII dive bomber pilot and Heroine of the Soviet Union
- Mariya Fadeyeva (born 1958), Russian former rower
- Mariya Filipova (born 1982), Bulgarian volleyball player
- Mariya Fomina (born 1993), Russian theater and film actress
- Mariya Fortus (1900–1980), Soviet Jewish translator and intelligence officer
- Mariya Gabriel (born 1979), Bulgarian politician
- Mariya Gambaryan (born 1925), Russian music educator
- Mariya Goricheva (1887–1967), Russian actress
- Mariya Grabovetskaya (born 1987), Kazakhstani weightlifter
- Mariya Grigorova (born 1996), Kazakhstani alpine skier
- Mariya Grinberg (1908–1978), Russian pianist
- Mariya Gromova (born 1984), Russian synchronized swimmer
- Mariya Havrysh (1931–2001), Ukrainian swimmer
- Mariya Stepanivna Humenyuk (1914–1995), Soviet politician
- Mariya Ionova (born 1978), Ukrainian politician
- Mariya Ise (born 1988), Japanese voice actress
- Maria Leontyavna Itkina (1932–2020), Soviet runner
- Mariya Karakasheva (born 1988), Bulgarian volleyball player
- Mariya Karashka (born 1942), Bulgarian artistic gymnast
- Mariya Kartalova (born 1969), Bulgarian artistic gymnast
- Mariya Khalatova (1870–1960), Russian actress
- Mariya Khan (born 1988), Pakistani actress
- Mariya Khomutova (born 1987), Ukrainian actress and playwright
- Mariya Kircheva (born 1957), Bulgarian gymnast
- Mariya Kirova (born 1982), better known as simply Maria, Bulgarian singer
- Mariya Kiselyova (born 1974), Russian synchronized swimmer
- Mariya Kislyak (1925–1943), Soviet Ukrainian partisan
- Mariya Kocheva (born 1974), Bulgarian swimmer
- Mariya Konovalova (born 1974), Russian long-distance runner
- Mariya Korobitskaya (born 1990), Kyrgyzstani long-distance runner
- Mariya Koroleva (born 1990), American synchronized swimmer
- Mariya Koroteyeva (born 1981), Russian hurdler
- Mariya Koryttseva (born 1985), Ukrainian tennis player
- Mariya Kozhevnikova (born 1984), Russian actress and politician
- Mariya Krivopolenova (1843–1924), Russian folklore performer and storyteller
- Mariya Kuznetsova (singer) (1880–1966), Russian opera singer
- Mariya Kuznetsova (pilot) (1918–1990), Soviet fighter pilot
- Mariya Lagunova (1921–1995), Soviet tank driver
- Mariya Lasitskene (born 1993), Russian high jumper
- Mariya Litoshenko (born 1949), Soviet handball player
- Mariya Litovskaya (born 1958), Russian academic
- Mariya Livchikova (born 1995), Ukrainian artistic gymnast
- Mariya Liver (born 1990), Ukrainian swimmer
- Mariya Livytska (1879–1971), Wife of the first Ukrainian president
- Mariya Lugovaya (born 1987), Russian actress and theater star
- Mariya Dashkina Maddux, Ukrainian modern dancer
- Mariya Manolova (born 1963), Bulgarian biathlete
- Maryam Mariya, Maldivian politician
- Ravi Mariya (born 1972), Indian film director and actor
- Mariya Markina (born 1953), Russian model
- Mariya Mateva (born 1994), Bulgarian rhythmic gymnast
- Mariya Melentyeva (1924–1943), Soviet Karelian partisan
- Mariya Mikhailyuk (born 1991), Russian sprinter
- Mariya Mitsova (born 1996), Bulgarian badminton player
- Mariya Muzychuk (born 1992), Ukrainian chess grandmaster
- Mariya Mykolenko (born 1994), Ukrainian hurdler
- Mariya Nagao (born 1994), Japanese television personality
- Mariya Nesterenko (1910–1941), Soviet military aviator
- Mariya Netesova (born 1983), Russian rhythmic gymnast
- Mariya Nikolova (born 1951), Bulgarian swimmer
- Mariya Nishiuchi (born 1993), Japanese former actress and model
- Mariya Nzigiyimana (born 1934), Burundian midwife and Quaker
- Mariya Ocher (born 1986), Israeli singer, poet and artist
- Mariya Ohurtsova (born 1983), Ukrainian swimmer
- Mariya Oktyabrskaya (1905–1944), Soviet war hero
- Mariya Omelianovych (born 1960), Ukrainian rower
- Mariya Onolbayeva (born 1978), Russian ice hockey player
- Mariya Orlyk (1930–2022), Ukrainian politician
- Mariya Oryashkova (born 1988), Bulgarian sambo practitioner and freestyle wrestler
- Mariya Osipova (1908–1999), Soviet Belarusian partisan
- Mariya Ovchinnikova (born 1998), Kazakhstani triple jumper
- Mariya Ovechkina (born 1990), Russian model
- Mariya Pak (born 2005), Uzbekistani rhythmic gymnast
- Mariya Panfilova (born 1987), Russian biathlete
- Mariya Payun (born 1953), Soviet rower
- Mariya Petkova (born 1950), Bulgarian discus thrower
- Mariya Petrovykh (1908–1979), Russian poet and translator
- Mariya Pinigina (born 1958), Soviet sprinter
- Mariya Pisareva (1933–2023), Soviet high jumper
- Mariya Pogrebnyak (born 1996), Russian rugby sevens player
- Mariya Polivanova (1922–1942), Soviet sniper
- Mariya Polyakova (born 1974), Ukrainian volleyball player
- Mariya Poroshina (born 1973), Russian stage and film actress
- Mariya Povkh (born 1989), Ukrainian canoeist
- Mariya Prusakova (snowboarder) (born 1989), Russian snowboarder
- Mariya Pupchenkova (born 1998), Kazakhstani handball player
- Mariya Ralcheva (born 1978), Ukrainian sprint canoer
- Mariya Rudnitskaya (1916–1983), Russian Soviet realist painter, graphic artist, and art teacher
- Mariya Russell, American chef and restaurateur
- Mariya Ryemyen (born 1987), Ukrainian sprinter
- Mariya Saakyan (1980–2018), Russian film director and screenwriter
- Mariya Savinova (born 1985), Russian middle-distance runner
- Mariya Sergeyenko (1891–1987), Soviet scholar
- Mariya Sergeyeva (born 1983), Kazakhstani chess player
- Mariya Shah (born 1984), Indian politician
- Mariya Shalayeva (born 1981), Russian actress
- Mariya Sarapova (Maria Sharapova; born 1987), Russian tennis player
- Mariya Shatalova (born 1989), Ukrainian middle-distance runner
- Mariya Shcherba (born 1985), Belarusian swimmer
- Mariya Shcherbachenko (1922–2016), Soviet combat medic
- Mariya Shcherbina (born 1958), Ukrainian mathematician
- Mariya Shekerova (born 1988), Uzbekistani-Russian Olympic judoka
- Mariya Shishkova (born 1953), Bulgarian sprinter
- Mariya Shkarletova (1925–2003), Ukrainian Hero of the Soviet Union
- Mariya Shkolna (born 1998), Ukrainian and Luxembourgish archer
- Mariya Shkolnik (1885–1955), Russian politician and terrorist
- Mariya Shorets (born 1990), Russian triathlete
- Mariya Shubina (1930–2025), Soviet canoeist
- Mariya Sidorova (born 1979), Russian handball player
- Mariya Sitnikova (born 1998), Kazakhstani handball player
- Mariya Sizyakova (born 1935), Soviet pentathlete
- Mariya Slokotovich (born 1989), Kazakhstani cyclist
- Mariya Smirnova (1920–2002), Soviet Air Force hero
- Mariya Sokova (born 1970), Russian-Uzbekistani triple jumper
- Mariya Stadnik (born 1988), Ukrainian-Azerbaijani freestyle wrestler
- Mariya Stepanova (1815–1903), Russian opera singer
- Mariya Stoyanova (born 1947), Bulgarian basketball player
- Mariya Suzuki (born 1991), Japanese idol, singer and actress
- Mariya Svistunova (1778–1866), Lady-in-waiting at the Russian Court
- Mariya Takeuchi (born 1955), Japanese singer and songwriter
- Mariya Telushkina (born 1994), Kazakhstani discus thrower
- Mariya Tikhvinskaya (born 1970), Russian snowboarder
- Mariya Tolstova (1918–2004), Soviet World War II pilot
- Mariya Trubach (born 1999), Belarusian rhythmic gymnast
- Mariya Tsukanova (1924–1945), Soviet combat medic
- Mariya Vasilieva (born 1963), Russian legal academic
- Mariya Ivanovna Vassiliéva (1884–1957), Russian painter
- Mariya Vasiltsova (born 1995), Russian snowboarder
- Mariya Vernadskaya (1831–1860), Russian political economist
- Mariya Volkonskaya (1804–1863), Wife of Prince Sergey Volkonsky
- Mariya Voloshchenko (born 1989), Ukrainian diver
- Mariya Vorona (born 1983), Belarusian rower
- Mariya Voyvodova (born 1978), Bulgarian-born Swedish politician
- Mariya Yakovenko (born 1982), Russian javelin thrower
- Mariya Yalova (born 1981), Kazakhstani footballer
- Mariya Yamada (born 1980), Japanese actress and a gravure idol
- Mariya Yaremchuk (born 1993), Ukrainian singer
- Mariya Zakharchenko (born 1995), Ukrainian Go player
- Mariya Zerova (1902–1994), Botanist and scientist
- Mariya Zubova (1749–1799), Russian composer and concert singer
- Mariya Zhukova (1805–1855), Russian writer
