= Masha =

In Russian, Masha (Маша) is a diminutive of Maria. In Ukrainian, it is also a diminutive of Mariia or Mariya. It has been used as a nickname or as a pet name for women named Maria or Marie. An alternative spelling in the Latin alphabet is "Macha". In Serbo-Croatian and Slovene, "Maša" is a diminutive of "Marija" but can be a given name in its own right.

The Jewish name Masha (מַשה) is of Biblical extraction. Tradition has it that the first Masha was named after a departed male named Moshe (Moses).

== Other diminutives of Maria ==
There are a large number of diminutives (nicknames) in Russian for Maria beside Masha:

- Marusya (Маруся)
- Manya (Маня)
- Manyunya (Манюня)
- Manyasha (Маняша)
- Mashunya (Машуня)
- Mashuta (Машута)
- Mashenka (Машенька)
- Mar'ya (Марья)
- Mashulya (Машуля)
- Mashka (Машка)

== Notable people ==
- Masha Bruskina (1924–1941), Soviet partisan of the Minsk Resistance
- Masha Dashkina Maddux, Ukrainian dancer
- Masha Gessen (born 1967), Russian and American journalist and author
- Maria Kolenkina, Russian socialist revolutionary of the late 19th century
- Masha and Dasha Krivoshlyapova (1950–2003), Russian conjoined twins
- Masha Lubelsky (born 1936), Israeli politician
- Masha Ma, Chinese fashion designer
- Masha Rasputina (born 1964), Russian pop singer
- Masha (singer) or Masha Shirin (born 1990 or 1991), Latvian-born American pop singer
- Marie Yovanovitch (born 1958), American diplomat who served as ambassador to Kyrgyzstan, Armenia and Ukraine
- Maria "Masha Scream" Arkhipova (born 1983), lead singer of the Russian folk metal band Arkona
- Maria Viktorovna (born 1986), Russian-American YouTuber and ASMR performer
- Maria Vladimirovna "Masha" Alyokhina (born 1988), Russian political activist and musician.
- Masha Efrosynina (born 1979), Ukrainian television host
- Masha Kondratenko (born 1999), Ukrainian pop singer

== Fictional characters ==
- Masha, heroine of the Russian TV series Masha and the Bear
- Masha, heroine of Pushkin's novel The Captain's Daughter
- Masha, one of the title characters in The Three Sisters (play) by Anton Chekhov
- Masha, Ilya's and Polina's daughter in The Seagull, another Chekhov play
- Masha, in the Tokyo Mew Mew manga series
- Masha, part of Elizabeth's entourage in the film Young Frankenstein
- Masha, obsessed fan in The King of Comedy (1983) played by Sandra Bernhard
- Maria "Masha", title character in Hayden Kopser's novella Masha (2021)
- Masha Dmitrichenko, in the series Nine Perfect Strangers, based on the novel of the same name
- Maria "Masha" Mikhailovna Kujō, a character from the light nove/anime series Alya Sometimes Hides Her Feelings in Russian
- Marya "Masha" Morevna, main character in Deathless, a retelling of Russian folklore
- Masha Rostova, Elizabeth Keen's birth name in the TV series The Blacklist
