= Mariia =

Mariia (Russian: Мария, Ukrainian: Марія) is a feminine given name. It is cognate to the given name Maria in English and other languages.

The Russian and Ukrainian given names have the spelling variants Maria, Marija, and Mariya.

Notable people with the name include:

- Mariia Aniichyn (born 2007), Ukrainian freestyle skier
- Mariia Balakina (born 2003), Polish rhythmic gymnast
- Mariia Biletska (1864–1937), Ukrainian teacher
- Mariia Bogacheva (born 1977), Russian Paralympic athlete
- Mariia Grazhina Chaplin (born 1981), Ukrainian journalist, television presenter and producer
- Mariia Cherepanova (born 1987), Russian basketball player
- Mariia Dilai (born 1980), Ukrainian artist
- Mariia Dudina (born 1998), Russian handballer
- Mariia Fedorovtseva (born 2007), Russian rhythmic gymnast
- Mariia Halushko (1937–2024), Ukrainian master of artistic ceramics
- Mariia Hanhur (born 2000), Ukrainian weightlifter
- Mariia Holubtsova (born 2000), Ukrainian ice dancer
- Mariia Hryniuk (born 1959), Ukrainian art historian and ceramist
- Mariia Ignateva (born 2003), Russian-Hungarian ice dancer
- Mariia Ivanova (born 2003), Russian judoka
- Mariia Karpiuk (1900–1978), Ukrainian painter
- Mariia Khokhelko (born 2008), Short track speed skater from Ukraine
- Mariia Kichasova-Skoryk (born 1993), Ukrainian canoeist
- Mariia Kravtsova (born 2000), Russian rhythmic gymnast
- Mariia Krompets-Morachevska (1897–1960), Ukrainian painter
- Mariia Kushnirchuk (1926–2005), Ukrainian nationalist military woman
- Mariia Lafina (born 1993), Ukrainian Paralympic swimmer
- Mariia Latritskaia (born 2002), Russian para swimmer
- Mariia Pavlova (born 1998), Russian Paralympic swimmer
- Mariia Persidskaia (born 1991), Russian judoka
- Mariia Pinchuk (born 2006), Ukrainian ice dancer
- Mariia Pomazan (born 1988), Ukrainian Paralympic athlete
- Mariia Posa (born 1988), Finnish ice hockey player
- Mariia Sakharuk (born 1995), Ukrainian racewalker
- Mariia Seniuk (born 2005), Russian-Israeli figure skater
- Mariia Shpatkivska (born 2000), Ukrainian Paralympic athlete
- Mariia Shtepa (1925–2020), Ukrainian writer, participant in the national liberation struggle
- Mariia Starytska (1865–1930), Ukrainian actress and director
- Mariia Stefiuk (born 1948), Ukrainian opera singer and music teacher
- Mariia Stoliarenko (born 2004), Ukrainian badminton player
- Mariia Surovshchikova-Petipa (1836–1882), Russian prima ballerina
- Mariia Tailakova (born 2001), Russian table tennis player
- Mariia Tkacheva (born 2001), Russian tennis player
- Mariia Tymchuk (born 1989), Ukrainian master of decorative and applied arts
- Mariia Vetrova (1870–1897), Ukrainian teacher and revolutionary
- Mariia Vysochanska (born 2002), Ukrainian rhythmic gymnast
- Mariia Yaremak (born 1997), Ukrainian composer
- Mariia Yunak (1902–1977), Ukrainian painter
