= Gennady Ladyzhensky =

Russian painter

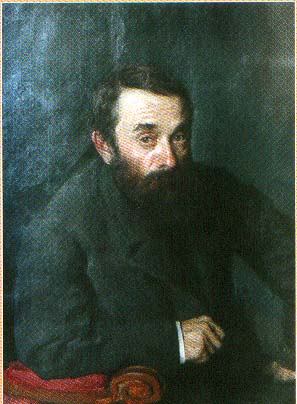
Gennady Ladyzhensky (1894). Portrait by Nikolai Kuznetsov

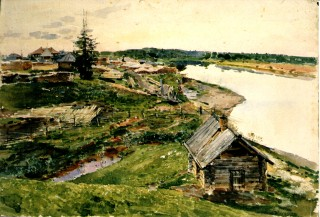
Landscape Near Kologriv

Gennady Aleksandrovich Ladyzhensky (Russian: Генна́дий Алекса́ндрович Лады́женский; 23 January 1852, Kologriv - 2 September 1916, Kologriv) was a landscape painter from the Russian Empire. He was an Academician at the Imperial Academy of Arts.

== Biography ==
His father was the Parish Clerk. At first, he studied to be an architect. In 1872, he prepared drawings and watercolors of the sixteenth-century churches in Yaroslavl, Kostroma and Nizhny Novgorod. After that, he decided to take up landscape painting and studied with Mikhail Clodt. He was also influenced by the works of Ivan Shishkin and Ivan Kramskoi.

In 1879, he was awarded the title of "Artist, Second Degree" and became a drawing teacher at the "Odessa Academy of Fine Arts". He began to exhibit widely in the mid-1880s and, in 1890, became one of the founders of the "Society of South Russian Artists". In 1891, he received the Order of Saint Stanislaus, third degree, from Tsar Alexander III. From 1892 through 1893, he toured Turkey, Crimea and the Caucasus, creating sketches of local life and customs, as well as landscapes. Among his best-known students were Boris Anisfeld, Pyotr Nilus and Oleksii Shovkunenko. His brother's granddaughter was famous mathematician Olga Ladyzhenskaya.

In 1910, the Imperial Academy named him an Academician although, by that time, he had largely given up painting in favor of collecting. Eventually, his collection encompassed not only art, but books, weapons, porcelain, furniture and various items from the Middle East.

When he retired in 1914, he returned to his hometown and attempted to organize a museum. The First World War made this impossible, however, and the museum was not created until 1918, after his death. Most of his paintings are there.
