= Ivan Proshak =

Ukrainian nationalist activist (1922–1999)

- Іван Прошак
- Born: 2 June 1922; Chomiakówka, Stanisławów Voivodeship, Poland (now Khomiakivka, Ukraine)
- Died: 14 January 1999 (aged 76); Kolomyia, Ivano-Frankivsk region, Ukraine
- Citizenship: Poland; Soviet Union; Ukraine
- Years active: 1938–1945 (as a member of OUN)
- Known for: Political activist; victim of Nazi and Soviet labour camps
- Spouse: Mariia Kushnirchuk
- Children: 2, including Olesia

Signature
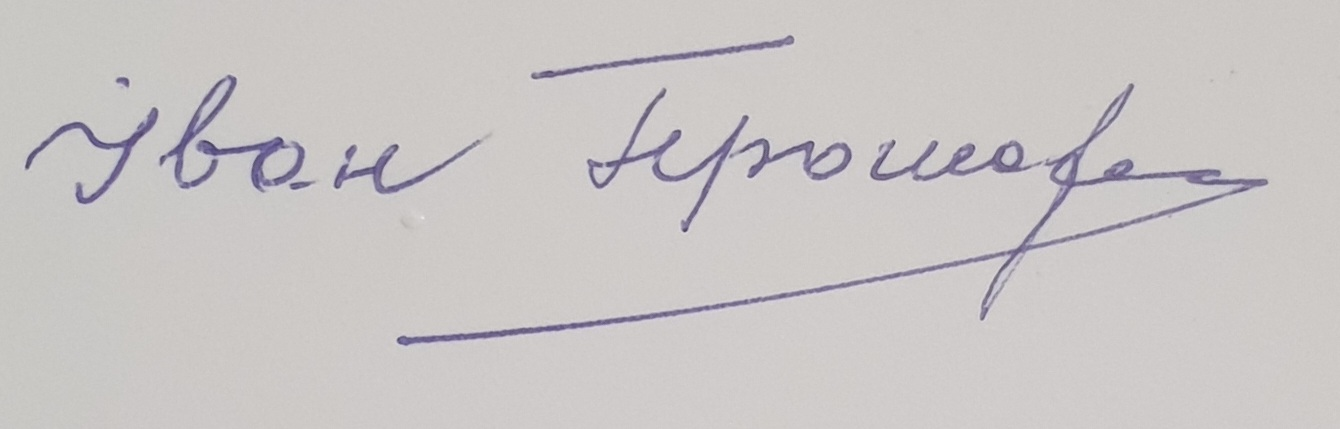

Ivan Lukianovych Proshak (Ukrainian: Іван Лук'янович Прошак; 2 June 1922 – 14 January 1999) was a member of the Ukrainian Insurgent Army and a victim of Nazi (1941–1943) and Soviet (1945–1957) camps. In the 1990s, he was a political activist and a member of All-Ukrainian political prisoners' congresses.

== Biography ==
Ivan Proshak was born on 2 June 1922 in a village Chomiakówka near Tysmenytsia in a family of Lukian Proshak, the head of the local library of Prosvita.

He studied at a four-grade school. In 1934, together with schoolchildren, he visited Kolomyia, where he met the writer Andriy Tchaikovsky. In 1938, he joined the Organization of Ukrainian Nationalists.

With the onset of the Soviet invasion of Poland in 1939, he worked as an accountant on a kolkhoz till 1941. In 1941, he was sent to German concentration camps, where he mined coal near the city of Dortmund, where he remained until 1943.

In 1943 he joined the Ukrainian Insurgent Army. In August 1943, he took part in the battle in the village of Zarichchya in the Nadvirna region with German and Hungarian units, where 60 Nazis were killed. Ivan Proshak also distinguished himself in the battles in Olesha in Bratove Forest (24 September 1944), Perehinsk, Tatariv and Porohy. During his service, he was acquainted with the commander of the "Dzvony" kurin Petro Melnyk, the commander of the "Bells" kurin Luka Hrynishak, the commander of the UPA "Syvulya" kurin, Vasyl Yaskiv, the commander of the "Dovbush" kurin Ivan Gonta and other well-known figures of the OUN and UIA.

In December 1944, he was transferred to the OUN structure to the position of propagandist of the bush No. 4 (Khomyakivka) of the Tysmenytsia OUN district under the pseudo "Oleg". On 15 March 1945, in an armed clash between OUN members and the NKVD internal troops in Khomyakivka, where 20 rebels died along with Maria Kapechuk and her five-year-old daughter Halyna, Proshak was wounded and fell into the hands of the NKVD together with Hryhorii Baleniuk. No investigative actions were carried out during March–September 1945. On 16 October 1945, by the decision of the NKVD military tribunal in the Stanislav region, Proshak was sentenced to 20 years in a labor camp and 5 years of restriction of rights with confiscation of property. In January 1946, he arrived at a labor camp in Vorkuta (Vorkutlag).

From 13 April 1949 to 1953, he worked in the 6th camp department as an accountant of the settlement department, where he actively opposed the Soviet government. On 28 January 1955, the Military Tribunal of the Precarpathian Military District reduced the term of sentence from 20 to 10 years of labor camps. On 12 February 1956, he was released, and on 18 April 1957, due to the lack of evidence and witnesses, he was rehabilitated by decision of the Military Collegium of the Supreme Court of the USSR.

Then Ivan Proshak studied first at a mining college, and later at the Vorkuta branch of the Leningrad Mining Institute named after Plekhanov, where he received an education as an engineer-economist. In the 1960s, he was elected head of the trade union at the mine due to Ivan Proshak's protection of the rights of political prisoners. He then worked as a dispatcher at the Vorkutaugol plant.

In December 1977, he returned to Ukraine and moved to Kolomyia with his family.

In the 1990s, he was an active participant in all-Ukrainian and international congresses of political prisoners: in 1990, he took part in the World Assembly of Political Prisoners of All Countries in Kyiv, in 1993 – in the II World Congress of Ukrainian Political Prisoners in Kyiv, in 1995 – in the International Congress of Political Prisoners of Communist Regimes in Kyiv, where he delivered his speeches about the inaction of the authorities in protecting the repressed and political prisoners, UIA veterans.

On 24 August 1992, Ivan Proshak was one of the main speakers at a ceremonial meeting in the People's House dedicated to the Independence of Ukraine and the 50th anniversary of the Ukrainian Insurgent Army. On 25 October 1992, he took part in the reburial of UIA soldier Fedir Kuzenko in the village of Rungury from his house to the village cemetery.

In 1994, he became a referent for Yevhen Proniuk, a candidate for People's Deputy of Ukraine. In December 1994, as a member of the Society of Political Prisoners and Repressed People, he supported the struggle of the Chechens for the independence of their country during the First Chechen War.

Because of his long-term illness, he died on 14 January 1999 in Kolomyia.

== Personal life ==
Ivan Proshak married to repressed by Soviet regime Mariia Kushnirchuk in the 1950s.

They had two children:

- Anastasiia Proshak (born 27 October 1956)
- Olesia Proshak (later Hudymiak; born 10 May 1958).

== Memory ==
In May 2026, a book "To the Memory of the Unbroken Couple", where Ivan Proshak is one of main characters, was published. On June 4, this book was represented by local historian Illya Kryvoruchko.
