= Olesia Hudymiak =

Ukrainian history teacher (born 1958)

- Олеся Гудимяк
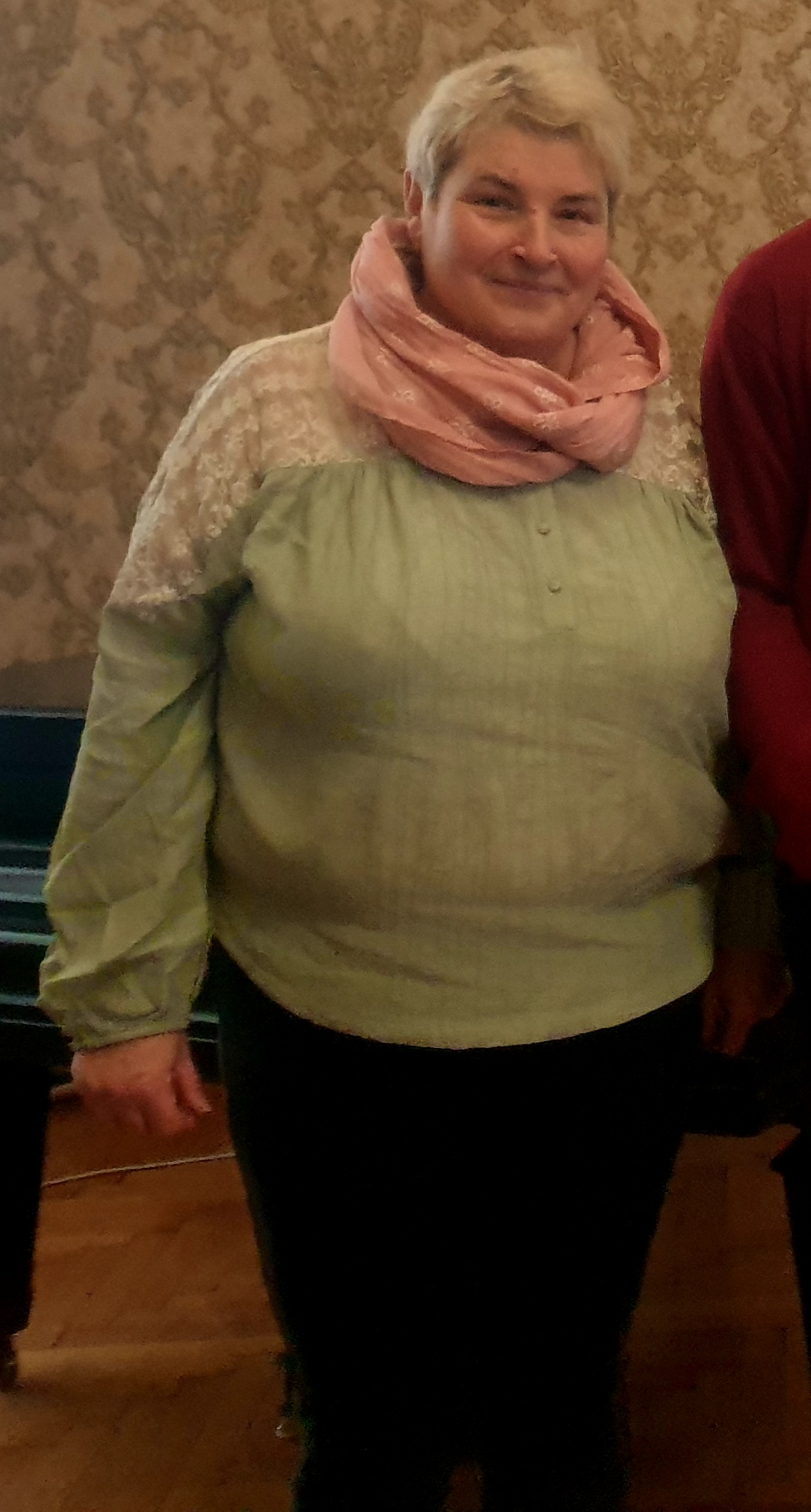
- Hudymiak in 2026
- Born: 10 May 1958 (age 68); Vorkuta, Komi ASSR, Russian SFSR, Soviet Union
- Citizenship: Soviet Union; Ukraine (since 1991)
- Education: Syktyvkar State University (1975–1982)
- Occupation: History teacher
- Years active: 1986–present
- Children: 2
- Parents: Ivan Proshak (father); Mariia Kushnirchuk (mother)

Olesia Ivanivna Hudymiak (née Proshak; (Note: Ukrainian: Прошак) Ukrainian: Олеся Іванівна Гудимяк; born 10 May 1958) is a Ukrainian history teacher and daughter of political prisoners and UPA soldiers Ivan Proshak and Mariia Kushnirchuk.

== Biography ==
Olesia Hudymiak was born on 10 May 1958 in Vorkuta in a Ukrainian nationalist family, where her parents were the UPA militaries and Vorkutlag camp victims. She studied at the local school №16 till 1975, because KGB had prohibited her family from living in Ukraine.

Then Olesia tried to go to Ivanovo State University, but, after passing entrance exams, she was refused because of her family's biography. So, in 1975, she began to study history at Syktyvkar State University, which from gratulated in 1982. She had already had an older daughter Nadiia.

At the age of 28, she returned to Ukraine and started living in Kolomyia with her family. Olesia initially worked as a librarian at a local library №3, but later she was fired because of her repressed parents. In 1986–1989, Hudymiak worked as a labor teacher and a language laboratory assistant at school №1 named after Vasyl Stefanyk till her birth of younger daughter Yuliia. Because of Chernobyl disaster, her older daughter died from blood cancer on 19 August 1990.

In 1993, after her maternity leave, Olesia Hudymiak became an history teacher of school №1 till 2022. She has a rank of a "specialist of higher category". In May 2010, she organized the meeting with famous participant of the Ukrainian Insurgent Army Myroslav Symchych at the school. It was initiated by a political party "For Ukraine" as a protest against a pro-Russian policy of the minister of education and science of Ukraine Dmytro Tabachnyk. In 2017, she prepared her pupil Ivan Feniak to the 3rd place of the 4th highest stage of an All-Ukrainian pupils' history olympiad. In 2020–2022, Olesia also taught Taras Symak, a winner of the 3rd highest stage of the All-Ukrainian pupils' history olympiad in 2026.

In 2019, together with her pupils, Olesia initiated a trip to a three-day seminar in Ivano-Frankivsk, dedicated to the memory of Anne Frank, a Jewish girl who kept a diary during the war and described the horrors. And then there was a field trip, which was conducted by the children participating in the seminar.

Many students have described Olesia as a principled, honest, and professional history teacher.

Since 2022, Olesia Hudymiak is a history teacher of school in Lisna Slobidka. Olesia is also a member of the Society of Political Prisoners and Repressed People. On 24 August 2023, she was awarded the diploma of a mayor of Kolomyia as a member of the society for contribution to the struggle for Ukrainian independence.

Hudymiak also saves archived materials and photos about her nationalist family, used in many articles about last one. In May 2026, a book about her repressed family "To the Memory of the Unbroken Couple", where Olesia is reminded, was published. On June 4, this book was represented by local historian Illya Kryvoruchko.
