= Nikolai Dmitriyevich Kuznetsov (painter) =

Russian painter (1850–1929)

Nikolai Kuznetsov
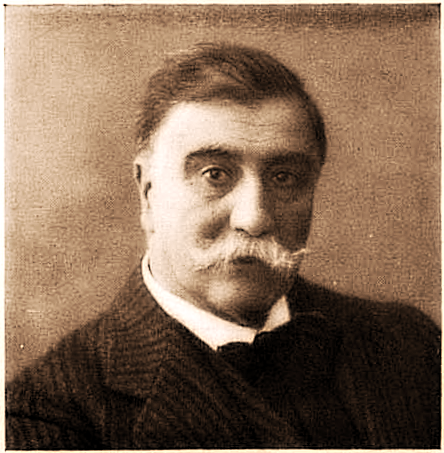
- Kuznetsov before 1914
- Born: December 2, 1850; Stepanovka, Kherson Governorate, Russian Empire
- Died: March 2, 1929 (aged 78); Sarajevo, Kingdom of Serbs, Croats, and Slovenes
- Education: Pavel Chistyakov
- Known for: Painting
- Spouse: Anna Protsenko (m. 1888)
- Children: 3, including Mariya
- Elected: Member Academy of Arts (1895); Full Member Academy of Arts (1900)

Nikolai Dmitriyevich Kuznetsov (Russian: Никола́й Дми́триевич Кузнецо́в; 14 December [O.S. 2 December] 1850 – 2 March 1929) was a Russian Realist painter, active in Odessa during Tsars Alexander III and Nicholas II's reigns and then in Yugoslavia during the Interwar era, best known for his portraits and genre pictures. A second-tier member of the Peredvizhniki, Kuznetsov was also a founding member in the Partnership of South-Russian Artists.

== Biography ==
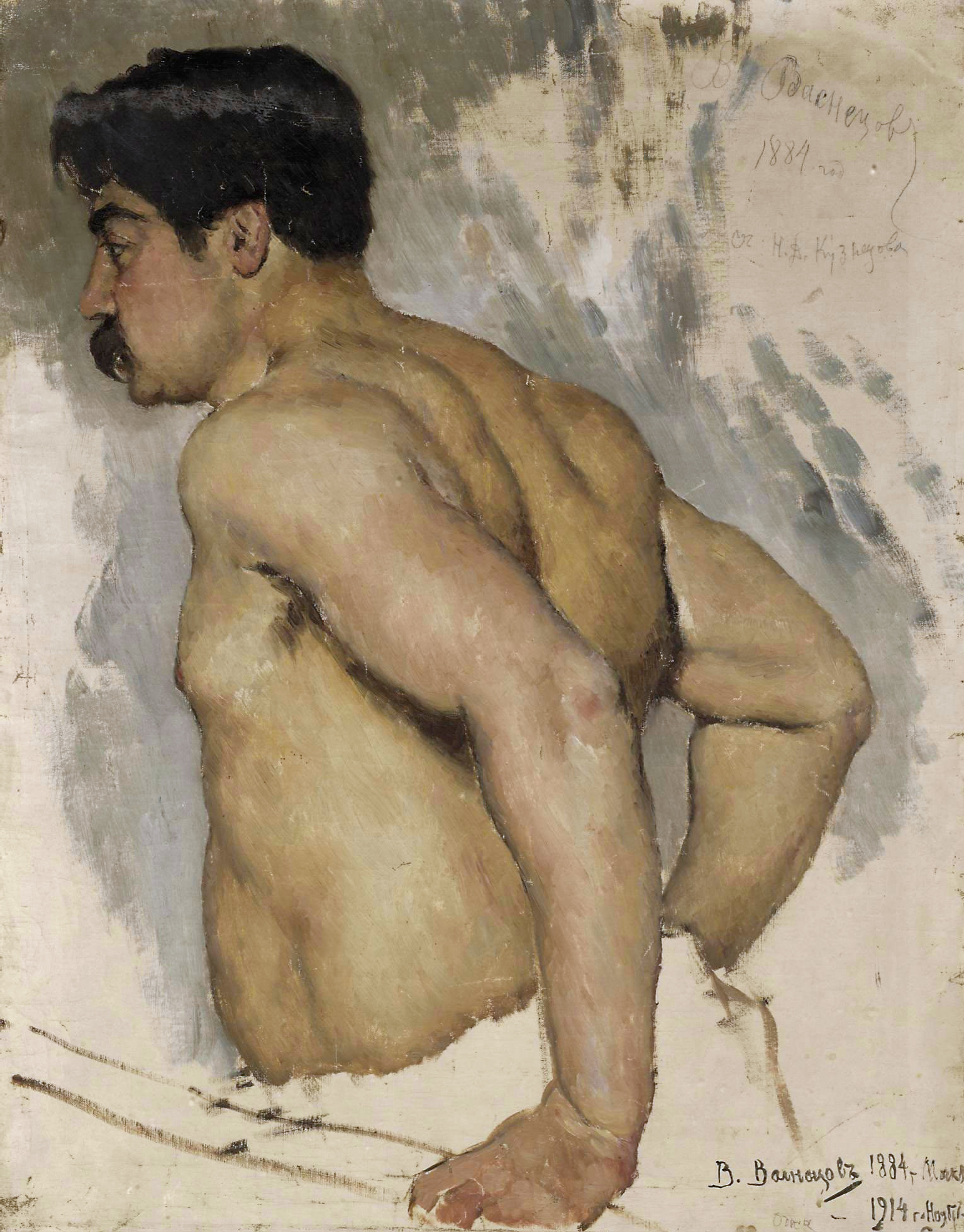
Portrait of Kuznetsov by Viktor Vasnetsov (1884)

Nikolai Kuznetsov was born in Stepanovka, in Kherson Governorate of the Russian Empire (now Ukraine). Kuznetsov was the son of a wealthy landowner and began school in Odessa, where his artistic talent was discovered and he began taking lessons at the local drawing school. From 1876 to 1880, he attended the Imperial Academy of Arts, where he studied with Pavel Chistyakov. He was considered to be a good student, but often left the academy to paint at the family estate. At this time, he successfully defied his family's wishes and married a working-class woman who was employed there.

Following graduation, he was a frequent exhibitor throughout Russia and Ukraine and received numerous commissions. Among his portrait sitters were Peter Tchaikovsky and Élie Metchnikoff. During this time, he was a frequent visitor to the Abramtsevo Colony. Because of his large, wrestler's physique, he often served as a model for his Peredvizhniki allies, notably including Ilya Repin.

After an accident in 1889, he had to walk on crutches, so he worked entirely in a studio at his estate, which became a meeting place for the creative community, including figures such as Fyodor Chaliapin, in addition to artists. In 1893, somewhat recovered, he moved his studio to Odessa and began exhibiting. Two years later, he was offered a professorship at the Imperial Academy, where he taught battle painting, but left in 1897 to return to Odessa. In 1900, he became an Academician and a member of the Peredvizhniki. That same year, he exhibited at the Exposition Universelle in Paris. Later, he travelled extensively to exhibitions throughout Europe.

In 1920, during the Russian Civil War, as the White Army retreated, he and his family emigrated to Yugoslavia, eventually settling in Sarajevo, where he died in 1929.

His daughter was the opera singer Maria Nikolaevna Kuznetsova.

== Selected works ==
Portrait paintings

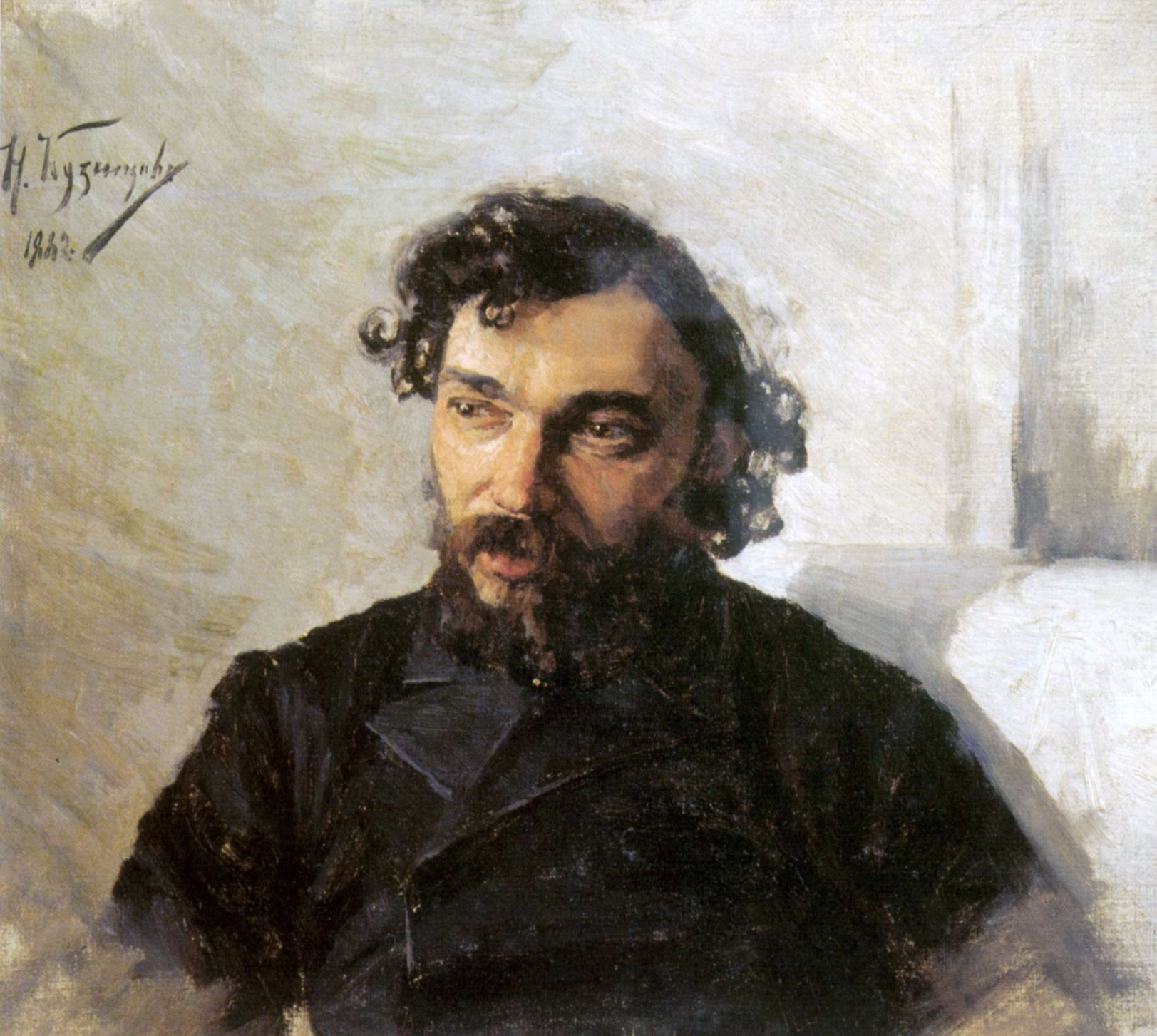
Ivan Pokhitonov, 1882

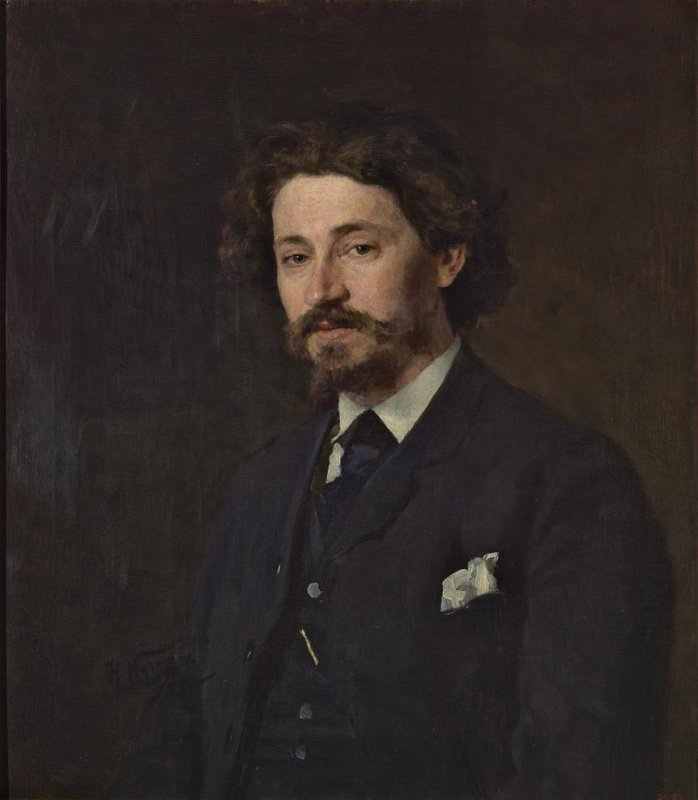
Ilya Repin, 1885

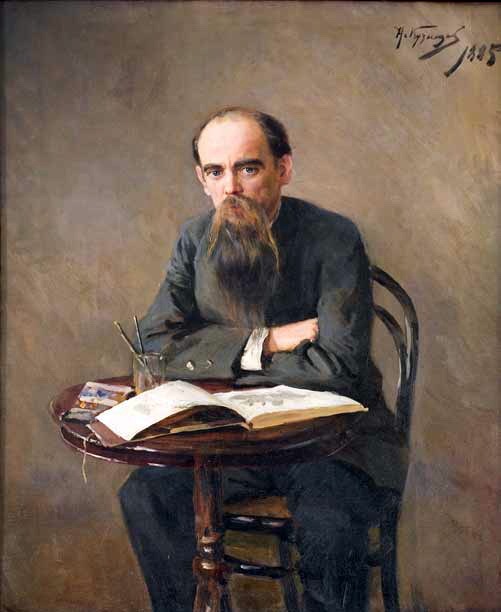
Yefim Volkov, 1885

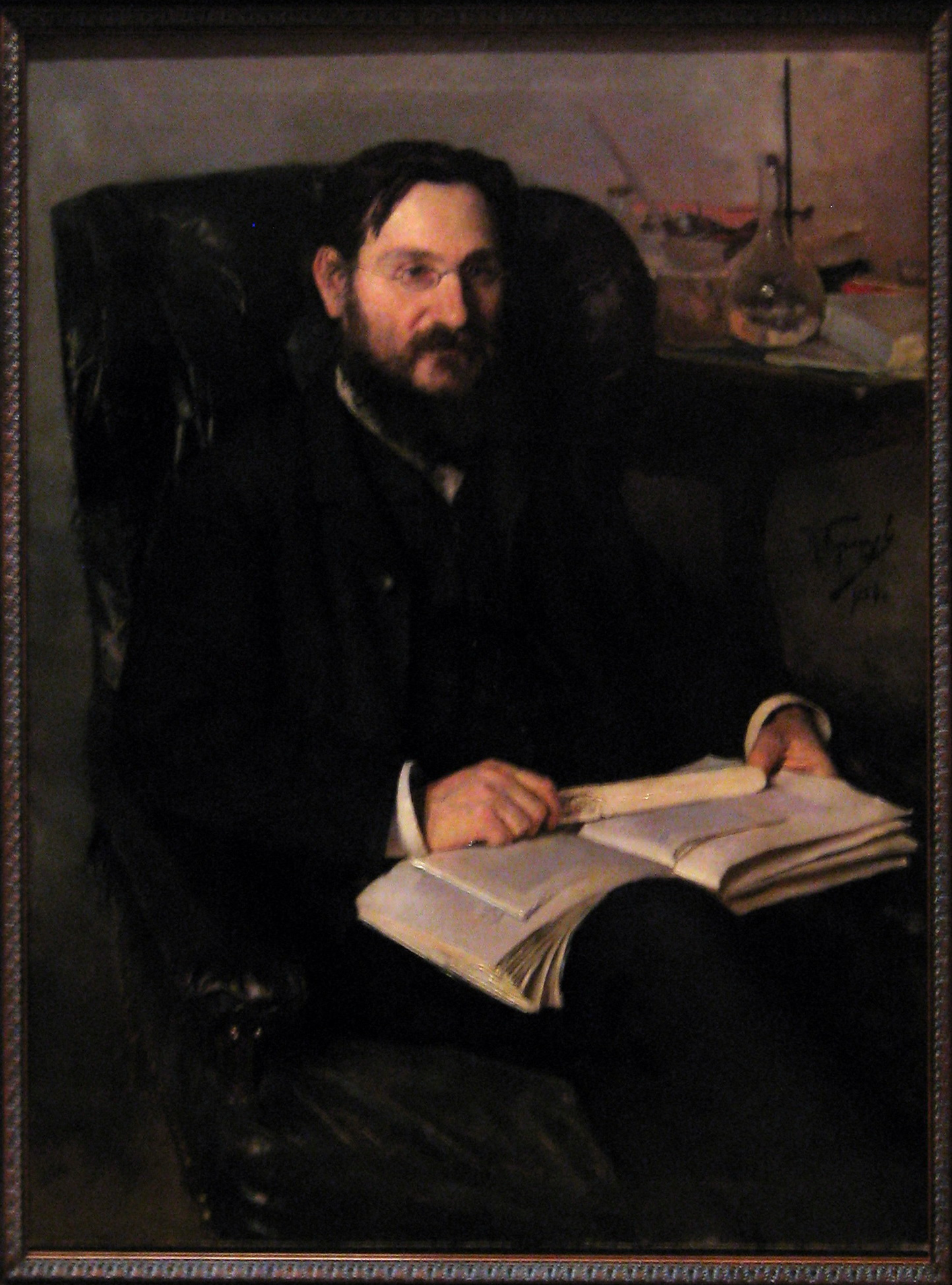
Élie Metchnikoff, 1886

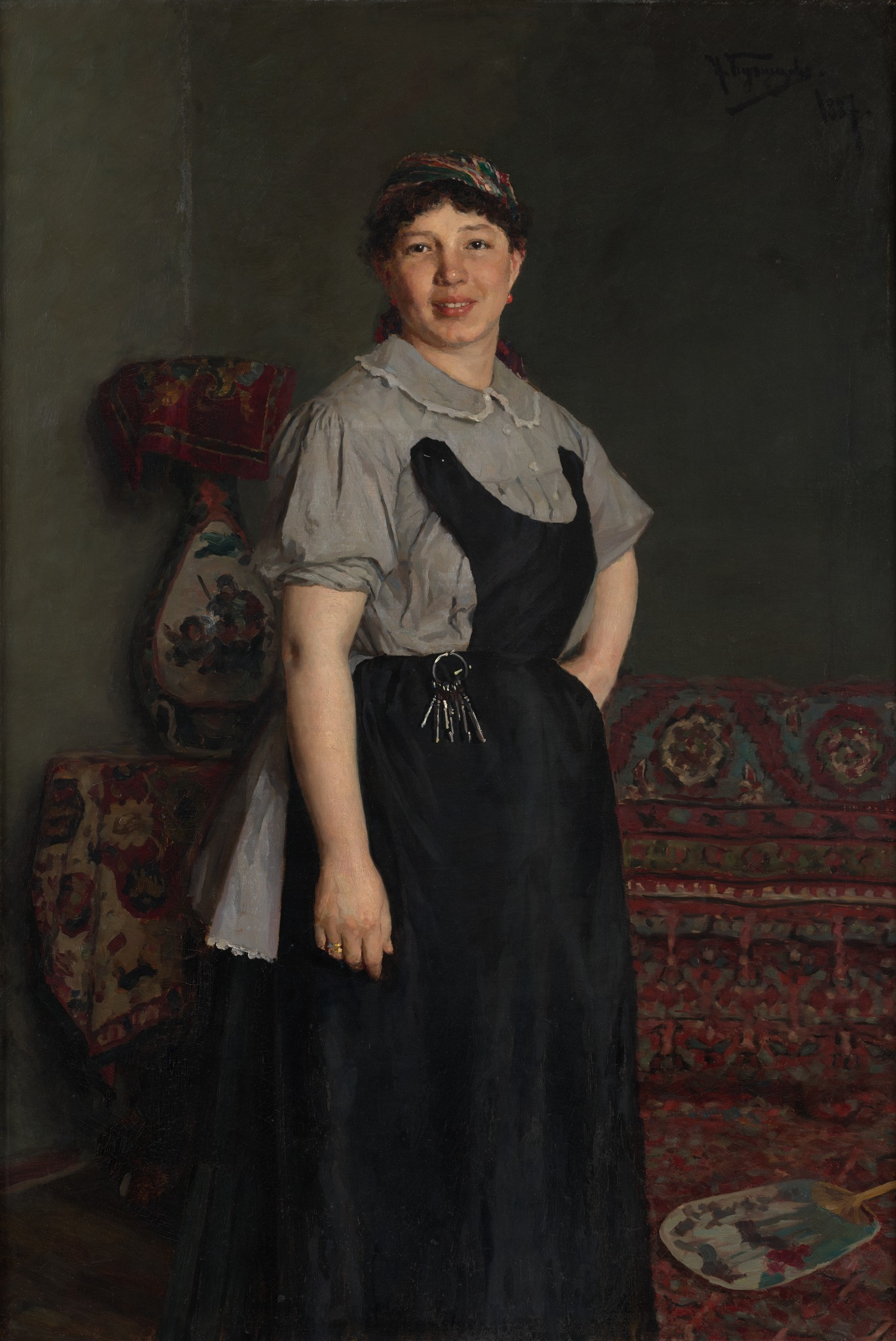
The Keyholder, portrayal of Anna Protsenko, the painter's spouse, 1887

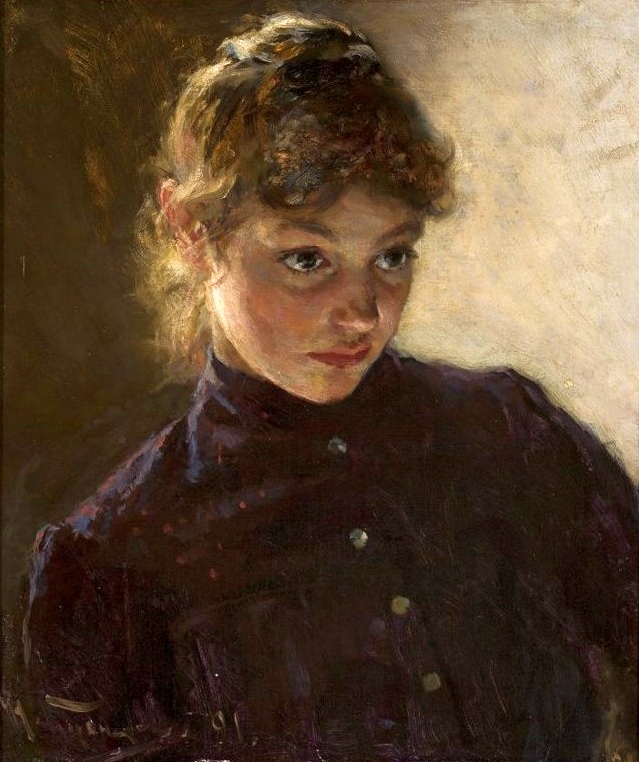
Young Girl, 1891

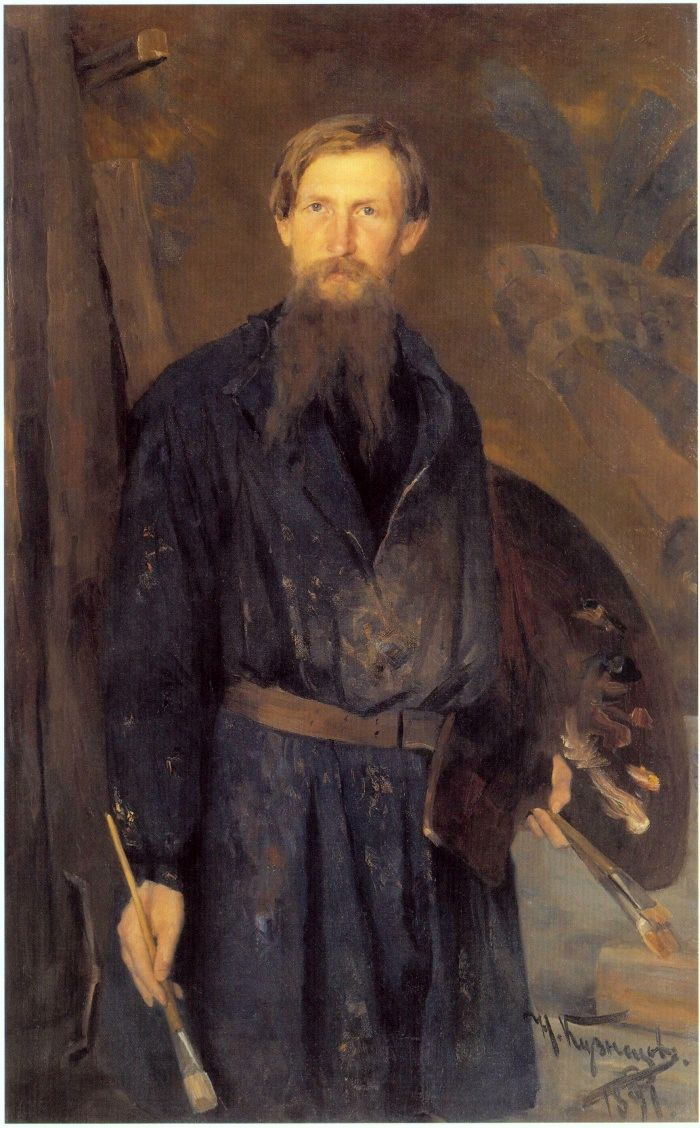
Viktor Vasnetsov, 1891

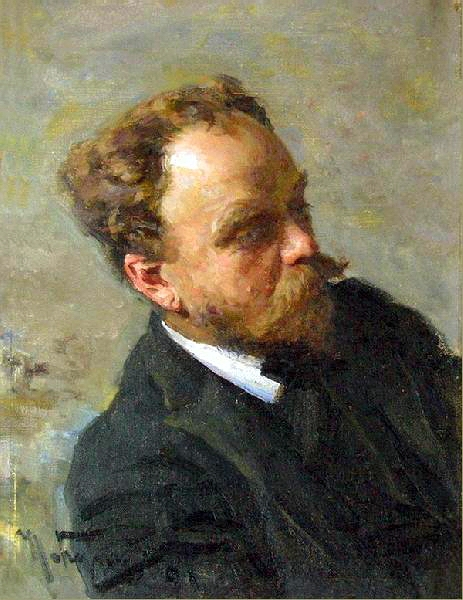
Nikolai Skadovsky, 1891

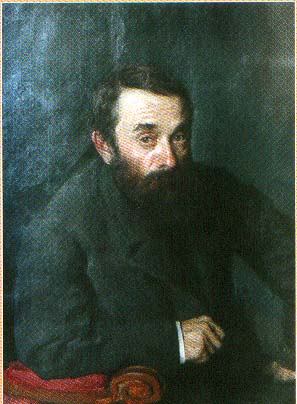
Gennady Ladyzhensky, 1894

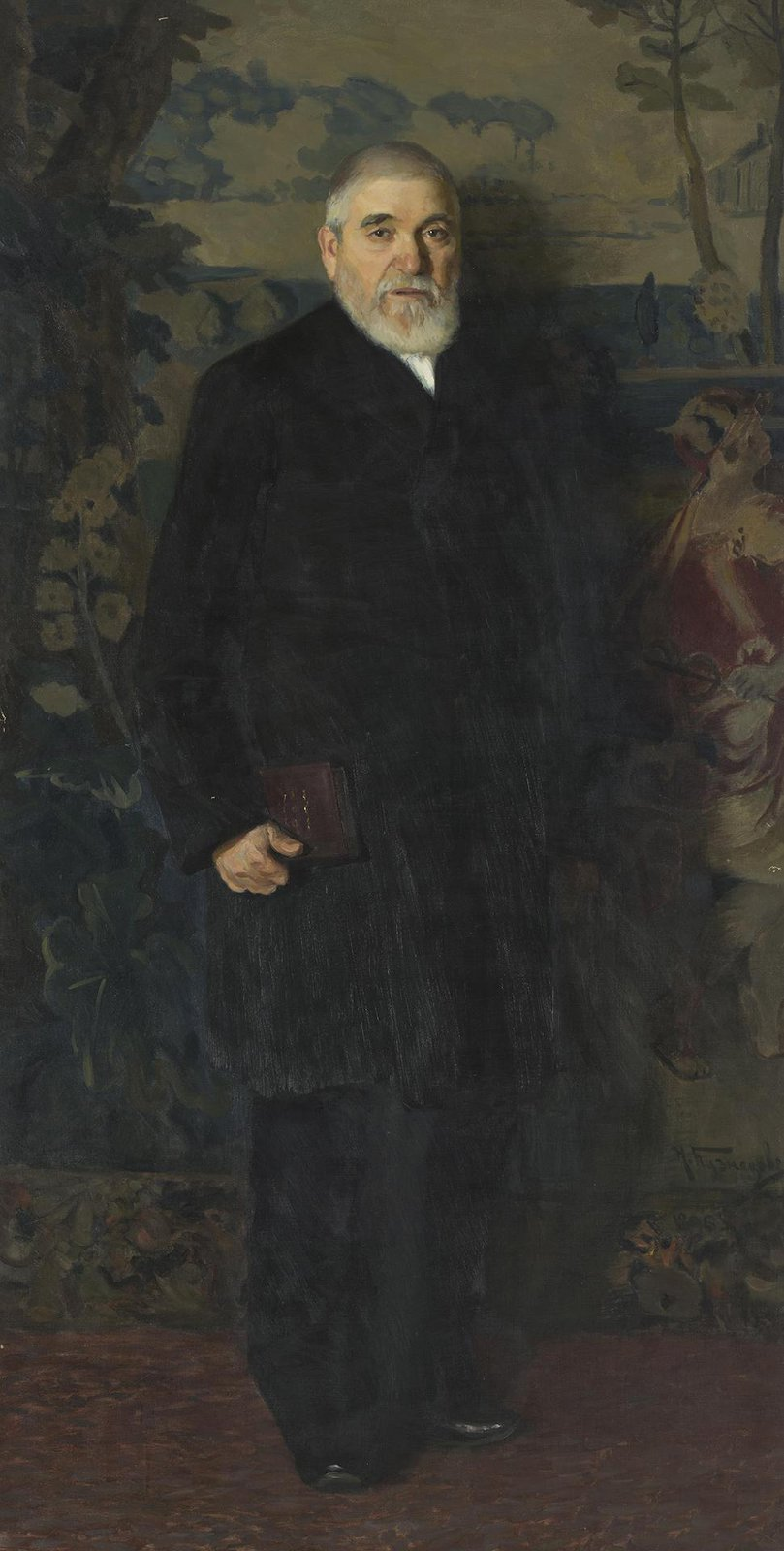
Kalman Ze'ev Wissotzky, 1896

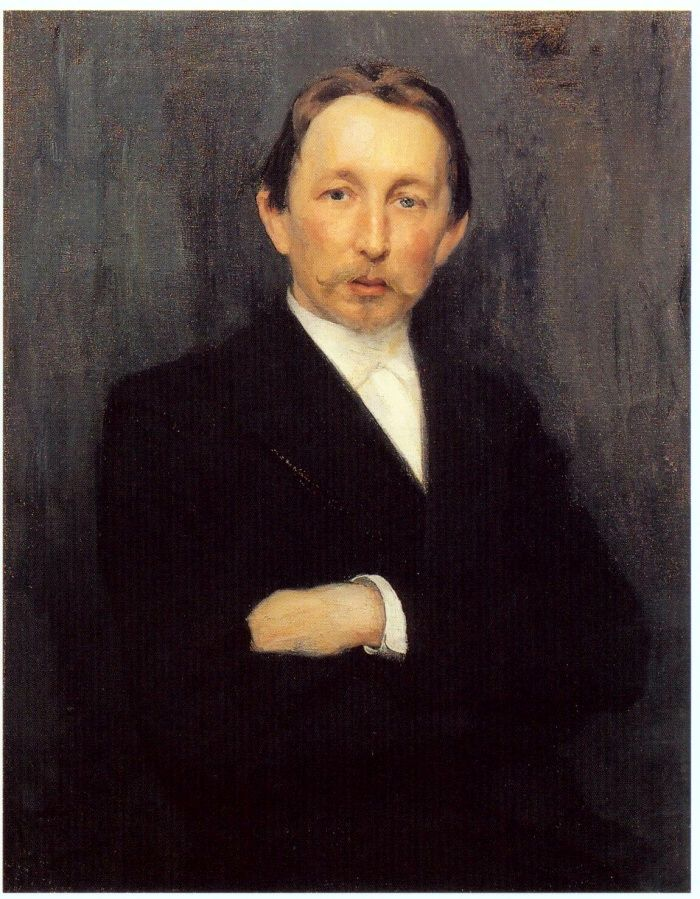
Apollinary Vasnetsov, 1897

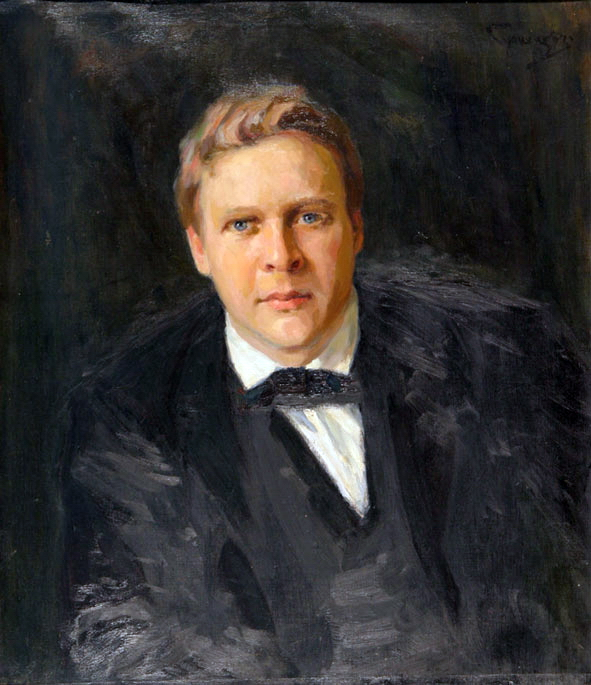
Fyodor Chaliapin, 1902

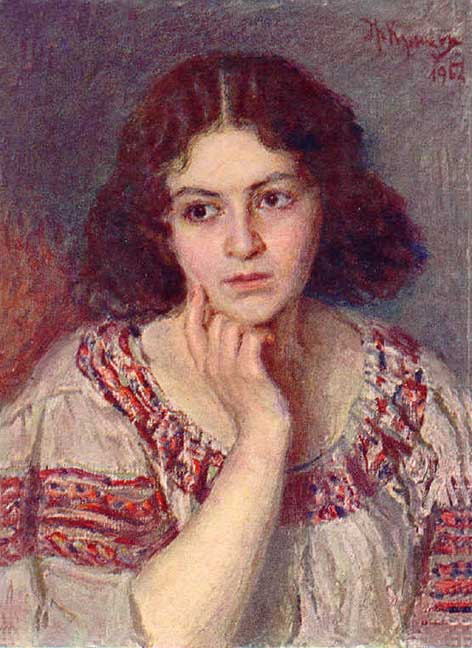
Mariya Kuznetsova-Benois, the painter's daughter, as Mariya Kochubey in Tchaikovsky's Mazeppa, 1907
Genre paintings

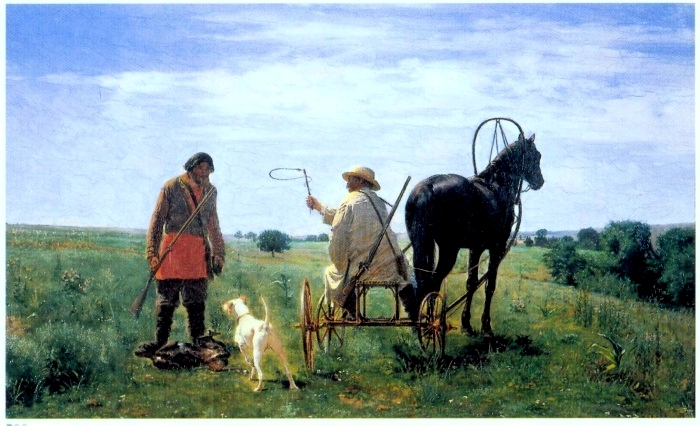
Touring the Property, 1879

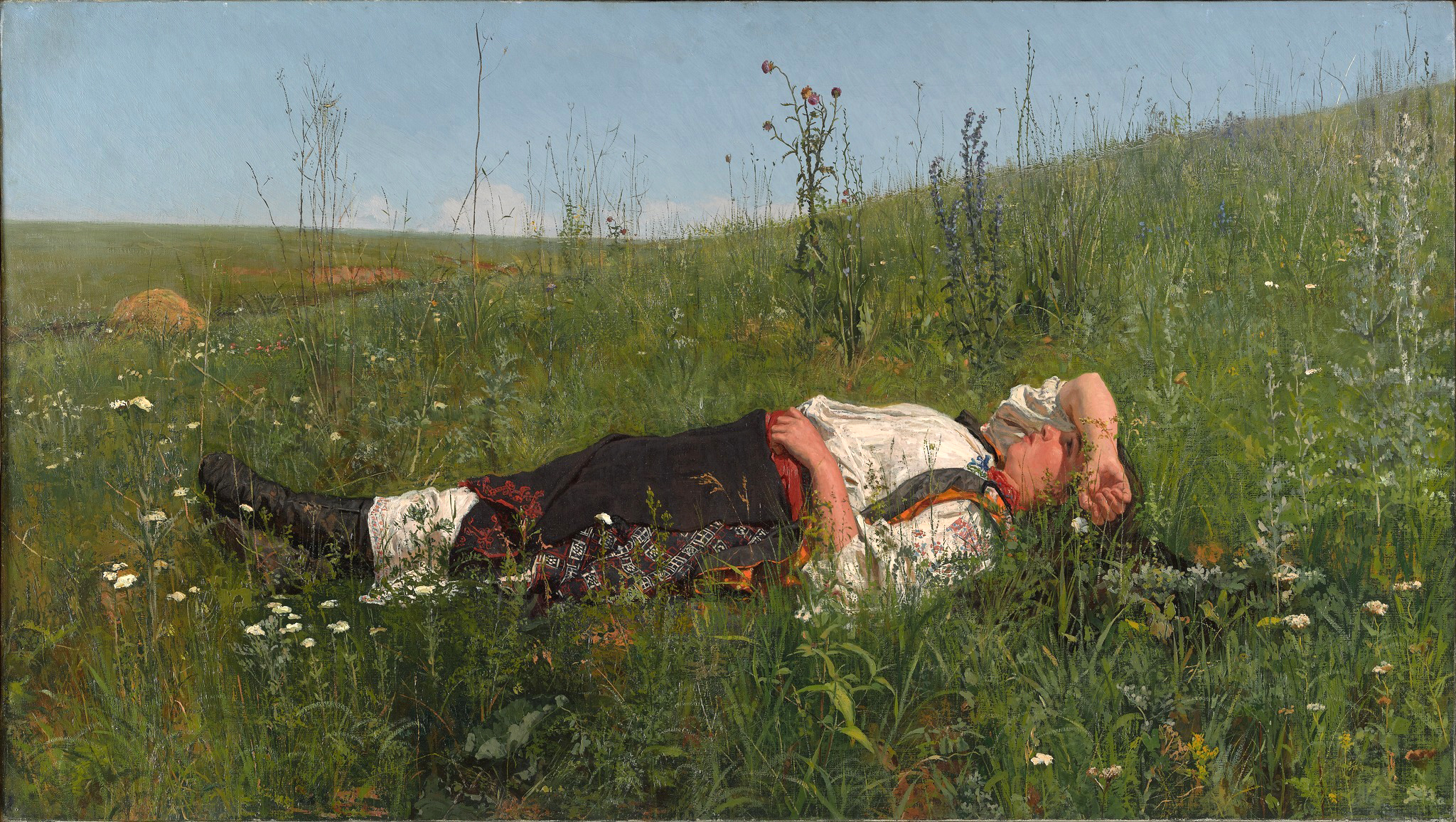
On Holiday, 1879—1881

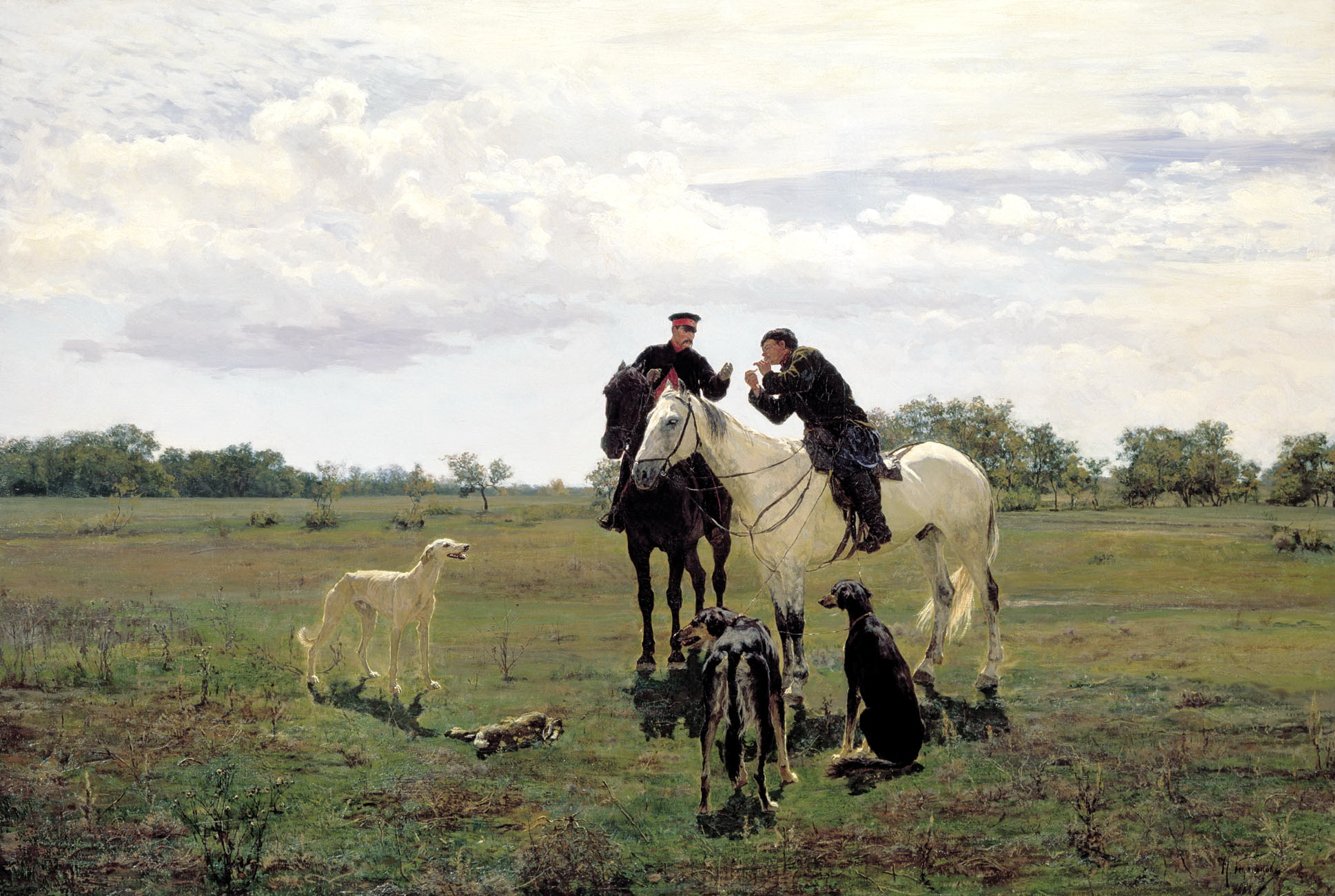
On Leave, 1882

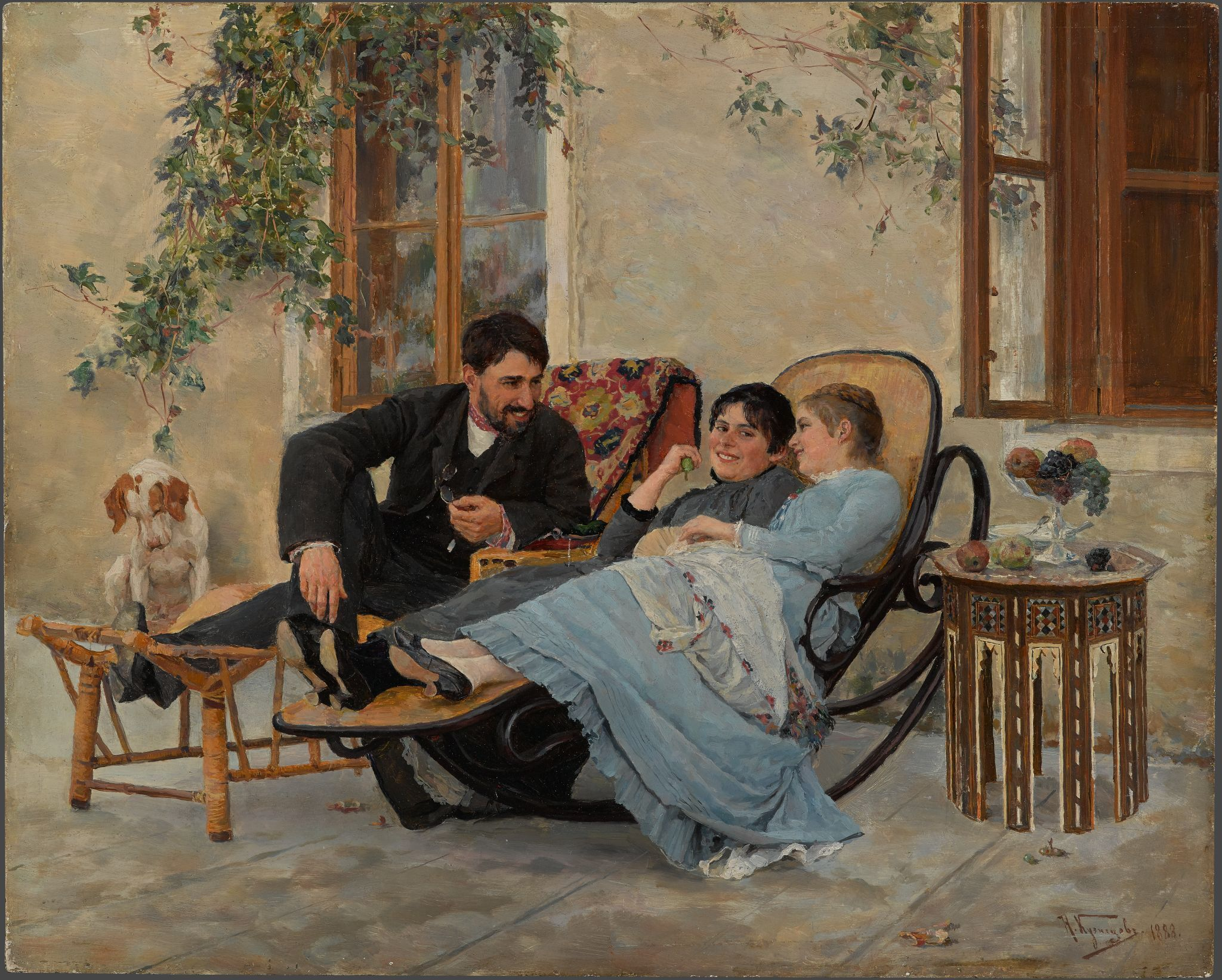
After-Dinner Conversation, 1888

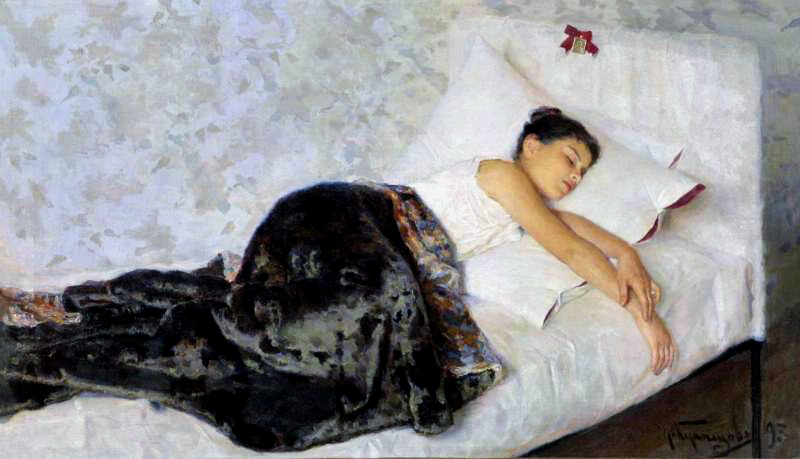
Sleeping Girl, 1893
