= Mariya Kuznetsova (singer) =

Russian opera singer (1880–1966)

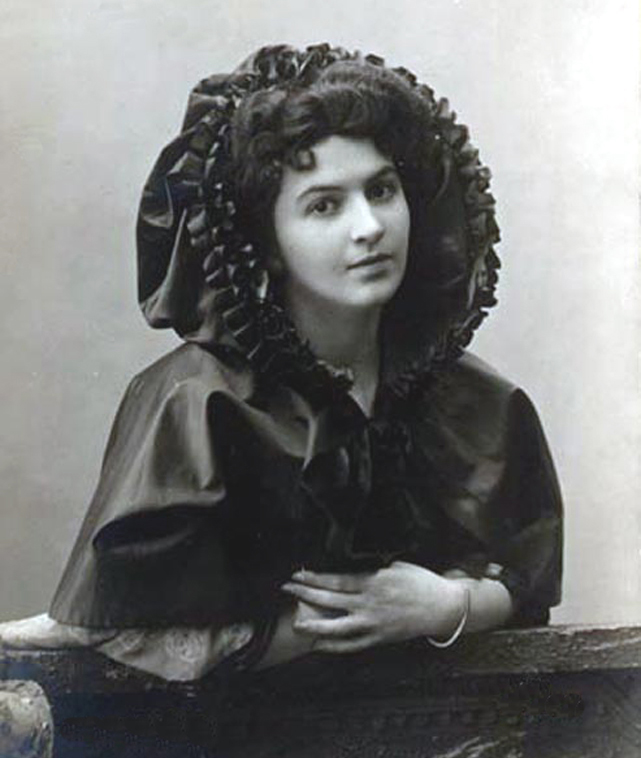
Maria Kuznetsova

Maria Nikolaevna Kuznetsova (Russian: Мария Николаевна Кузнецова; 22 July [O.S. 10 July] 1880 – 25 April 1966), also known as Maria Kuznetsova-Benois, was a Russian opera singer and dancer.

Prior to the Revolution of 1917, Kuznetsova was one of the most celebrated opera singers in Russia, having worked with Richard Strauss, Nikolai Rimsky-Korsakov and Jules Massenet. She was frequently paired with Feodor Chaliapin. After leaving Russia in 1917, Kuznetsova continued to perform for another thirty years abroad before retiring.

== Family ==
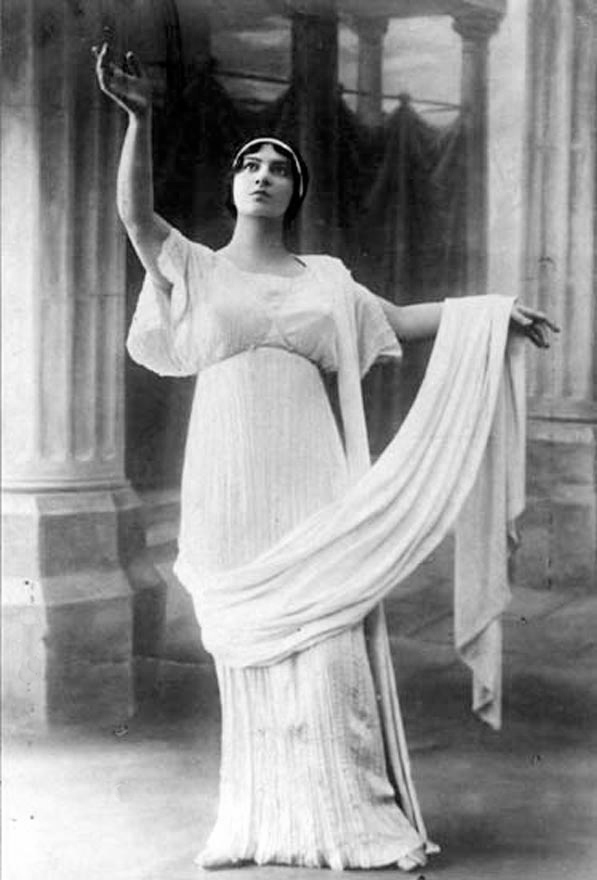
Maria Kuznetsova as Fausta

Kuznetsova was born in 1880, in Odessa, the eldest of three children to the portraitist Nikolai Dmitriyevich Kuznetsov.

== Early life and career ==
Kuznetsova initially studied ballet in Saint Petersburg, Russia, but abandoned dancing to study music with the baritone Joachim Tartakov. Kuznetsova was a lyrical soprano with a clear and beautiful singing voice. She also possessed notable talent as an actress. Igor Stravinsky described her as "very appetizing to look at as well as to hear".

She initially debuted at the Saint Petersburg Conservatory as Tatiana in Tchaikovsky's Eugene Onegin in 1904. Kuznetsova debuted for a second time in 1905 at the Mariinsky Theatre as Marguérite in Charles Gounod's Faust. One night, not long after her Mariinsky debut, a dispute erupted in the theater's lobby between students and army officers while Kuznetsova was singing the role of Elsa in Wagner's Lohengrin. Before panic ensued, an unfazed Kuznetsova interrupted the performance, and she then quickly calmed the crowd by leading everyone in a rousing rendition of the Russian national anthem God Save The Tsar!.

She remained at the Mariinsky as soloist for twelve years until the Revolution in 1917. During her lengthy career, Kuznetsova originated several roles including Fevroniya in Rimsky-Korsakov's The Legend of the Invisible City of Kitezh and the Maiden Fevroniya, the title role in Massenet's Cléopâtre, Woglinde in the first Russian production of Wagner's Das Rheingold and Fausta in another Massenet creation, Roma. Other signature roles included Oksana in Tchaikovsky's Cherevichki, Thaïs in Massenet's Thaïs, Violetta in Verdi's La traviata, The Snow Maiden in Rimsky-Korsakov's The Snow Maiden, Mimi in Puccini's La bohème, Antonida in Glinka's A Life for the Tsar, Lyudmila in Ruslan and Ludmila and Tamara in Anton Rubinstein's The Demon.

Kuznetsova, eventually, developed a sizable following abroad; making her Paris Opera debut in 1908 and her London debut at Covent Garden in 1909. During this period, she appeared in Emmanuel Chabrier's Gwendoline (1910) and Jules Massenet's Roma (1912). In 1916, Kuznetsova made her American debut, performing in New York and Chicago. In New York she caused a sensation, performing with the Manhattan Opera Company in the first American production of Cleopatre.

== The Ballets Russes ==
On the eve of the First World War, Kuznetsova participated in, and helped to finance, the famed Les Saisons Russes of Sergei Diaghilev's Ballets Russes in London and Paris.

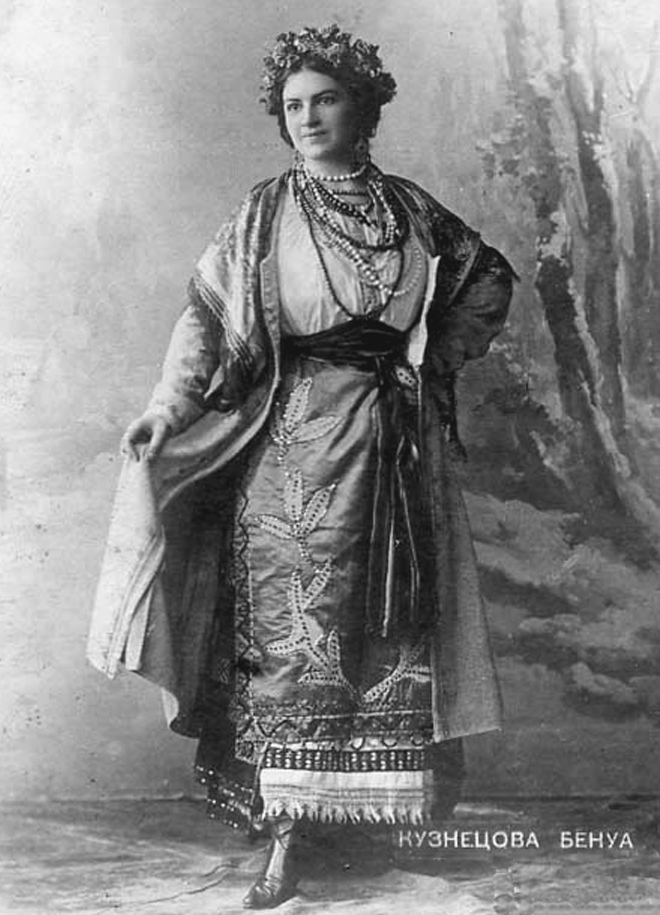
Maria Kuznetsova in Russian peasant costume

With the help of her friend, the artist and designer Léon Bakst, Kuznetsova won the role of Potiphar's wife in Richard Strauss's ballet La Légende de Joseph (or Josephslegende) in 1914. The production included a veritable who's who of the Edwardian art world. It was produced by Diaghilev, composed and conducted by Strauss, choreographed by Michel Fokine, designed by Bakst and José Maria Sert, while the lead was danced by Léonide Massine.

It was an important role, and she was certainly in good company, but they were held to a punishing schedule with little time to rehearse. To make matters worse, Strauss was in a foul mood because his lover, Ida Rubinstein, who was to have danced Lydia Sokolova's role, had abruptly abandoned the project. Furthermore, Strauss abhorred working with French musicians, and was constantly at daggers drawn with the orchestra. Diaghilev, meanwhile, had not yet recovered from Vaslav Nijinsky's departure the previous year from the Ballets Russes.

Despite the problems backstage and an outraged British press, who found the work obscene, the ballet successfully debuted in both London and Paris that spring as reported in The New York Times:

PARIS, May 14 – At the Opera tonight the Russian ballet season opened with the premiere of Richard Strauss's "The Legend of St. Joseph."...

The part of Joseph was excellently performed by a young member of the Moscow "Artists Theatre", Leonide Miassine, who joined M. Diaghilew's ballet company for this purpose. Mme Kousnetzoff abandoned singing for the time being to impersonate Potiphar's wife ...

A crowded house was evidently highly pleased.

The most memorable thing about the production was said to be Sert's luxurious Venetian themed sets and Bakst's costumes. Sokolova recalled Kuznetsova's costume as being particularly inspired:

She moved about on high gilded clogs, attended by servants, two of whom had a couple of honey-coloured wolfhounds on white leads ...

In addition to trying her hand at ballet, Kuznetsova performed in several operas that season. In one memorable performance she joined the celebrated Russian bass Feodor Chaliapin in a production of Borodin's Prince Igor, choreographed by Fokine, and staged at Drury Lane on June 8, 1914.

== Life in exile ==
After the Revolution in 1917, Kuznetsova fled Russia, making a suitably dramatic escape dressed as a cabin boy and hidden inside a steamer trunk aboard a ship headed for Sweden. Her first performance in exile was with the Stockholm Opera in 1919.

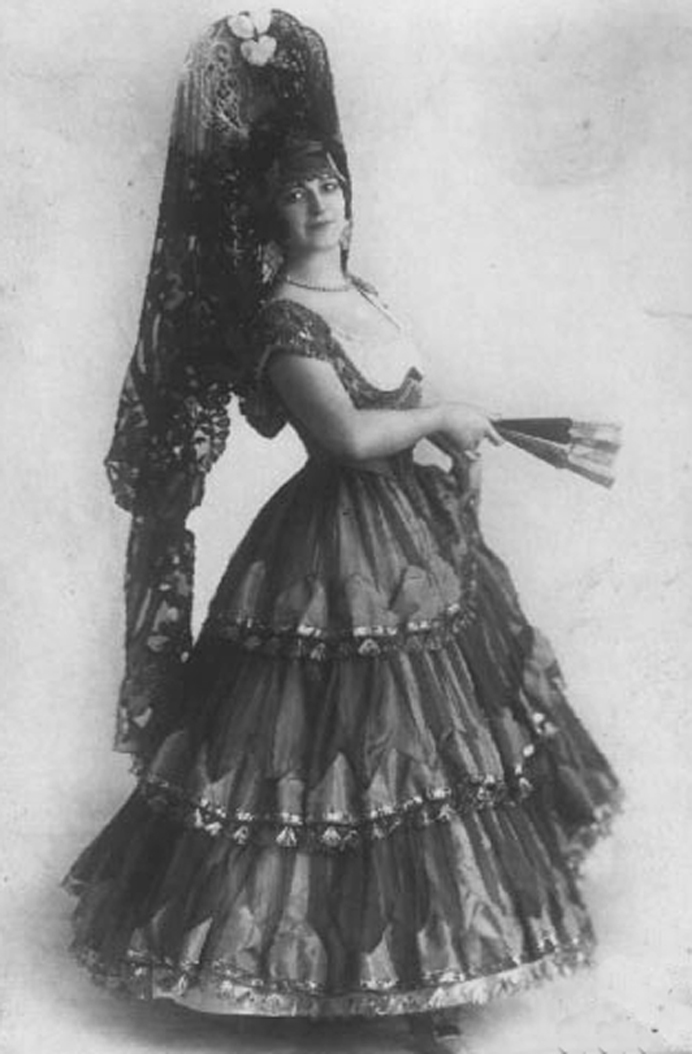
Maria Kuznetsova in Spanish costume

Later that year, she was engaged at the Gaiété-Lyrique in Paris, singing alongside Lucien Fugère, Maria Barrientos, Lydia Lipkowska, Georgette Leblanc, André Gilly, and Vanni Marcoux.

In 1920, Kuznetsova participated in a large a charity concert at the Paris Opéra along with Vera Karalli and others, to raise funds to aid impoverished fellow Russian émigrés.

Kuznetsova's other performances during the 1920s were of a more practical and less philanthropic nature. She organized private concerts and recitals where she would sing Russian and Spanish folk music, Gypsy music, and opera. At these recitals she would often perform Spanish folk dances and Flamenco after singing. In addition to these private performances, Kuznetsova worked as a soloist at Covent Garden, the Copenhagen Opera House, and other theaters and opera houses throughout Europe. She founded the Theatre of Miniatures with Léon Bakst in 1922, where, for a very brief time, she performed.

In 1927, with the help of the Ukrainian baritone Mikhail Karakash and his wife Elizaveta Popova, and of the Count Alexis Ceretelli, Kuznetsova founded the Opéra Russe à Paris. The Opéra Russe staged a number of ballets and operas in London, Paris, Barcelona, Madrid, Milan, and as far afield as Buenos Aires, and Japan, between 1927 and 1933. She also concerted in Shanghai in May 1935.

Kuznetsova gave fewer performances after 1933, but as late as 1947 her name appeared on the program of a choreographic competition held in Copenhagen, hosted by Rolf de Maré. Her contribution to the event was described quite simply: "Songs and dances of Spain, by Maria Kousnetzoff and a flamenco group."

== Personal life and death ==
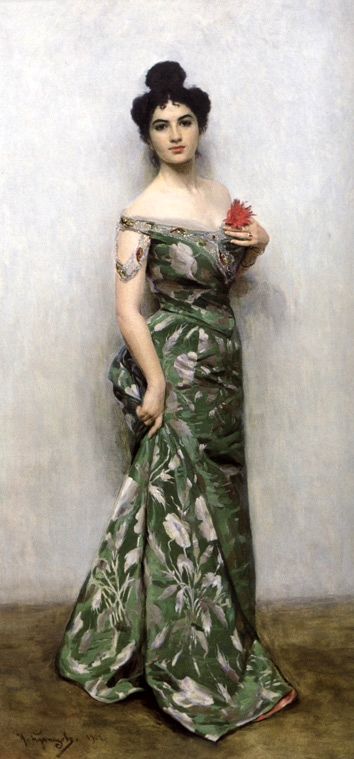
Portrait of Mariya Kuznetsova-Benois by her father (1901)

Kuznetsova's first husband was Albert Albertovich Benois, the son of watercolorist Albert Nikolayevich Benois (1852–1936).

After the death of Benois, Kuznetsova wed Jules Massenet's nephew, the banker and industrialist Alfred Massenet. Alfred had worked for a time in the Russian Empire, prior to the Revolution, as the president of the Société d'Industrie Minière de Chagali-Heliar, a French copper mining company headquartered in Tbilisi, Georgia.

Kuznetsova's last years were spent in poverty; she lived in one room in a small hotel off the Champs Elysees, abandoned by her son Mikhael and her former colleagues and friends. Kuznetsova's sole companion was her dresser Olga and she supported herself by giving lessons in singing and acting. Olga used to recount how Chaliapin died in Kuznetsova's arms, against the wishes of his wife.

Kuznetsova died in Paris on April 25, 1966, aged eighty-two; she's been interred into the Sainte-Geneviève-des-Bois Cemetery.
