= Mariya Nzigiyimana =

Burundian midwife and Quaker

Mariya Nzigiyimana (born c. 1934) is a Burundian midwife and Quaker. She was married to the teacher and activist Abel Binyoni.

== Life ==
Mariya Nzigiyimana was born in Kibimba, Burundi. She was the first girl in central Burundi to complete primary education. After she trained as a midwife, she was the first woman in central Burundi to work professionally. In 1960 she married the Quaker teacher and activist Abel Binyoni, continuing to work as a midwife. In 1968 she became presiding clerk of the Women of the Friends Church, the women's meeting of Burundi Yearly Meeting.
