= Mariia Kushnirchuk =

Ukrainian nationalist military woman (1926–2005)

- Марія Кушнірчук
- Born: 27 June 1926; Młodiatyn, Stanisławów Voivodeship, Poland (now Molodiatyn, Ukraine)
- Died: 14 June 2005 (aged 78); Kolomyia, Ivano-Frankivsk Oblast, Ukraine
- Citizenship: Poland; Soviet Union; Ukraine
- Years active: 1944–1947 (as a member of OUN)
- Known for: Volunteer and liaison officer; victim of Soviet labour camps
- Spouse: Ivan Proshak (died 1999)
- Children: 2, including Olesia

Mariia Mykolaivna Kushnirchuk (Ukrainian: Марія Миколаївна Кушнірчук; 27 June 1926 – 14 June 2005) was a Ukrainian volunteer and liaison officer of the Ukrainian Insurgent Army and a victim of Soviet (1947–1954) camps. She was a wife of the public nationalist figure and OUN veteran Ivan Proshak.

== Biography ==
Mariia Kushnirchuk was born on 27 June 1926 in the village of Molodiatyn to mixed Polish-Ukrainian family. Her mother, Wanda Rybczyk, was a Polish origin and born in the village of Sloboda-Rungurska (1909–1992). Her father, Mykola Kushnirchuk (1903–1945), was a member of the Soviet Army during the Second World War, held the rank of soldier, and died on 27 April 1945, during the Battle of Berlin.

From 1934 to 1941, she studied at a rural school, where the class teacher was Justyna Shukhevych, a representative of the Shukhevych family.

During the German occupation of Ukraine, when the Nazi authorities actively deported Ukrainian girls to work in Germany, Mariia was forced to change her birth year to 1928 instead of 1926, so that she would not be suitable for hard labor in another country.

In autumn 1944, she joined the Ukrainian Insurgent Army. Then she was appointed a food collector for the OUN branch of Molodyatyn, without giving any pseudonym – in fact, she became a volunteer. During 1944–1945, Mariia was able to collect 15 kg of bread and 10 liters of milk – the collection was held twice at that time. Also, in her house, UPA soldiers hid from the NKVD invasion in groups of 4–5 people. During the winter, as the NKVD investigation established, she twice participated in the meeting, ruled by, "Skala", where the fighting against the Soviet occupiers was discussed.

Apparently, because of this activity, she was detained twice by the NKVD: one detention took place in May 1945: then she was held for three days, and the investigator admitted to the suspect that he had allegedly mistakenly detained and released Mariia Kushnirchuk. In December of the same year, the Soviet secret services took Mariia into custody for the second time. Investigator Chkalov began to severely beat her and charged her with supplying food to UPA soldiers. She was held for a month until Mariia told everything to the prosecutor – only then was she released.

Later, in early 1946, due to the recommendations of Paraskeva Zhupnyk, Mariia began to perform the duties of a UPA liaison between the villages of Molodyatyn and Chorny Potik. At that time, she maintained contact with the platoon of the commander of company "Spartan" – "Shablya", to which she transmitted all intelligence data. But again in October she was detained by the NKVD, again she was severely tortured, held for 10 days and released.

On 30 June 1947, a warrant for the arrest of Maria Kushnirchuk was issued. On 2 July, at 11 p.m., a search was conducted — nothing was found then. At night, Maria was sent to the penitentiary of the district department of the Ministry of Internal Affairs in Pechenizhyn and all her property was seized. On 4 July, she was interrogated at the district department of the NKVD, and then a warrant for her arrest was issued under Articles 54-1 and 54-2 of the Criminal Code of the Ukrainian SSR. Then she was sent to Kolomyia, where she was brutally tortured during five-hour interrogations on 16 August 1947, during which she did not confess to her activities as a liaison. While in the NKVD prison, she witnessed the torture of UPA military woman Melaniia Yavorska, under the pseudonym "Tisa", who was severely beaten.

On 5 September 1947, the head of the NKVD of the Stanislav region, Krutov, proposed sending the case to a Special Meeting of the USSR MGB and sentencing her to 10 years in labor camps and 5 years of deprivation of rights with confiscation of property. On 29 October, it decided to sentence Mariia Kushnirchuk to 8 years in labor camps, starting from 1 July 1947. Then she was to be sent to the Ust-Vymsk labor camp for logging.

Maria Kushnirchuk was first transported to Moscow, and from there to the village of Knyazhpogost, 140 km from Syktyvkar, where the aforementioned camp was located, and only in the early 1950s was she sent to Vorkuta. She remained in the camps until 22 November 1954, when she was released early. She was left in the Vorkuta special settlement, from where she was released on 5 May 1956.

In the mid-1950s, she married Ivan Proshak and, for the first time since her arrest, traveled to her native village of Molodiatyn to visit her relatives.

During the Khrushchev thaw, she made attempts to rehabilitate herself by writing a petition to the Prosecutor General of the USSR on 24 December 1955. After that, all former participants in the underground struggle, fellow villagers, and her mother Wanda Kushnirchuk were interrogated. However, some fellow villagers confirmed Ms. Maria's participation in the UPA during interrogations, so the KGB Department of the Stanislav Region refused rehabilitation on 14 October 1957.

After the decisive refusal, Maria Kushnirchuk could no longer pursue higher education, as she remained an "enemy of the people", so she was forced to work as a kitchen assistant and a kindergarten janitor in Vorkuta.

Maria Kushnirchuk lived in Vorkuta until December 1977 – then Ivan Proshak built a house on Zatyshna Street and moved to Kolomyia – that's when Maria Kushnirchuk started living there. She wanted to work at the woodworking plant in the chair shop until she retired, but because of her biography they didn't want to hire her until her husband intervened – only after that was she accepted. She worked there until 1981, when she became a pensioner.

Then, on 16 May 1991, she wrote another request to the prosecutor of the Ivano-Frankivsk region, Orest Martyniuk, asking for justification for her struggle for the freedom of Ukraine. On 15 August, 9 days before the restoration of Ukrainian independence, she finally received rehabilitation.

In the 1990s, she was a member of the Congress of Ukrainian Nationalists and the All-Ukrainian Society of Political Prisoners and Repressed People, but was not as active as her husband.

Maria Kushnirchuk died, just 13 days shy of her 79th birthday, on 14 June 2005, in Kolomyia, where she was buried.

== Memory ==
In May 2026, a book "To the Memory of the Unbroken Couple", where Mariia Kushnirchuk is one of main characters, was published. On 4 June, this book was represented by local historian Illya Kryvoruchko.
