= Mariya Vernadskaya =

Russian political economist (1831–1860)

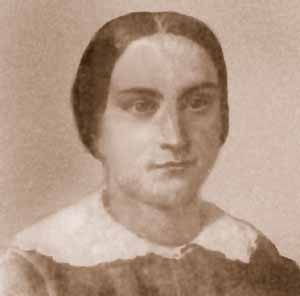

Mariya Nikolaevna Vernadskaya (née Shigaeva, 1831–1860) was a Russian economist who championed women entering the workforce. She is often cited as the first Russian woman political economist.

She was born on 27 December 1831, in St Petersberg to government official Nikolai Petrovich Shigaev. Her mother died when she was young, and she was educated at home.

In 1850, she married professor and economist I. V. Vernadsky. They had a son, Nikolai.

Mariya began studying economics and made several translations of economic works into Russian. From 1857, Mariya and her husband co-edited a liberal journal, The Economic Index.

In the 1850s, Mariya wrote about 25 articles and 80 book reviews in the field of economics, many of them in her own journal. She was in favour of liberating serfs without land and of the independence that could come to women entering the workforce. Her articles, which sometimes took unconventional, short-story like formats, encouraged women not to see employment as shameful.

She died of tuberculosis in 1860, after which her husband published her collected writings in 1862.
