= Mariia Dilai =

Ukrainian artist (born 1980)

- Марія Ділай
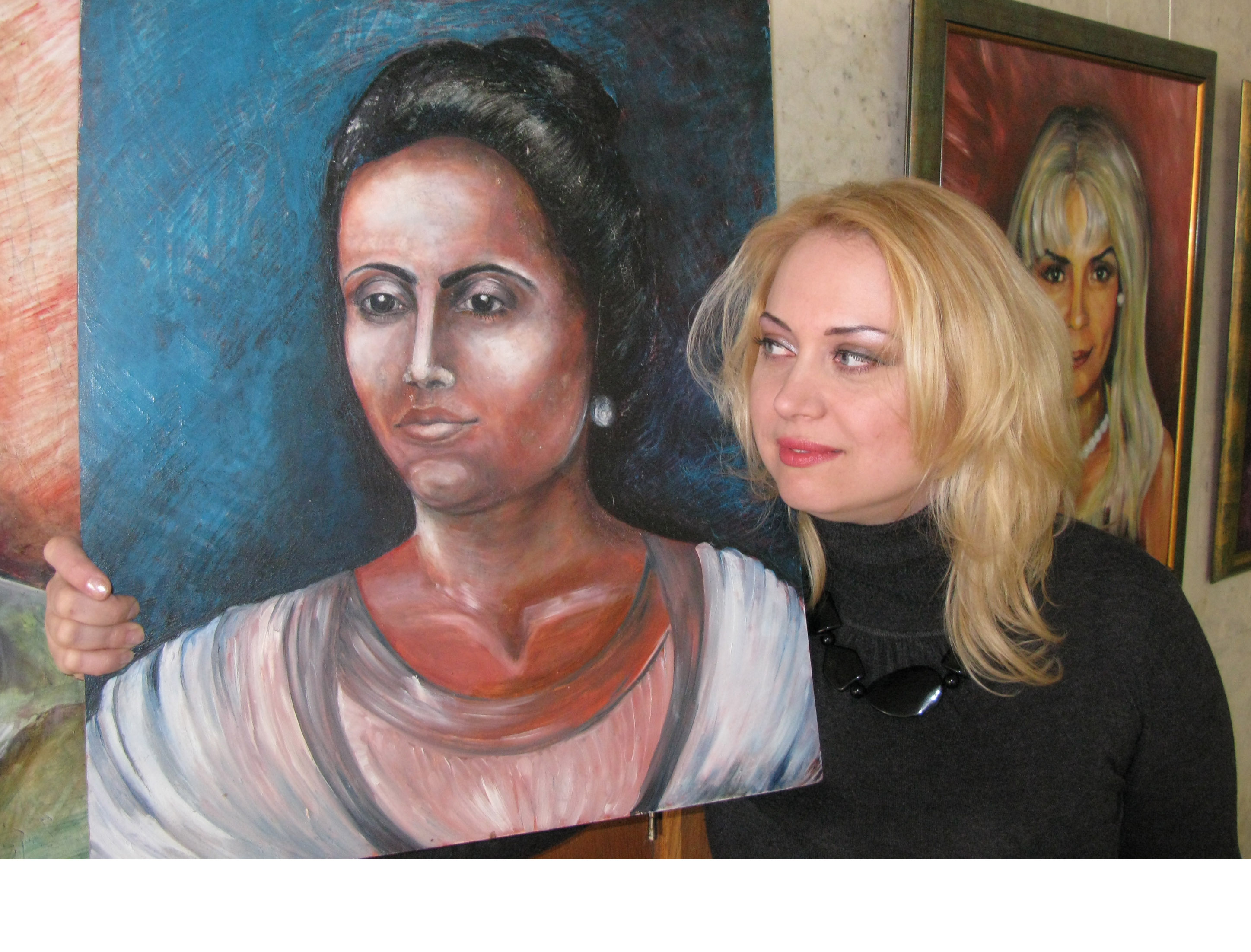
- Artist Mariia Dilai with her portrait of Solomiya Krushelnytska
- Born: Mariia Mykhailivna Dilai; 7 April 1980 (age 46); Ternopil
- Education: Ternopil Cooperative College, Kyiv Institute of Advertising, Open International University of Human Development "Ukraine"
- Occupation: Painting

Mariia Mykhailivna Dilai (Ukrainian: Марія Михайлівна Ділай; born 7 April 1980 in Ternopil) is a Ukrainian artist, designer, and social activist.

== Biography ==
She graduated from Ternopil Secondary School No. 27, Ternopil Cooperative College (2001, majoring in art and design), Kyiv Institute of Advertising (2004), and Open International University of Human Development "Ukraine" (2014, majoring in art and design of the architectural environment). She worked as a lecturer at the Department of Painting and Drawing at the College of the International University of Ukraine and at the "Classics" private children's development school.

She lived in the city of Málaga (Spain). She opposes domestic psychological and physical violence.

== Creativity ==
She worked in a studio with artist Ivan Marchuk.

She has had personal exhibitions in Ternopil (2009, 2011, 2014, 2020, 2021), Málaga (2019, Spain).

She created a gallery of portraits of Bohdan Melnychuk, Viktor Pavlyk, Dmytro Vyshnevetskyi, Ihor Gereta, Ihor Mamus, Ihor Pelykh, Ivan Pulliuy, Ivan Franko, Johann Georg Pinsel, Lesya Ukrainka, Les Kurbas, Muammar Gaddafi (the only portrait of him that disappeared), Roman Shukhevych, Solomiya Krushelnytska, and Serhii Lazo.

In 2018, she painted a prophetic painting depicting a woman wearing a mask.

Some of the artist's paintings are in private collections in the UK, Poland and other countries.

== Sources ==
- Ефект сфумато, або Що спільного у тернополянки Марії Ділай із Леонардо да Вінчі, Нова Тернопільська газета, 29.07.2009, S. 5.
- Заморська, Л. "Люблю речі, до яких треба тягнутися", 20 хвилин, 04.08.2009, S. 10.
- Смільська, О. Марія Ділай мріє писати портрети президентів, а не знедолених, Нова Тернопільська газета, 26.04.2011, S. 12.
- Петрів, Н. Марія Ділай: "Не можу малювати знедолених людей", Свобода, 15.03.2013, S. 8, (Зустрічі без прощань).
- Деркач, З. Вважають, її картини руйнують замки, Місто, 15.05.2013, S. 10, (Цікаві знайомства).
- Єдина в Україні жінка-портретист Марія Ділай створила унікальну галерею відомих земляків, TernoTravel, 2011, S. 28.
- Заморська, Л. Малює, як Леонардо да Вінчі, 20 хвилин, 14.08.2009, S. 14.
- Заморська, Л. Марія Ділай мріє малювати президентів, 20 хвилин, 30.08.2009, S. 4.
- Кубацька, Н. Пензель не обманює, він дарує вічність, Свобода, 31.08.2009, S. 8, (Життя на полотні).
- Ліхута, Л. "…Немов стоїш на вершині великої гори і зараз злетиш", Вільне життя плюс, 08.04.2011, S. 1, (Вернісаж у редакції).
- Ноженко, І. Марія Ділай пише портрети у техніці сфумато, 20 хвилин, 02.03.2011, S. 22, (Афіша).
- Мурашка, З. Марія Ділай: "Бог заклав дар до малювання, а життя довершило", Вільне життя плюс, 03.03.2017, S. 3, (Особистості).
- Волинська, О. Як письменник художниці долю передбачив, Вільне життя плюс, 10.02.2017, S. 8, (Невигадане).
