= Mariya Vasilieva =

Russian legal academic (born 1963)

Mariya Vasilieva (Russian: Мария Васильева; 2 January 1963) is a doctor of Juridical Science, Professor of the Department of Environmental and Land Law of Lomonosov Moscow State University Faculty of Law. She was born in the Lipetsk region on January 2, 1963.

== Education ==
She entered the Faculty of Law of Kalinin State University in 1980 and graduated with honors in 1986.

She studied full-time at the graduate school of Lomonosov Moscow State University Faculty of Law in the Department of Environmental and Land Law from 1987 to 1990. She defended the candidate’s dissertation on “Citizens’ Right to a Healthy Environment in the USSR” (thesis supervisor – Prof. V.V. Petrov) on November 30, 1990. The defense took place at the Faculty of Law of Lomonosov Moscow State University. Vasilieva was awarded the academic title of associate professor by the decision of the Ministry of Education of the Russian Federation on February 18, 1998.

She studied towards higher doctorate at the Faculty of Law of Lomonosov Moscow State University in the Department of Environmental and Land Law from 2000 to 2003. She defended the doctoral thesis on “Public Interest in Environmental Law” on June 16, 2003. The defense took place at the Faculty of Law of Lomonosov Moscow State University. Vasilieva was awarded the academic title of Doctor of Juridical Science by the decision of the Higher Attestation Commission of the Russian Federation Ministry of Education and Science on November 21, 2003.

Vasilieva worked at the Faculty of Law of Tver State University as associate professor from September 1, 1990, to October 31, 2000.

She has been a professor at the Faculty of Law of Moscow State University since September 1, 2003, giving the following lecture courses: “Land Law” (since 2003), “Environmental Law” (since 2003), and a special course “Energy Law” (with P. Lahno, I. Ignateva, G. Volkov and D. Haustov).

She undertook an internship at Amsterdam University, the University of Osnabrück, the University of Bath, and completed the Open World Program for young Russian leaders.

Vasilieva is actively engaged in teaching activities. She has been leading the Environmental and Land Society of Lawyers (AESOP, Student Research Society of the Department of Environmental and Land Law) for eight years with Olga Kozyr, candidate of juridical sciences and associate professor.

At present, Vasilieva is a member of Lomonosov Moscow State University Dissertation Council (Faculty of Law), a member of the environmental law section of the Legal Education Board, an editorial board member for several legal and economic periodicals, deputy chairman of the Center For Environmental Policy and Culture, all-Russian non-government organization, and a member of the Center for Russian Environmental Policy.

== Present posts and projects ==
At different times she was a member and expert of the Supreme Environmental Council at the Russian Federation State Duma Committee on Natural Resources, Environmental Management and Ecology, as well as an expert of the Russian Federation Civic Chamber Commission for Environmental Policy and Protection. She took part in developing and examining a number of federal and regional acts of legislation as an expert and a member of working groups.

She participated in developing the basic draft of the General Part of the Russian Federation Environmental Code in 2006 and 2007, and the basic draft of the Special Part of the Russian Federation Environmental Code in 2007 and 2008.

Vasilieva is the author of the draft concepts and text of the Federal Law “On Compensation for the Damage Caused to Public Health by the Negative Effect of Environment” and the draft of the Russian Federation entity model law “On Environmental Protection.” She is also a member of several environmental protection research projects implemented by the Center for Russian Environmental Policy, the United Nations Environment Programme, the World Wildlife Fund, and other organizations. Vasilieva was awarded the medal For Protection of Russian Nature and the honorary title Green Person of the Year of 2001 for personal contribution to protection of environmental rights of citizens and public interests. She is acknowledged by the Russian Federation Public Chamber.

== Publication ==
Vasilieva is the author of more than 160 academic papers, including six monographs on protection of citizens’ environmental rights and public interests, state environmental policy formation and implementation problems, organization of state administration in the field of environmental protection, issues of environmental legislation development in the Russian Federation entities, commentaries to the federal law “On Environmental Protection,” the Russian Federation Land Code (co-authorship) and Forestry Code (co-authorship), as well as study guides and research papers. Selected papers:

- “Public Right to Access to Natural Resources” (general theoretical and inter-industry rationale) // Russian law magazine. 2012. # 3. P. 5–14;
- “Exercising Civil Rights in the Field of Environmental Protection and Natural Resource Use: Analysis Methodology” // International and National Legal Regulation of Environment as a Sector of Society: collection of articles. – М.: The Institute of Legislation and Comparative Law, 2011. P. 100–117;
- “Special Part of Environmental Law as an Object for Codification” // Environmental law. 2010. # 6.
- Natural Resource Factors of Energy in the Russian Legislation” // Environmental law. 2010. # 1.
- “Industrial Differentiation of Legal Regulation of Land Relations in the Context of Civil Legislation Development” // Economy and law. 2010. # 3. P. 31–45;
- “Priority Directions of Legal Groundwork for Environmental Policy” (Chapter 2 “Law”) // Priorities of the Russian National Environmental Policy / Edited by V.M. Zakharova – М.: Institute for Sustainable Development/Center for Russian Environmental Policy, 2009. С. 45–131;
- “Subjects of Environmental Law Relations” // The Moscow University Herald. Series 11 “Law”. 2009. # 5. P. 3–27;
- Commentary to the Russian Federation Land Code Chapter XVII on the “Lands of Specially Protected Territories and Objects” // Commentary to the Russian Federation Land Code / Editor in chief – Prof. S. N. Volkov. – М.: Justiceinform, 2009. P. 641–755;
- “Environmental and Information Legal Relations: Object, Subjects, Principles” // Legislation and economics. 2009. # 9 (P. 35–45), # 10;
- “State as a Subject of Environmental Law” // Environmental law. 2008. # 6. P. 2–5;
- “On Methods, Means, and Tools of Legal Regulation of Environmental Relations” // Environmental law. 2009. # 2–3. P. 56–67;
- “Concept and Content of the Organizational Framework of Environmental Protection” // Environmental law of Russia. Digest of research and practice conferences. The fifth issue. 2005–2007 / Edited by Prof. A.K. Golichenkov. – М.: Forgreifer, 2009. P. 334–342;
- “On the possibilities of Legal Regulation of Using Ecosystem Services” // Strategy of Russia. 2009. # 2. The articles can also be found at the following address: fondedin.ru;
- “Environmental Legislation and Management in Regions and Municipal Entities” // Environmental Policy and Civil Society (regional experience) / edited by V.M. Zakharova. – M.: Acropolis, Center for Environmental Policy and Culture, Center for Environmental Health, 2008. P 84–130;
- “Public Environmental Control as the Field of Interaction between Civil Society and Government” // Legal Problems of Governmental, Municipal, and Other Types of Environmental Control in Russia – М.: “Jurisprudence” PH, 2008. P. 91–99;
- “Legal Problems of Compensation for the Damage Caused to Public Health by the Negative Effect of Environment” // State and law. 2008. # 10. P. 26–36;
- “Environmental Protection Powers of Municipal Authorities: Problems of Implementation and Legal Regulation” // Constitutional and municipal law. 2008. # 19. P. 24–32;
- “Municipal Administration in the Field of Environmental Protection (Legislation and its Application)” / Edited by M.I. Vasilieva – М.: Public Chamber of the Russian Federation, 2007. – 152 p.;
- “Proposition on Setting the Regulatory and Legal Framework for Environmental Protection at Regional and Municipal Level.” – М.: Acropolis, Center for Russian Environmental Policy, 2007. – 52 p.;
- “Economic Stimulation of the Environmental Protection Activities, State and Prospects of Legal Regulation” // Economy and law. 2007. # 11. P. 52–57; 2007. # 12;
- “Citizens in Forests” // Agrarian and land law. 2007. # 9. P. 111–119;
- “Conceptual Issues of Improving Environmental Policy and Environmental Protection Legislation” // Environmental law. 2007. # 2. P. 8–18;
- “Legal Regulation of Forest Relations in the New Forestry Code of the Russian Federation” // Russian Law Magazine. 2007. # 1. P. 75–86;
- Model law “On Environmental Protection” of the Russian Federation entity // Environmental law. 2006. # 1.
- “Right to Favorable Environment as an Element of the Legal Status of an Individual” // Environmental law. 2005. # 1. P. 19–26;
- “Legal Issues of Organizing Administration in the Field of Environmental Protection.” – М.: Acropolis, Center for Russian Environmental Policy, 2004. – 254 p.;
- “Public Environmental Interests: Problems of Theory” // Environmental law. 2004. # 4. P. 12–20;
- “On Factors that Influence Teaching Environmental Law” // Environmental law. 2003. # 3. P. 36–39;
- “Environmental Interests in Politics and Law.” – М.: Center for Russian Environmental Policy, 2003. – 59 p.;
- “Public Interests in Environmental Law.” – М.: MSU Publishing House, 2003. – 424 p.;
- “On Environmental Law Consciousness (Axiological Aspects)” // Environmental law. 2002. # 3. P. 14–19;
- “On Applying Environmental Standards of Good Environmental Status in Law” // State and law. 2002. # 11. P. 84–92;
- “On Legal Directions of the National Environmental Doctrine” // Environmental law. 2002. # 1. С. 18–21;
- New development of the federal law “On Environmental Protection”: Commentary. – М.: NIA-Nature – REFIA, 2002. – 142 p.;
- “Regional Environmental Policy: Legal Aspects.” – М.: Center for Russian Environmental Policy, 2001. – 117 p.;
- “Public Environmental Interests: Legal Regulation.” – М.: Nauka, 1999. – 132 p.;
- “Environmental Civil Rights (Basic Theory): Study Guide.” – TvGU Publishing House, 1999. – 149 p.;
- “Problems of Defending the Public Interest in Environmental Law” // State and law. 1999. # 8. P. 49–62;
- Concept and structure of the federal law “On Compensation for the Damage Caused to Public Health by the Negative Effect of Environment” // Green World. 1997. # 9. P. 6–9;
- “Judicial Defense of Environmental Rights (Legal Issues of Compensation and Prevention of Environmental Damage).” – М.: Center for Russian Environmental Policy, 1996. – 217 p.;
- “Compensation for the Damage Caused to Public Health by the Negative Effect of Environment” // Zakonnost’. 1994. # 7. P. 25–32.

Professor Mariya Vasilieva, Doctor of Juridical Science, is also co-author of the Russian-German textbook “Energy Law of Russia and Germany” (Vasilyeva M. Ecologische Anforderungen an Energieanlagen (Kraftwerke und Nutze) // Handbuch zum deutsch-russischen Energierecht (Herausgegeben von Franz Jürgen Säcker) // Verlag C.H.Beck Munchen. 2011. S. 705–712). She is mentioned in 94 sources in databases of the ConsultantPlus reference system.

Mariya Vasilieva is a member of the First International Interactive Juridical Portal URISTI.TV.
