= Mariya Stepanivna Humenyuk =

Soviet politician

Mariya Stepanivna Humenyuk (Ukrainian: Марія Степанівна Гуменюк) was a Soviet politician.

Humenyuk was a member of the Supreme Council of the Soviet Union. She was born in the village of Dmytrivka, now part of the village of Grishkivtsi, Berdychiv district, Zhytomyr Oblast.
