= Olga Sholokhova =

- Native name: Ольга Митрофановна Шолохова
- Born: 11 July 1915; Borisoglebsk, Tambov Governorate, Russian Empire
- Died: 1 February 2001 (aged 85) Nizhny Novgorod, Russian Empire
- Allegiance: Soviet Union
- Branch: Soviet Air Force
- Service years: 1941–1949
- Rank: Major
- Conflicts: World War II
- Awards: Order of the Red Banner; Order of Alexander Nevsky

Olga Mitrofanovna Sholokhova (Russian: Ольга Митрофановна Шолохова; 19 July 1915 – 1 February 2001) was a deputy squadron commander in the 125th Guards Bomber Aviation Regiment and one of only nine women awarded the Order of Alexander Nevsky.

== Early life ==
Sholokhova was born on 11 July 1915 to a Russian family in Borisoglebsk. After completing her seventh year of school she attended trade school to work at a factory, but decided to seek out an aviation career, and through hard work and study she was accepted into the 3rd Balashov Joint School of Pilots and Mechanics, which she entered in 1933. Upon graduation from the school she held a certificate as a 4th class pilot and began her first flights for the civil air fleet, flying the Krasnodar line. In addition to holding a post in the city council of Rostov-on-Don, she was offered an opportunity to go to Mineralnye Vody for additional flight training in April 1941; she accepted, and gained a promotion to 2nd class pilot after completion of the courses. However, she did not remain in civil aviation for long due to the German invasion of the Soviet Union.

== World War II ==
Due to formation of the women's aviation regiments by Marina Raskova, Sholokhova was drafted into the military in December 1941. Like other members of the 587th Bomber Aviation Regiment, she underwent additional training at Engels Military Aviation School in Saratov, initially on the obsolete Su-2 bomber, before later retraining to fly the more advanced Pe-2 dive bomber. Due to the amount of training needed to fly the Pe-2, the regiment did not deploy to the frontlines until 1943. Initially posted as a flight commander, she soon began to accumulate a tally of combat sorties before being badly wounded in battle during a mission over Kuban on 2 June 1943. Flying in a squadron of nine Pe-2 dive bombers with Yevgeniya Timofeeva as squadron commander, they were soon confronted by German fighters as they approached their targets. The Soviet fighter escort fought off the first wave of German fighters, but three of the bombers were heavily damaged from anti-aircraft fire, including Timofeeva's, who radioed to Sholokhova to transfer command of the squadron to her, who went on to boldly dodge attacks from a second wave of Messerschmitts in order to complete the mission. Despite losing one engine and sustaining severe injuries to the head and jaw from the ordeal of fighting with the Messerschmitts, she went on to bomb the target before proceeding to lead her crippled plane to friendly territory to make an emergency landing. Upon landing, despite being weakened by her injuries, she made sure the rest of her crew was safe, and helped the gunner-radio operator Stepan Tsidrikov get out of the plane while navigator Valentina Volkova was able to climb out. Soon they were rescued and brought to a field hospital, but it was not until 1944 that Sholokhova was released from the hospital and allowed to return to flying combat missions. That year, she was promoted to deputy commander of the first squadron, which was led by Nadezhda Fedutenko, who had become the squadron commander. Earlier, the regiment had been honored with the guards designation and renamed as the 125th Guards Bomber Aviation Regiment. In December 1944, Sholokhova shocked pilots from the Normandie-Niemen regiment when she safely landed her Pe-2 during a blizzard at the airfield they were based at; while the French pilots had heard of the Soviet women combat pilots who piloted the simple Po-2 as a night bomber, but had no idea that women flew the highly advanced and formidable Pe-2 dive bomber that many male pilots had difficulty mastering. In April 1945 she was nominated for the Order of Alexander Nevsky, a medal for leadership in combat awarded only to officers; her award nomination sheet cited her 55 sorties in the war as well as various feats in combat, including how she twice replaced the squadron commander during the battles for East Prussia as well as a flight on 20 April in which a rod on her left engine broke while returning to their airbase yet she skillfully maneuvered the plane to make a safe landing, saving the plane from having to be written off. Later that month the award nomination was approved, and she became one of only nine women of the Soviet Union to receive the Order of Alexander Nevsky.

== Postwar ==
Shortly after the end of the war Sholokhova marched in the Moscow Victory Parade with several other aviators from her regiment chosen to participate in it. Initially she remained in the air force and continued with an aviation career, reaching the rank of major before leaving in 1949. On one occasion she was tasked with breaking up an ice accumulation on the Neman river that was obstructing flow of the river and threatening the city of Kaunas with flooding; several other pilots tried and failed to complete it, but she bombed the ice target without any problems. Later she moved to the city of Gorky in 1953, which was later renamed Nizhny Novgorod, where she resided for the remainder of her life; she died there on 1 February 2001 and was buried in the Maryina Roshcha cemetery.

== Awards ==
- Order of the Red Banner (1 July 1943)
- Order of Alexander Nevsky (29 April 1945)
- Order of the Patriotic War 1st class (20 July 1944 and 11 March 1985)
- campaign and jubilee medals
