= Galina Dzhunkovskaya =

Heroine of the Soviet Union (1922–1985)

Galina Ivanovna Dzhunkovskaya
- Галина Ивановна Джунковская
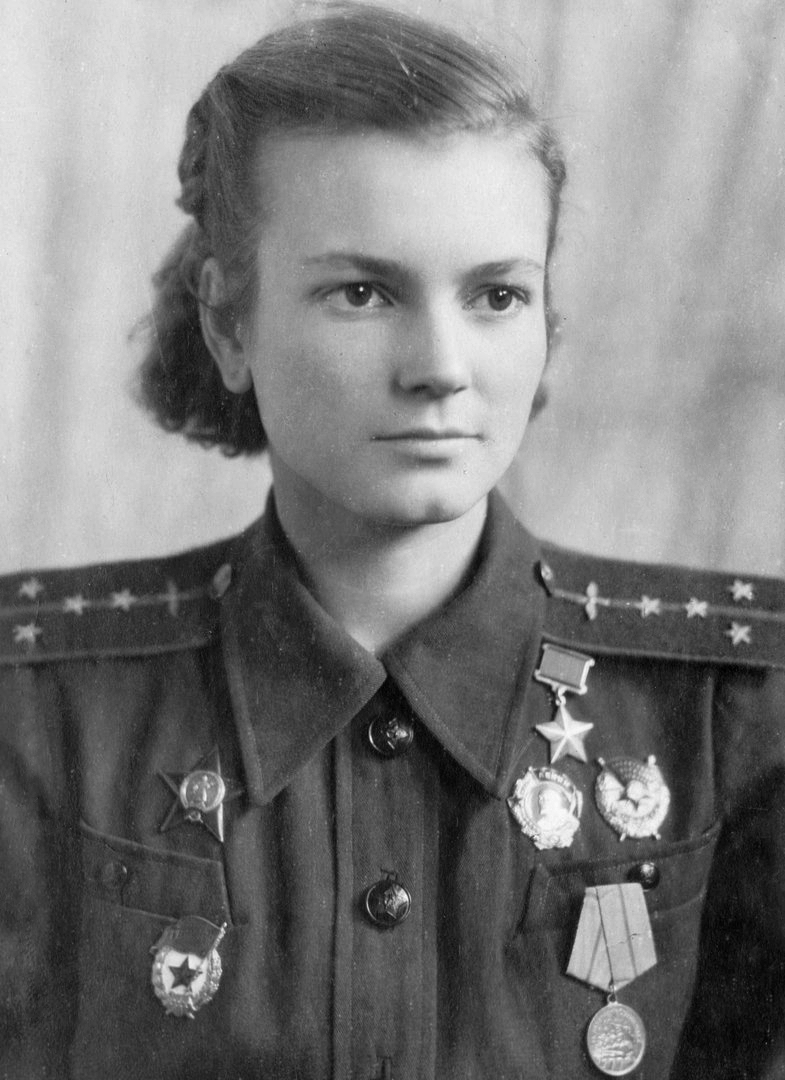
- Born: 6 October 1922; Yurkovka, Kiev Governorate, Ukrainian SSR
- Died: 12 September 1985 (aged 62); Moscow, Soviet Union
- Spouse: Valentin Markov
- Military career
- Allegiance: Soviet Union
- Branch: Soviet Air Force
- Service years: 1941 – 1950
- Rank: Major
- Unit: 125th Guards Dive Bomber Regiment
- Conflicts: World War II
- Awards: Hero of the Soviet Union

Galina Ivanovna Markova née Dzhunkovskaya (Russian: Галина Ивановна Джунковская; 6 October 1922 – 12 September 1985) was a squadron navigator in 125th Guards Dive Bomber Regiment during the Second World War who was honored with the title Hero of the Soviet Union on 18 August 1945.

== Early life ==
Dzhunkovskaya was born in Yurkovka, Kiev Governorate to a Ukrainian peasant family. She graduated as a nurse from Grozny medical school in 1938. Then, she changed her mind and went to Moscow to study aeronautical engineering in Moscow Aviation Institute.

== Wartime career ==
When the war started, she was recruited by Marina Raskova to the 122nd Special Aviation Group (Note: 122nd Aviation Group consisted of 586th Fighter Aviation Regiment, 587th Bomber Aviation Regiment (redesignated 125th Borisov Guards Bomber Aviation Regiment) and 588th Night Bomber Regiment (redesignated 46th Taman Guards Night Bomber Aviation Regiment). All units initially had all-female personnel, but the first two eventually were mixed but with a preponderance of females. All three units become operational upon the integration into regular VVS divisions where other regiments had all-male aircrew.) and had her navigator's training at Engels Military Flying School. Then, she was assigned to the 587th Bomber Aviation Regiment, which was later renamed the 125th Guards Dive Bomber Regiment in which she flew as navigator on a Petlyakov Pe-2 bomber.

On 6 June 1943, Dzhunkovskaya took part in a fierce aerial combat. Her squadron (9 aircraft), flying in V-formation, was attacked by 10 German fighters. The squadron is credited with 5 kills in that combat, one of which was the second shared kill of Dzhunkovskaya, while four Pe-2 aircraft were seriously damaged and made emergency landings on available Soviet airfields near the front. One of these aircraft was the Dzhunkovskaya's, which had both engines aflame. Her pilot Klavdia Fomicheva commanded her and the gunner to bail out, but they disobeyed because German fighters persisted in attacking the aircraft. Both the navigator and the gunner kept fighting the Germans. (Note: In the Pe-2, the navigator operated the dorsal (upper) machinegun and the gunner operated the ventral (belly) machinegun.) When the navigator run out of ammunition, she used aerial grenades (some sources claim that she used signal flares). After the enemy fighters broke off, Dzhunkovskaya helped Fomicheva to find a suitable landing place, an airfield, and to land the burning aircraft. During the spring of 1944, Dzhunkovskaya and Fomicheva flew together for a long time. On 23 June 1944, in their second sortie of the day, their aircraft was hit by enemy flack while approaching the target; the left engine was set aflame and the gunner killed. Fomicheva herself was severely wounded in the leg, but continued the mission and dropped the bombs on the target. Then she turned the burning aircraft and flew on until they reached friendly territory. Fomicheva and Dzhunkovskaya bailed out at an altitude of about 200 metres (660 ft); both suffered serious burns.

On 23 December 1944, Dzhunkovskaya was nominated for the title Hero of the Soviet Union for having completed 62 missions, taken part in five aerial engagements and been credited with two shared kills.

== Later life ==
Shortly after the end of the war, in June 1945 Dzhunkovskaya was transferred to the 107th Separate Airborne Communication Squadron, which was based in Mongolia as part of the 6th Bomber Aviation Corps. With that unit she participated Soviet-Japanese War from August to September, seeing combat in the Khingan-Mukden operation in Manchuria. While a navigator on the Pacific front she was officially awarded the title Hero of the Soviet Union on 18 August 1945. After receiving the title she remained in the military for several more years, and continued to serve with the 107th squadron in the Far East until being transferred in 1946 to the 326th Long-range Bomber Aviation Division. In 1948 she was promoted to the rank of Major, but in 1950 she entered the reserve. In 1951, she graduated from Kirovgrad Teacher's College and taught English to children for many years. Her husband, Valentin Markov, who commanded her wartime regiment, went on to become a general in the Soviet Military. They had two children, Viktor and Natalya, and lived in various cities of across the USSR due to Valentin's job before eventually settling in Moscow in 1961. There, Dzhunkovskaya died on 12 September 1985 and was buried in the Kuntsevo Cemetery.

== Awards ==
- Hero of the Soviet Union (18 August 1945)
- Order of Lenin (18 August 1945)
- Order of the Red Banner (28 June 1944)
- Order of the Patriotic War 1st class (11 March 1944)
- Order of the Red Star (9 June 1943)
- Medal "For Battle Merit" (15 November 1950)
- campaign and jubilee medals

== See also ==
- List of female Heroes of the Soviet Union

== Bibliography ==
- Cottam, Kazimiera (1998). Women in War and Resistance: Selected Biographies of Soviet Women Soldiers. Newburyport, MA: Focus Publishing/R. Pullins Co. ISBN 1-58510-160-5.
- Kazarinova, Militsa; Polyantseva, Agniya (1962). В небе фронтовом. Сборник воспоминаний советских летчиц-участниц Великой Отечественной войны [In the sky of the frontline. Collection of memoirs of Soviet pilots participating in the Great Patriotic War] (in Russian). Moscow: Molodaya gvardiya. OCLC 749039156.
- Sakaida, Henry (2003). Heroines of the Soviet Union 1941–45. Osprey Publishing. ISBN 9781780966922.
- Simonov, Andrey; Chudinova, Svetlana (2017). Женщины - Герои Советского Союза и России [Women – Heroes of the Soviet Union and Russia]. Moscow: Russian Knights Foundation and Museum of Technology Vadim Zadorozhny. ISBN 9785990960701. OCLC 1019634607.
