= Mariya Dolina =

Soviet WWII dive bomber pilot and Heroine of the Soviet Union

- Марія Доліна
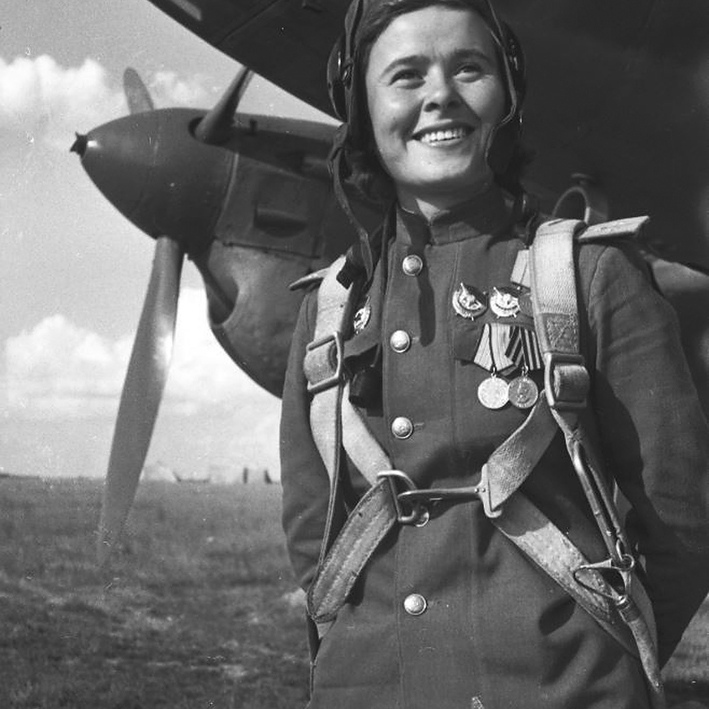
- Born: 18 December 1922; Sharovka, Omsk Oblast, Russian SFSR
- Died: 3 March 2010 (aged 87); Kyiv, Ukraine
- Military career
- Allegiance: Soviet Union
- Branch: Soviet Air Force
- Service years: 1941–1950
- Rank: Guard Captain
- Unit: 125th Guards Dive Bomber Regiment
- Conflicts: World War II; Eastern Front
- Awards: Hero of the Soviet Union

Mariya Ivanovna Dolina (Ukrainian: Марія Іванівна Доліна, Russian: Мария Ивановна Долина; 18 December 1922 – 3 March 2010) was a Pe-2 pilot and deputy squadron commander in the women's 125th “Marina M. Raskova” Borisov Guards Bomber Regiment. She was active primarily on the 1st Baltic Front during World War II. On 18 August 1945 she was awarded the title Hero of the Soviet Union.

== Early life ==
Born in the village of Sharovka (present-day Poltavsky District, Omsk Oblast in Siberia), Dolina was the eldest daughter of Ukrainian peasants. She had nine siblings.

In 1934, after Mariya's father lost his leg in the Russian Civil War, the family moved back to Ukraine again. Because of her father's condition, Dolina had to provide for the whole family, consequently she left school and went to work in a factory. Despite her mother's opposition, Mariya trained at a flying club of the paramilitary Osoaviakhim and, in 1940, graduated from the Kherson Flying School, after which she entered the Engels Military Flying School. Before the German invasion of 22 June 1941, she worked as an instructor in flying clubs in Dnipropetrovsk and Mykolaiv.

== World War II ==
In July 1941, she started her military service. She initially flew the Polikarpov Po-2, liaising with infantry units. Later she became a crew member of a Petlyakov Pe-2 twin-engine, medium-range bomber, in the 587th Dive Bomber Regiment.

Dolina, who admitted to being restless, nevertheless became a deputy squadron commander in her unit, which was later re-designated as the 125th “M.M. Raskova” Borisov Guards Dive Bomber Regiment.

On 2 June 1943, Dolina's aircraft was hit by enemy anti-aircraft artillery over Kuban prior to reaching her target, disabling an engine and causing a fire. Dolina's fighter escort had disappeared while pursuing enemy fighters, yet she continued flying and made the scheduled bomb-drop. On the way back, with no fighter escort, her flight was attacked by six German fighters (two Fw 190s and four Bf 109s). Dolina's tail gunner shot down one Fw 190 and one Bf 109. Altogether, Mariya flew seventy-two missions bombing enemy ammunition depots, strongholds, tanks, artillery batteries, rail and water transports, and supporting Soviet ground troops.

== Postwar life ==
After the war, Dolina continued to serve in the Soviet Air Force as deputy squadron commander of a bomber aviation regiment. She lived in the city of Šiauliai (now Lithuania) and then in Riga (now Latvia) where she worked in the Latvian Communist Party Central Committee until 1975. She was married twice, both times to former Soviet Air Forces mechanics. After her first husband died in 1972, she married another from her former regiment. She had two sons.

On the 50th Anniversary of the end of World War II, Dolina was promoted to the rank of major by Ukrainian President Leonid Kuchma. Many other secondary schools and pioneer detachments were named after her.

Dolina lived in Kyiv from 1983 until her death on 3 March 2010 at the age of 87 and participated in the 2009 celebrations of Victory Day. Since 1991 Kyiv is the capital of Ukraine, following Ukrainian independence. The independence of Ukraine was lambasted by Dolina in a 1998 interview when she named the dissolution of the Soviet Union "The collapse of our country was a terrible event."

== Awards and honors ==
- Hero of the Soviet Union (18 August 1945)
- Order of Lenin (18 August 1945)
- Two Orders of the Red Banner (1 July 1943 and 1 July 1944)
- Order of the Patriotic War 1st class (11 March 1985)
- campaign and service medals
- Order of Bohdan Khmelnytsky (14 October 1999)
- Honorary Citizen of Kyiv (2003)

== See also ==
- List of female Heroes of the Soviet Union
- 125th Guards Dive Bomber Regiment
- Petlyakov Pe-2

== Bibliography ==
- Kazarinova, Militsa; Polyantseva, Agniya (1962). В небе фронтовом. Сборник воспоминаний советских летчиц-участниц Великой Отечественной войны [In the sky of the frontline. Collection of memoirs of Soviet pilots participating in the Great Patriotic War] (in Russian). Moscow: Molodaya gvardiya. OCLC 749039156.
- Cottam, Kazimiera (1998). Women in War and Resistance: Selected Biographies of Soviet Women Soldiers. Newburyport, MA: Focus Publishing/R. Pullins Co. ISBN 1585101605. OCLC 228063546.
- Noggle, Anne (1994). A Dance With Death: Soviet Airwomen in World War II. College Station, TX: Texas A&M University Press. ISBN 0890966028. OCLC 474018127.
- Sakaida, Henry (2003). Heroines of the Soviet Union: 1941-45. Osprey Publishing. ISBN 978-1-84176-598-3.
- Simonov, Andrey; Chudinova, Svetlana (2017). Женщины - Герои Советского Союза и России. Moscow: Russian Knights Foundation and Museum of Technology Vadim Zadorozhny. ISBN 9785990960701. OCLC 1019634607.
