= General Markov =

General Markov may refer to:

- Sergey Markov (1878–1918), Imperial Russian Army general
- Valentin Markov (1910–1992), Soviet Air Force lieutenant general
- Vladimir Markov (politician) (1859–1919), Finnish-born Imperial Russian Army lieutenant general
- Yevgeni Ivanovich Markov (1769–1828), Imperial Russian Army lieutenant general
