= Galina Lomanova =

- Галина Дмитриевна Ломанова
- Born: 11 November 1920; Ekaterinoslav, Ukrainian SSR
- Died: 2 December 1994 (aged 74); St. Petersburg, Russian Federation
- Military career
- Allegiance: Soviet Union
- Branch: Soviet Air Force
- Service years: 1941–1947
- Rank: Senior Lieutenant
- Unit: 125th Guards Bomber Aviation Regiment
- Conflicts: World War II
- Awards: Order of the Red Banner; Order of Alexander Nevsky

Galina Dmitrievna Tenueva née Lomanova (Russian: Галина Дмитриевна Ломанова; 11 November 1920 – 2 December 1994) was a flight commander of the 1st squadron in the 125th Guards Bomber Aviation Regiment and one of the nine women awarded the Order of Alexander Nevsky.

== Early life ==
Lomanova was born on 11 November 1920 to a Ukrainian family in Ekaterinoslav. While a teenager she joined the Komsomol in order to be able to join an aeroclub. Despite not having done any previous parachute jumps she was eventually made an instructor at the aeroclub; one day she was asked to help cadets learn to parachute, and broke her leg while landing, having not been taught how to land a parachute jump. Eventually she married a pilot and gave birth to a daughter before the war; however, he was killed in action in 1943.

== Military career ==
During the early days of the German invasion of the Soviet Union Lomanova remained a flight instructor to help train pilots for the front. Soon her husband, a fighter pilot, was sent to the front, while she was initially assigned to a male fighter aviation regiment with other flight instructors at the school. Having traveled to Saratov to receive further instructions, she ran into Marina Raskova, who asked her to join the newly women's aviation unit; soon Lomanova began training with the rest of what was then the 587th Bomber Aviation Regiment. Initially the unit was assigned obsolete Su-2 aircraft, but later they received the more advanced Pe-2 dive bomber, which meant they had to undergo additional training for it. Only in January 1943 did the regiment start arriving at the front, but tragedy struck before they flew a single combat mission. While Raskova, an experienced navigator but inexperienced pilot, was leading a group of three Pe-2s to the front, she became disoriented in poor weather, and crashed on the bank of the Volga River. Lomanova was piloting one of the other Pe-2s, and wanted to land when the weather worsened but couldn't due to Raskova's order to stay in formation unless experiencing mechanical failure. Eventually visibility became so low that Lomanova and her navigator decided to leave the doomed formation to look for landmarks, but crash-landed like the other two planes, having only seen the ground at the last second. Although injured, Lomanova and her crew survived the crash and went on to fly combat sorties. Initially she had lost her confidence somewhat due the accident and was worried about deviating from flight plans, so on her first sortie under the new commander, Valentin Markov, she stuck to him closely. During that flight her plane was targeted with heavy shelling from anti-aircraft guns, which mortally wounded her tail gunner. Later she took part in a variety of successful sorties, for which she received several awards for valor and bravery in combat, the first being the Medal "For Courage". Later on in the war she was promoted to the position of flight commander, which led to her receiving the Order of Alexander Nevsky for her leadership during combat sorties in 1944. Later on in 1945 she was wounded during an intense mission with the whole dive bombing division to bomb the Nazi-occupied port of Liepāja; while approaching the target, anti-aircraft guns opened fire, hitting the left engine and sending shell fragments into the cockpit, hitting Lomanova in the arm. Initially she passed out from the injury, but her navigator Lyudmila Popova managed to wake her up and helped her get up at the controls, since they lost over 2,000 meters in altitude after Lomanova passed out. Having been separated from the rest of their formation in a crippled plane, she nevertheless managed to return to their airfield for an emergency landing, where they were then towed off the runway and the aircraft sent for extensive repairs while the crew briefed command about the flight before Lomanova was sent to the hospital. By the end of the war she totaled 49 sorties on the Pe-2.

== Postwar ==
Having remained in the military as a pilot until 1947, she settled down in Leningrad and married Nikolai Tenuev, a pilot from the 124th Guards Bomber Aviation Regiment. She died on 2 December 1994.

== Awards ==
- Order of the Red Banner
- Order of Alexander Nevsky
- Order of the Patriotic War 1st and 2nd class
- Medal "For Courage"
- campaign and jubilee medals
