= Antonina Zubkova =

Aviator and Hero of the Soviet Union

Antonina Leontievna Zubkova
- Антонина Леонтьевна Зубкова
- Born: 12 October 1920; Semion, Ryazan Governorate, Russian SFSR
- Died: 13 November 1950 (aged 30); Moscow, Soviet Union
- Burial place: Vagankovo Cemetery, Moscow
- Spouse: Yevgeny Nedugov (m. 1947)
- Children: Yelena Nedugov
- Military career
- Allegiance: Soviet Union
- Branch: Soviet Air Force
- Service years: 1941 — 1945
- Rank: Captain
- Unit: 125th Guards Dive Bomber Regiment
- Conflicts: World War II; Eastern Front
- Awards: Hero of the Soviet Union

Antonina Leontievna Zubkova (Russian: Антонина Леонтьевна Зубкова; 12 October 1920 — 13 November 1950) was a captain and squadron navigator in the women's 125th Guards Dive Bomber Regiment during World War II who was awarded the title Hero of the Soviet Union.

== Prewar life ==
Zubkova was born on 12 October 1920 to a Russian family in the city of Semyon in the Ryazan district of the Russian SFSR. After completing her seventh grade of school in her home village in 1935 she moved to Korablino, where she studied until graduating from her tenth grade of school in 1938, following which she went on to enter the Faculty of Mechanics and Mathematics of Moscow State University, where she was considered one of the top students.

== World War II ==
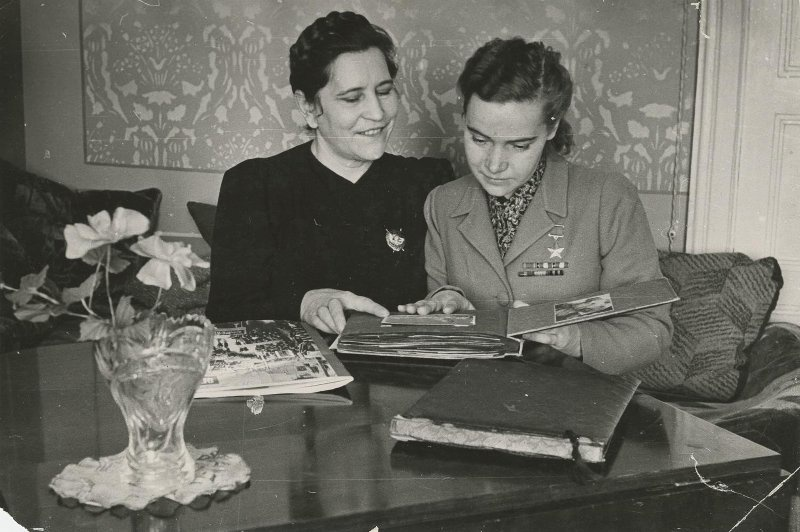
Zubkova with Russian Civil War Chapayev division veteran Mariya Popova at Popova's house, 1945–1950

Zubkova at Moscow State University, January 1946

During her fourth year of university, Zubkova had to pause her studies due to the German invasion of the Soviet Union. After initially working in the construction of defensive structures and taking part in air defense watch duty at night, she received word that Marina Raskova was recruiting women for military aviation roles. Raskova met with Zubkova and thought she would make a good navigator for bombers due to her mathematics skills, and was accepted into the women's aviation group in October 1941. She then underwent training at Engels Military Aviation School, and was very impressed by her first training flight, as she had never been in an airplane before. After graduating from navigation training in February 1942 she was appointed as chief of communications of the 587th Bomber Regiment, which arrived at the warfront January 1943 and was eventually awarded the guards designation, becoming the 125th Guards Dive Bomber Regiment. Several months after being made chief of communications Zubkova was reappointed to work as a flight navigator. After making her first twelve sorties from April to June 1943 she received her first combat award, the Order of the Red Star. During a mission with Nadezhda Fedutenko on 26 May 1943 their Pe-2 was hit with shrapnel over Krasnodar, seriously injuring her pilot Fedutenko in the back of her head, leaving Zubkova to land the plane.

In 1944 Zubkova was promoted to squadron navigator, and in mid-March 1945 she was nominated for the title Hero of the Soviet Union for having tallied 56 sorties, resulting in the destruction of three ammunition depots, three trains, twelve tanks, fifty vehicles, and five machine-gun points. In addition to assisting navigation and bombing targets, Zubkova took high-quality photos showing the results of bombing for reports and reconnaissance of enemy troops; such photos were praised by her superior officers for providing useful information about the state forces on the ground and for the evidence of mission success. By the end of the war she totaled 68 sorties.

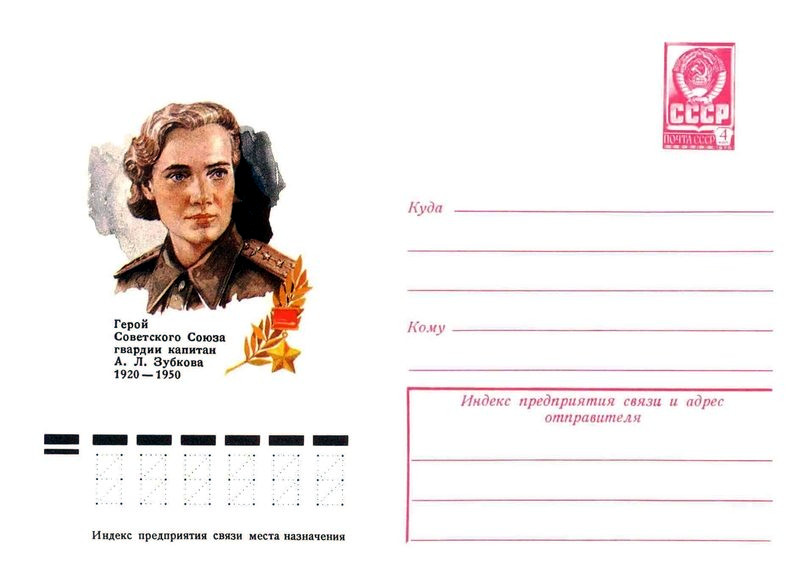
1977 envelope featuring Zubkova.

== Later life ==
After entering the reserve in September 1945 she returned to her studies at Moscow State University, completing her initial studies in 1948 before moving on to the graduate school of Research Institute of Mechanics. She married a navigator from another aviation regiment, Yevgeny Nedugov, and gave birth to their daughter Yelena in 1947. She committed suicide on 13 November 1950 and was buried in the Vagankovo Cemetery in Moscow.

== Awards ==
- Hero of the Soviet Union (18 August 1945)
- Order of Lenin (18 August 1945)
- Two Orders of the Red Banner (5 September 1943 and 10 July 1944)
- Order of the Red Star (18 June 1943)
- campaign medals

== See also ==
- List of female Heroes of the Soviet Union
- 125th Guards Dive Bomber Regiment
- Petlyakov Pe-2
