= Valentina Kravchenko =

Russian pilot (1917–2000)

Valentina Savitskaya
- Валентина Флегонтовна Савицкая
- Savitskaya, c. 1940's
- Born: 9 January [O.S. 27 December 1916] 1917; Kemerovo, Tomsk Governorate, Russian Empire
- Died: 15 February 2000 (aged 83); Moscow, Russian Federation
- Military career
- Allegiance: Soviet Union
- Branch: Soviet Air Force
- Service years: 1941–1947
- Rank: Guard Captain
- Unit: 125th Guards Dive Bomber Regiment
- Conflicts: World War II
- Awards: Hero of the Russian Federation

Valentina Flegontovna Savitskaya née Kravchenko (Russian: Валентина Флегонтовна Савицкая; 9 January [O.S. 27 December 1916] 1917 – 15 February 2000) was a Russian pilot and squadron navigator in the 125th Guards Dive Bomber Regiment during World War II. She was awarded the title Hero of the Russian Federation on 10 April 1995.

== Early life ==
Valentina Kravchenko was born on 9 January 1917 to a Russian family in Kemerovo, Siberia. After graduating from secondary school she studied at the Tomsk aeroclub and later the Tomsk Industrial Institute before entering the Kherson Aviation School in 1935. In 1940 she began working as an instructor at the Saratov Aeroclub.

== Wartime career ==
Kravchenko joined the Red Army in October 1941 several months after the German invasion of the Soviet Union. However, she did not see combat until the 587th Bomber Aviation Regiment (which was later honored with the Guards designation and renamed the 125th Guards Dive Bomber Regiment) was deployed to front in 1943. She experienced her baptism by fire in the Petlyakov Pe-2 dive bomber during the Battle of Stalingrad. In April and May 1943, Kravchenko participated in the bombing of enemy fortifications on the Kuban bridgehead. From in July 1943 to July 1944 she fought in the battles of Kursk, Smolensk, and the Yelnya Offensive, assisting Soviet troops in advancing in Vitebsk and Orsha and destroying enemy defensive fortifications on the Kalinin Front. On 27 August 1943 while flying as part of the crew of Klavdia Fomicheva her plane was badly damaged by anti-aircraft fire during a bombing mission, after which Kravchenko helped bring the crippled plane to a nearby airfield. By the end of the war she totaled 66 sorties on the Pe-2, dropping 67 tons of bombs on enemy forces.

== Later life ==
Kravchenko retired from the military after her regiment was disbanded in 1947 after the end of the war. Shortly after leaving the military she married, changing her surname to Savitskaya. She and her husband lived in Moscow where she worked Space Research Institute in addition to becoming chairman of the veterans council of her wartime regiment. Several years after the dissolution of the Soviet Union she was awarded the title Hero of the Russian Federation on 10 April 1995 for her contributions to the war. She died on 15 February 2000 and was buried in the Mitinskoe Cemetery.

== Awards ==
- Hero of the Russian Federation (10 April 1995)
- Order of the Red Banner (4 May 1943)
- Order of Alexander Nevsky (29 April 1945)
- Order of the Patriotic War 2nd class (11 March 1985)
- Order of the Red Star (4 May 1943)
- campaign and jubilee medals

== See also ==
- List of female Heroes of the Russian Federation
