= Galina Brok-Beltsova =

Soviet bomber navigator (1925–2024)

- Галина Павловна Брок-Бельцова
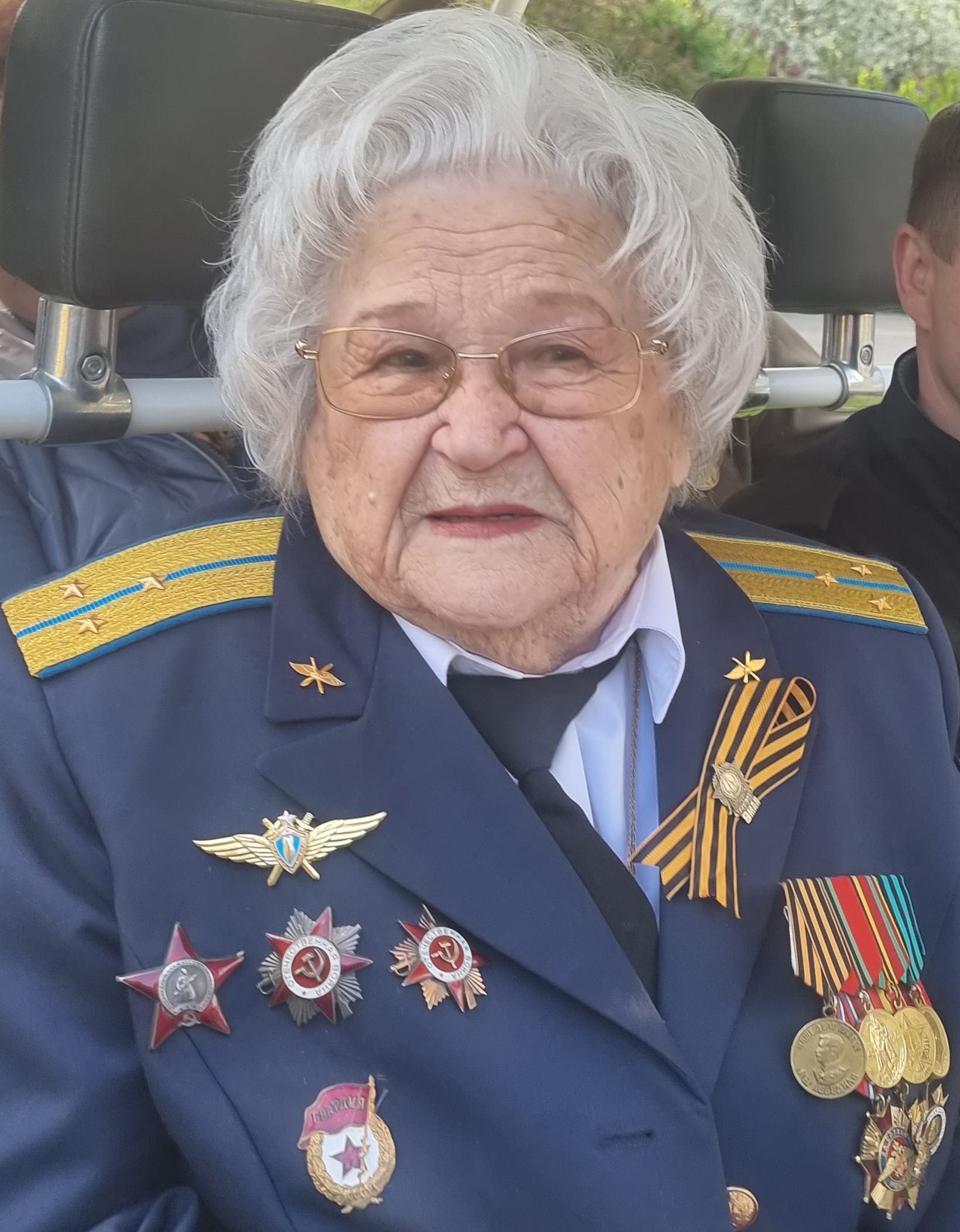
- Brok-Beltsova in 2023
- Born: 12 February 1925; Moscow, Russian SFSR, USSR
- Died: 15 August 2024 (aged 99)
- Military career
- Allegiance: Soviet Union
- Branch: Soviet Air Force
- Service years: 1942–1946
- Rank: Lieutenant
- Unit: 125th Guards Bomber Aviation Regiment
- Conflicts: World War II
- Awards: Order of the Patriotic War

Galina Pavlovna Brok-Beltsova (Russian: Галина Павловна Брок-Бельцова; 12 February 1925 – 15 August 2024) was a Soviet bomber navigator and the last surviving member of the women's aviation regiments founded by Marina Raskova.

== Early life ==
She was born in Moscow in 1925 and raised there. She was an athletic child, participating in volleyball, swimming, skating and skiing.

== World War II ==
In 1941, as Moscow was being bombed by Nazi aircraft, 16-year-old Brok-Beltsova volunteered to join her country's defense. Along with hundreds of other volunteers who were accepted into the women's aviation group founded by Raskova, she was evacuated east to Samara, where they lived in primitive conditions and underwent further flight training. In 1943 she was chosen for retraining on the Petlyakov Pe-2 dive bomber.

On 23 June 1944, by then a member of the 125th Guards Bomber Aviation Regiment, she flew her first combat mission in the Belarusian campaign. Nominally requiring a three-person crew, the Pe-2 often flew with only two, requiring the navigator to also act as radio operator and bombardier. Along with pilot Antonina Bondareva-Spitsina, she flew thirty-six combat missions in total.

== Post-war ==
After the war Brok-Beltsova married Georgy Beltsov, a fellow air force officer. She was intent on completing her education and earned a PhD in history from Moscow State University in 1960, taught at several universities, and was head of the Moscow Power Engineering Institute's history department until her retirement. She also worked at the KGB for some time. She and her husband had three children and remained married until Georgy's death in 2005.

Brok-Beltsova was often honored at annual events commemorating Russia's role in World War II. In 2020 she was invited to a brunch with Russian president Vladimir Putin to commemorate the 75th anniversary of the war's end. She was the last living member of the Soviet Union's three all-female air regiments.

As of 2020 Brok-Beltsova lived in the city of Mytishchi, just outside of Moscow. She died on 15 August 2024, at the age of 99.
