= Order of Alexander Nevsky =

Award of the Russian Federation

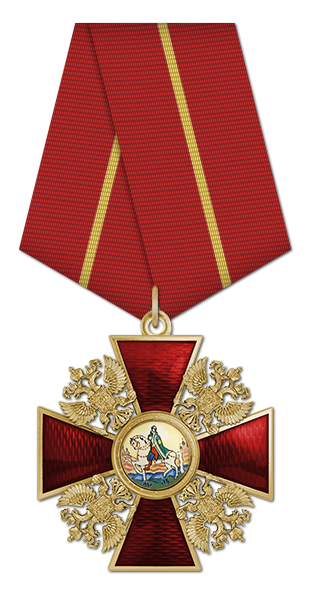
- Order of Alexander Nevsky (obverse)
- Type: Single-grade order
- Awarded for: Meritorious Service of 20 years or more
- Presented by: Russian Federation; USSR
- Eligibility: Civil Servants
- Status: Active
- Established: July 29, 1942
- Ribbon of the Order of Alexander Nevsky

Precedence
- Next (higher): Order of Saint Catherine the Great Martyr
- Next (lower): Order of Suvorov

The Order of Alexander Nevsky (Russian: орден Александра Невского, romanised: orden Alexandra Nevskogo) is an order of merit of the Russian Federation named in honour of saint Alexander Nevsky (1220–1263) and bestowed upon civil servants for twenty years or more of highly meritorious service. It was originally established by the Soviet Union as a military honour during World War II, more precisely by Decree of the Presidium of the Supreme Soviet of the USSR of July 29, 1942. Its statute was amended by Decree of the Presidium of the Supreme Soviet of the USSR of February 26, 1947. It bears a similar name to the Imperial Order of Saint Alexander Nevsky which had been established by Empress Catherine I of Russia in 1725, and continued to be bestowed by the heads of the House of Romanov until the 1917 Russian Revolution. The Order of Alexander Nevsky was reinstated by the Soviet Union, minus the words "Imperial" and "Saint", and awarded to officers of the army for personal courage and resolute leadership. The Order was retained by the new Russian Federation following the dissolution of the USSR by Decision of the Supreme Soviet of the Russian Federation 2557-I of March 20, 1992 but was never awarded. The September 7, 2010 Decree No.1099 of the President of the Russian Federation redesigned the badge of the Order closer to the pre-1917 imperial model and amended the statute of the Order making it a purely civilian award.

== Statute of the Soviet and early Russian Federation Order ==
The Order of Alexander Nevsky was awarded to Red Army commanders who displayed personal bravery in fighting for their country in World War II, for courage, bravery and skilful leadership that ensured the success of an operation.

The Order of Alexander Nevsky was awarded in a single class by Decree of the Presidium of the Supreme Soviet of the USSR to divisional, brigade, regimental, battalion, company and platoon commanders for:

- the initiative of a sudden, bold and swift attack on the enemy inflicting major damage with minimal losses;
- constant and clear leadership in the coordination of arms during the execution of a mission resulting in the complete or near total destruction of numerically superior enemy forces;
- the rapid saturation of numerically superior enemy artillery or the destruction of the artillery emplacements that were preventing the advance of our units, or the destruction of a bunker or fortifications, or for repelling a large enemy armour attack causing heavy damage, while in command of an artillery unit or battery;
- successfully completing combat operations that caused great damage to the enemy with no loss while in command of an armoured unit or sub unit;
- successfully carrying out a series of combat missions, inflicting severe damage to enemy manpower and equipment without loss while in command of an aviation unit or sub unit;
- rapid actions and initiative resulting in the capture or destruction of enemy fortifications helping friendly troops to surge forward during an offensive;
- the systematic organisation of clear and timely communications greatly limiting losses, ensuring the success of major combat operations;
- able and rapid execution of amphibious operations with minimal losses, which caused great damage to the enemy and ensured the success of the overall mission.

The Soviet Order of Alexander Nevsky was worn on the right side of the chest and when in the presence of other Orders of the USSR, placed after the Order of Bogdan Khmelnitsky 3rd class. The early Russian Federation Order of Alexander Nevsky was also worn on the right side of the chest and when in the presence of other Orders, placed after the Order of Kutuzov 2nd class.

== Description of the Soviet and early Russian Federation Order ==
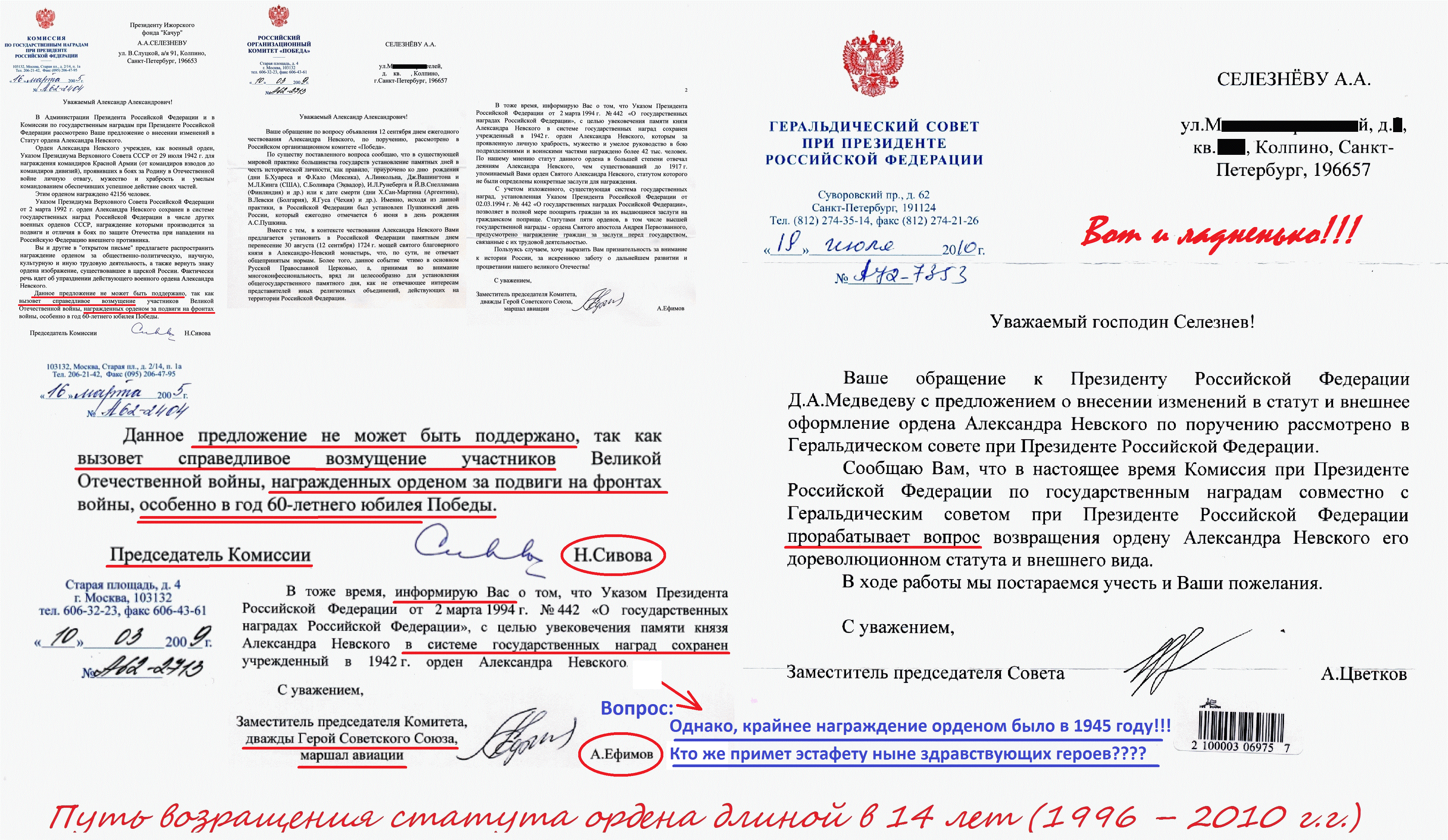
Responses to A. A. Seleznev, the Commission on State Awards (2005), A. N. Efimov (2009) and the Heraldic Council (2010) on the issue of including the Order of Alexander Nevsky in the state awards system

The Soviet and early Russian Federation Order of Alexander Nevsky was a silver, 50 mm wide and high ruby-red enamelled, five-pointed convex star superimposed on a decagon composed of polished diverging rays. The star had gold-plated rims and edges. In the centre of the star, a central medallion bearing the left profile relief image of a helmeted Alexander Nevsky and the inscription along the left and right circumference in prominent letters "ALEXANDER NEVSKY" (Russian: «АЛЕКСАНДР НЕВСКИЙ»). The central medallion was surrounded by a gilt laurel wreath bisected at its base by a silver shield bearing the hammer and sickle, the shield is superimposed over gilded sword, spear, bow and quiver of arrows. Two gilt pollaxes cross behind the central medallion, their outward facing blades protruding on either side of the five pointed star's top arm and extending slightly past the decagon's outer edge, their base visible just inside of the star's two lower arms.

The original Order was suspended by a ring through a suspension loop to an early Soviet rectangular mount covered by a red silk moiré ribbon. This was changed in 1943 to a threaded stud and nut attachment on the reverse.

The Soviet variants of the Order used the likeness of the actor Nikolay Cherkasov as Alexander Nevsky from Eisenstein's 1938 film, as there were no known portraits of Nevsky made in his lifetime.

The design of the early Russian Federation variant of the Order differed from the Soviet variant only in the abrogation of the hammer and sickle from the silver shield on the obverse.

1942–1943	1943–1991	1992–2010	2010 to date
Early Soviet Variant	Soviet Variant Ribbon	Early Russian Federation Variant	Current Russian Federation Variant

== Recipients of the Soviet Order of Alexander Nevsky (partial list) ==
During World War II the order was granted to more than 42,000 Soviet servicemen and nine servicewomen, about 70 foreign generals and officers, and over 1,470 military units that display the order on their banners; in all, 50,585 were awarded. Of those recipients, nine were women – Serafima Amosova, Yevdokiya Bershanskaya, Galina Lomanova, Valentina Kravchenko, Yevdokiya Nikulina, Olga Sanfirova, Mariya Smirnova, Vera Tikhomirova, and Olga Sholokhova.

- Ivan Kozhedub
- Amet-khan Sultan
- Hazi Aslanov
- Andrey Vitruk
- Donald Bennett
- Tsezar Kunikov
- Pavel Kutakhov
- Mikhail Mesheryakov
- Leonid Bykovets
- Vitaly Popkov
- Georgy Zakharov
- Pierre Pouyade
- Alexander Altunin

== Statute of the modern Order ==
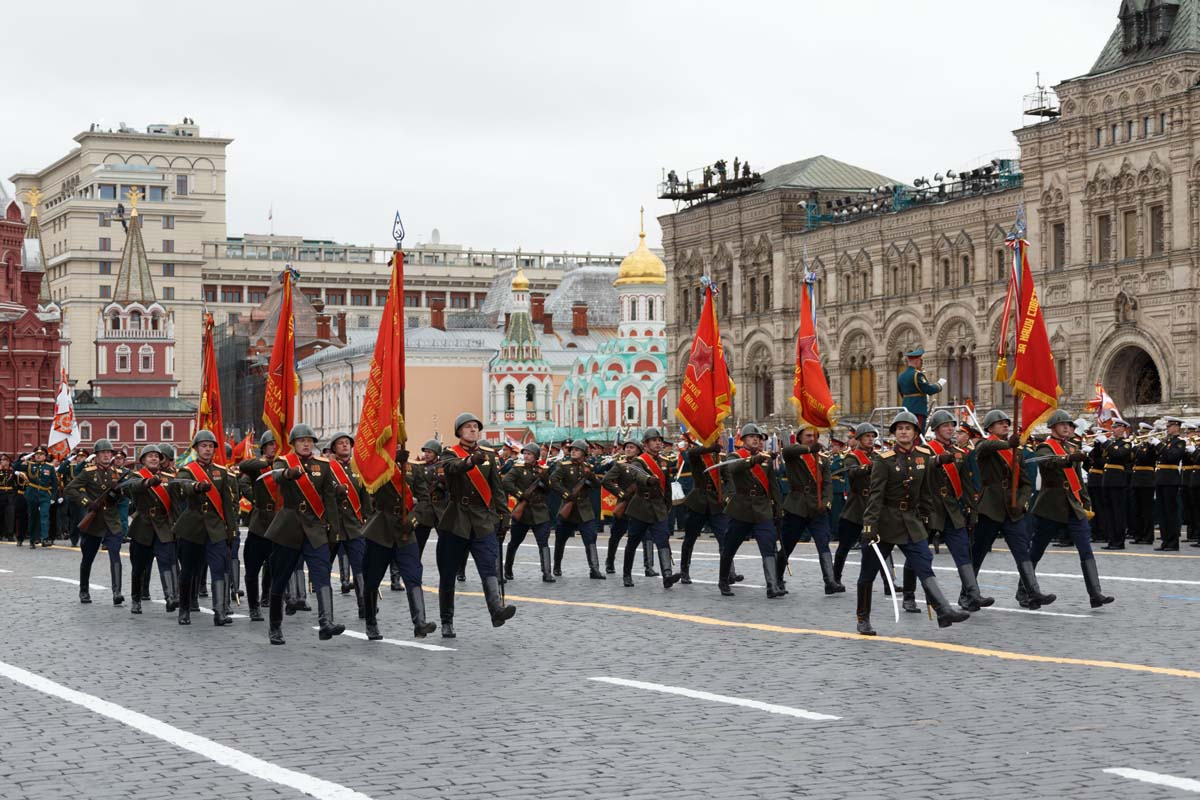
Russian Soldiers dressed in historical Soviet parade uniforms carrying the Red Army combat banners which received the Order of Alexander Nevsky during the Second World War.

The Order of Alexander Nevsky is awarded to citizens of the Russian Federation who have served in civil service positions for at least 20 years and have achieved special personal merit in nation-building, for many years of honest service and excellent results achieved while on duty, for strengthening the international prestige of Russia, the country's defence, economic development, science, education, culture, the arts, health care and other services, as well as to other citizens of the Russian Federation if previously awarded a state Order, for outstanding personal achievements in various sectors of the economy, research, social, cultural, educational and other socially useful activities.

The Order of Alexander Nevsky may also be awarded to prominent foreign politicians, public figures or representatives of business communities of foreign states, for merit in the development of multilateral cooperation with the Russian Federation and to assist in its socio-economic development.

The Russian Federation Order of Precedence dictates the Order of Alexander Nevsky is to be worn on the left breast with other orders and medals immediately after the Order For Merit to the Fatherland 4th class.

== Award description ==
The Order of Alexander Nevsky is a 40 mm wide gold plated ruby enamelled cross pattée. Between each cross arm, a gold double-headed eagle, the State Emblem of the Russian Federation. In the centre of the obverse, a circular convex medallion bearing the enamelled figure of Prince Alexander Nevsky riding a white steed facing left. On the reverse centre, from the right end of the right arm of the cross to the left end of the left end of the cross, the horizontal inscription in relief "FOR WORK AND FATHERLAND" (Russian: «ЗА ТРУДЫ И ОТЕЧЕСТВО»). At the bottom of the reverse of the lower cross arm, the award's serial number.

The Order of Alexander Nevsky is secured to a standard Russian pentagonal mount by a ring through the suspension loop. The mount is covered by an overlapping silk moiré 24mm wide red ribbon with a central 1.5mm wide yellow stripe.

== Notable recipients ==
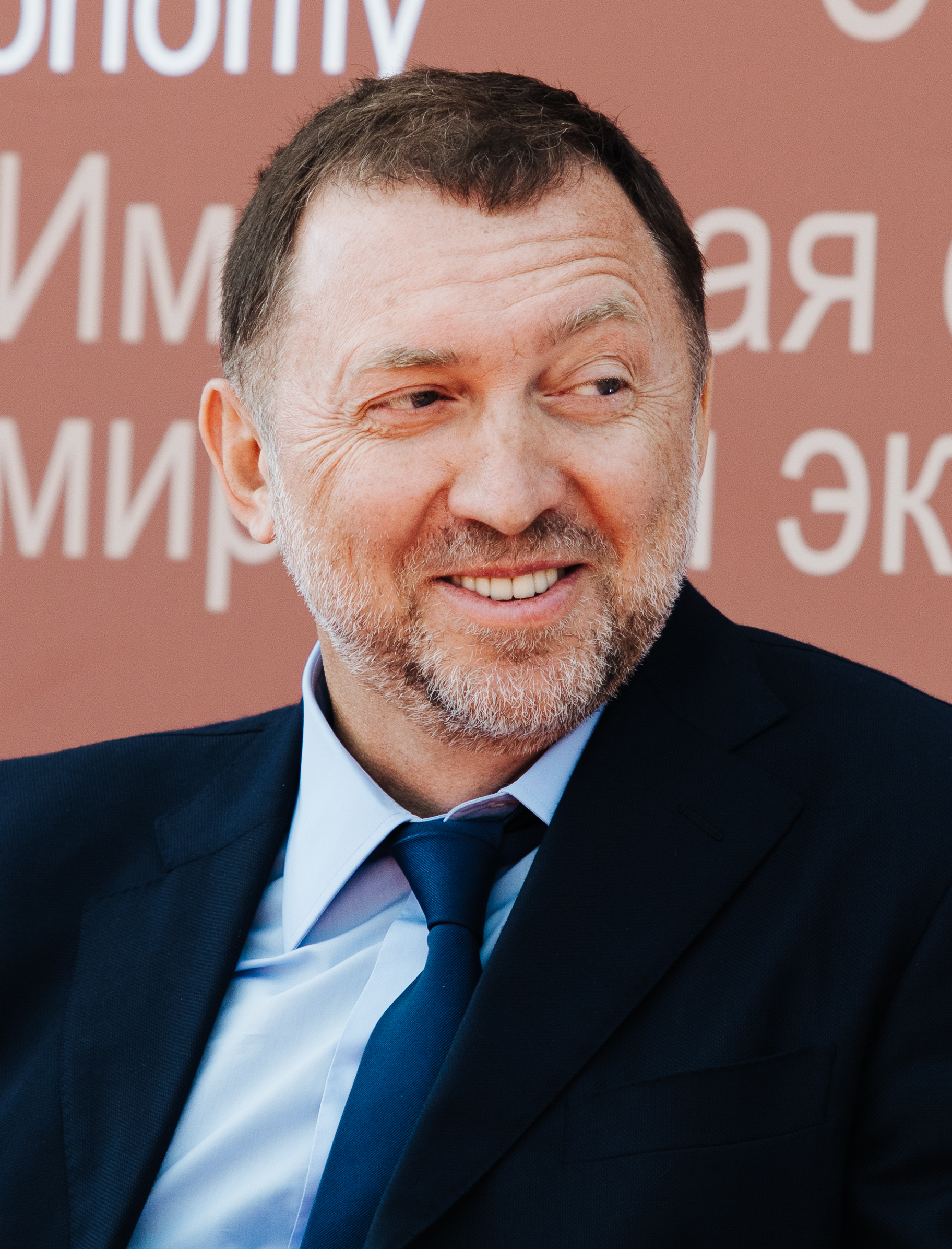
Oleg Deripaska, Businessman

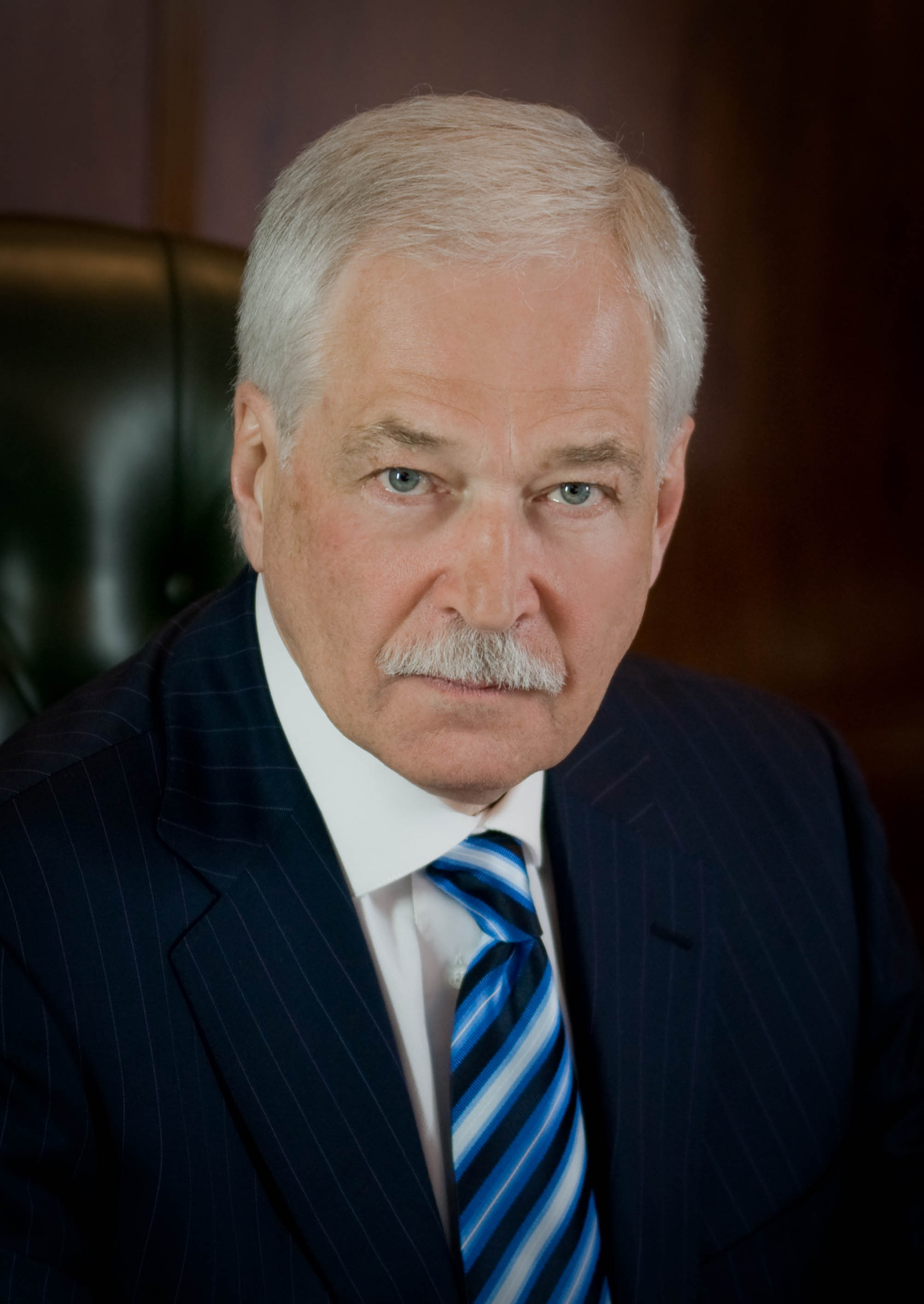
Boris Vyacheslavovich Gryzlov, Politician

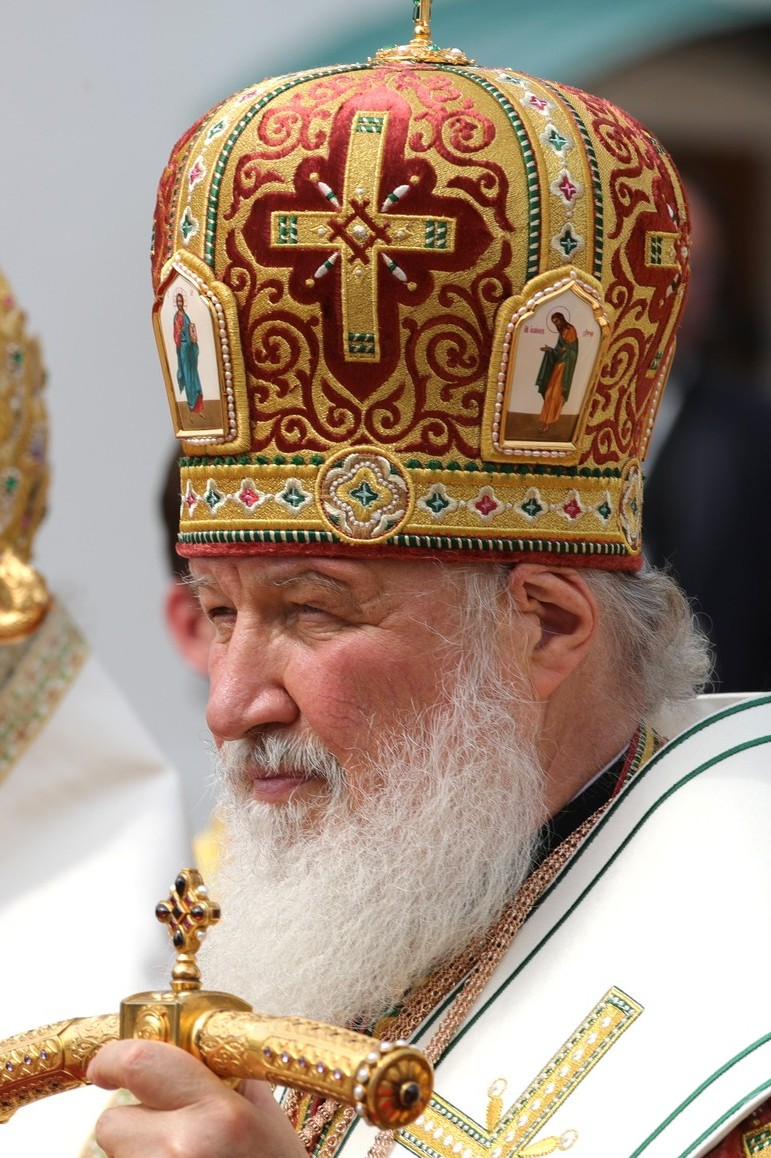
Russian Orthodox Patriarch Kirill I of Moscow

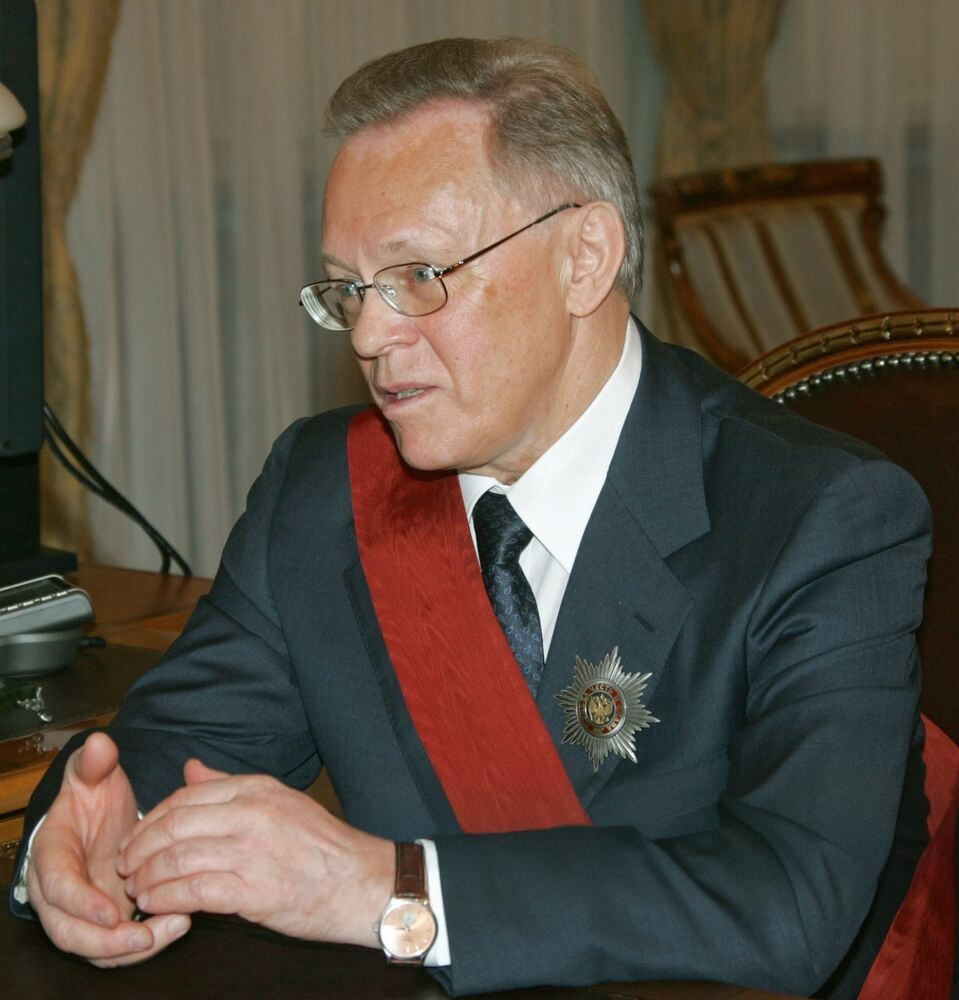
Mathematician Yury Sergeyevich Osipov

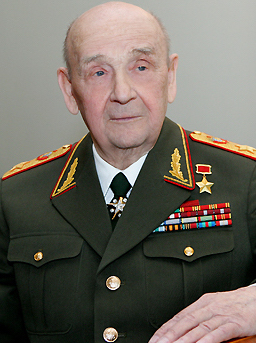
Marshal Sergei Leonidovich Sokolov

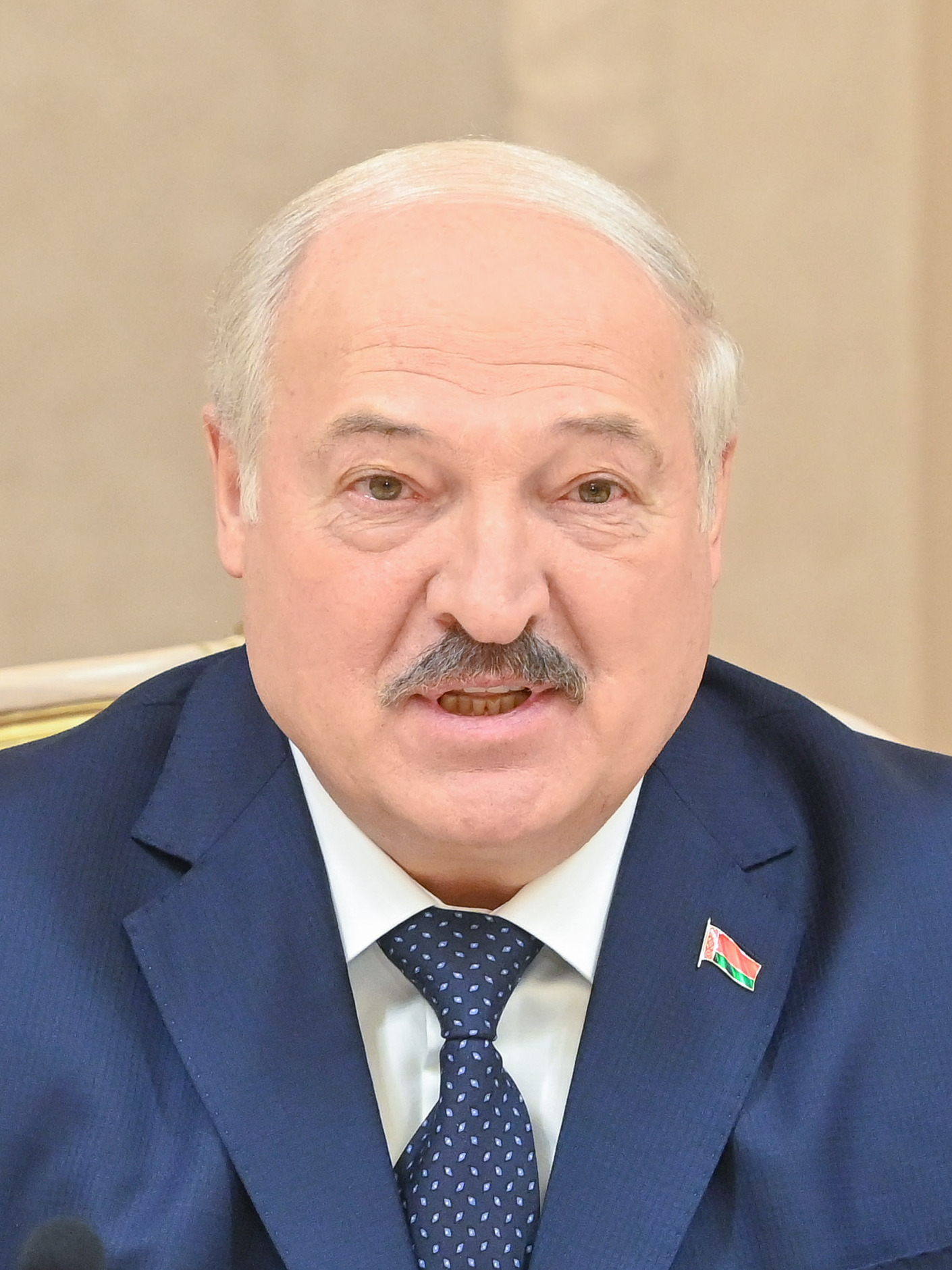
Alexander Lukashenko, President of Belarus

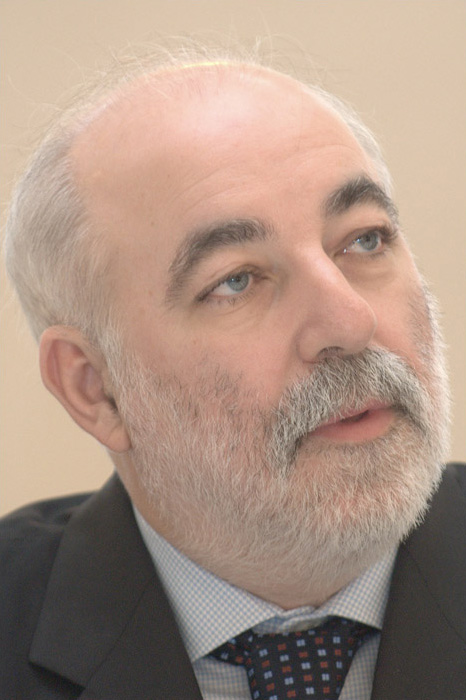
Viktor Vekselberg, Businessman

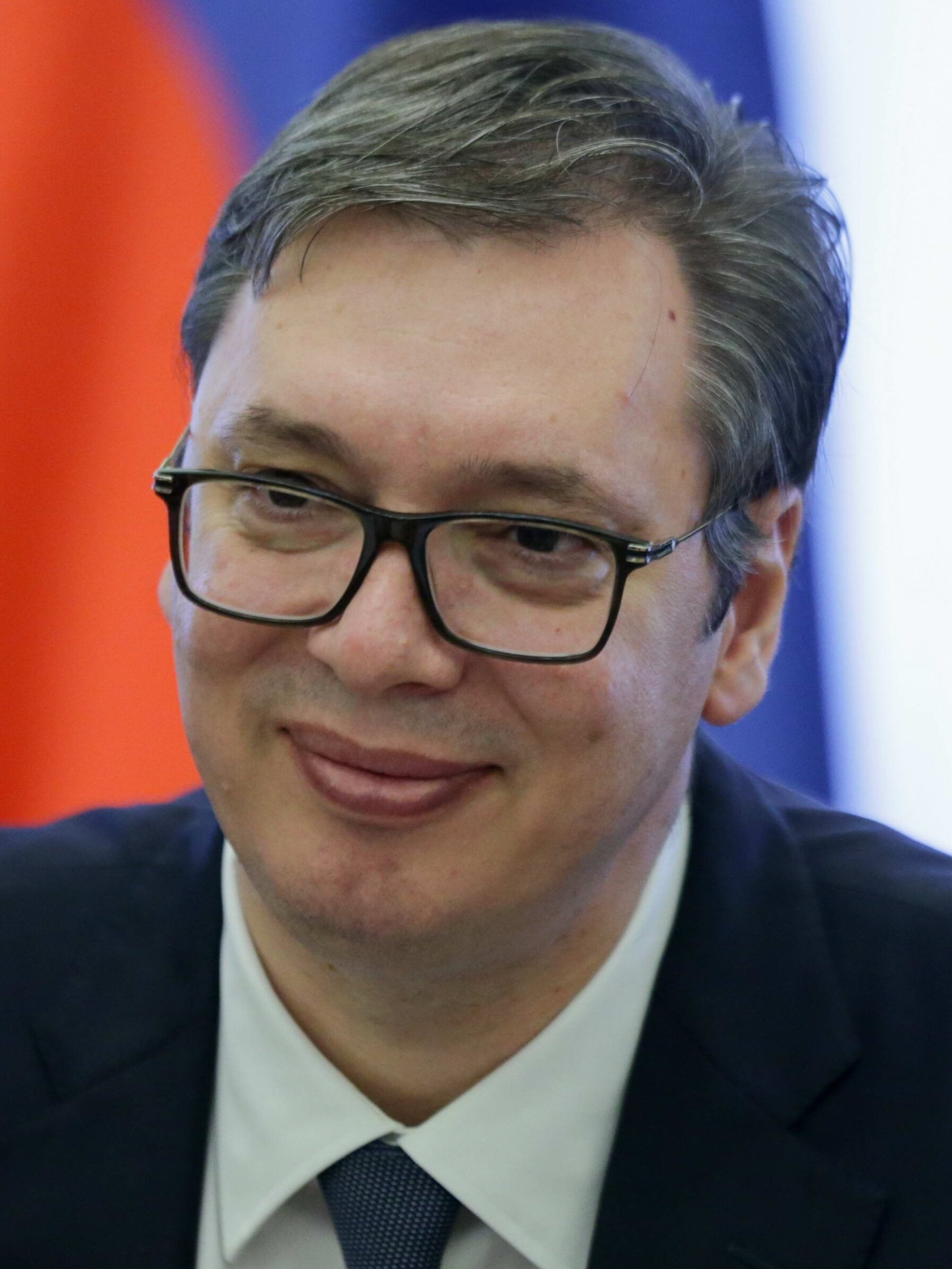
Aleksandar Vučić, former President of Serbia

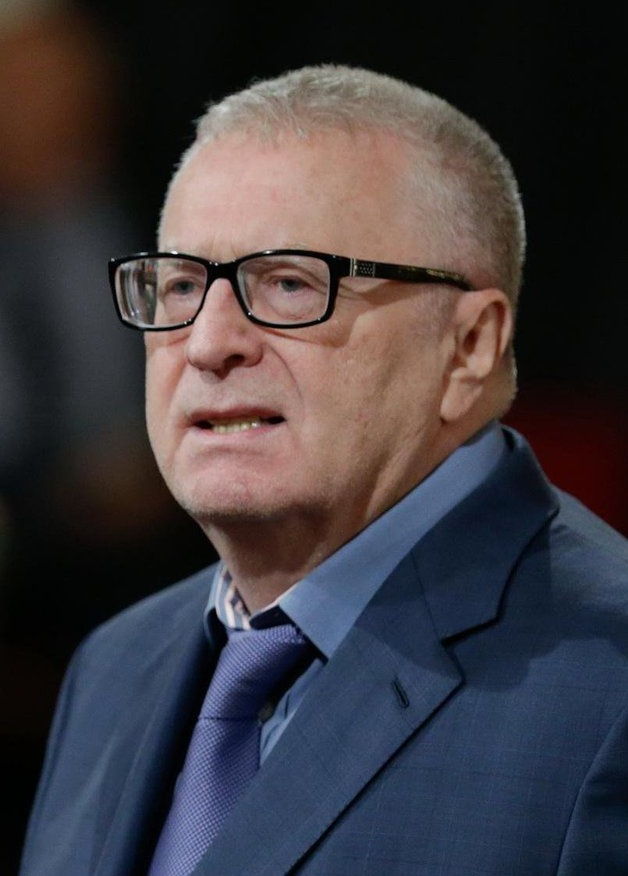
Vladimir Zhirinovsky, Politician

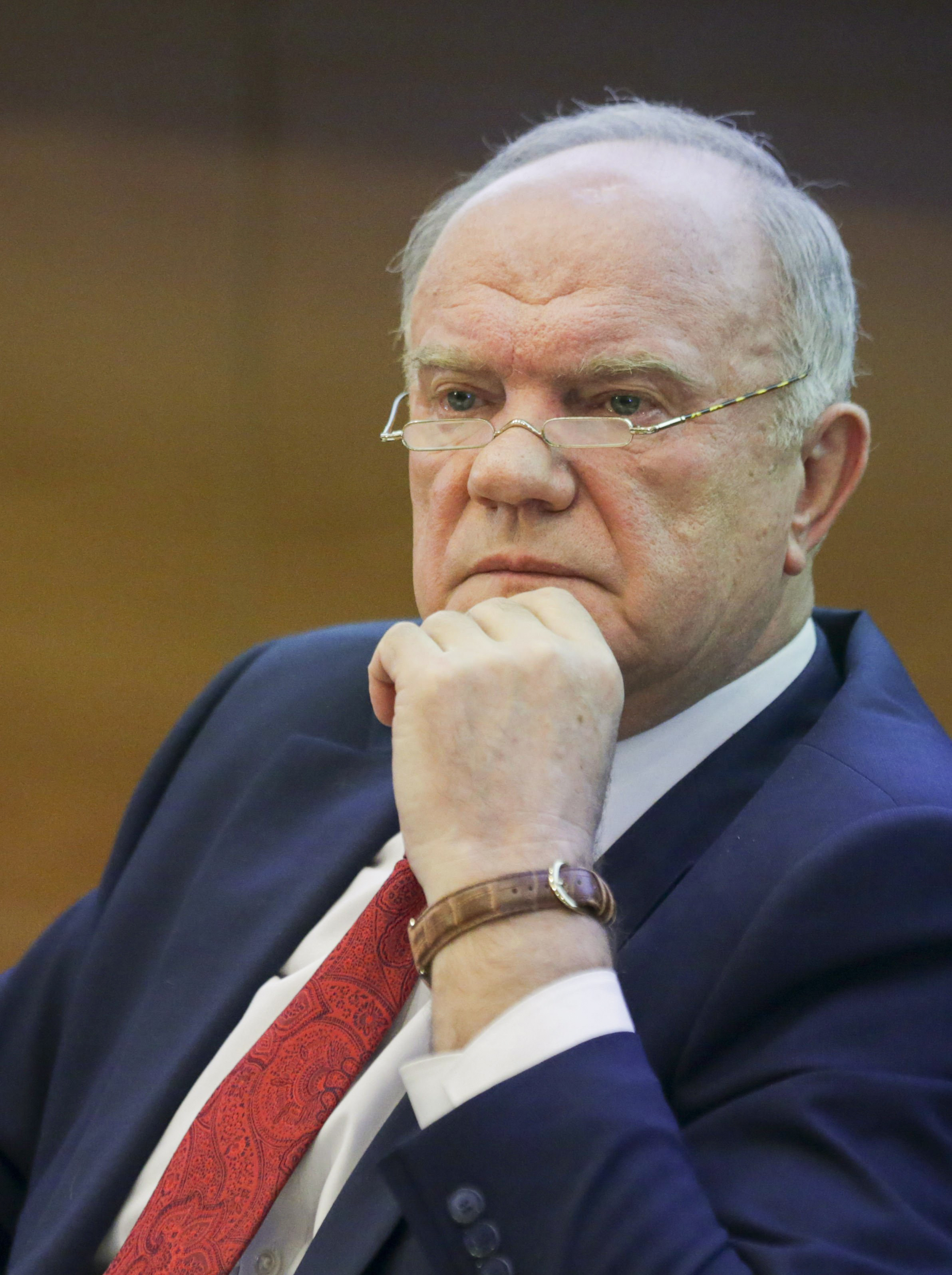
Gennady Zyuganov, Politician

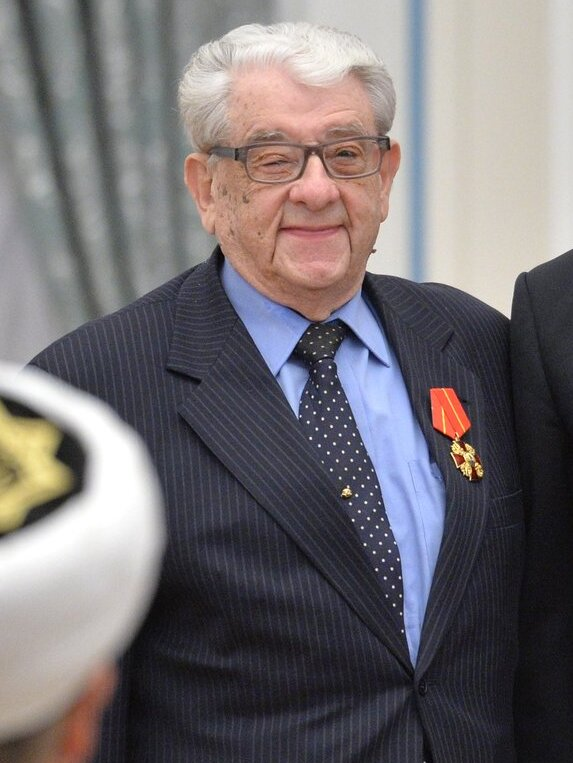
Valentin Zorin, Political commentator

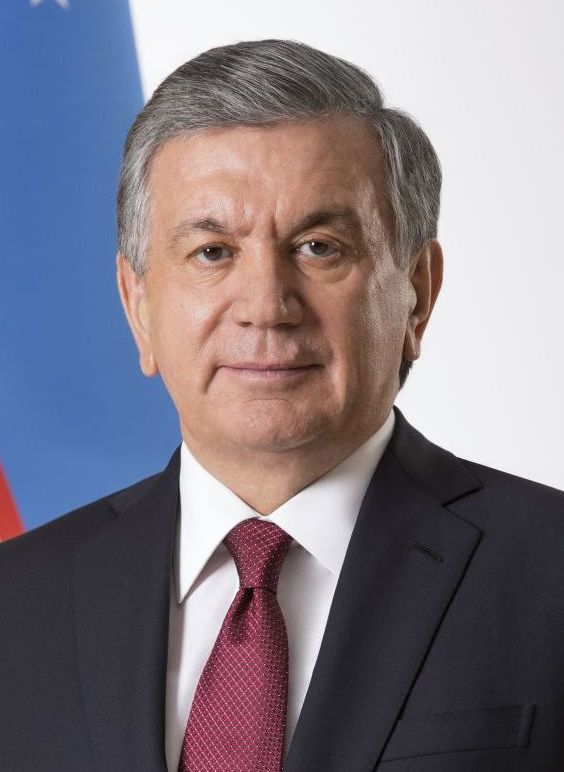
Shavkat Mirziyoyev, President of Uzbekistan

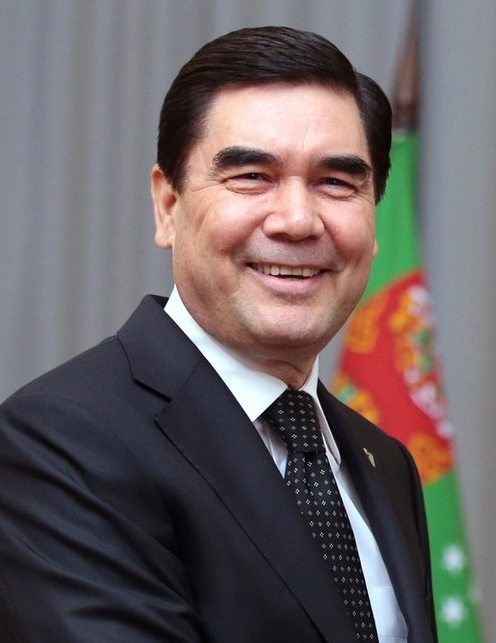
Gurbanguly Berdimuhamedow, former President of Turkmenistan

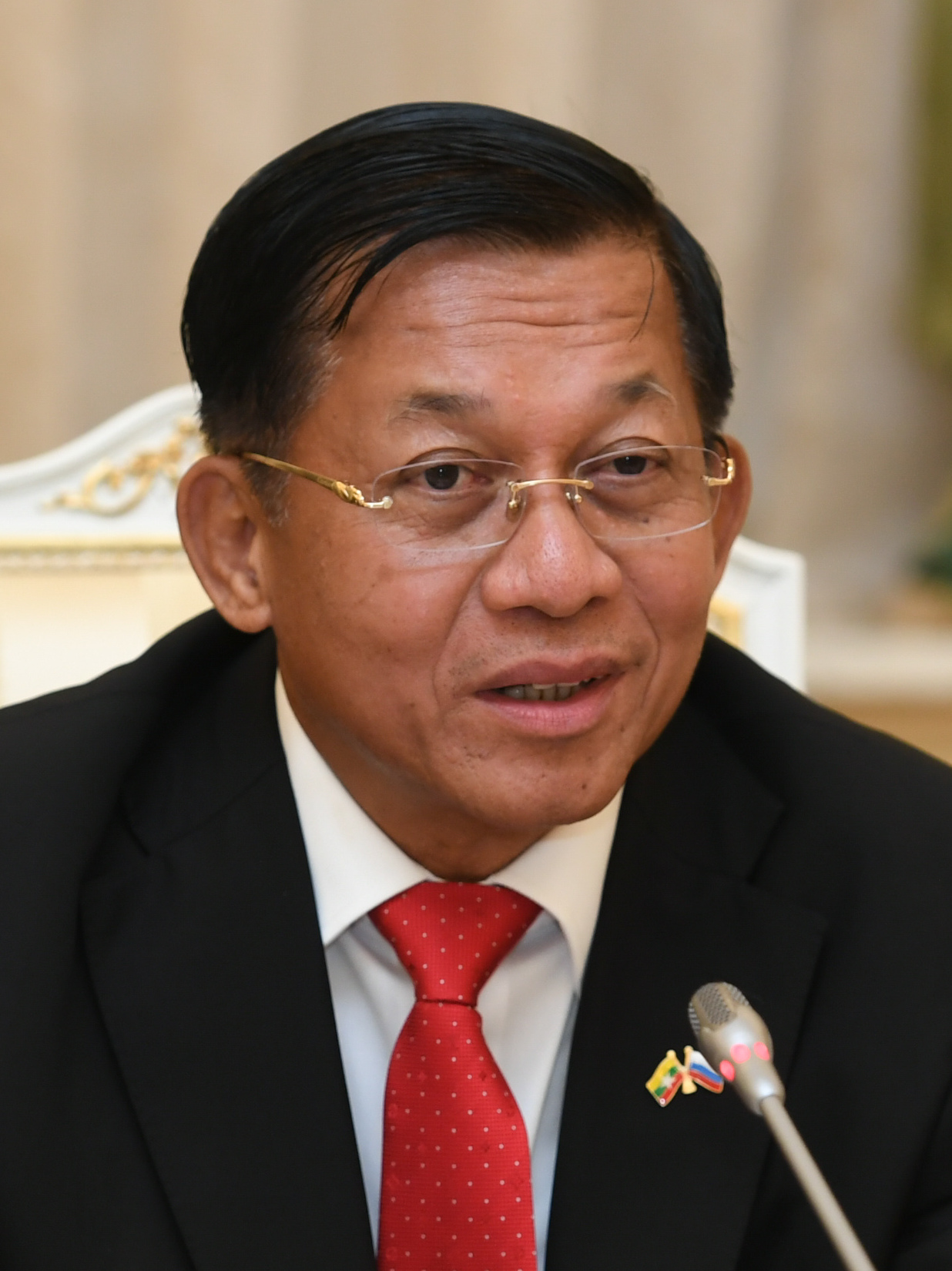
Min Aung Hlaing, Chairman of the State Administration Council of Myanmar

Milorad Dodik, former Chairman of the Presidency of Bosnia and Herzegovina

== See also ==
- Order of St. Alexander Nevsky
- Awards and decorations of the Soviet Union
- Awards and decorations of the Russian Federation
- Awards and Emblems of the Ministry of Defense of the Russian Federation
- Awards of the Ministry of Internal Affairs of Russia
- Awards of the Federal Security Service of the Russian Federation
- Awards of the Federal Protective Service of the Russian Federation
- Awards of the Ministry for Emergency Situations of Russia
