= Klavdia Fomicheva =

Soviet commander during WW2

Klavdia Yakovlevna Fomicheva
- Клавдия Яковлевна Фомичёва
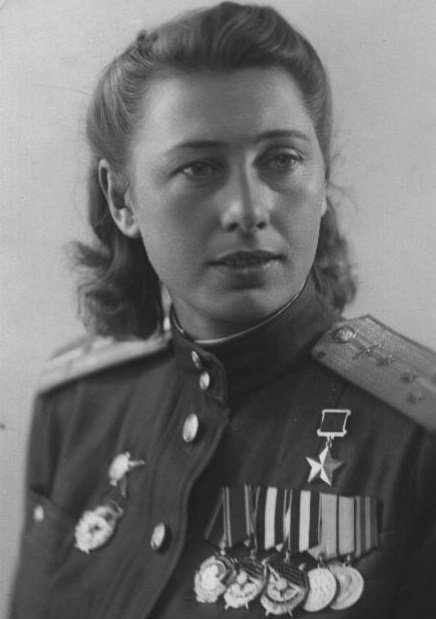
- Born: 25 December 1917; Moscow, Russian SFSR
- Died: 6 October 1958 (aged 40); Moscow, Russian SFSR, Soviet Union
- Military career
- Allegiance: Soviet Union
- Branch: Soviet Air Force
- Service years: 1941—1956
- Rank: Lieutenant Colonel
- Unit: 125th Guards Bomber Aviation Regiment
- Conflicts: World War II
- Awards: Hero of the Soviet Union

Klavdia Yakovlevna Fomicheva (Note: Transliteration of her maiden "Фомичёва" varies by different systems. Her married name was Levashova) (Russian: Клавдия Яковлевна Фомичёва; 25 December 1917 – 6 October 1958) was a squadron commander in the 125th Guards Dive Bomber Regiment during the Second World War who was awarded the title Hero of the Soviet Union on 18 August 1945.

== Early years ==
Fomicheva was born in Moscow, but spent her entire childhood in Znamenka village (Dankovsky District, Lipetsk Oblast). Her father died in a year after her birth and later her elder brother Valentin, who was the primary breadwinner of the family after father's death, also died, so the family suffered severe material hardships.

In 1931 after graduating from a seven-year comprehensive school she was hired as a bookkeeper's apprentice while studying in a banking school. Upon graduation she became an accounting associate in the Gosbank. She took pleasure in hiking, mountaineering and other sports. In 1936 Fomicheva joined glider club. Her skills were so good in it that she was invited to participate at the paramilitary flying club. By 1938 she was qualified as a flight instructor and in 1938-1941 trained young people in a flying club in Reutov.

== Military career ==
=== Second World War ===
On 22 June 1941, the first day the Third Reich invaded the USSR, Fomicheva volunteered for the frontline flying service and was accepted by the 122nd Aviation Group - a special women's unit (Note: The 122nd Aviation Group consisted of the 586th Fighter Aviation Regiment, 587th Bombardment Aviation Regiment (redesignated 125th Borisov Guards Bombardment Aviation regiment) and 588th Night Bomber Regiment (redesignated 46th Taman Guards Night Bombardment Aviation Regiment). All units initially had all-female personnel, but the first two eventually became mixed with a preponderance of females. All three units became operational upon integration into regular VVS divisions where other regiments had all-male aircrew.) under the command of Marina Raskova. Initially, she opted to train as a fighter pilot but Raskova, after examination of her abilities, decided to assign her to the 587th Bombardment Aviation Regiment, intended to operate the Sukhoi Su-2 light bomber. The regiment later received the Guards designation and was renamed the 125th Guards Dive Bomber Regiment. She took her military and tactical training in the Engels Military Flying School in the Saratov Oblast. The unit ended up using Petlyakov Pe-2 bombers instead of Sukhoi Su-2 light bombers. By January 1943, when the 587th first engaged in combat, Fomicheva was a flight commander and the vice-commander of her squadron. Later she took command of the squadron.

On 17 September 1943, Fomicheva's aircraft was damaged by enemy flak and her face was wounded by fragments of the cockpit's glazing. Since her navigator was severely wounded and incapable of bailing out, Fomicheva could not leave the aircraft and had to land it on the airfield of a Soviet fighter unit near the frontline. There was an aircraft on the main runway, so she made the landing beside the main runway. When the landing run a wheel of Fomicheva's aircraft got into a bomb crater, the plane nosed-over and caught fire. Fomicheva suffered severe injuries (including fractures in six ribs) and burns. Airfield personnel helped the crew escape the burning aircraft. By January 1944, Fomicheva recovered from her injuries and resumed flying.

On 23 June 1944, in the second sortie of the day, Fomicheva's aircraft was hit by enemy flak when approaching the target, setting the left engine aflame and killing her gunner. Fomicheva herself had her leg severely wounded but continued the mission and dropped the bombs on the target. She then turned the burning aircraft back towards the frontline to avoid capture by the enemy, flying until she got over friendly territory. She bailed out at an altitude of no more than 200 meters, but not before making sure that her navigator Galina Dzhunkovskaya successfully parachuted to safety. Both she and Dzhunkovskaya suffered serious burns. On 15 July 1944, Fomicheva resumed flying.

By December 1944, Fomicheva had flown 55 combat missions with 46,750 kg of bombs dropped. Her subordinates and superiors appreciated her performance as a pilot and as a squadron commander, as she was instrumental in a number of instances in reducing or preventing losses of aircrew. She also was responsible for missions critical for the success of ground forces' operations by destroying valuable enemy assets and targets On 23 December 1944 Fomicheva's command recommended her for the title of the Hero of Soviet Union, which she received on 18 August 1945.

=== Postwar ===
After the war Fomicheva served as an instructor at the Air Force Academy and later at Borisoglebsk Military Flying School. By 1955 she retired with the rank of lieutenant-colonel, but she died only a few years later on 6 October 1958 after a prolonged illness that left her bedridden; she was buried in the Novodevichy Cemetery.

== Involvement in politics ==
Fomicheva became a member of the Communist Party in 1944, and in 1945 she participated in the founding Women's International Democratic Federation congress in Paris.

== Awards and decorations ==
- Hero of the Soviet Union (18 August 1945)
- Order of Lenin (18 August 1945)
- Two Orders of the Red Banner (5 September 1943 and 28 June 1944)
- Order of the Red Star (4 May 1943)
- Medal "For Battle Merit" (19 November 1951)

Campaign medals
- Medal "For the Defence of Stalingrad"
- Medal "For the Defence of the Caucasus"
- Medal "For the Capture of Königsberg"
- Medal "For the Victory over Germany in the Great Patriotic War 1941–1945"

== Memory ==
Streets in Moscow and Dankov are named after Fomicheva.

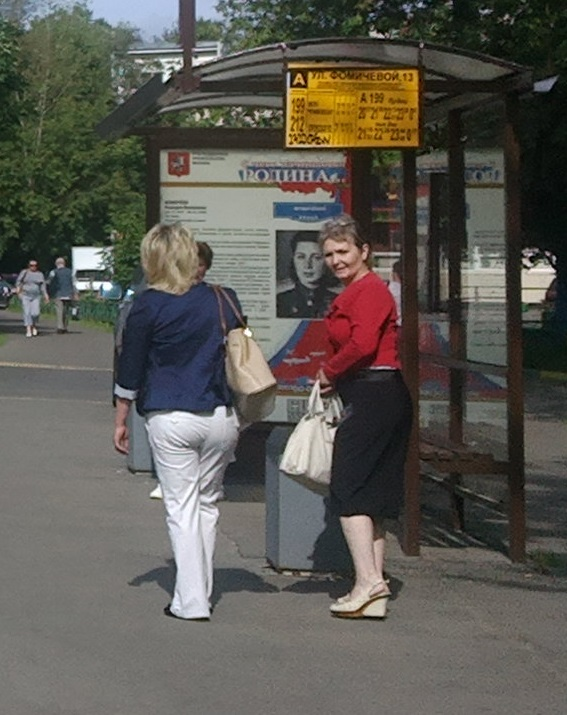
A bus stop with a portrait of Klavdia Fomicheva on Fomichevoy Street, Moscow

== Bibliography ==
- Cottam, Kazimiera (1998). Women in War and Resistance: Selected Biographies of Soviet Women Soldiers. Newburyport, MA: Focus Publishing/R. Pullins Co. ISBN 1-58510-160-5.
- Kazarinova, Militsa; Polyantseva, Agniya (1962). В небе фронтовом. Сборник воспоминаний советских летчиц-участниц Великой Отечественной войны [In the sky of the frontline. Collection of memoirs of Soviet pilots participating in the Great Patriotic War] (in Russian). Moscow: Molodaya gvardiya. OCLC 749039156.
- Simonov, Andrey; Chudinova, Svetlana (2017). Женщины - Герои Советского Союза и России [Women – Heroes of the Soviet Union and Russia]. Moscow: Russian Knights Foundation and Museum of Technology Vadim Zadorozhny. ISBN 9785990960701. OCLC 1019634607.
