= Valentin Markov =

Soviet army leader, lieutenant general of air force

- Native name: Валентин Васильевич Марков
- Nickname: "Bayonet"
- Born: 21 January 1910; Pakhomovo village, Moscow Governorate, Russian Empire
- Died: 1 July 1992 (aged 82) Moscow, Russian Federation
- Allegiance: Soviet Union
- Branch: Soviet Air Force
- Service years: 1927–1968
- Rank: General-lieutenant of Aviation
- Conflicts: World War II; Winter War; Eastern Front; Soviet–Japanese War
- Awards: Order of Lenin (2x)
- Spouse: Galina Dzhunkovskaya

Valentin Vasilevich Markov (Russian: Валентин Васильевич Марков; 21 January 1910 – 1 July 1992) was the Soviet Air Force officer posted to command the women's 587th Bomber Aviation Regiment (later honored with the guards designation and renamed as the 125th Guards Bomber Aviation Regiment) after the death of its original commanding officer and founder, Marina Raskova.

== Early life ==
Markov was born on 21 January 1910 to a Russian family in Pakhomovo village, located in the present-day Moscow oblast. Before joining the military in October 1927 he worked at a factory, and upon enlistment he trained at the 1st Soviet Joint Military School and subsequently the 2nd Military Aviation School of Pilots, which he graduated from in 1933; in 1938 he was admitted to the Communist Party. Later he took part in combat during the Winter War for which he was awarded the Medal "For Courage" and an Order of Lenin.

== World War II ==
Immediately after the German invasion of the Soviet Union, Markov was deployed to the frontlines of the conflict. In 1942 he was posted to command the 723rd Bomber Aviation Regiment, and on 26 May that year his plane was hit by enemy fire during a sortie. Seriously wounded in the burning plane, he nevertheless managed to reach Soviet-controlled territory before parachuting out and hitting the ground unconscious. As a result of his injuries he was hospitalized and out of combat for some time.

=== Women's regiment ===
On 4 January 1943, Marina Raskova and several of her colleagues were killed when the Pe-2 she was ferrying to the frontlines crashed in poor weather conditions. Raskova, who had used her political connections to establish three women's aviation regiments had been commander of the dive bomber one (the 587th Bomber Aviation Regiment) at the time. During the brief void deputy commander Yevgeniya Timofeeva took over, but she did not feel confident about holding the role, and had no desire to continue doing so. In the end, Markov was chosen from a pool of potential candidates due to his experience with the Pe-2.

General Nikitin asked Markov to accept the post of regimental commander; initially Markov declined, only to be told that papers for his transfer had already been signed. Frustrated and annoyed, he conversed with his friends who also expressed dismay at the post. When he arrived to his new post, the aviators were conducting a sortie, giving him the opportunity to watch them land their complex Pe-2 aircraft safely before calling for the regiment to formation for a speech in which he stated his intentions to improve discipline and maintain high expectations; the women were offended by the contents of the speech, as they felt they already had good discipline and considered themselves experienced pilots. In addition, the idea that a man would command the regiment was unthinkable to many of the women, who mourned Raskova and couldn't imagine anyone except her commanding them. Initially, the women referred to him as "bayonet" behind his back, an unsavory nickname chosen because of his tall and thin stature and stern expressions. However, attitudes changed over time, and soon earned their trust as a competent commander, and the hostility subsided by summer 1943.

Despite being regimental commander, he often participated in combat missions, joining as a Pe-2 pilot. In September 1943 the regiment was honored with the Guards designation and became as the 125th Guards Bomber Aviation Regiment named after M.M. Raskova. Later in November that year he was awarded the Order of Suvorov 3rd class for excellence in leadership of the regiment and completing 42 sorties, and in July 1944 the unit was honored with the "Borisov" name addition (rendering the unit name into the 125th Borisov Guards Bomber Aviation Regiment named after M. Raskova) in recognition of the regiment's feats in the liberation of the city of Borisov. However, he left the regiment in March 1945 for the post of deputy flight commander of the 326th Bomber Aviation Division and was replaced by Semyon Titenko.

=== Remainder of war ===
No longer in command of the 125th Bomber Aviation Regiment, Markov helped lead pilots under his command in the division through the battles for Königsberg and Berlin, for which he was awarded an Order of the Red Banner in May 1945. He then served as acting commander of the division and supervised its redeployment to the Russian Far East, where it was stationed during the subsequent war with Japan. During the Soviet-Japanese war, Markov himself made three combat sorties, bringing his total to 75 sorties in the course of World War II, for which he was awarded an Order of the Patriotic War in October 1945.

== Later life ==
Markov remained in the air force after the end of the war, and became the official commander of the 326th Bomber Aviation Division in 1948. He remained commander of the division until 1950; later he went on to graduate from the Military Academy of General Staff and become a general-lieutenant before eventually retiring from the military in 1968.

=== Personal life ===
Upon the end of the war with Germany, Markov confessed his love for Galina Dzhunkovskaya, a squadron navigator he had frequently flown with during the war. While they interacted with each other on a strictly formal basis as military personnel during the war, the two grew to develop feelings for each other, something that other members of the regiment suspected and was confirmed to many after Markov personally helped carry Galina when she had been badly burned in a combat mission. The couple married soon after the war, and later had two children, Viktor and Natalya. The family moved frequently due to Valentin's military career, residing in Kirovgrad, Belaya Tserkov, Moscow, Ivanovo, Manzovka, and Blagoveshchensk before eventually settling in Moscow in 1961, where he died on 1 July 1992 and was buried next to Galina in the Kuntsevo cemetery.

== Awards ==
- Two Order of Lenin (21 March 1940 and 15 November 1950)
- Five Order of the Red Banner (1 July 1943, 10 June 1944, 10 May 1945, 30 April 1947, 30 December 1956)
- Order of Suvorov 3rd class (7 November 1943)
- Two Order of the Patriotic War 1st class (13 October 1945 and 1985 jubilee medal)
- Order of the Red Star (3 November 1944)
- Order of the Badge of Honour (24 November 1966)
- Medal "For Courage" (1 January 1940)
- campaign, service, and jubilee medals

== See also ==
- Aleksandr Gridnev
