= Yurkovka =

Yurkovka Юрковка
- Village
- Location within Bashkortostan Location within Russia
- Coordinates: 53°03′N 55°05′E
- Country: Russia
- Region: Bashkortostan
- District: Fyodorovsky District
- Time zone: UTC+5:00

Yurkovka (Russian: Юрковка) is a rural locality (a village) in Dedovsky Selsoviet, Fyodorovsky District, Bashkortostan, Russia. The population was 176 as of 2010. There are 2 streets.

== Geography ==
Yurkovka is located 16 km southwest of Fyodorovka (the district's administrative centre) by road. Novaya Derevnya is the nearest rural locality.
