= Yevgeniya Timofeeva =

Pilot in the Soviet Air Force

Yevgeniya Dmitrievna Timofeeva
- Евгения Дмитриевна Тимофеева
- Born: 23 December 1911; Pyanitsyno village, Vladimir Governorate, Russian Empire
- Died: 13 June 1992 (aged 80); Vinnytsia, Ukraine
- Military career
- Allegiance: Soviet Union
- Branch: Soviet Air Force
- Rank: Major
- Unit: 125th Guards Bomber Aviation Regiment
- Conflicts: World War II
- Awards: Order of the Red Banner

Yevgeniya Dmitrievna Timofeeva (Russian: Евгения Дмитриевна Тимофеева; 23 December 1911 – 13 June 1992) was a pilot in the Soviet Air Force during World War II, and the first woman to fly the Pe-2 dive bomber. As a member of the 587th Bomber Aviation Regiment, later redesignated as the 125th Guards Bomber Aviation Regiment named after Marina Raskova, she initially served as a squadron commander but was later promoted to deputy regimental commander during the war. By the end of the war she totaled 45 sorties on the Pe-2.

== Awards ==
- Two Order of the Red Banner (1943 and 1945)
- Two Order of the Patriotic War (1st class - 1943; 2nd class - 1985)
- campaign and jubilee medals
