= 125th Guards Bomber Aviation Regiment =

- 125-й гвардейский бомбардировочный авиаполк
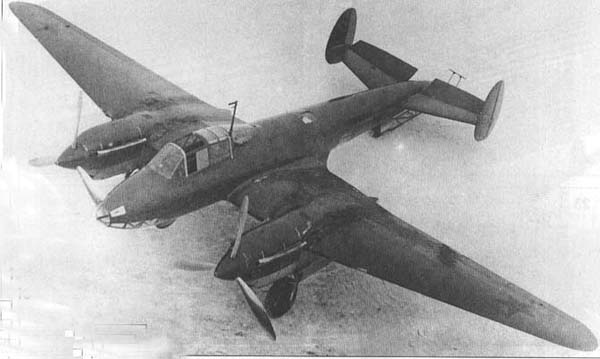
- A Soviet-made Petlyakov Pe-2 dive bomber, the aircraft used by the regiment
- Active: 1943–1945
- Country: Soviet Union
- Branch: Soviet Air Force
- Engagements: Eastern Front of World War II
- Decorations: Guards designation; Order of the Red Banner; Order of Suvorov

Commanders
- Commander: Marina Raskova (until 1943); Valentin Markov (1943-1945); Semyon Titenko (1945)
- Deputy Commander: Yevgeniya Timofeeva
- Commissar: Lina Yeliseyeva (until 1944); Mariya Abramova (1944-1945); Mariya Lapunova

Aircraft flown
- Bomber: Petlyakov Pe-2

The 125th Borisov Guards Bomber Aviation Regiment named after Marina Raskova (Russian: 125-й гвардейский бомбардировочный авиационный Борисовский полк имени М. Расковой, romanized: 125-y gvardeyskiy bombardirovochnyy aviatsionnyy Borisovskiy polk imeni M. Raskovoy) was one of the three Soviet women's aviation regiments founded by Marina Raskova at the start of the Second World War. The unit was founded as the 587th Bomber Aviation Regiment in the 223rd Bomber Air Division, 2nd Bomber Aviation Corps of the 16th Air Army on 8 October 1941, and later honored with the guards designation, being renamed 125th Guards Bomber Aviation Regiment in September 1943 and reorganized into 4th Guards Bomber Aviation Division, 1st Bomber Aviation Corps, 3rd Air Army, in the 1st Baltic Front. Unlike the 46th Taman Guards Night Bomber Aviation Regiment, which used Polikarpov Po-2 utility aircraft, the unit was assigned modern Petlyakov Pe-2 aircraft, which caused some resentment among male units that had older aircraft. Throughout the course of the war, the unit flew 1,134 missions and dropped over 980 tons of bombs on the Axis.

== Notable members ==
Five members of the unit were awarded the title of Hero of the Soviet Union for their service in the war: Mariya Dolina, Galina Dzhunkovskaya, Nadezhda Fedutenko, Klavdia Fomicheva, and Antonina Zubkova. After the dissolution of the Soviet Union one member of the regiment, Valentina Kravchenko, was awarded the title Hero of the Russian Federation in 1995. In addition, navigator Galina Brok-Beltsova became the last living member of the women's aviation units founded by Raskova.
