= Andrey Simonov =

Russian aviation historian (born 1971)

- Андрей Анатольевич Симонов
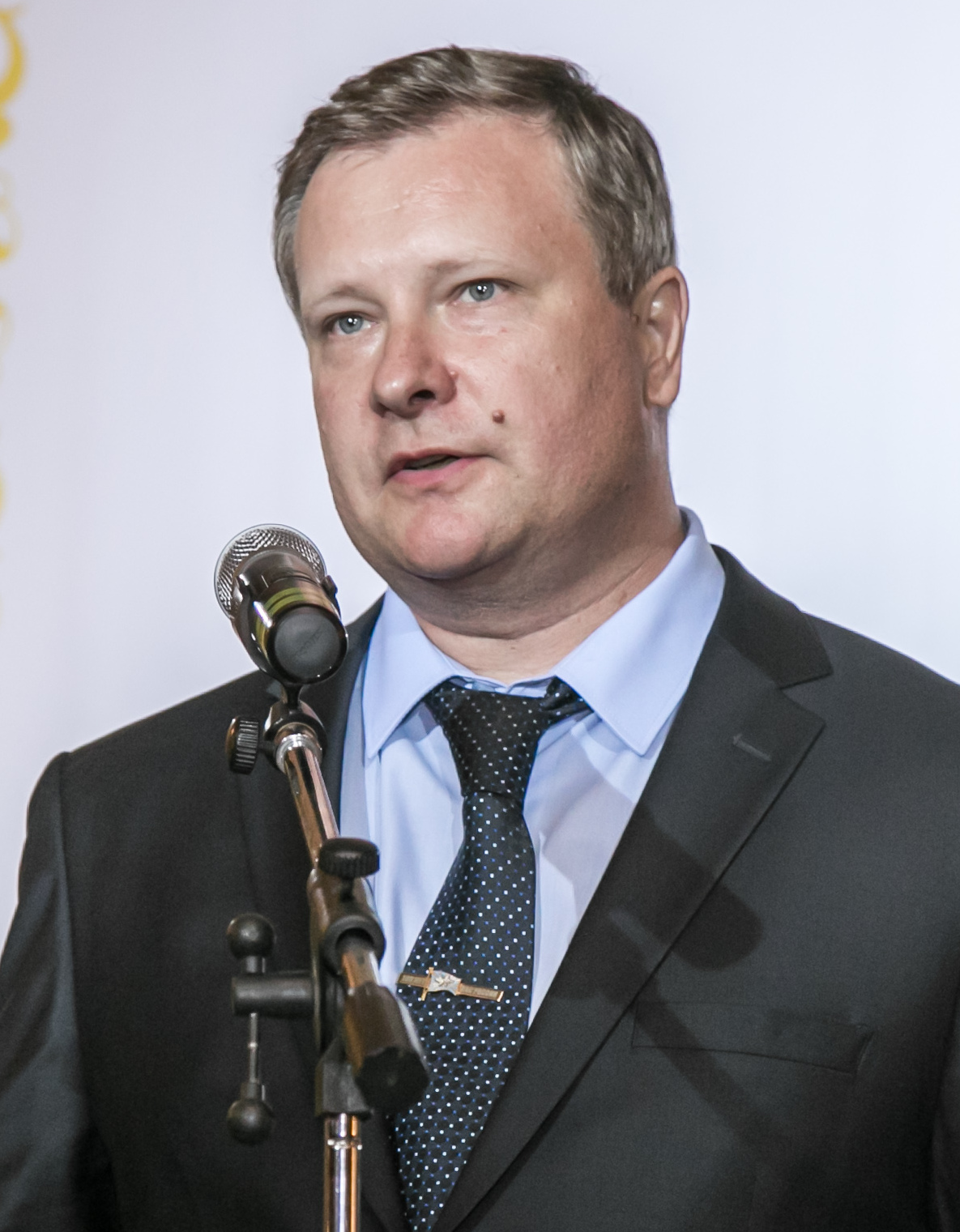
- Born: 30 July 1971 (age 55); Grozny, Chechen-Ingush ASSR, RSFSR, USSR
- Occupations: historian, writer
- Writing career
- Notable awards: Alexander Nevsky Literary Prize

Andrey Anatolevich Simonov (Russian: Андрей Анатольевич Симонов; Born 30 July 1971) is a Russian aviation historian. In addition to contributing to Russian Wikipedia on the subject, he has written several books and encyclopedias about Soviet aviation in World War II and the development of aviation in the USSR. He was one of the few members of the Russian delegation invited to the premiere of the movie Haytarma, a film about twice Hero of the Soviet Union Amet-khan Sultan, who chose to attend.

== Books (partial list) ==
- Испытатели МиГов. Zhukovsky: Aviation Printing House. 1999.
- Испытатели ЛИИ. Zhukovsky: Aviation Printing House. 2001. ISBN 5937050088. OCLC 51916071.
- Герои Советского Союза, Герои Российской Федерации и полные кавалеры ордена Славы Северного административного округа Москвы. Moscow: Encyclopedia of Russian villages. 2003. ISBN 5883670032. OCLC 34737108.
- Командующие воздушными армиями. Moscow: Patriot. 2006. ISBN 5703009375. OCLC 78990192.
- Заслуженные испытатели СССР. Moscow: Aviamir. 2009. ISBN 9785904399054. OCLC 705999921.
- Помним всех поимённо…. Akhtubinsk. 2010.
- История отечественной авиапромышленности. Серийное самолётостроение, 1910–2010 гг. Moscow: Rusavia. 2011. ISBN 9785900078663. OCLC 931363495.
- Московский некрополь Героев. Герои Советского Союза. Том 1. А–И. Vol. 1. Moscow: Tipografiya «Novosti». 2011. ISBN 9785881495381. OCLC 879488799.
- Московский некрополь Героев. Герои Советского Союза. Том 2. К–О. Vol. 2. Moscow: Tipografiya «Novosti». 2013. ISBN 9785000280096. OCLC 879449011.
- Заслуженные испытатели СССР (in Russian). 2015. ISBN 9785990603691. OCLC 928459552.
- Страницы истории Лётно-исследовательского института. Moscow: BukyVedi. 2016.
- Simonov, Andrey; Chudinova, Svetlana (2017). Женщины – Герои Советского Союза и России. Moscow: Russian Knights Foundation and Vadim Zadorozhny Museum of Technology. ISBN 9785990960701. OCLC 1019634607.
- Боевые лётчики – дважды и трижды Герои Советского Союза. Moscow: Russian Knights Foundation and Vadim Zadorozhny Museum of Technology. 2017. ISBN 9785990960510. OCLC 1005741956.
