= Nina Solovey =

Soviet military sniper

- Нина Сергеевна Соловей
- Born: 9 November 1917; Moscow
- Died: 19 April 2006 (aged 88)
- Military career
- Allegiance: Soviet Union
- Branch: Red Army
- Service years: 1941–1962
- Rank: Captain
- Conflicts: World War II
- Awards: Order of Glory

Nina Sergeevna Solovey (Russian: Нина Сергеевна Соловей; 9 November 1917 – 19 April 2006) was a female sniper and scout in the Red Army during World War II. She is credited with up to 64 kills of enemy soldiers and after the war she became the chairman of the council of veterans of the Central Women's Sniper Training School. She was a very close friend and mentor of Azerbaijani sniper Ziba Ganiyeva.

== Prewar ==
Solovey was born on 9 November 1917 to a Russian family and grew up in Moscow. After completing secondary school and factory apprenticeship school she worked at the aircraft factory named after S.P. Gorbunov. She was the Komsomol organizer of the workshop.

== World War II ==
After the German invasion of the Soviet Union, Solovey volunteered to join the Red Army and initially served in the intelligence section of the 3rd Moscow Communist Division, which later became the 53rd Guards Rifle Division. The commander of her company was Hero of the Soviet Union Nikolai Berendeev. It was there that she met many other women soldiers and became friends with Ziba Ganiyeva. Because Ganiyeva was younger than her and new to living in Moscow, Solovey mentoured her taught her how to ski, which became useful in the war. She and Ganiyeva went on to go on "hunting" missions with Heroes of the Soviet Union Natalya Kovshova and Mariya Polivanova. In February 1943 during a mission in Novgorod Solovey was badly wounded. After undergoing treatment for the injury in Yaroslavl she became a student at the Central Women's Sniper Training School in Moscow and formally became a sniper. She also trained on the use of a machine gun. Solovey was chosen to undergo training in an instructor company and was given command of a group of 16 women snipers of the 90th Guards Rifle Division after graduating. When she was a platoon commander in the 1119th Rifle Regiment she was awarded the Order of Glory for killing 15 Nazis. Later that year she was badly wounded near Daugavpils. Her friends carried her off the battlefield on a stretcher, but it was not until 1945 that she was released from the hospital, and due to the extent of her injuries she was unable to return to her unit. Galina Kievskaya claimed that Solovey killed 42 enemy soldiers, but Ivan Yevteev claimed that she killed 64 enemy soldiers.

== Postwar ==
After recovering from her injuries she studied at the Military Institute of Foreign Languages, graduating in 1947 and remained in the military until 1962. From 1963 to 1992 she worked at a factory as the editor of the factory radio program. From 1970 to 1980 she was chairman of the council of veterans of the Central Women's Sniper Training School. She died on 19 April 2006

== Awards ==
- Order of Glory 3rd class (18 March 1944)
- Order of the Red Star (22 October 1942)
- Order of the Patriotic War 1st class (11 March 1985)
- Medal "For Courage" (20 March 1944)
