= Nadezhda Zhurkina =

Russian radio operator, gunner (1920–2002)

Nadezhda Aleksandrovna Zhurkina
- Надежда Александровна Журкина
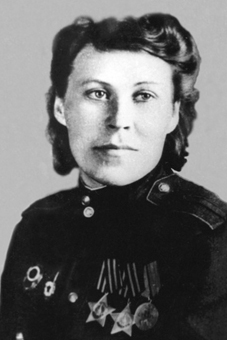
- Born: 28 August 1920; Turinsk, Russian SFSR
- Died: 24 April 2002 (aged 82); Moscow, Russia
- Military career
- Allegiance: Soviet Union
- Branch: Soviet Air Force
- Service years: 1942–1945
- Rank: Starshina
- Unit: 99th Separate Guards Reconnaissance Aviation Regiment
- Conflicts: World War II
- Awards: Order of Glory (1st, 2nd and 3rd class)

Nadezhda Aleksandrovna Zhurkina (Russian: Надежда Александровна Журкина; 28 August 1920 – 24 April 2002) was a radio operator and gunner in the 99th Guards Separate Reconnaissance Aviation Regiment during the Second World War and one of only four women to be awarded all three classes of the Order of Glory.

== Early life ==
Zhurkina was born on 28 August 1920 to a working-class Russian family in Turinsk. Before joining the military in 1942 she studied at the Moscow Law Institute and had graduated from flight courses at the Moscow Aeroclub where she became certified to pilot a Po-2. After both of her brothers who were in the military died in combat shortly after the start of the war and inspired by the leadership of Marina Raskova, she sought to join the military. In 1944 she became a member of the Communist Party.

== Military career ==
Not long after the German invasion of the Soviet Union in 1941, Zhurkina joined the Red Army in 1942 and worked at an interception station but requested to be retrained as an air-gunner in 1943. Her regimental commander approved the transfer and after only a few days of training she had become skilled in the use of the aircraft's machine gun. She soon saw her baptism by fire in the Battle of Kursk, providing information on the locations and movements of enemy tank units and troop formations in addition to providing cover for Soviet ground troops by fending off enemy aircraft. On 23 July 1943 she opened fire on two Fw 190 fighters to defend the plane during a reconnaissance mission. As a result, they were able to report on the movement of troops in the Orel area. After her first five sorties she was awarded the Medal "For Courage", as she had often found herself shooting at enemy planes while transmitting reconnaissance information. From 4 March to 2 April 1944 she flew 23 reconnaissance sorties over the Pskov Oblast, Pushkinskiye Gory, Opochka, and Idritsa, in which she took photographs of enemy of facilities, transmitted information from the plane to the ground, and repulsed attacks from nine enemy fighters. For her bravery shown in those actions she was awarded her first Order of Glory on 30 April 1944.

From 16 September to October that same year she flew fifteen reconnaissance and bombing sorties over Riga, Tukums, and Klapkalns in Latvia. In those missions she transmitted 93 messages to the ground about enemy positions and the movements of supply shipments, personnel, and aircraft in addition to fending off multiple attacks by enemy fighters. On 15 October she was awarded the Order of Glory in the second class.

In November 1944 Zhurkina was assigned the difficult task of photographing enemy defenses over the city of Kuldīga, Latvia. The flight was conducted in poor weather, causing Zhurkina's plane to fly at a dangerously low altitude of 500 meters, where she would face bombardment from Axis artillery fire. After photographing the area and turning back to the airfield Zhurkina's plane was bombarded by four Focke-Wulf Fw 190 fighters on her third approach, but she managed to fend them off after shooting one down and shooting at another enough that it was forced to turn back from the damage caused. The mission, which involved flying six passes over the military fortifications, was conducted on Pe-2. After the first flyover she fended off two German fighters, but after the second flyover the plane was forced to head back to the airbase before the next flyover. Before the third flyover when she managed to shoot down one fighter, she had suspected that a pair of fighters would attack, one from below and one from above, so she asked the navigator to take control of the upper machine gun while she operated the lower gun. On her first shot she ruptured the fuel tank of a Messerschmitt and shot at another, causing the remaining aircraft to disengage the attack. On a mission on 18 November 1944 she fired upon two planes, fending them off from her plane. For her actions in those engagements she was awarded the Order of Glory 1st class by decree of the Supreme Soviet on 23 February 1948. She was never shot down during the war nor did she sustain any major injuries. In addition to the Order of Glory she was also awarded the Order of the Red Star. In total she flew 67 sorties, engaged in 30 dogfights, and shot down one enemy plane.

== Later life ==
After the end of the war she left the military and worked as the personnel director of a clothing factory in Riga. She led an active social life and was a member of "War Veterans for Peace". After the dissolution of the Soviet Union she moved to Russia and was not able to bring much with her, but did bring all her war photo albums and address book of fellow veterans with her. From then on she lived in a boarding house for veterans of the Second World War in Moscow until she died in 2002 at the age of 82.

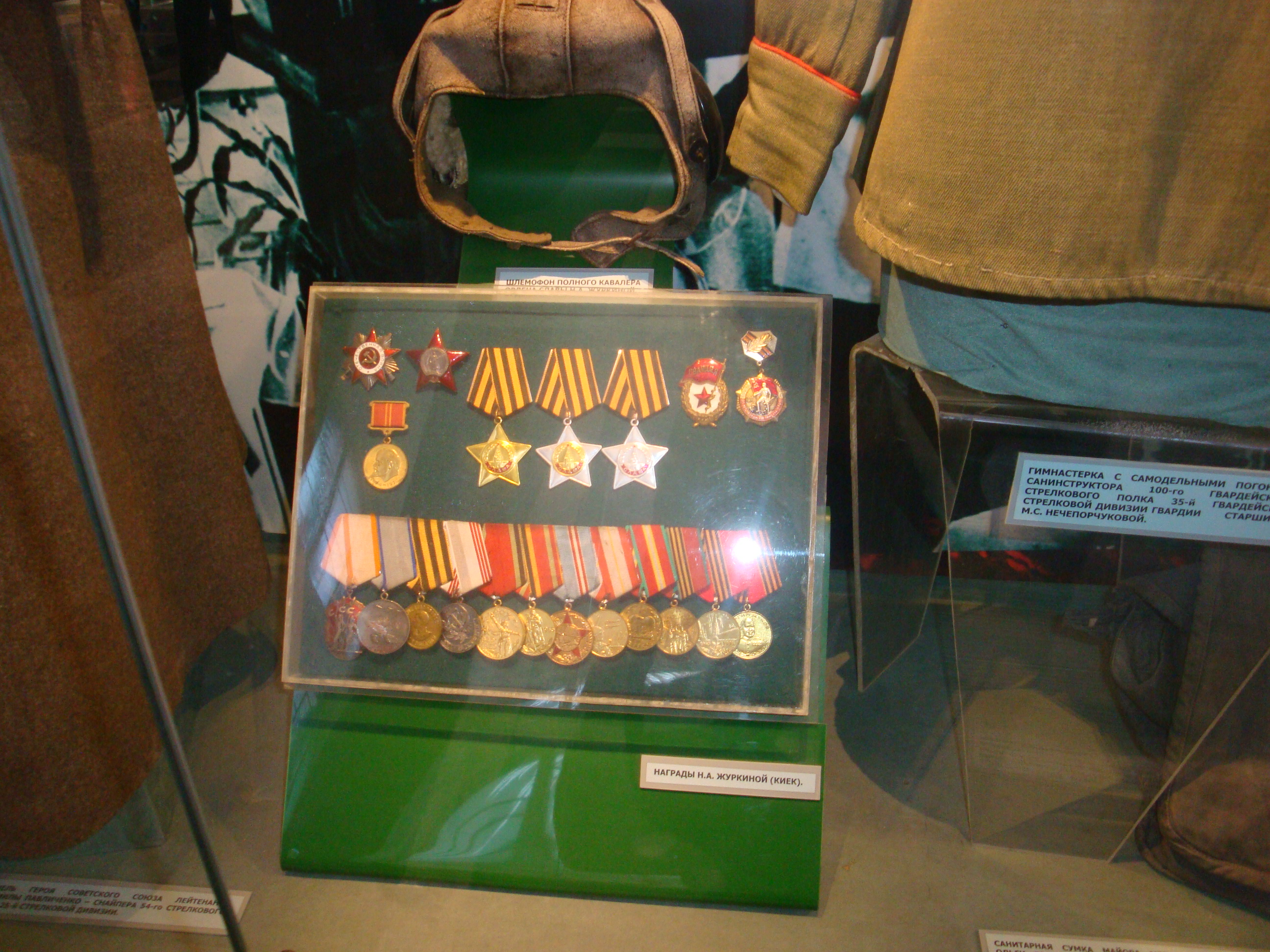
Zhurkina's medals in a museum

== Awards and honors ==
- Three Order of Glory (1st class – 23 February 1948, 2nd class – 5 November 1944, 3rd class – 30 April 1944)
- Order of the Patriotic War 1st class (11 March 1985)
- Order of Friendship (1 October 1993)
- Order of the Red Star (30 April 1945)
- Medal "For Courage" (28 July 1943)
- Order of the Badge of Honor (5 April 1971)
- campaign and jubilee medals

== See also ==
- Matrena Necheporchukova
- Danute Staneliene
- Nina Petrova
