= Ziba Ganiyeva =

Soviet sniper (1923–2010)

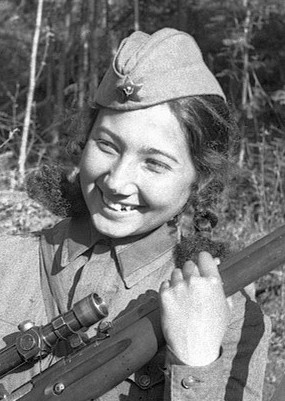
- Born: 20 August 1923; Shamakhi (Note: Other sources indicate Shymkent or Guliston)
- Died: 2010 (aged 86–87); Moscow, Russia
- Military career
- Allegiance: Soviet Union
- Branch: Red Army
- Rank: Junior lieutenant
- Conflicts: World War II
- Awards: Order of the Red Banner

Ziba Pasha qizi Ganiyeva (Azerbaijani: Ziba Paşa qızı Qəniyeva; Russian: Зиба Пашаевна Ганиева; 20 August 1923 – 2010) was a Soviet sniper, reconnaissance scout, and radio operator in the Red Army. She killed at least 20 enemy soldiers in World War II. After the war, she starred in a movie and became a philologist.

== Early life ==
Ziba Ganiyeva was born to an ethnic Azerbaijani father and ethnic Uzbek mother. Sources vary widely on her place of birth; most indicate that she was born in Shamakhi, but the Azerbaijani Soviet Encyclopedia said that she was born in Guliston, Verchernyaya Moskva said she was born in Uzbekistan, and the Podvig naroda database says that she was born in Shymkent. In 1937 during the Great Purge her mother was arrested, so her father had her sent away from home for her own safety. She soon relocated to Tashkent, where she entered the newly formed choreographic department of the Uzbek Philharmonia. She then moved to Moscow in 1940 and began attending the Lunacharsky State Institute for Theatre Arts.

== World War II ==
=== Combat path ===
In 1941 after the German invasion of the Soviet Union, Ganiyeva volunteered to join and Red Army and served in the 3rd Moscow Communist Rifle Division. She underwent very brief training in sharpshooting, using a machine gun, and reconnaissance, and actively promoted the sniper movement. She quickly became friends with other women soldiers in the division, and she became close friends with Nina Solovey, On 7 November 1941 she marched in the famous Red Army parade. In January 1942 the 3rd Moscow Communist Rifle Division became the 130th Rifle Division, and Ganiyeva became a sniper in the 151st Separate Motorized Rifle Reconnaissance battalion.

During the war she participated in missions with Heroes of the Soviet Union Natalya Kovshova and Mariya Polivanova. In addition to serving as a sniper she work as a radio operator on reconnaissance missions, and crossed into enemy territory 16 times during the winter of 1941.

On 23 May 1942 she distinguished herself in the battle for Bolshoe Vragovo village in Maryovsky District. During the battle she and several of her fellow snipers organized fire on a group of enemy soldiers retreating after being attacked by a tank platoon. During the ensuing battle they were attached by an enemy machine gunner stationed in a ruined building. Ziba and a fellow soldier snuck behind the machine gunner and shot him at point blank range. However, she soon was badly wounded by shrapnel from an explosion and her friends Nina Solovey, Fyodor Kirillov, and Yakov Kolyako carried her to a hospital. As she suffered from blood poisoning, she was taken care of by Mariya Shvernik, the wife of politician Nikolai Shvernik. Only eleven months later she was released from the hospital, but she did not engage in combat after her injury. Her highest rank was junior lieutenant.

=== Publicity ===
During the war her photo was featured in Verchernyaya Moskva, Komsomolskaya Pravda, and on the cover of Ogonek magazine. An appeal written by her addressed to mothers of the Caucuses calling on them to support the war effort was published in issue No.19–20 of the magazine Rabotnitsa in 1942.

=== Controversy over number of kills ===
Ganiyeva's exact sniper tally is disputed: her award sheet for the Order of the Red Banner and an issue of the newspaper Vechernyaya Moskva published in June 1942 both credited her with 20 kills, Russian historian Vera Murmantseva credited her with 21 kills, Komsomolskaya Pravda credited her with 28 kills, while Tahir Salahov claimed that she killed 129 fascists.

== Postwar ==
After the war she returned to her theater career and married Soviet diplomat Tofik Kadyrov. She starred in the movie "Tahir and Zuhra" by the Uzbek director Nabi Ganiev as a Persian shahini. From 1955 to 1956 she headed the Department of Language and Literature of the Baku Higher Party School, and in 1956 she became a researcher at Institute of Oriental Studies of the Soviet Academy of Sciences. She received a Candidate of Sciences degree in philology. She died in Moscow in 2010.

== Works ==
- Qorkinin dekadentçiliyə və naturalizmə qarşı mübarizəsi (Gorky's Struggle Against Decadence and Naturalism), "Azərbaycan", 1955, No.6
- О сатире Горького в период первой русской революции (On Gorky's Satire in the First Russian Revolution Period), "Литературный Азербайджан", 1955, No.12
- Страницы из истории революционной поэзии на урду (Pages from the History of Revolutionary Poetry in Urdu), "Народы Азии и Африки", 1970, No.2

== See also ==
- Aliya Moldagulova
