= Matryona Necheporchukova =

Matryona Semyonovna Necheporchukova
- Матрёна Семёновна Нечепорчукова
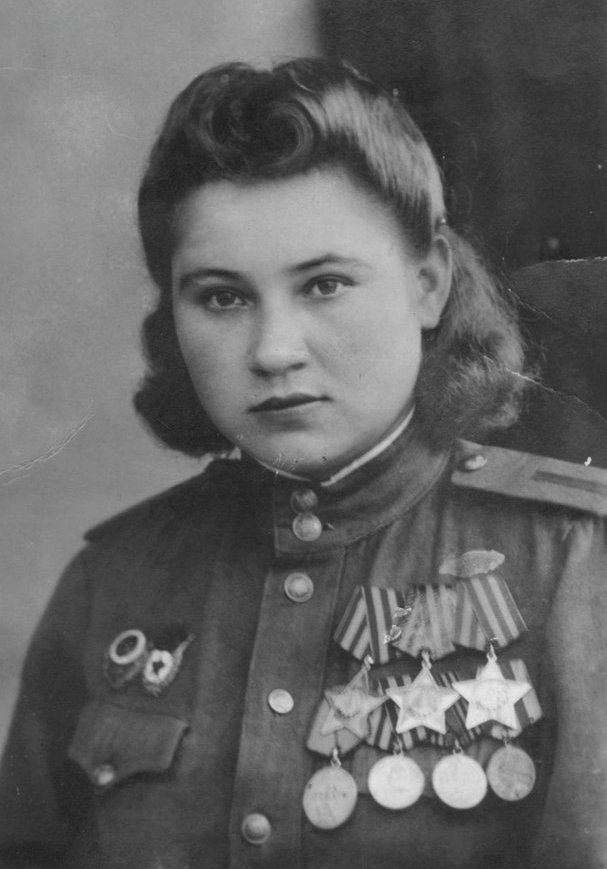
- Necheporchukova in 1945
- Born: 3 April 1924; Volchiy Yar, Zmiyevskoy uezd, Kharkov Governorate, Ukrainian SSR
- Died: 22 March 2017 (aged 92); Stavropol, Russian Federation
- Military career
- Allegiance: Soviet Union
- Branch: Red Army Medical Service
- Service years: 1943–1945
- Rank: Starshina
- Units: 100th Guards Rifle Regiment, 35th Guards Rifle Division
- Conflicts: World War II
- Awards: Order of Glory, 1st Class; Medal "For Courage"; Florence Nightingale Medal

Matryona Semyonovna Nazdracheva, née Necheporchukova (Russian: Матрёна Семёновна Нечепорчукова; 3 April 1924 – 22 March 2017) was a combat medic in Red Army who rescued 250 wounded soldiers and officers during World War II. On 15 May 1946 she was awarded the Order of Glory 1st Class and became one of only four women to receive all three classes of that order.

== Early life ==
Necheporchukova was born in the village of Volchiy Yar to a Ukrainian peasant family. After her parents died in 1933 she lived in a local boarding school, and in 1939 she completed her seventh grade of school, marking the end of her secondary education, but after graduating from the Balakleyevskaya Obstetrical Nursing School she became a nurse. She had wanted to join the ranks of the Red Army sooner, but the Nazis occupied the Kharkhov area (where she lived) soon after the start of the war, and before that the Red Army initially rejected her because she was too young when the war started.

== Military career ==
Necheporchukova managed to join the Communist Party and enlist in the Red Army as a medic in 1943 shortly after German forces were expelled from her hometown. She was deployed with her regiment to the frontlines in the spring and on her first day of battle she provided first aid to fifteen wounded soldiers. After the Soviet offensive in Kiev she crossed the Dnieper in October with a medical company under heavy enemy fire. After the river crossing she carried the wounded from battle to rafts despite heavy presence of enemy mortar fire, artillery, shelling, and bombing attacks. For nearly a week she continued doing so with little sleep and was soon awarded the Medal "For Courage".

When Soviet forces crossed the Vistula river in Poland on 1 August 1944, Necheporchukova was the first person from her medical company to enter the river and head toward the bridgehead on the west shore, where heavy fighting was already taking place. After the crossing she provided first aid to roughly sixty soldiers, twenty-six of whom she carried off the battlefield to safety in an area where artillery fire could not reach. For doing so she was awarded the Order of Glory 3rd Class later that month.

During the Vistula-Oder offensive in January 1945, she stayed in Radom behind the rest of the unit with several other medics to look after roughly thirty wounded soldiers while waiting for ambulances to pick them up. On 18 January a group of Wehrmacht soldiers that ran past Soviet lines raided the shelter where the injured were staying, but she and the other medics managed to repel the attack. One day later the ambulances arrived and she left to return her regiment. In a separate incident she provided first aid to fifty-one wounded soldiers on the bank of the Oder, twenty-seven of whom were seriously injured. For her actions in Radom and Oder she was awarded the Order of Glory 2nd class.

During the Battle of Berlin as well as the crossings of the Spree and Oder Rivers she carried 78 wounded soldiers off the battlefield under heavy enemy fire, refusing to go to the hospital after sustaining a shrapnel wound to her leg. In Berlin she killed several German soldiers after they began approaching towards the wounded soldiers she was treating. For her actions under heavy fire in those offensives she was awarded her third Order of Glory, making her a full bearer of the award.

== Postwar life ==
After the end of the war she married a fellow veteran, radio operator Viktor Stepanovich Nazdrachev. From 1945 to 1950 she and her husband lived in East Germany before moving to Dmitrievskoe village in Stavropol where they lived from 1950 to 1965, after which they moved to Krasnogvardeyskoye where they lived until 1977. In 1973 she was awarded the Florence Nightingale Medal by the Red Cross for her dedication in the salvation of the wounded during the war. In 1977 she returned to the city of Stavropol, where she lived for the remainder of her life. In 2016 on the date of her 91st birthday she received a phone call from Russian president Vladimir Putin thanking her for her courage in the war. She died on 22 March 2017 and was buried in the Ignatievsky cemetery.

== Awards and honors ==
- Order of Glory (3rd class - 11 August 1944, 2nd class - 13 April 1945, 1st class - 15 May 1946)
- Order of the Patriotic War 1st class (11 March 1985)
- Medal "For Courage" (24 October 1943)
- Florence Nightingale Medal (12 May 1973)
- Honorary citizen of Stavropol
- Campaign and jubilee medals

== See also ==
- Nina Petrova
- Danute Staneliene
- Nadezhda Zhurkina
