= Olga Bordashevskaya =

Soldier in the Red Army during World War II (1919–2002)

- Native name: Ольга Фёдоровна Бордашевская
- Born: 1919
- Died: 29 March 2002 (aged 82–83)
- Allegiance: Soviet Union
- Branch: Red Army
- Rank: Senior sergeant
- Conflicts: World War II
- Awards: Order of Glory, 2nd class

Olga Fyodorvna Kiss née Bordashevskaya (Russian: Ольга Фёдоровна Бордашевская; 1919 – 29 March 2002) was a soldier in the Red Army during World War II, credited as one of the top women snipers in history. By some accounts, she tallied 108 kills, placing her behind only Lyudmila Pavlichenko, Tatyana Kostyrina and Nina Petrova.

== Biography ==
Bersashevskaya was born in 1919 to a Russian family. Before the war she was a student at university in Odessa with dreams of becoming a writer. Upon the German invasion of the Soviet Union she immediately volunteered for the war effort, originally working as a nurse in a field hospital. Later on in the war, she attended the Central Women's Sniper Training School based in Podolsk, graduating and being deployed to the warfront as a sniper in 1944. Her customized rifle, which she nicknamed "Ivan Ivanovich", was a gift from the Komsomol. During her time as a sniper she rapidly accumulated a tally of enemy kills, including ten enemy snipers, and earned promotion to the rank of senior sergeant. However, her last kill was on 10 March 1945, since she was badly wounded by mortar fire days later and left unable to continue fighting. Her cumulative tally is not entirely clear due to lack of specification about final results in award documents, however, it is certainly sizable, with the lowest estimate being from a February 1945 magazine crediting her with 80 kills at the time, while most other sources go by Ivan Vybornyk's statement that she had 108 kills.

After the war she married, taking on her husband's surname. Despite her injuries from the war rendering her classified as a disabled veteran, she did not retire, participating in a long-term voyage of Soviet whalers to Antarctica and later becoming executive secretary of the Soviet Peace Committee. She died on 29 March 2002.

== Awards ==
- Order of Glory 2nd class
- Order of Glory 3rd class
- Medal "For Courage"
- campaign and jubilee medals
