= Nora Chegodayeva =

Nora Pavlovna Chegodayeva
- Born: 1905
- Died: 1971 (aged 65–66)
- Military career
- Allegiance: Soviet Union
- Branch: Red Army
- Conflicts: Spanish Civil War; World War II
- Awards: Order of the Red Banner
- Other work: Interpreter, translator, editor

Nora Pavlovna Chegodayeva (Russian: Нора Павловна Чегодаева; 1905–1971) was a Soviet interpreter and translator. A Red Army officer during World War II, she was one of the organizers of a women's sniper course that became famous after its later reorganization as the Central Women’s Sniper Training School.

== Biography ==
Nora Pavlovna Chegodayeva was born in 1905. Her father was Pavel Chegodayev, a revolutionary and lawyer who would hold several important offices at the People's Commissariat of Justice after the Russian Revolution of 1917.

The young Nora Chegodayeva was well-educated and became fluent in both French and Spanish at an early age. She joined the Red Army to work as a military translator and graduated from the Frunze Military Academy in Moscow.

She volunteered to support the Spanish Republicans during the Spanish Civil War as an interpreter, but also experienced combat and was awarded the Order of the Red Banner.

She continued to serve in the military after returning from Spain and held several assignments after the German invasion of the Soviet Union in World War II. She served in the intelligence on the Volkhov Front and later organized a women's sniper training course that would become famous after its later reorganization as the Central Women’s Sniper Training School, but was recalled from this position soon after in order to assist the Soviet diplomatic service in Havana with her fluent Spanish when the Soviet Union first established diplomatic relations with Cuba in 1943.

She later worked as the editor of the French-language edition of the magazine Novoye Vremya.

She died in 1971.

== Awards ==
- Order of the Red Banner
