= Dryagin =

Dryagin (Russian: Дрягин) is a Russian masculine surname, its feminine counterpart is Dryagina. It may refer to

- Aleksandr Dryagin (born 1972), Russian bandy player
- Vyacheslav Dryagin (1940–2002), Soviet Nordic combined skier
- Irina Dryagina (1921–2017), squadron commissar in the "Night Witches"
