= Yelena Stempkovskaya =

Soviet radio operator (1921–1942)

- Елена Константиновна Стемпковская (Russian); Алена Канстанцінаўна Стампкоўская (Belarusian)
- Born: October 1921; Mazurshchina, Byelorussian SSR
- Died: June 30, 1942 (aged 20); Zimovenka, Russian SFSR, Soviet Union
- Military career
- Allegiance: Soviet Union
- Branch: Infantry
- Service years: 1941–1942
- Rank: Private (Note: Various sources, including the decree on awarding her the title Hero of the Soviet Union published in 1946, mistakenly refer to her as a junior lieutenant)
- Unit: 216th Rifle Regiment
- Conflicts: World War II (executed)
- Awards: Hero of the Soviet Union

Yelena Konstantinovna Stempkovskaya (Russian: Елена Константиновна Стемпковская; Belarusian: Алена Канстанцінаўна Стампкоўская, romanized: Alena Kanstantsinawna Stampkowskaya; October 1921 – 30 June 1942) was a Soviet radio operator in the 216th Rifle Regiment of the Red Army during World War II who was posthumously awarded the title of Hero of the Soviet Union on 15 May 1946.

== Early life ==
Stempkovskaya was born in October 1921 to a Belarusian family in Mazurshchina in the Minsk region. Born and raised in the Byelorussian SSR, she completed her seventh grade of school at a school in Makhnovichi in 1938 before moving to the Syrdarya region of the Uzbek SSR with her parents, who found employment on a cotton sovkhoz in Bayaut. There, she continued her studies in addition to working in the cotton fields in the summer and being a young pioneer leader. Despite dreaming of becoming a ship's captain at one point, she eventually decided to become a teacher, entering the history department of the Tashkent Pedagogical Institute in 1940.

== World War II ==
Shortly after starting another semester in September 1941, she left school for the army in November 1941. Initially she attended local radio operator courses, which she graduated from in January 1942 before being deployed to the warfront; the classes normally lasted over a year, but due to the war they were condensed to an intense several months of study. Nevertheless, she excelled as a radio operator, and was made a section leader in her class. Upon deployment on the Southern front she initially took part in the battle for Volchansk before reaching the city of Kharkov in May 1942. Throughout the war she participated in the battles for Volchansk, Kharkov, as well as the Voronezh-Voroshilovgrad operation. Having initially been assigned as a radio operator for a tank unit to help them communicate with infantry, she found herself wanting to get closer to the frontlines, and was eventually assigned to the 2nd battalion of the 216th Infantry Regiment. In addition to serving in her capacity as a radio operator, she practiced firing machine guns; in one of her letters home she wrote that she was happy for have found her place in the military. On 30 June the Wehrmacht launched an offensive that cut off the battalion command post she was stationed at from the rest of her regiment. Not giving up, she worked to transmit communications to regimental command as long as she could; after enemy soldiers broke into her post she shot several enemy soldiers in attempt to fight them off, but was eventually captured and tortured for information; despite being mutilated and both her hands being cut off, she refused to reveal the codes used. Unable to get her to reveal any information after brutal torture, the Nazis shot her. Her remains were later found by the Red Army, which buried her in a mass grave in the village of Zimovenka. On 27 September 1942 she was posthumously nominated for the Order of Lenin, but the award was downgraded to the Order of the Red Banner. Later on in the war a leaflet describing her feat was distributed in 1943, and eventually there were calls for her to be awarded the title of Hero of the Soviet Union. Shortly after the end of the war, she was nominated for the title, a decision supported by a general who heard about her death after seeing combat in the same battle as her, and eventually she was awarded the title on 15 May 1946. (Note: Sources differ on her exact date of death, with some indicating that she died on 26 June, but the offensive that she was killed in did not start until 30 June. Some literary accounts depict that killed in battle and not captured, but they are unsupported by facts)

== Awards ==
- Hero of the Soviet Union (15 May 1946)
- Order of Lenin (15 May 1946)
- Order of the Red Banner (5 November 1942)

== See also ==
- List of female Heroes of the Soviet Union
- Tatyana Baramzina
- Kseniya Konstantinova
