= Mariya Borovichenko =

Soviet soldier (1925–1943)

- Born: 21 October 1925; Mysholovka, Kiev, Ukrainian SSR, Soviet Union
- Died: 14 July 1943 (aged 17); Kursk Oblast, Russian SFSR, Soviet Union
- Military career
- Allegiance: Soviet Union
- Branch: Soviet airborne
- Service years: 1941–1943
- Rank: Senior sergeant
- Units: 3rd Airborne Corps; 87th Rifle Division; 13th Guards Rifle Division
- Conflicts: World War II; Battle of Kiev; Battle of Stalingrad; Battle of Kursk †
- Awards: Hero of the Soviet Union; Order of Lenin; Order of the Red Banner; Medal For Courage

Guards Sergeant Mariya Sergeyevna Borovichenko (October 21, 1925 – July 14, 1943) was a Soviet medical officer of the Soviet 32nd Guards Artillery Regiment, awarded the Medal for Combat Service, Medal For Courage, Order of the Red Star and the Order of the Red Banner. She was posthumously awarded the title Hero of the Soviet Union in May 1965 for saving a lieutenant.

== Biography ==
She was an orphan raised by her uncle near Mysholovka (translated as "Mousetrap") and she enrolled as a nurse when World War II started. While escaping from Kiev after the Germans attacked it, she collected valuable information and gave it to the 5th Airborne Brigade of the 3rd Airborne Corps, commanded by Alexander Rodimtsev, which allowed the Soviets to defeat some of the German troops; this earned her a position in the service. On August 13, 1941, she was wounded in a battle south of Kiev and, despite being wounded, she continued and saved her commander from German captivity. Later, she captured a high-ranking German officer and, with this deed, started attracting the attention of Rodimtsev, who closely followed her achievements. However, Borovichenko herself was captured near the village of Kazaktskoye but she soon escaped and notified her team. On September 5, 1941, after the Germans were surrounding Kiev, Rodimtsev moved his troops to the Seym River near Konotop, but the Germans followed and attempted to coax them across a damaged railroad bridge. However, Borovichenko saw this coming and convinced her comrades to help set up a Maxim gun and, as a spotter and loader, she cleared the way for the troops; Rodimtsev personally congratulated her. On September 17, she single-handedly captured ten German soldiers while scouting. She was prominently featured in newspapers as she carried on at the battlefront. At the Battle of Stalingrad, her fiancé was hit by a bullet.

Known to combatants as Mashenka from Myshelovka, Borovichenko was a companion of another medical attendant, Mikhail Kravchuk. Having noticed an enemy tank, Borovichenko threw a grenade and covered platoon lieutenant P. Korniyenko with her body. At this moment a shell exploded at her feet and she was killed by a shell splinter. Rodimtsev called her one of his favorite soldiers and she was buried near Mikhalskoyve. On May 6, 1965, she was honored as a Hero of the Soviet Union.

School N122, a school she attended in Kiev was named after her and a film was shot in 1965 (Нет неизвестных солдат) which was precisely produced and included newsreels. A street in Ivnya, Belgorod was also named for her.

== See also ==
- List of female Heroes of the Soviet Union
