= Shusterman =

Shusterman is a surname. Notable people with the surname include:

- Dalia Shusterman (born 1973), Canadian-American musician
- Melissa Shusterman (born 1967), American politician
- Naum Shusterman (1912–1976), Soviet military officer
- Neal Shusterman (born 1962), American writer
- Richard Shusterman (born 1949), American philosopher
