= Nina Petrova =

Soviet sniper (1893–1945)

- Нина Павловна Петрова
- Born: 27 July 1893; Lomonosov, Russian Empire
- Died: 1 May 1945 (aged 51); Gmina Gryfino, Nazi-occupied Poland
- Military career
- Allegiance: Soviet Union
- Branch: Red Army
- Service years: 1939–1945
- Rank: Starshina
- Unit: 284th Infantry Regiment
- Conflicts: World War II; Winter War; Eastern Front †
- Awards: Order of Glory, 1st Class

Nina Pavlovna Petrova (Russian: Нина Павловна Петрова; 27 July 1893 – 1 May 1945) was a Soviet sniper during the Winter War and World War II. She was credited with 122 kills by the Soviet government. She was posthumously awarded the Order of Glory 1st class on 29 June 1945, making her one of only four women to be awarded all three classes of the award.

== Civilian life ==
Petrova was born in 1893 to a Russian family in Lomonsov village within the Russian Empire. During Nina's youth her father died, leaving their mother alone to raise five children by herself, so after completing secondary school Nina enrolled in trade school. Three years later, the family moved to Vladivostok where Nina worked as an accountant during the day and went to school at night.

Later, Petrova moved to Revel and found employment at a shipyard. During the 1917 Revolution, she was a resident of Lodeynoye Pole in the St. Petersburg Oblast but moved to the city of Leningrad with her daughter in 1927. There she worked as a gym teacher and was active in various sports including horseback riding, cycling, rowing, swimming, basketball, skiing, hockey, and skating. From 1934 to 1935, Petrova was the team captain of the Leningrad Military District women's ice hockey team. After improving her sharpshooting skills, she entered a sniper school and became a certified sniper instructor.

== Military career ==
Petrova fought in the Soviet-Finnish War before volunteering for service in the German–Soviet War. Initially, Petrova served in the 4th Division of the Leningrad People's Militia before entering a medical battalion, even though she was too old to be drafted. In November 1941, she transferred to fight as a sniper in the 1st Infantry Battalion of the 284th Infantry Regiment of the 86th Tartu Rifle Division, where she rose through the ranks to sergeant-major (starshina).

In the Battle of Leningrad, Petrova trained other soldiers of the Red Army as snipers in addition to participating in direct combat.

On 16 January 1944, in the village of Zarudiny in the Leningrad Oblast, Petrova took out an enemy communications officer and another soldier. Her position was discovered and she managed to retreat to a different position and shot three more before it was attacked. From January to March 1944, she took out 23 enemy soldiers and was awarded the Order of Glory 3rd class on 2 March 1944 for her actions in Leningrad. For her actions in Leningrad, she was awarded the Medal For Battle Merit and the Medal For the Defence of Leningrad.

In early August 1944, while fighting on the 3rd Baltic Front, Petrova fought in a battle near the Lepassaare railway station in Estonia. During those combat engagements, she killed an additional twelve enemy soldiers for which she was awarded the Order of Glory 2nd class.

=== Battle for Elbing, death and legacy ===
While fighting on the 2nd Belorussian Front in the battle for the control of Elbing in February 1945, Petrova provided cover to her unit by attacking enemy positions with sniper fire, killing 32 enemy soldiers in that engagement and bringing her kill tally to 100 with her victories in Leningrad, Lepassaare, and other battles. For her actions in Elbing, Petrova was nominated to be awarded the Order of Glory 1st Class but did not live to receive it. She was killed in action on 1 May 1945, just days before the end of the war, when a mortar attack pushed her off a cliff. Throughout her career she trained 512 other snipers, killed 122 enemy soldiers, and took three enemy combatants captive.

== Awards and honors ==
- Order of Glory (3rd class - 2 March 1944, 2nd class - 20 August 1944, 1st class - 29 June 1945)
- Order of the Patriotic War 2nd class (2 April 1945)
- Medal "For Battle Merit" (11 April 1943)
- Medal "For the Defence of Leningrad"

== See also ==
- Matrena Necheporchukova
- Danute Staneliene
- Nadezhda Zhurkina
- Nina Lobkovskaya
- Roza Shanina
