= Kseniya Konstantinova =

Hero of the Soviet Union (1925–1943)

Kseniya Semyonovna Konstantinova
- Ксения Семёновна Константинова
- Born: 18 April 1925; Lubny, Lipetsk uyezd, Tambov Governorate, Russian SFSR, Soviet Union (present-day Suhaya Lubna, Lipetsk Oblast, Russian Federation)
- Died: 1 October 1943 (aged 18); Rudnyansky District, Smolensk Oblast, Russian SFSR, Soviet Union
- Military career
- Allegiance: Soviet Union
- Branch: Red Army
- Service years: 1943
- Rank: Senior Sergeant
- Unit: 730th Rifle Regiment
- Conflicts: World War II; Eastern Front †
- Awards: Hero of the Soviet Union

Kseniya Semyonovna Konstantinova (Russian: Ксения Семёновна Константинова; 18 April 1925 – 1 October 1943) was a combat medic in the Red Army during World War II who was posthumously awarded the title Hero of the Soviet Union on 4 June 1944.

== Civilian life ==
Konstantinova was born on 18 April 1925 to a Russian family in the village of Lubny. In 1937 she and her two younger brothers witnessed the NKVD arrest their father, Semyon Grigorievich, a primary school teacher, on charges under article 58 after a false accusation from colleagues. With their father sentenced to five years in prison as an enemy of the people, Kseniya and her siblings were considered children of an enemy of the people, a status that she long sought to rid herself of, knowing that her father was not guilty. Meanwhile, their mother Arina Semyonovna was left to raise her three children alone for the time being. After completing her seventh grade of school in 1940 Kseniya entered the Lipetsk Paramedic and Obstetric School, which she graduated from in 1942 before working at a hospital in Trubetchino village. Desperate to prove herself and wanting to help support the war effort as much as possible, she ran away from home in 1943 to join the army as a medic, leaving a note behind for her mother explaining that she felt compelled to go to the front.

== Military career ==
Not even 18 years old yet, after volunteering for the army in early 1943 she was originally sent to an infantry training brigade in the Volga Military District. Deployed to the warfront in May as a medic in the 730th Infantry Regiment of the 204th Infantry Division formed from her training brigade, she quickly put her medical training to use aiding wounded soldiers. In July during the intense fighting in the Kursk area that eventually made enemy forces retreat 30 kilometers she carried dozens of wounded soldiers away from the heat of battle, for which she was awarded her first military award, the Medal "For Battle Merit". During the battle for the Kursk Bulge she had to be briefly hospitalized after a concussion, but she soon returned to combat. Later on her division was withdrawn to the reserve on 25 July 1943 before being reorganized as part of the 43rd Army on the Kalinin Front. Soon it saw action during the offensive for the city of Demidov, where they were able to expel German forces from by 21 September only a week after the operation began. Later on, her battalion took heavy casualties in the battle for Shatilovo village on 1 October, also in Smolensk.

During the battle she evacuated her battalion commander Ivan Klevakin after he was badly wounded in combat; she then returned to the area of combat to assist more wounded soldiers. While in the middle of giving first aid, a formation of approximately 100 German soldiers infiltrated the Soviet position to encircle them before opening fire from machine guns, forcing Konstantinova to defend the cart of wounded soldiers by returning fire. She did her best to defend the wounded soldiers in her care, having killed twelve enemy soldiers before sustaining a head injury that left her unconscious. After being taken as a prisoner of war by the Nazis she refused to give any information about the nature of Soviet military operations in the area, for which she was brutally tortured and mutilated before eventually being stabbed and pinned to the ground with a stake. Her body was found the next day by her fellow soldiers who ensured she had full military honors when buried. On 9 October 1943 she was posthumously nominated for the title Hero of the Soviet Union, which was awarded the next year.

== Awards and recognition ==
=== Awards ===
- Hero of the Soviet Union (4 June 1944)
- Order of Lenin (4 June 1944)
- Medal "For Battle Merit" (27 July 1943)

=== Memorials and honors ===
- A song composed by Ernst Manvelyan titled "Sister of Mercy" is dedicated to Konstantinova and was later adapted into a musical play depicting her life and death in combat.
- Her portrait is present the Liptesk Hero's square and on a memorial plaque at the midwifery school where she studied; memorial plaques dedicated to her are also present at the Yelets and Smolensk medical schools.
- A town square in Liptesk and a street in her hometown bear her name.

== See also ==
- List of female Heroes of the Soviet Union
- Tatyana Baramzina
- Yelena Stempkovskaya
