= Aleksandra Shlyakhova =

Soviet female sniper (1923–1944)

- Александра Николаевна Шляхова
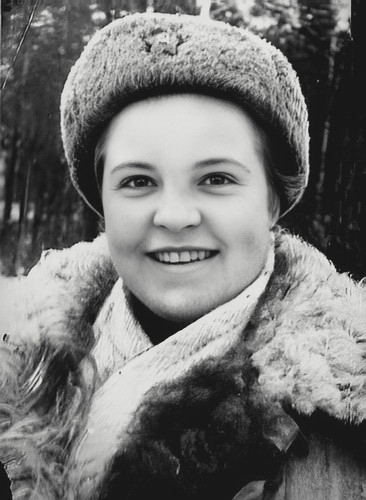
- Born: 1923; Zaporizhzhia Oblast, Ukrainian SSR
- Died: 7 October 1944 (aged 20–21); Dobele, Latvian SSR
- Military career
- Allegiance: Soviet Union
- Branch: Red Army
- Service years: 1942–1944
- Rank: Starshina
- Unit: 21st Guards Rifle Division
- Conflicts: World War II
- Awards: Order of the Red Banner

Alexandra Nikolaevna Shlyakhova (Russian: Александра Николаевна Шляхова; 1923 – 7 October 1944) was a Soviet female sniper in the Great Patriotic War.

== Biography ==
Aleksandra Shlyakhova was born in 1923 or 1924 in the city of Zaporozhye. Before the war, she worked at a factory. With the start of the war and the advance of the German forces, she was transferred to the Ural Mountains along with her mother, sister and brother.

She was called to the ranks of the Red Army by the military registration and registration department of Cheburkal region. In December 1942, she graduated with honor from the Central Women's Sniper Training School, and after graduation, on behalf of the Central Committee of the Komsomol, Aleksandra received a personal sniper rifle with a monogram on the butt. She was active in the army since August 1943. She fought as part of the 21st Guards Rifle Division.

She was injured by a mine on 1 December 1943, and returned to her unit after treatment in the hospital. By order of the division on 5 December 1943 she was awarded the Order of the Red Star. In January 1944, she was nominated for the medal "For Courage" for the destruction of 55 enemy soldiers and officers, and on January 31 of the same year, she was awarded a much higher award, the Order of the Red Banner. She reached the rank of starshina and was the commander of a sniper platoon.

She died on 7 October 1944, in the territory of the Latvian SSR. She was buried in Dobele city. She was posthumously awarded the Order of the Patriotic War 1st class. Her sniper rifle is kept in the Central Armed Forces Museum of Moscow.

== Awards ==
- Order of the Red Banner (31 January 1944)
- Order of the Patriotic War 1st class (20 October 1944)
- Order of the Red Star (5 December 1943)
