= Tatyana Baramzina =

Soviet female sniper (1919–1944)

Tatyana Nikolayevna Baramzina
- Татьяна Николаевна Барамзина
- Born: 19 December 1919; Glazov, Russian SFSR
- Died: 5 July 1944 (aged 24); Pekalin, Smalyavichy, Byelorussian SSR, Soviet Union
- Military career
- Allegiance: Soviet Union
- Branch: Red Army
- Service years: 1943–1944
- Rank: Corporal
- Unit: 252nd Rifle Regiment
- Conflicts: World War II †
- Awards: Hero of the Soviet Union

Tatyana Nikolayevna Baramzina (Russian: Татья́на Никола́евна Барамзина́; 19 December 1919 – 5 July 1944) was a Soviet sniper and telephone operator in World War II who was posthumously awarded the title of the Hero of the Soviet Union on 24 March 1945 for her self-sacrifice to defend wounded Red Army soldiers.

A volunteer, she chose to be part of a risky early landing operation to block German forces from using a strategic road in Belarus in the early phase of Operation Bagration. After her landing group suffered heavy casualties she had the option of hiding in a rye field to wait for reinforcements, but chose instead to stay behind and defend a dugout of wounded soldiers.

== Early life ==
Baramzina was born on 19 December 1919, the fifth of six children, to a family of Russian merchants; her father did a variety of odd jobs – fishing, building fences, weaving nets, repairing boats – while her mother baked rye bread to be sold at a market stall. Despite not making much money compared to the other breadsellers and having six children, her parents were disenfranchised in 1930 and much of their property confiscated. After the death of her father in 1931, her mother struggled to provide for the family, but Tatyana managed to graduate from secondary school in the mid 1930s.

At one point, Baramzina had dreamed of becoming a pilot, but that changed to becoming a teacher, so she worked as teacher in rural schools until getting a job at a school in Kachkashur on the outskirts of Glazov before graduating from the Glazov Pedagogical School as an external student in July 1939. Having finally been admitted to the Komsomol in 1937, she was assigned as a pioneer leader in addition to her regular teaching duties in August 1939, and during the school year she passed a basic first aid course along with other teachers.

In August 1940, Baramzina enrolled in the Molotov Pedagogical Institute, based in Perm, but left in February 1941 due to scholarship funding cuts and got a job as a kindergarten teacher.

== World War II ==
When Nazi Germany invaded the Soviet Union, Baramzina entered a six-month nursing course and attempted to enlist in the military. Initially refused entrance into the army, she went on to graduate with honors from a sharpshooting course, leading to her being accepted into the Central Women's Sniper Training School in June 1943. After graduating from the school in March 1944, she was deployed to the Western Front as a sniper in the 252nd Rifle Regiment. Having arrived on the warfront on 3 April 1944, she soon made her first kill within a week, and quickly accumulated her tally to 16 kills with a sniper rifle. However, with her eyesight deteriorating, she left sniper duties, but not wanting to be demobilized, she requested to be reassigned as a telephone operator at a command post in her regiment instead. In addition to being a telephone operator, she was also entrusted with repairing telephone lines; while doing so under heavy enemy fire in May 1944 she noticed enemy forces approaching her battalion's rear, and managed to warn her commander before he fell in battle before helping lead a counterattack. Later, during a forceful reconnaissance mission in late June, she repaired the command post's telephone line fourteen times despite facing intense artillery fire.

For Operation Bagration, the 70th Infantry Division formed a small assault force to block westward routes the Nazis could potentially use to retreat. With the Red Army convoy preparing their advance as planned in the evening of 4 July, Baramzina was not intended to be part of the landing group, but in the end she convinced her commander to let her go, citing her sniper and medical training. Having taken a crossing in Pekalin village, they awaited the intense battle with the disorganized incoming German column, which was not expecting them. Soon, Red Army artillery ambushed the column from both sides as it approached the outskirts of the village: with nowhere to retreat to, the Nazi troops fought nonstop, and eventually managed to hold the village for several hours.

Some of the Soviet soldiers who were too badly wounded in the battle to retreat into a grain field for concealment were placed in a dugout recently taken from the enemy. There, Baramzina chose to stay with them, placing herself in mortal danger of being attacked, despite having every opportunity to leave the dugout and crawl into the field of rye, where she would be safe, as the German soldiers were too busy trying to flee the Soviet encirclement to pursue the survivors hiding in the forest and grain field.

While tending to the wounded, German soldiers approached the dugout, and she defended it as long as she could despite being heavily outnumbered. When the first three German soldiers ran up to the dugout, she opened fire with a machine gun, killing them, followed by additional fire, taking out more approaching attackers, until she ran out of ammunition.

After running out of grenades to throw at her attackers, she was left defenseless as two German soldiers entered the dugout from behind and threw their grenades down, injuring her before entering. Enraged, they then proceeded to shoot the injured soldiers who appeared to be alive before dragging her out and brutally torturing her, stabbing and mutilating her with bayonets and beating her with the butts of their rifles before eventually shooting her in the head with an anti-tank rifle.

Only a few hours later, the area was retaken by reinforcements from the 70th Infantry Division, who found her remains; despite the severe casualties suffered by the first landing group, they had succeeded in their mission of blocking the German retreat to allow for full encirclement of the German forces in the area. On 18 July 1944, she was nominated for the title Hero of the Soviet Union for her self-sacrifice, which was awarded on 24 March 1945. Her remains were initially buried in a mass grave in Volma before the remains were transferred in 1963 to Kalita.

== Commemoration ==
In addition to a monument in the local Glazov park, Proletarskaya Street, on which she had grown up, was renamed in her honour, as well as streets in Minsk and Izhevsk and outside the Central Women's Sniper Training School. The Young Pioneers group at the school in which she had been teaching was also renamed in her memory. A diorama depicting her last stand was placed in the Belarusian Great Patriotic War Museum but it was relocated to the Military Academy of Belarus in 2014.

== See also ==
- List of female Heroes of the Soviet Union
- Kseniya Konstantinova
- Yelena Stempkovskaya
