= Nina Lobkovskaya =

Russian Red Army sniper (1924–2006)

Nina Alexeyevna Lobkovskaya
- Ни́на Алексе́евна Лобко́вская
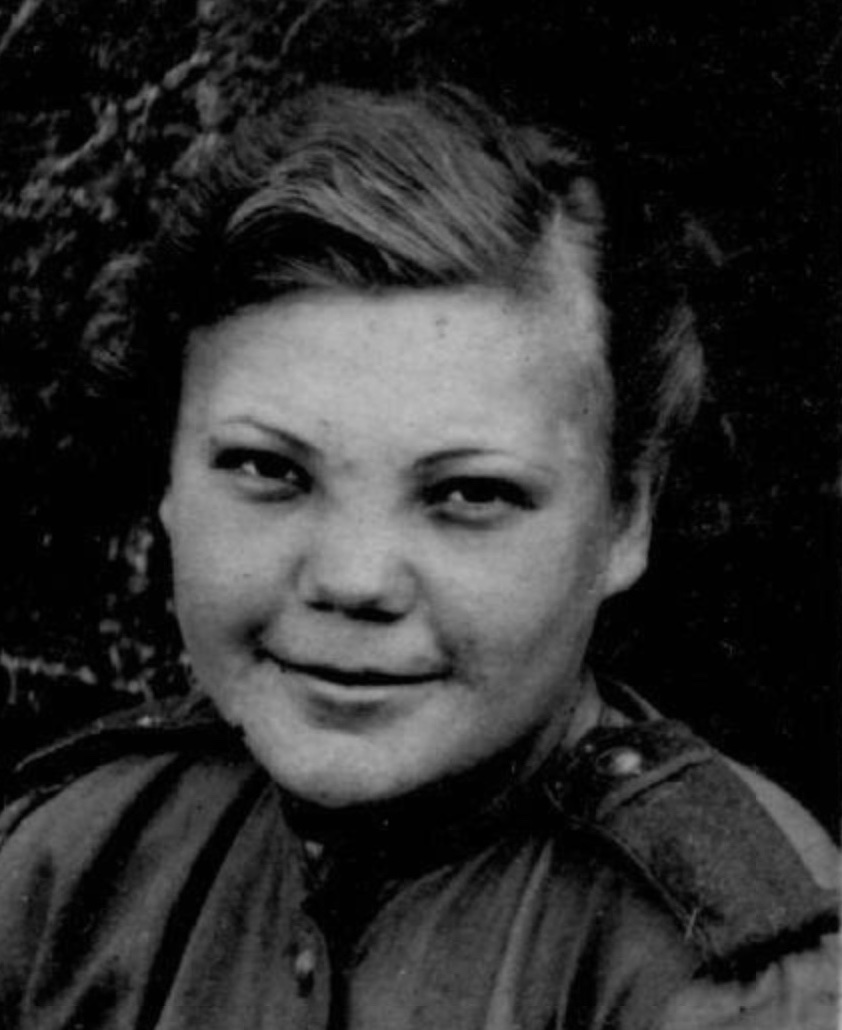
- Born: 8 March 1924; Fyodorovka, Karaganda Oblast, Kazakh ASSR, Soviet Union
- Died: 28 March 2006 (aged 82)
- Military career
- Allegiance: Soviet Union
- Branch: Red Army
- Service years: 1942–1945
- Rank: Lieutenant
- Unit: 3rd Shock Army
- Conflicts: World War II; Eastern Front; Battle of Nevel; Vistula–Oder Offensive; Battle of Berlin
- Awards: Order of the Red Banner

Nina Alexeyevna Lobkovskaya (Russian: Нина Алексеевна Лобковская; 8 March 1924 – 28 March 2006) was a Russian female sniper in the Red Army during World War II. She attained the rank of lieutenant and commanded a separate women's sniper company of the 3rd Shock Army during World War II. She was wounded twice and killed 89 people during the war.

== Early life ==
Lobkovskaya was born on 8 March 1924 (Note: Some sources say she was born in 1925) in Fyodorovka, Kazakh SSR, to a Russian family; she was the eldest of five children. Her mother was a schoolteacher, and her father was a mining engineer. Her family moved to the Tajik SSR in the 1930s because of her father's poor health, in hopes that the warmer climate would be good for him. She completed her tenth grade of school and attended OSOAVIAKhIM sharpshooting courses before volunteering to join the Red Army, but dreamed of going to college. While the war did not take place in the Tajik SSR, many people living there were sent to the warfront, and wounded soldiers were sent to the Tajik SSR to recover. Her father went to the front in 1942, where he was a machine-gunner before he died in combat. Initially she studied at the Stalinabad Medical Institute and tended to the wounded at a hospital. She entered the Red Army in December 1942. After hearing appeals from the Komsomol to young people calling on them to join the military, she and her friend Olga Maryenkina applied to the sniper school, which had separate women's courses that later became the Central Women's Sniper Training School. She graduated from the program in August 1943. The courses were very intense – they spent ten to twelve hours a day training in the cold, learning how to crawl through trenches, camouflage themselves, and shoot at moving targets.

== Combat path ==
Lobkovskaya went to the frontline in mid 1943 as part of a group of 50 women snipers assigned to the 21st Guards Rifle Division of the 3rd Shock Army on the Kalinin Front. (Note: Source differ as to if she went to the front in June or August 1943) Instead of being split up among different divisions, they formed a separate company, which was split into three groups, and then the snipers were put in pairs. Lobkovskaya was paired with Vera Artamonova, and on 10 August she killed her first enemy soldier. After staying with the 21st Division for a short time some of the women snipers were invited to a sniper rally, where famous snipers like Mikhail Budenkov and Stepan Petrenko were present. After the rally she and several other women snipers were tasked with training other snipers, while the rest of the women snipers from the group were sent to the 357th Rifle Division. After training the other snipers, they were also sent to the 357th Division, where Soviet defenses were holding the line at the large railway junction of Novosokolniki. Due to the conditions of the battlefield, it was difficult to go on a sniper hunt, and she often went weeks without a kill.

After the battle the company was moved to the 153rd Army Reserve Regiment and tasked with helping guard part of the Rastrubovo-Svyatoy-Kleshi line in the Nevel offensive. After the battle they were returned to the 21st Guards Rifle Division and issued flamethrowers to guard to prevent enemy forces from capturing them. They then helped defend a flamethrower unit against Nazi counterattacks and held their position in the face of enemy fire and air raids. Lobkovskaya said that it was the worst battle in her life. For their heroic defense of Nevel the division was awarded the name "Nevelskaya."

After another sniper tally Lobkovskaya was appointed commander of a platoon, which received reinforcements before joining the 1253rd Regiment of the 379th Infantry Division. Later she engaged in a sniper duel with a German officer who was training his subordinates to attack Soviet snipers, but despite being wounded by a bullet she won the duel.

After the Nevel offensive operation, the Kalinin Front was renamed the 1st Baltic Front, and 3rd Shock Army was moved to the 2nd Baltic Front. In October 1944, the sniper company was again sent to the 21st Guards Division which was fighting Latvian town of Dobele. During one of the battles her partner Antonina Boykova was killed by machine gun fire and Lobkovskaya herself was wounded.

In December 1944 after Riga was liberated by the Red Army, the 3rd Shock Army was moved to the 1st Belorussian Front and then took part in the Vistula-Oder offensive, liberating Poland. The women snipers took part in the liberation of Warsaw and continued to advance West, marching 400 kilometers in two weeks.

In February 1945 she was appointed commander of a separate company of women snipers of the 3rd Shock Army. The company fought in the battles in the Dramburg area, where a large Nazi formation tried to break out of encirclement but the women's sniper company was brought in along with other units to prevent them from leaving the encirclement. Later they were tasked with holding a section of road. On 3 March her company was attached to a searchlight unit that was composed of women operators, where they learned how to operate the searchlights and helped the women position the searchlights during a battle when they were under heavy artillery fire. After the 3rd Shock Army broke through the Oder–Neisse line, her company was taken away from the front to guard army headquarters.

== Civilian life ==
In June 1945 she was invited to Moscow for a Komsomol meeting of frontline soldiers. She then signed up for the history faculty of Moscow State University, but because she was not demobilized yet, she had to return to Germany and wait to be demobilized in October before she could begin her studies in Moscow. She left the army with the rank of lieutenant. After graduating she worked as a lecturer that the Central Museum of V. I. Lenin, and in 1974 she was awarded the title Honored Culture Worker of the RSFSR. After retiring she became a personal pensioner.

Lobkovskaya died on 28 March 2006, at the age of 82.

== Awards and honors ==
- Order of the Red Banner
- Two Orders of the Patriotic War 1st class
- Order of the Patriotic War 2nd class
- Order of Glory 3rd class
- Medal "For Courage"
- Medal "For Battle Merit"
- campaign and jubilee medals
