= Yevdokiya Zavaly =

Soviet Ukrainian female marine commander (1924–2010)

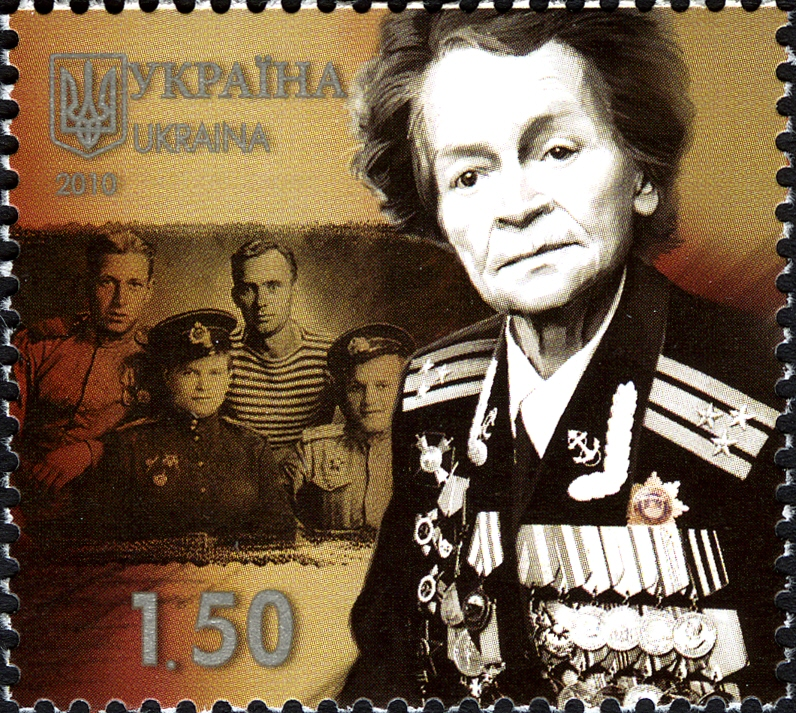
- Born: 28 May 1924; Novy Bug, Odesa Governorate, Ukrainian SSR, Soviet Union
- Died: 5 May 2010 (aged 85) Kyiv, Ukraine
- Allegiance: Soviet Union
- Service years: 1941–1947
- Rank: Colonel
- Conflicts: World War II
- Awards: Order of the Red Banner

Yevdokiya Nikolaevna Zavaly (Russian: Евдокия Николаевна Завалий, Ukrainian: Євдокія Миколаївна Завалій; 28 May 1924 – 5 May 2010) was the only Soviet female commander of a platoon of marines during the Second World War.

== Early life ==
Zavaly was born on 28 May 1924 in the town of Novy Buh of the Mykolaiv district of the Odesa province.

== World War II ==
In 1941, shortly after she turned 17, the invasion of the Soviet Union began. On July 25, 1941, fighting broke out in her hometown, Novy Buh. She bandaged wounded soldiers and commanders under bombardment. When the 96th Cavalry Regiment of the 5th Cavalry Division of the 2nd Cavalry Corps began to drop back, she persuaded the regiment commander to take her with him, saying she was soon 18 years old.

On 13 August 1941, German troops approached Novy Buh. Their offensive was restrained by units of the 169th Rifle Division of the 18th Army. At night, the Soviet units left the Novy Bug by order of the command, and on 14 August 1941, the Nazis occupied her native village.

In the regiment, she served as a nurse. While crossing the Dnipro river near Khortytsia, she was wounded and sent to a hospital in Krasnodar. The doctors wanted to commission her, but she refused. After treatment, Zavaliy was sent to the reserve regiment, but when the soldiers were selected for the front line, she was mistaken for a man, especially since she was in a tunic and breeches, and in her documents was written "Zavaly Yevdok. Nik” which made it difficult to identify the sex correctly.

Zavaliy was sent to the 6th Airborne Brigade. She managed to keep her gender secret for 8 months. After she captured a German officer, she was sent to the intelligence department, of which she soon became commander. In one of the battles, the platoon commander was killed and she persuaded everyone to attack. She was wounded in this battle and her secret was revealed in the hospital when it became apparent that "Yevdokim", who had been fighting with the paratroopers for 8 months, was actually a woman.

In 1943, she was sent to a six-month course for junior commanders, and after graduating, as a junior lieutenant, she was sent to the 83rd Marine Brigade as a platoon commander.

Commanding a platoon, she participated in the Siege of Sevastopol, stormed Mount Sapun (for which she was awarded the Order of the Patriotic War 1st class), participated in the battles for Balaklava, Tsukrova Holivka, and Kerch, crossed the Dniester, participated in the re-occupation of Bessarabia and fought in the battles of Taman, Tuapse, and Novorossiysk. She participated in landings in Constanța in Romania, Varna and Burgas in Bulgaria, and Yugoslavia.

During the Budapest offensive, Zavaliy and her platoon seized the bunker of the German command through the city sewer with oxygen tanks. Among the prisoners was a general, for whom this captivity was a disgrace because the commander of the paratroopers was a woman. For this episode, she was awarded the Order of the Red Banner.

With her platoon, Zavaliy blocked the retreat of German tanks. Paratroopers under her command faced up to 7 tanks.

== Postwar years ==
After the war, Zavaliy was to be sent to study at a military school, but she had received 4 wounds and 2 contusions during the war. In 1947 she was demobilized and went to Kyiv.

In Kyiv, she met her future husband and got married. She had two children, four grandchildren, and four great-grandchildren. As a civilian, she worked as director of a grocery store.

She toured many cities, military units, ships, and submarines with stories about her platoon of Marines. In May 2009 she took part in the celebrations on the occasion of Victory Day and the 65th anniversary of the liberation of Sevastopol, and in autumn she visited Azerbaijan with a delegation of Ukrainian veterans. In total, in 2009 she held more than 130 meetings with various audiences in Ukraine, Russia, Azerbaijan, and Moldova.

Zavaly died on 5 May 2010 in Kyiv. She was buried with military honors in Baikove Cemetery.

== Awards ==
=== Soviet Union ===
- Order of the October Revolution
- Order of the Red Banner
- Order of the Red Star
- Order of the Patriotic War 1st and 2nd class
- Medal "For the Defense of the Caucasus"
- Medal "For the Defense of Sevastopol"
- Medal "For the Capture of Budapest"
- Medal "For the capture of Vienna"
- Medal "For the Liberation of Belgrade"

=== Ukraine ===
- Order of Bohdan Khmelnytsky III class
- Order of the Golden Fortune III class

=== Honorary titles ===
Zavaly is an honorary citizen of eight cities, including Bilhorod-Dnistrovsky (Ukraine), Burgas (Bulgaria), Novy Buh (Ukraine), and Varna (Bulgaria).

== See also ==
- Yekaterina Mikhailova-Demina
