= Podvig naroda =

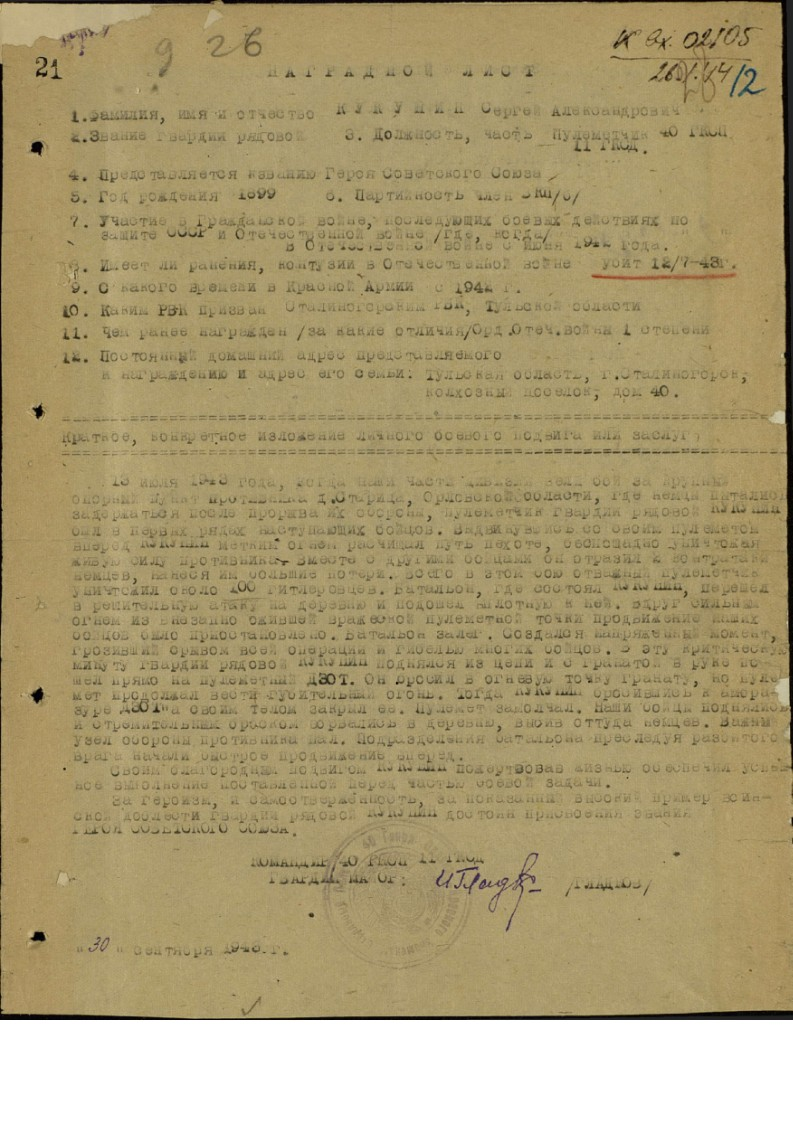
Example of an electronic copy of the award sheet from the site Podvig naroda

Database "Movement of the people in the Great Patriotic War 1941-1945" (Russian: Подвиг народа в Великой Отечественной войне 1941—1945 гг.) is an electronic database of documents related to the period of the Great Patriotic War. The content of the bank is formed by the documents of the Central Archives of the Russian Ministry of Defence (TsAMO), specifically award files and documents on operational control of hostilities.

As of August 30, 2020, the bank contains information about 40 391 096 awards.

The initiator of the project is the Department for Development of Information and Telecommunication Technologies of the Ministry of Defense of the Russian Federation, and telecommunications support is provided by OAO Rostelecom. The creation and technical implementation of the project is carried out by the ELAR corporation.

To digitize TsAMO documents, about 19 million sheets in total, special planetary scanners were developed. Due to the fact that the documents are 70 years old, machine recognition of the text did not cope with the task, making about 50% of errors. To solve this problem, 5,000 home operators were involved, and in order to minimize their errors, each document was recognized by two operators, and if their result matched after a machine check, the data was entered into the database.
