= Naum Shusterman =

Soviet union lieutenant colonel

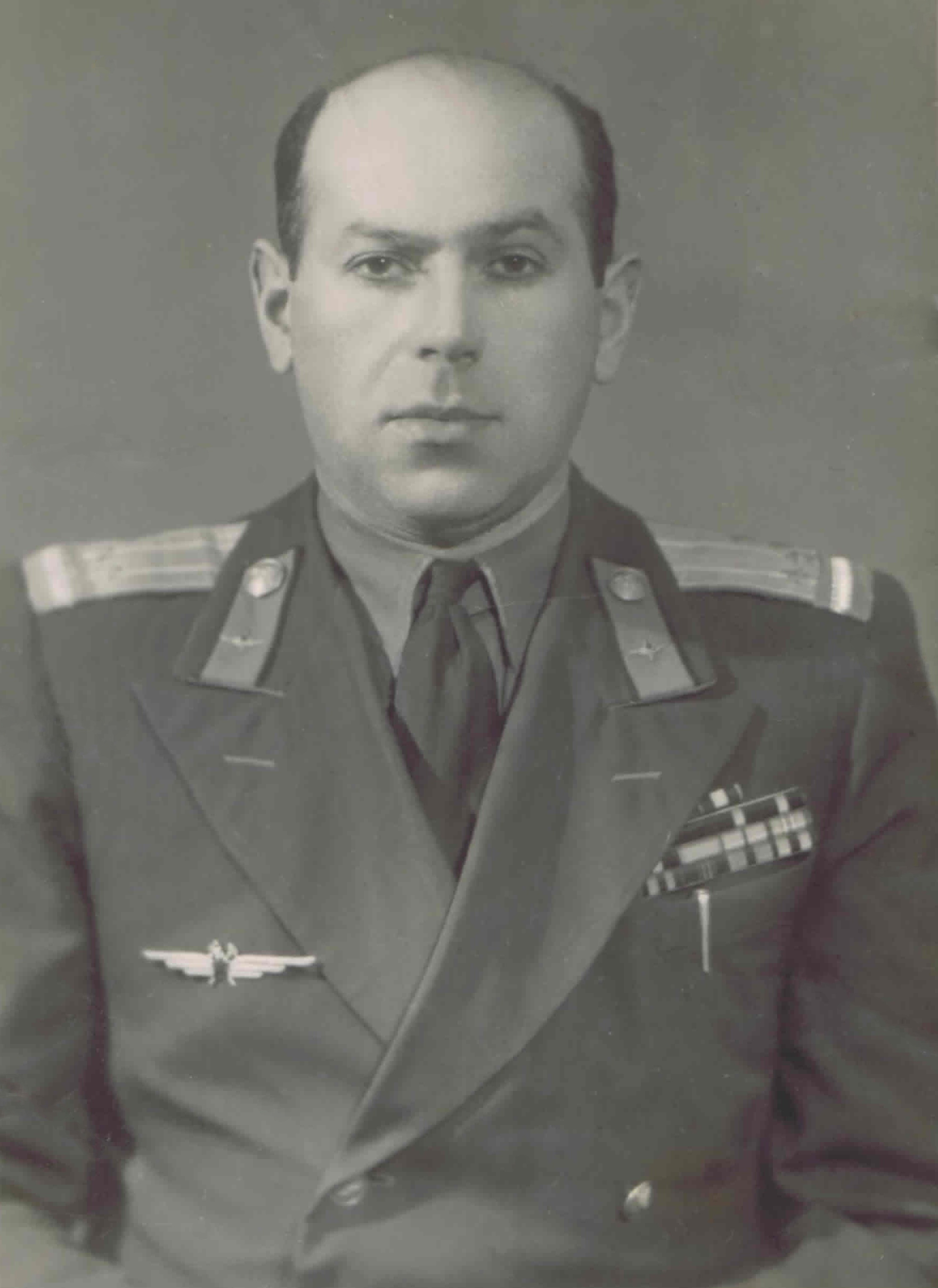
- Lieutenant Colonel Naum Shusterman

Personal details
- Born: Naum Semyonovich Shusterman; Наум Семенович Шустерман; 18 August 1912 Kiev, Russian Empire
- Died: 25 April 1976 (aged 63) Kiev, Ukrainian SSR, Soviet Union
- Profession: Army Officer

Military service
- Allegiance: Soviet Union
- Branch/service: Soviet Army; Soviet Engineer Troops
- Years of service: 1932–1954
- Rank: Lieutenant colonel
- Commands: 43rd Soviet Fighter Aviation Regiment
- Battles/wars: World War II; Winter War; Eastern Front

Naum Semyonovich Shusterman (18 August 1912 – 25 April 1976) was a lieutenant colonel of the Soviet Union, who served as the chief engineer of the 43rd Soviet Fighter Aviation Regiment during the Great Patriotic War.

== Biography ==
=== Early life ===
Shusterman was born on 18 August 1912, in Kiev, then Russian Empire, to parents Shendlya and Simeon Shusterman. He had four sisters.

=== Military service ===
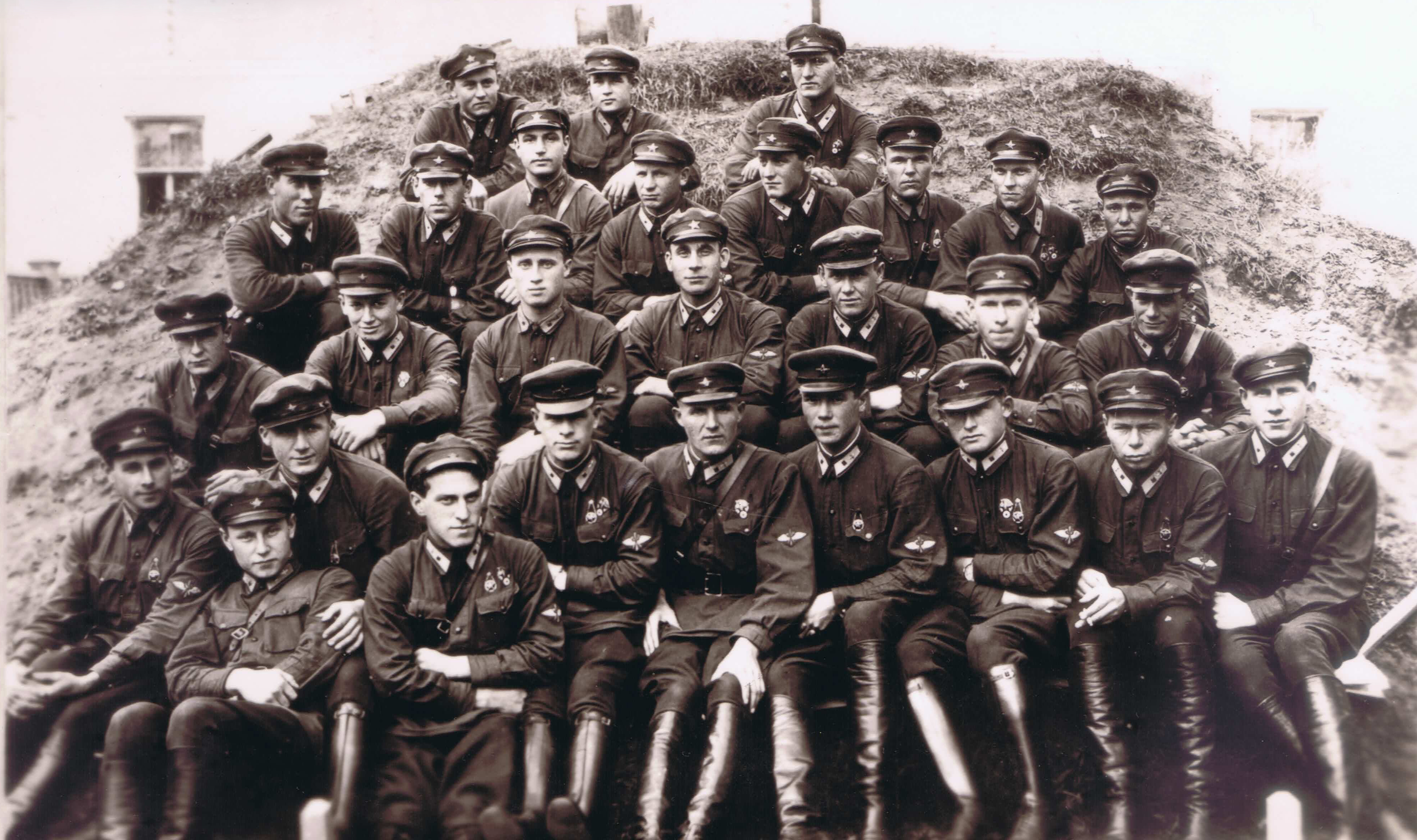
The aviation engineers of the Military Aviation Engineering Academy of Leningrad. Shusterman is in the second row from the top, second from the left.

At the age of 18, Shusterman attended the Military Aviation Engineering Academy of Leningrad. He remained there for three years, and learned numerous technicalities of military aircraft. In 1932, Shusterman enlisted in the 16th Aviation Army of the USSR, where he served as an engineer of the 3rd rank.

=== Great Patriotic War ===
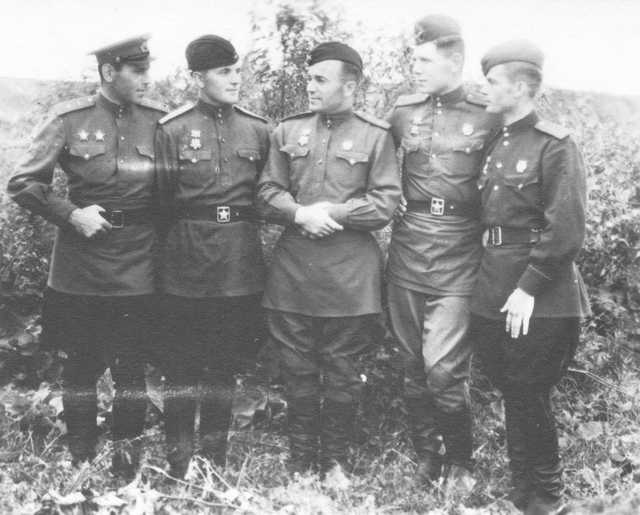
43rd Fighter Aviation Regiment command, 1943. From left to right: Chief Engineer Maj. Naum S. Shusterman, Squadron Commander Maj. Semyon A. Lebedev, Regiment Commander Maj. Alexander A. Doroshenkov, Senior Pilot Alexander V. Kochetov, Commander of the 1st Squadron Lt. Spartak I. Makovskiy.

During the Winter War and the Great Patriotic War, Shusterman served as a captain and later as a major, holding the position of Chief Engineer of the 43rd Soviet Fighter Aviation Regiment. Serving all over the Eastern Front, he participated in the defense of Kiev, Stalingrad and Leningrad, in the liberation of Warsaw and in the capture of Berlin. Shusterman became one of the few people who fought in the war from beginning to end.

=== Later service and discharge ===
In 1949, Shusterman was promoted to the rank of lieutenant colonel. He continued to serve as Chief Engineer until his discharge. Shusterman, aged 42, was honorably discharged from the Soviet Army in 1954 on account of illness. His discharge conditions gave him rights to wear his military uniform.

=== Death ===
Even though Shusterman attended the 30th Anniversary of Victory celebrations in Moscow in 1975, his health slowly began to deteriorate. He was admitted to the Kiev Military Hospital in February 1976, where he spent the final three months of his life. On 25 April 1976, Shusterman died of lung cancer. He was aged 63.

=== Personal life ===
Shusterman married Elizabeth Chernyak in 1934, and in 1936, they had their first son, Alexander. In 1937, Chernyak gave birth to twins, Arnold and Mikhail.

== Awards and decorations ==
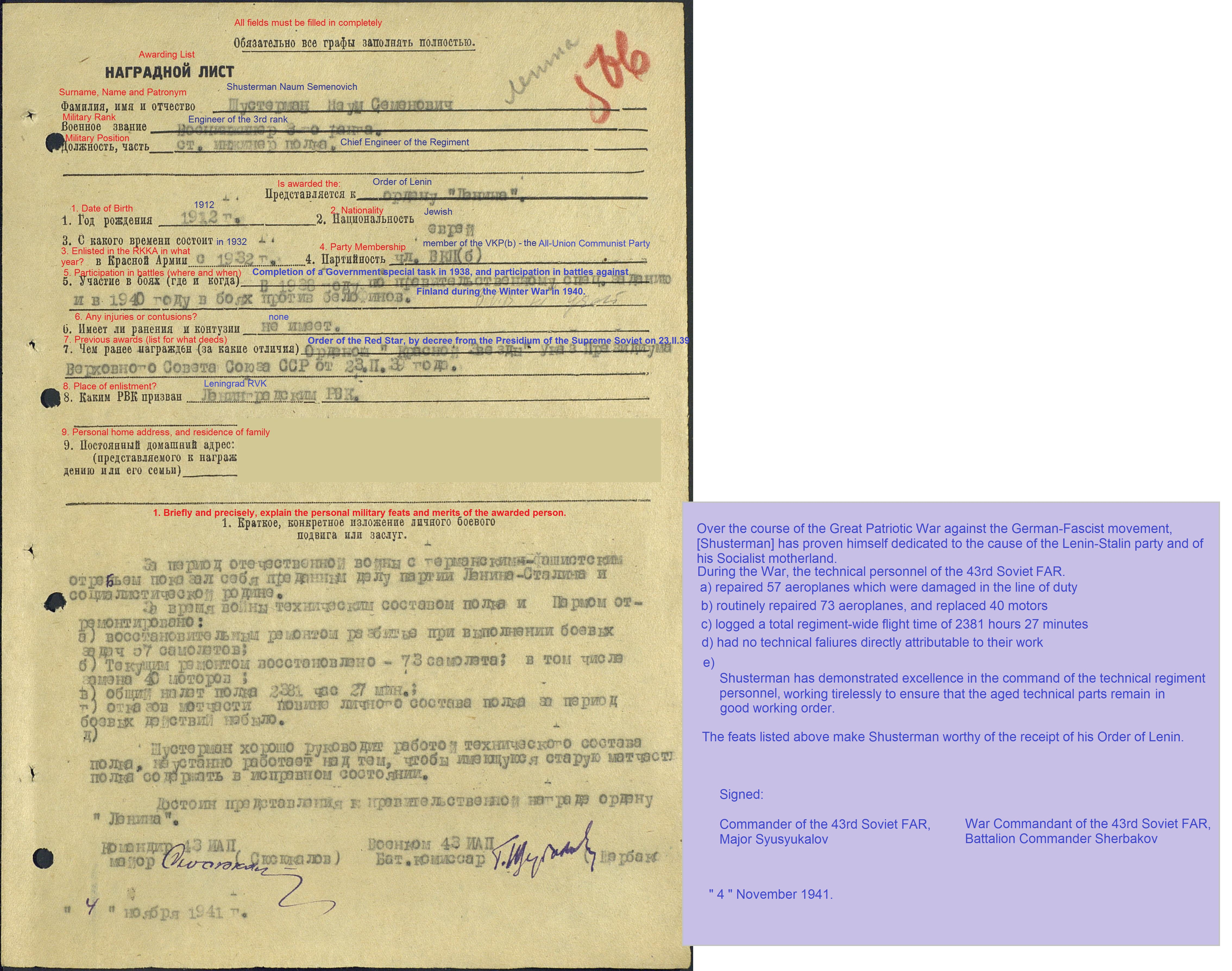
The awarding document for Shusterman's Order of Lenin, translated into English. Fields filled in are in blue, questions are in red.

Shusterman has demonstrated excellence in the command of the technical regiment personnel, working tirelessly to ensure that the aged technical parts remain in good working order.

— Shusterman's award document for his Order of Lenin

Shusterman received seven Orders, seven campaign medals, three service medals and six jubilee medals during his military career and personal life. In 1939, he received his first Order of the Red Star. He received an Order of Lenin in 1941, and another Order of the Red Star in 1942-1943. He was also awarded the Order of the Patriotic War twice (one of each class), and received an Order of the Red Banner towards the end of the war. Shusterman received medals for his participation in the defence of Stalingrad, Kiev and the Caucasus, in the liberation of Warsaw and in the Capture of Berlin. He was also awarded the Medal for Battle Merit and the Medal for Victory.

=== List ===
- Order of Lenin
- Order of the Red Banner
- Order of the Red Star (three times)
- Order of the Patriotic War, 1st class
- Order of the Patriotic War, 2nd class
- Medal for Battle Merit
- Medal "For the Defence of Stalingrad"
- Medal "For the Defence of the Caucasus"
- Medal "For the Defence of Kiev"
- Medal "For the Capture of Berlin"
- Medal "For the Liberation of Warsaw"
- Medal "For the Victory over Germany in the Great Patriotic War 1941–1945"
- Medal "For Impeccable Service", 1st class
- Medal "For Impeccable Service", 2nd class
- Medal "For Impeccable Service", 3rd class
- Jubilee Medal "30 Years of the Soviet Army and Navy"
- Jubilee Medal "40 Years of the Armed Forces of the USSR"
- Jubilee Medal "50 Years of the Armed Forces of the USSR"
- Jubilee Medal "Twenty Years of Victory in the Great Patriotic War 1941-1945"
- Jubilee Medal "Thirty Years of Victory in the Great Patriotic War 1941-1945"
- Jubilee medal "For Military Valour in Commemoration of the 100th Anniversary since the Birth of Vladimir Il'ich Lenin"
