= Irina Dryagina =

Soviet military officer and botanist (1921–2017)

- Native name: Ирина Викторовна Дрягина
- Born: 31 March 1921; Saratov, Russian SFSR
- Died: 9 June 2017 (aged 96) Moscow, Russia
- Allegiance: Soviet Union
- Branch: Soviet Air Force
- Service years: 1941–1945
- Rank: Captain
- Awards: Order of the Red Banner

Irina Viktorovna Dryagina (Russian: Ирина Викторовна Дрягина; 31 March 1921 – 9 June 2017) was a botanist and veteran of the Second World War. During the conflict, she served as a squadron commissar in the 46th Guards Night Bomber Aviation Regiment until the post of squadron commissar was abolished, after which she transferred to the post of assistant chief of the political department for the Komsomol of the 9th Guards Fighter Aviation Division, commanded by Alexander Pokryshkin.

== Biography ==
Dryagina was born in Saratov on 31 March 1921. Her father was a Volga sailor, then a captain of his own vessel. During her childhood, Dryagina and her family regularly sailed on a barge from Saratov to Astrakhan; her brother Viktor died when he was just 37 years old. She learned to fly at the Saratov aeroclub before entering the military in 1941. Having been a member of the Communist Party since 1940, she was initially made a squadron commissar. In May 1942 she was deployed to the Southern Front with the women's 588th Night Bomber Aviation Regiment (later renamed as the 46th Guards Night Bomber Aviation Aviation Regiment), and she participated in her first combat sortie later that month. While part of the night bomber regiment she participated in the battles for the Caucasus, Kuban, and Crimea, totaling 105 sorties on the Po-2. After the position of squadron commissar was officially abolished in 1943 she transferred to the 9th Guards Fighter Aviation Division as an assistant chief of the political department for the Komsomol.

== Postwar ==
After the war, Dryagina studied at the Timiryazev Agricultural Academy. In the 1960s, she started working with the Moscow State University in the All-Union Research Institute of Selection and Seed Production of Vegetable Crops. From 1963, she was assistant professor of the Department of Genetics, Biological and Soil. She completed her doctorate on 5 January 1972. From 1978 to 1984, she headed the Laboratory for Selection and Seed Production of Flower Cultures. Dryagina worked on varieties of iris, flowers and ornamental crops and named her varieties after pilots she had served with. In 2007 her memoirs were published, titled "Записки летчицы У-2" (English: Notes of the U-2 pilot). She died in Moscow in 2017.

== Awards ==
- Order of the Red Banner
- Two Order of the Patriotic War 1st class
- campaign and jubilee medals
