= Central Women's Sniper Training School =

Soviet military school

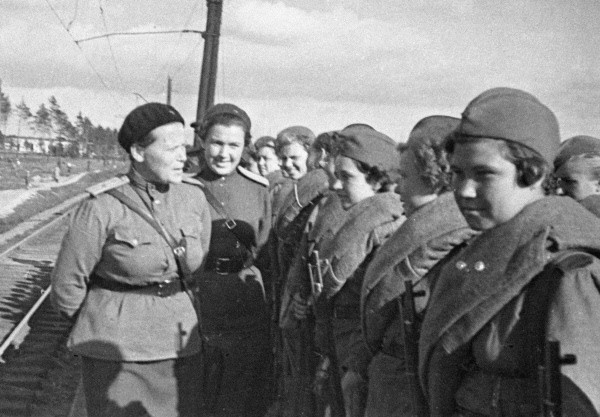
- Major Yekaterina Nikiforova speaking to students about to be deployed, 1 April 1943
- Established: 1942
- Mission: Training female snipers to fight in World War II
- Head: Colonel Nikolai Kolchak
- Location: Soviet Union
- Dissolved: 1945

The Central Women's Sniper Training School (Russian: Центральная женская школа снайперской подготовки) was a Soviet military school for training female snipers for battle in the Second World War, more commonly referred to as the Great Patriotic War among Soviet Troops. Throughout the war the school trained 1061 snipers and 407 sniper instructors. The school yielded several highly successful snipers who became decorated veterans, and two graduates were posthumously awarded the title Hero of the Soviet Union.

== History ==
The school was established in Veshnyaki, Moscow Oblast after an order issued on 20 March 1942 by the People's Commissariat of Defence to establish the school. Potential students had to be at least 20 years old, physically fit, graduated at least seven of their secondary school classes, and pass the initial 4-day Vsevobuch program. After a parade and swearing upon an oath the school was officially opened on 3 May.

In February 1943 students of the school donated 69,260 roubles of their combined savings to kickstart further rifle manufacturing. That same month a practice shooting range was opened in Kosino. In May the school officially became the Central Women's Sniper Training School. On 25 June the school was ordered to form two battalions and a unit of sniper instructors after 50 graduates were sent to the Kalinin Front and another 54 sent to the Northwestern Front among the first batch of cadets. In July a second set of cadets swore their military oath and began their training. Cadets who passed the Moscow Higher Military Command School exam in addition to graduating achieved the rank of junior lieutenant. Of the March 1944 graduating class, 150 were sent to the Northwestern Front, 75 to the 2nd Baltic Front, 200 to the Western Front, 75 to the 1st Baltic Front, and 85 to the 1st Belorussian Front.

In May 1944 the third batch of cadets took their oath and began training. On 25 November 1944, 559 of the women left the academy for active duty before the rest of the remaining 411 students of their graduating class were deployed to the warfront in February. Those students included 95 sent to the 1st Belorussian Front, 87 sent to the 2nd Belorussian Front, 110 sent to the 1st Ukrainian Front, and 119 were sent to the 4th Ukrainian Front.

The school was disbanded from 15 March to 10 May 1945 while personnel were transferred to the Moscow Higher Military Command School.

== Notable graduates ==
- Hero of the Soviet Union Aliya Moldagulova † – ~30 kills
- Hero of the Soviet Union Tatyana Baramzina † – 36 kills
- Olga Bordashevskaya – ~108 kills
- Nina Lobkovskaya – 89 kills
- Aleksandra Vinogradova – 82 kills
- Aleksandra Shlyakhova † – 69 kills
- Roza Shanina † – 59 kills
