= Order of the Red Star =

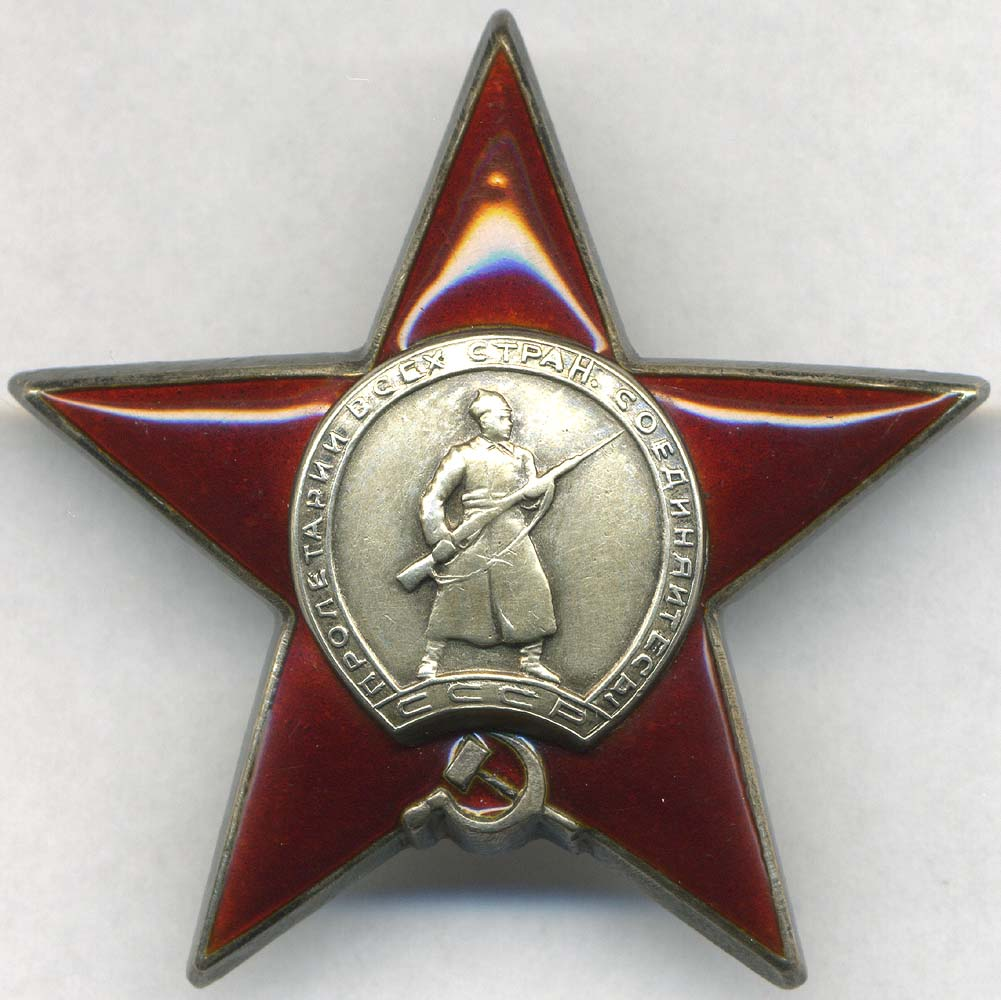
- The Order of the Red Star (obverse)
- Type: Single-grade order
- Awarded for: Great contribution to the defence of the USSR in war and in peacetime and for ensuring public safety
- Presented by: Soviet Union
- Eligibility: Soviet military personnel
- Status: No longer awarded
- Established: 6 April 1930
- First award: September 1930
- Final award: 19 December 1991

Highlights
- Total: 3,876,740
- Ribbon of the Order of the Red Star

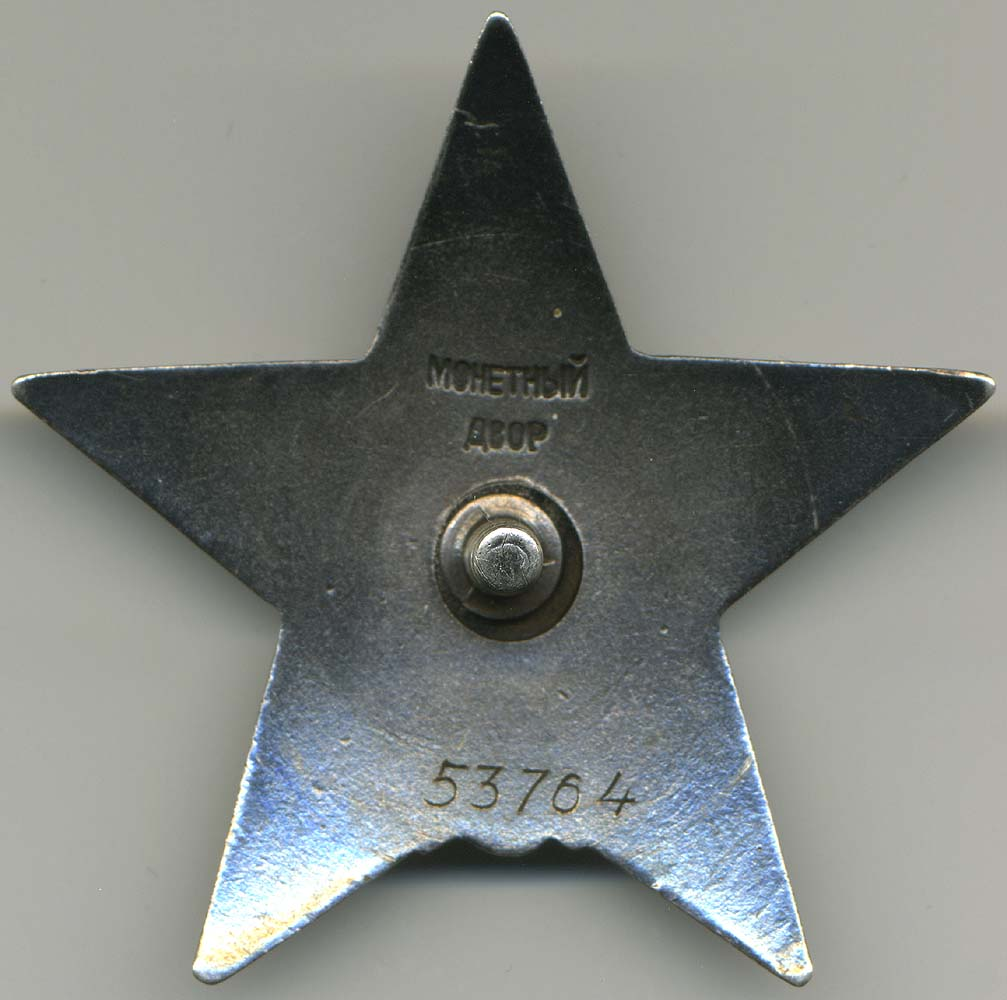
Reverse of the Order of the Red Star

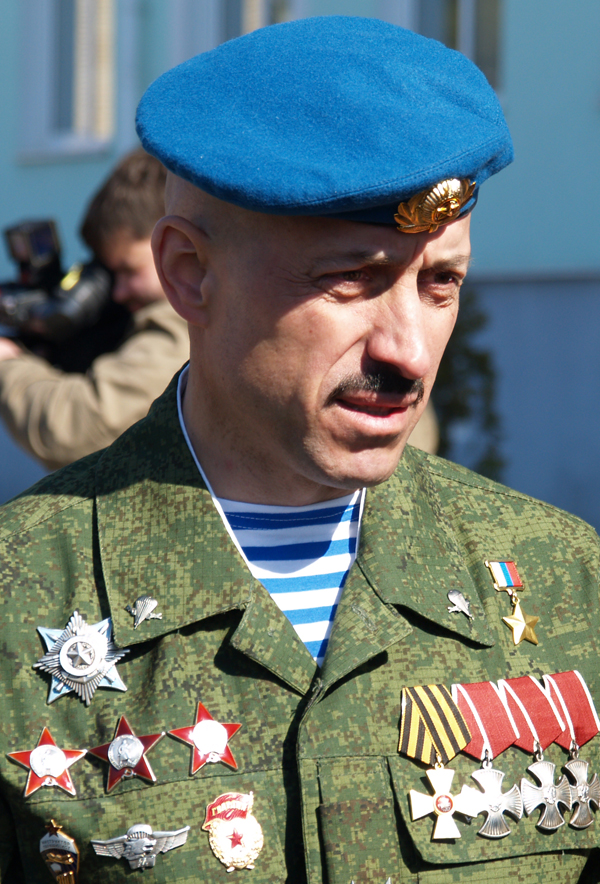
Lieutenant Colonel Anatoly Lebed wearing his three Orders of the Red Star earned in Afghanistan (Photo from Russian Def Min)

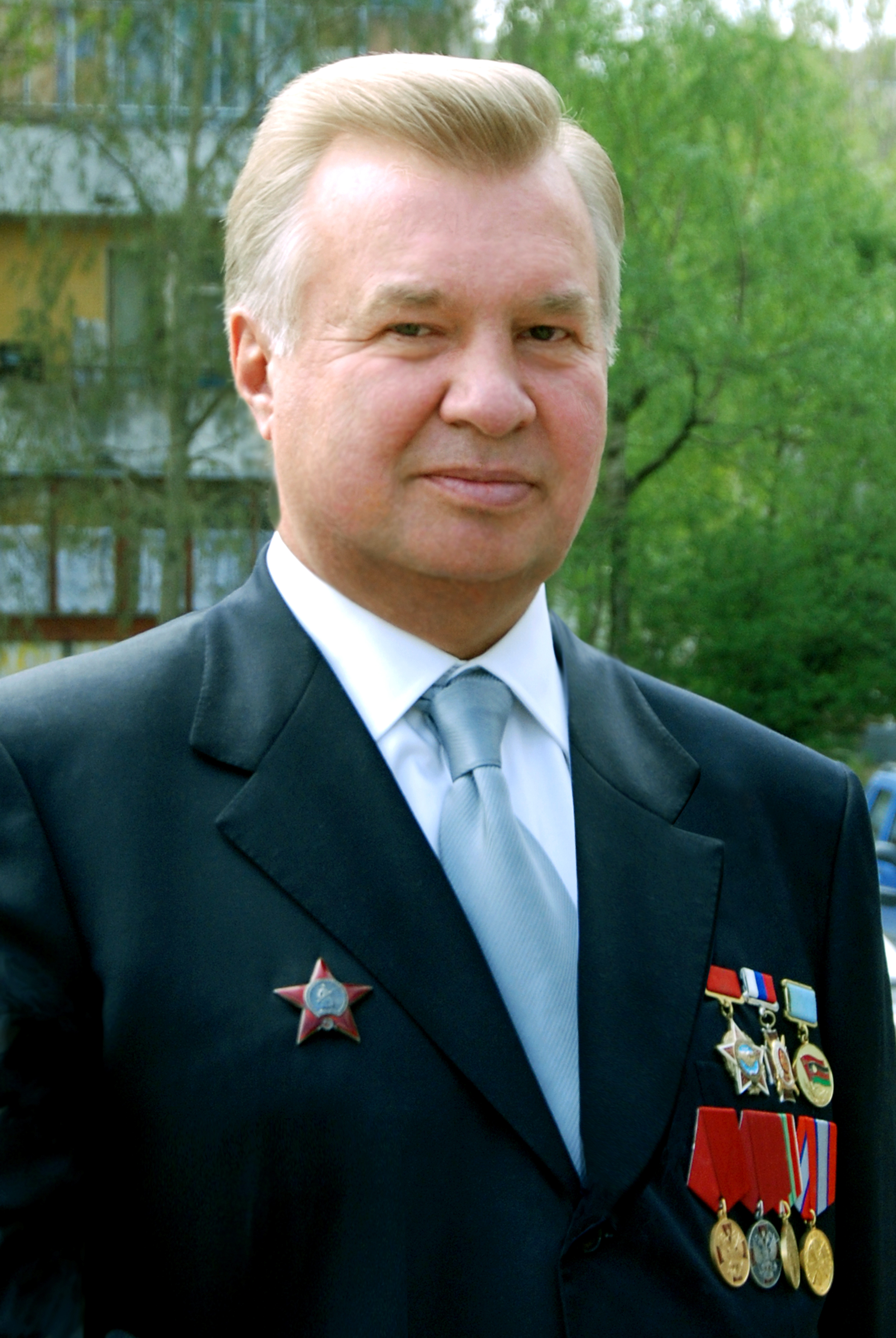
Afghanistan veteran Igor Vladimirovich Vysotsky wearing his Order of the Red Star and other awards on civilian attire

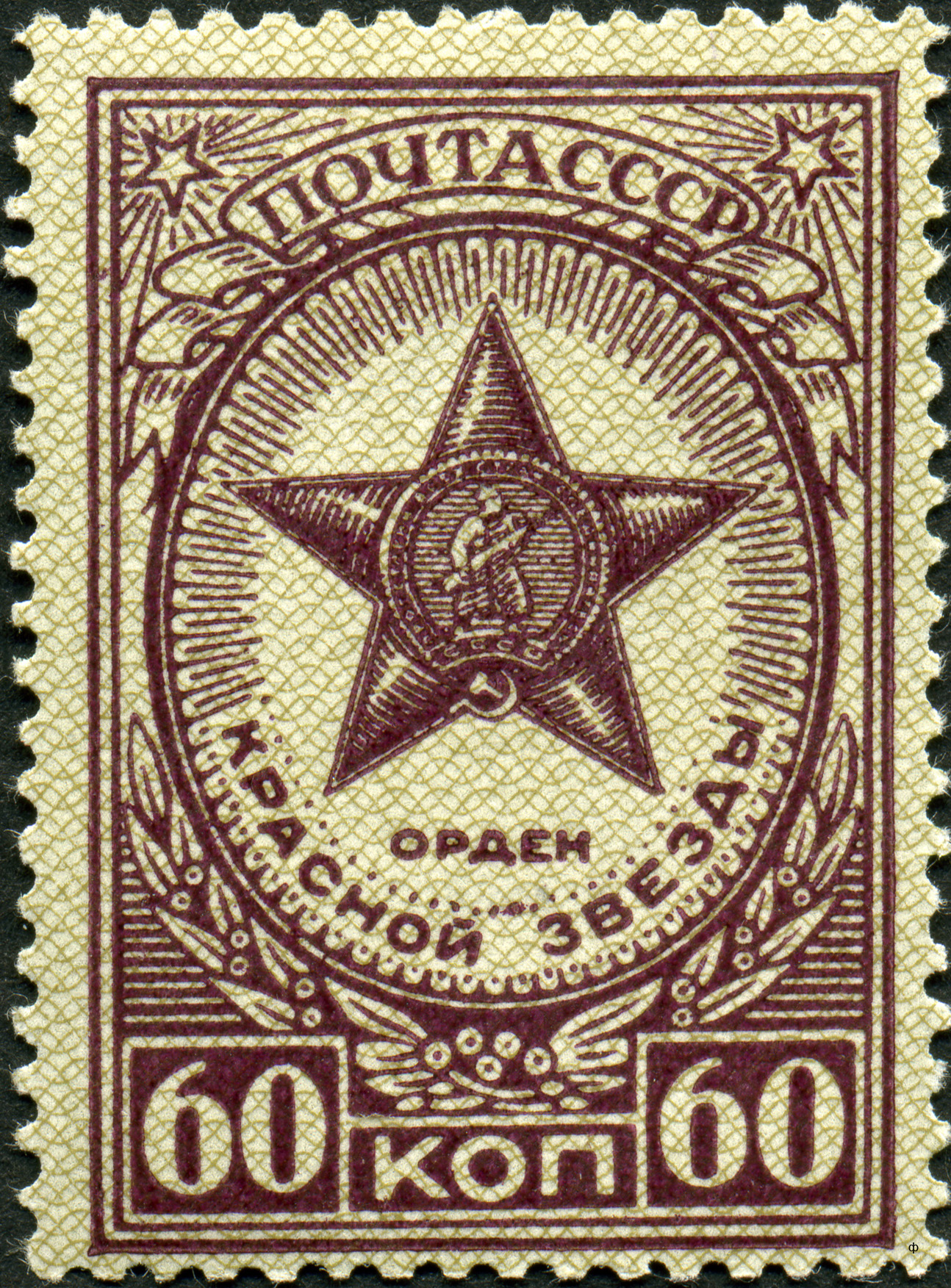
1946 Soviet 60 kopek stamp bearing the Order of the Red Star

The Order of the Red Star (Russian: Орден Красной Звезды, romanised: Orden Krasnoy Zvezdy) was a military decoration of the Soviet Union. It was established by decree of the Presidium of the Supreme Soviet of the USSR of 6 April 1930 but its statute was only defined in decree of the Presidium of the Supreme Soviet of the USSR of 5 May 1930. That statute was amended by decrees of the Presidium of the Supreme Soviet of the USSR of 7 May 1936, of 19 June 1943, of 26 February 1946, of 15 October 1947, of 16 December 1947 and by decree No 1803-X of 28 March 1980.

== Award statute ==
The Order of the Red Star was awarded to soldiers of the Soviet Army, Navy, border and internal security forces, employees of the State Security Committee of the USSR, as well as NCOs and officers of the bodies of internal affairs; to units, warships, associations, enterprises, institutions and organisations; as well as to military personnel of foreign countries:

- for personal courage and bravery in battle, for the excellent organisation and leadership in combat that contributed to the success of our troops;
- for successful operations of military units and formations which resulted in the enemy suffering considerable casualties or damage;
- for outstanding service in ensuring public safety and the security of the State Border of the USSR;
- for courage and valour displayed during the performance of military duties, or, in circumstances involving a risk to life;
- for exemplary performance of special command tasks and other outstanding deeds committed in peacetime;
- for great contribution in maintaining the high combat readiness of troops, excellent performance in combat and political training, in the mastery of new combat equipment and other services associated with strengthening the defensive might of the USSR;
- for merit in the development of military science and technologies used in training of the Armed Forces of the USSR;
- for merit in strengthening the defence capabilities of the socialist community.

The Order of the Red Star is worn on the right side of the chest and when in the presence of other orders of the USSR, placed immediately after the Order of the Patriotic War 2nd class. If worn in the presence of Orders or medals of the Russian Federation, the latter have precedence.

== Long service award ==
The Order of the Red Star was also used as a long service award from 1944 to 1958 to mark fifteen years of service in the military, state security, or police. Decree of the Presidium of the Supreme Soviet of the USSR of 14 September 1957 emphasised the devaluation of certain Soviet high military Orders used as long service awards instead of their originally intended criteria. This led to the joint 25 January 1958 decree of the Ministers of Defence, of Internal Affairs and of the Chairman of the Committee on State Security of the USSR establishing the Medal "For Impeccable Service" putting an end to the practice.

== Award description ==
The Order of the Red Star is a red enamelled 47mm to 50mm wide (depending on the variant) silver five pointed star. In the centre of the obverse, an oxydised silver shield bearing the image of an erect soldier wearing an overcoat and carrying a rifle, along the shield's entire circumference, a narrow band bearing the Communist motto in relief, "Workers of the world, unite!" (Russian: «Пролетарии всех стран, соединяйтесь!»), the band below the soldier bore the relief inscription "USSR" (Russian: «СССР»). Below the shield, the hammer and sickle also of oxydised silver. The otherwise plain reverse bore the maker's mark and the award serial number. The Order was attached to clothing by a threaded stud and screw attachment.

When the order wasn't worn, a ribbon could be worn in its stead on the ribbon bar on the left side of the chest. The ribbon of the Order of the red Star was a 24mm wide silk moiré dark red with a 5mm wide central silver stripe.

== Noteworthy recipients (partial list) ==
The Order of the Red Star was awarded 6 times to 5 people, 5 times to more than 15 people, four times to more than 150 people, three times to more than 1,000 people. Below is a short partial list of such multiple recipients:

=== Six times ===
- Colonel Philip Petrovich Onoprienko
- Colonel Peter Petrovich Panchenko
- Lieutenant Colonel Vasily Vasilevich Silantyev

=== Five times ===
- Colonel Konstantin Ivanovich Malkhasyan
- Major General Ivan Nikiforovich Stepanenko
- Colonel Alexey Petrovich Yakimov

=== Four times ===
- Lieutenant General Galaktion Alpaidze
- Colonel General Georgy Baydukov
- Colonel General Alexander Ivanovich Babaev
- Colonel Valentin Gavrilov
- General Gaysin, V.B.

=== Three times ===
- Captain Zelig Fisher
- Lieutenant Colonel Naum Shusterman
- Lieutenant Colonel Anatoly Lebed
- Lieutenant Colonel Korolev Alexey Denisovich
- Army General Alexei Yepishev
- Army General Gennady Ivanovich Obaturov
- Captain (navy) Asaf Abdrakhmanov
- Lieutenant General Alexander Vasilyevich Belyakov
- Rear Admiral Aksel Berg
- Admiral Nikolai Sergeyev
- Aviator Olga Yamshchikova
- Major Marina Chechneva
- Major Samuil Kovner
- Major General Лукашев, Василий Васильевич
- Skarzhinsky, Nikolai Vladimirovich a Soviet serviceman, who served in the Soviet 327th anti-tank battalion of the 253rd Rifle Division

=== Twice ===
- Marshal of the Soviet Union Sergey Akhromeyev
- Marshal of the Soviet Union Nikolai Bulganin
- Major General Hazi Aslanov
- Major General Georgy Beregovoy
- Colonel General Igor Rodionov
- Sergey Ilyushin
- Semyon Nomokonov
- Colonel Ivan Kozhedub
- Colonel Dmitry Loza
- Marshal of Aviation Alexander Pokryshkin
- Marshal of the Soviet Union Boris Shaposhnikov
- Senior Sergeant Yakov Pavlov
- Admiral Arseniy Golovko
- Rear Admiral Vladimir Konovalov
- Admiral Gordey Levchenko
- Admiral Ivan Stepanovich Yumashev
- Army General Ivan Yefimovich Petrov
- Colonel Semyon Zelensky
- War photographer Robert Diament

=== Singles ===
- Major General Isaak Zaltsman
- Admiral Nikolay Gerasimovich Kuznetsov
- Astronaut Vladimir Komarov
- Ivan Gevorkian, famous Soviet Armenian surgeon and scientist.
- Pavel Sukhoi
- Natalya Kovshova, Red Army sniper. First Woman to receive the Red Star.
- Andrei Tupolev
- Astronaut Andriyan Nikolayev
- Astronaut Pavel Popovich
- Philosopher Grigori Pomerants
- Major General Valery Bykovsky
- Major Pavel Belyayev
- Major General Alexei Leonov
- Senior Lieutenant Simon Alexandrovich Marcus
- Mikhail Mil
- Heydar Aliyev
- Evdokia Zavaliy
- Astronaut Vladimir Dzhanibekov
- Pilot Khiuaz Dospanova
- Major Yakov Drob
- Lieutenant General Alexander Lebed
- Vasily Degtyaryov
- Marshal of the Soviet Union Vasily Chuikov
- Physicist Georgy Mihailovich Kondratiev
- Manhattan Project spy Harry Gold (secret)
- World War II Soviet spy Elizabeth Bentley (secret)
- Cold War Nuclear Submariner, Seaman Sergei Preminin
- Guards Sergeant Mariya Borovichenko
- Vice Admiral Vasily Arkhipov
- Tamara Pamyatnykh, female fighter pilot
- Ants Laaneots
- Aleksandr Solzhenitsyn commander of a sound-ranging battery in the Red Army and Nobel laureate for literature.
- Aleksandra Shlyakhova
- Mikhail Konstantinovich Kudryavtsev
- Colonel Nikolai Petrov, Deputy head of Moscow Anti-Aircraft Defences
- Olga Avilova, surgeon
- Ilya Devin, writer
- Lieutenant Mikhail Golobokov
- Victor Stern
- Senior Lieutenant Алишев Ахан
- Cosmonaut Valentin Bondarenko, who died as the result of burns sustained in a fire during a 15-day low-pressure endurance experiment as a part of the Soviet space programme.
- Lieutenant Charles Thau

=== Units ===
- Alexandrov Ensemble
- 89th Rifle Division
- 9th Infantry Division
- 80th Airmobile Regiment
- 8th Army Corps
- 7th Guards Airborne Division
- 10th Guards Motor Rifle Division
- 35th Guards Motor Rifle Division

In 2015 the Order of the Red Star award awarded to Ukrainian army units were removed as part of a removal of Soviet awards and decorations from Ukrainian military units.
