= Danutė Stanelienė =

Soviet machine gunner (1922–1994)

- Stanelienė, 1945
- Born: 20 April 1922; Pelucmurgiai village, Marijampolė County, Lithuania
- Died: 8 August 1994 (aged 72); Vilnius, Lithuania
- Other name: Danutė Markauskienė
- Military career
- Allegiance: Soviet Union
- Branch: Red Army
- Service years: 1942–1945
- Rank: Starshina
- Unit: 167th Infantry Regiment
- Conflicts: World War II
- Awards: Order of Glory (1st, 2nd and 3rd class); Order of the October Revolution; Order of the Patriotic War (1st class); Medal "For Courage"; Order of the Red Banner of Labour

Danutė Stanelienė (20 April 1922 – 8 August 1994) was a machine gunner in the 167th Infantry Regiment of the 16th Lithuanian Rifle Division during World War II. On 24 March 1945, she became the first woman (of only four) to be awarded the Order of Glory 1st class.

== Early life ==
Stanelienė was born on 20 April 1922 to a Lithuanian peasant family in Pelucmurgiai village, Lithuania. Her mother died when she was just two years old, but her father later remarried. After completing her third grade of school she took care of her younger siblings from her father's second marriage in addition to working in agriculture. In 1940, she began working at a printing house; and after the start of the war, she was evacuated from the front to Nizhny Novgorod where she worked at a factory. In 1944, she became a member of the Communist Party.

== Military career ==
Stanelienė in class at the Lithuanian SSR Party School in November 1945

After voluntarily enlisting in the Red Army in February 1942 she began serving in a medical unit before transferring to become a cook. While she was a cook she met female machine gunner Lena Sergeyeva. Sergeyeva taught her how to fire a machine gun and told her about female machine gunners that fought in the Russian Civil War. Stanelienė asked her company commander to permit her to become a machine gunner when Sergeyeva was killed in battle. Permission granted, Stanelienė completed machine gunner's courses in December. She was assigned to the 167th Infantry Regiment of the 16th Lithuanian Rifle Division of the 4th Shock Army on the 1st Baltic Front.

Stanelienė first saw combat in the Battle of Kursk in Panskaya village where she gained respect from her colleagues for her techniques and patience. She would not immediately open fire on the enemy but instead waited for the enemy to advance closer before opening fire. In an engagement on 16 July 1943, three of her fingers were torn off by shrapnel from enemy fire. Nevertheless, she continued firing on enemy infantry despite her injuries. She stayed at her post until another soldier came to take over. While recovering in the hospital, she was awarded the Medal "For Courage".

After being released from the hospital and rejoining her regiment, she fought in the battle to retake a train station in the village of Rodnye. After the Red Army launched the raid on the station the Axis launched a barrage of counterattacks, including airstrikes and artillery fire. After her company commander was wounded in an airstrike and could no longer fight, she took over his machine gun and began firing on advancing Axis infantry forces and later chose places to reposition machine guns when her platoon was nearly fully surrounded by enemy forces. Stanelienė continued fighting and stayed in her machine gun nest to repel counterattacks while waiting for reinforcements to arrive after most of her unit was unable to continue on fighting. For her actions in that engagement she was awarded the Order of Glory 3rd class on 3 January 1944.

She was awarded her second Order of Glory on 26 August 1944 for her actions near the city of Polotsk in early July, in which she established her machine gun post on the line of fire and repelled thirteen counterattacks, waiting for enemy infantry to approach before shooting them at nearly point-blank range.

Stanelienė became a full cavalier of the Order of Glory on 24 March 1945 for her actions in the Baltic offensive, making her the first woman to become a full bearer of the award. While advancing in a forest, an Axis sniper shot at her and missed, but she determined his position and finished him off with her submachine gun. While advancing to the Klaipėda–Tilsit highway, Stanelienė and her unit exchanged fire with enemy soldiers and took most of the enemy soldiers prisoner after killing several of them. In that same advance, she killed three enemy submachine gunners throughout late 1944.

== Postwar life ==
After the end of the war, Stanelienė was demobilized from the Red Army with the rank of starshina and worked for a local district committee of the Communist Party and later the Council of Ministers in Vilnius before managing the human resources department of a plastics factory. From 1946 to 1954 she was a deputy in the Supreme Soviet. She was part of the 1970 Victory Day Parade in Moscow and was assigned to walk in the front row of marchers with other full bearers of the Order of Glory. She died at the age of 72 in Vilnius and was buried in the Saltoniškės cemetery.

== Awards and honors ==
- Three Orders of Glory (1st class – 24 March 1945, 2nd class – 26 August 1944, 3rd class – 3 January 1944)
- Order of the October Revolution (20 April 1971)
- Order of the Patriotic War 1st class (11 March 1985)
- Medal "For Courage" (18 July 1943)
- Order of the Red Banner of Labour (20 July 1950)
- Medal "For Labour Valour" (1 October 1965)
- Campaign and jubilee medals

== See also ==
- Manshuk Mametova
- Nina Onilova
