= Order of the Red Banner =

Military decoration of the Soviet Union

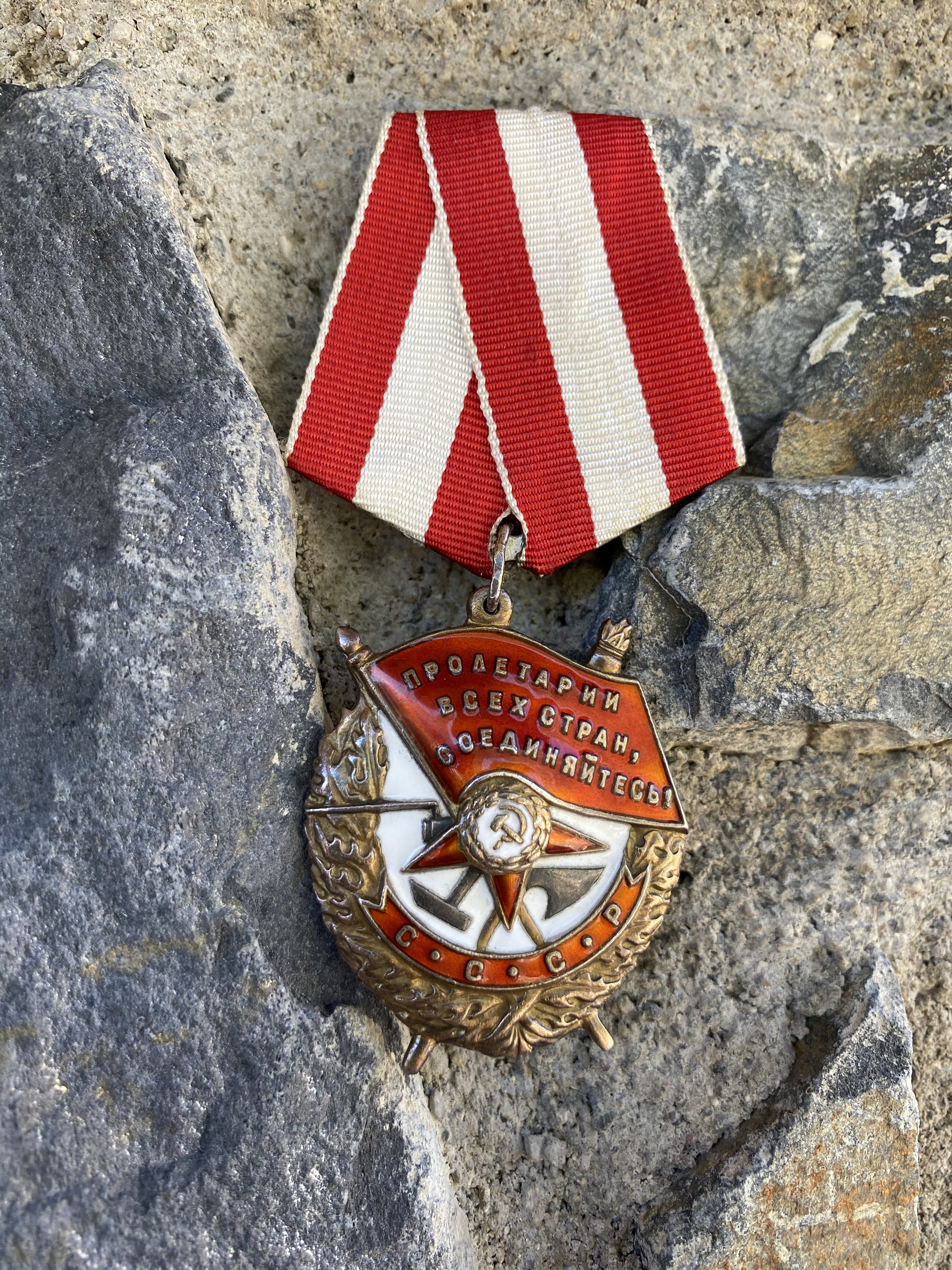
- The Order of the Red Banner
- Type: Single-grade order
- Awarded for: Heroism in combat or long service in the armed forces
- Presented by: Soviet Union
- Eligibility: Soviet Citizens, certain objects, groups.
- Status: No longer awarded
- Established: August 1, 1924
- Final award: 1991

Highlights
- Total: 581,300
- Ribbon of the Order of the Red Banner

Precedence
- Next (higher): Order of the October Revolution
- Equivalent: Order of the Red Banner of Labour
- Next (lower): Order of Suvorov

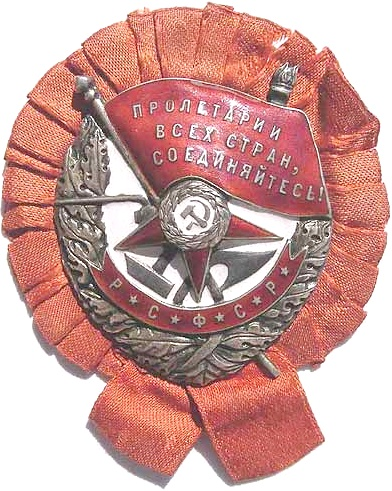
First variant Russian Order of the Red Banner on red cloth from 1918 to 1924

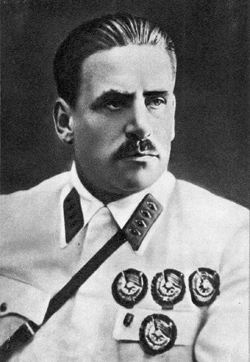
Marshal of the Soviet Union Vasily Blyukher wearing four first variant Orders of the Red Banner

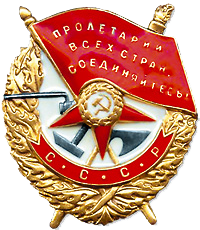
Early variant Soviet Order of the Red Banner

Naval ensign of a Military Order of the Red Banner vessel

The Order of the Red Banner (Russian: Орден Красного Знамени, romanised: Orden Krasnogo Znameni) was the first Soviet military decoration. The Order was established on 16 September 1918, during the Russian Civil War by decree of the All-Russian Central Executive Committee. It was the highest award of Soviet Russia, subsequently the Soviet Union, until the Order of Lenin was established in 1930. Recipients were recognised for extraordinary heroism, dedication, and courage demonstrated on the battlefield. The Order was awarded to individuals as well as to military units, cities, ships, a train, political and social organisations, and state enterprises. In later years, it was also awarded on the twentieth and again on the thirtieth anniversary of military, police, or state security service without requiring participation in combat (the "Long Service Award" variant).

== Award history ==
The Russian Order of the Red Banner was established during the Russian Civil War by decree of the All-Russian Central Executive Committee of September 16, 1918.

The first recipient was Vasily Blyukher on September 28, 1918. The second recipient was Iona Yakir.

During the Civil War, similarly named orders and decorations existed, which were established by the Soviet communist governments of several other constituent and nonconstituent republics. The August 1, 1924, decree of the All-Russian Central Executive Committee established the all-Soviet Order of the Red Banner for deserving personnel of the Red Army.

Other nonmilitary awards also used the phrase "Order of the Red Banner" in their title; for example, the Order of the Red Banner of Labour was presented for acts of great scientific, military (technical or logistic), manufacturing, or agricultural achievement.

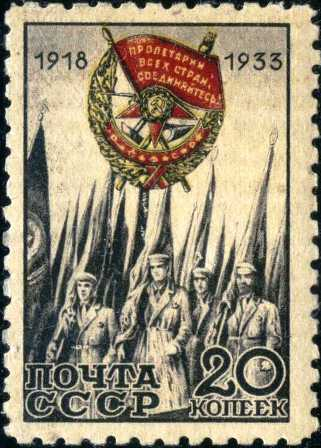
1933 stamp marking the 15th anniversary of the Order of the Red Banner

From 1918 till the late 1930s there was also a Soviet collective variant – the Revolutionary Red Banner of Honor. This was in the form of a special military color awarded to distinguished Red Army, Soviet Air Force, and Soviet Navy units. It was older than the Order of the Red Banner, having been established on August 3, 1918, a month and several weeks before.

== Award statute ==
As a military decoration, the Order of the Red Banner recognised heroism in combat or otherwise extraordinary accomplishments of military valour during combat operations. Before the establishment of the Order of Lenin on April 5, 1930, the Order of the Red Banner functioned as the highest (and practically the only) military order of the USSR. During World War II, under various titles (including the Order of the Red Banner of Military Valour and Order of the Red Banner for Maritime Valour), it was presented to both individuals and military units for acts of extreme military heroism. In some ways, the Order of the Red Banner was more prestigious, as it could only be awarded for bravery during combat operations. In contrast, the Order of Lenin was sometimes awarded to non-military personnel and political leaders. Nearly all well-known Soviet commanders became recipients of the Order of the Red Banner.

When the Order was awarded to whole formations, the prefix "Red Banner" was added to their official designations. Naval vessels also flew a special ensign.

== Long service award ==
The Order of the Red Banner was also used as a "long service award" between 1944 and 1958 to mark twenty and thirty years of service in the military, state security, or police. Decree of the Presidium of the Supreme Soviet of the USSR of September 14, 1957, emphasised the devaluation of certain Soviet high military Orders used as long service awards instead of their originally intended criteria. This led to the joint January 25, 1958, decree of the Ministers of Defence, of Internal Affairs, and of the Chairman of the Committee on State Security of the USSR establishing the Medal "For Impeccable Service," putting an end to the practice of awarding long service variants of the Order of the Red Banner.

== Award description ==
The Order, made of silver, consisted of a white-enamelled badge, which had a golden Hammer and Sickle badge surrounded by two golden panicles of wheat on a Red Star, backed by crossed hammer, plough, torch, and a red flag bearing the motto "Proletarians of all countries, Unite!". Two golden panicles of wheat surrounded the whole; at the bottom were the letters "SSSR" (Russian: СССР). Additional awards of the Order bore a white enamelled shield with a silver sequence number at the bottom of the obverse. A recipient of multiple Orders of the Red Banner would wear a basic badge of the Order with a numeral corresponding to the sequence of the award on a cartouche over the wheat at the bottom of the badge.

The early variants of the Order were screw-back badges to allow wear on clothing. Later variants (from 1943) hung from a standard Soviet pentagonal mount with a ring through the suspension loop. The mount was covered with an overlapping 24mm wide red silk moiré ribbon with 1.5mm wide white edge stripes and a 7mm wide white central stripe.

The Order of the Red Banner was worn on the left side of the chest and when in the presence of other Orders and medals of the USSR, was placed immediately after the Order of the October Revolution. If worn in the presence of Orders or medals of the Russian Federation, the latter have precedence.

== Notable recipients (partial list) ==
=== Individuals ===
- Leon Trotsky
- Hendrik Allik
- Kliment Voroshilov (6 times)
- Oka Gorodovikov (6 times)
- Vasily Arkhipov
- Joseph Beyrle, US Army POW
- Sergey Biryuzov
- Vasily Blokhin (2 times)
- Vasily Blyukher (first recipient, in total 5 times)
- Gleb Bokii
- György Lukács
- Hayk Bzhishkyan (2 times)
- Volodia Dubinin
- Irina Dryagina
- Aleksa Dundić
- Pavel Dybenko (3 times)
- Yevdokiya Zavaly
- Ivan Fedyuninsky (5 times)
- Ivan Ivanovich Pstygo (7 times)
- Ivan Kozhedub (7 times)
- Leonid Govorov
- Alexander Gorbatov
- Irina Sebrova (3 times)
- Bolesław Kontrym (3 times)
- Max Hoelz
- Ursula Kuczynski
- Konstantin Krasavin (3 times)
- Rodion Malinovsky (3 times)
- Vasily Zaytsev (2 times)
- Kim Il Sung
- Mikhail Petrovich Minin
- Semyon Nomokonov
- Kim Philby
- Sergei Mironovich Kirov
- Issa Pliyev (3 times)
- Alexander Pylcyn
- Alexander Radó
- Naum Shusterman
- Evgeniy Ignatievich Skarzhinsky(3 times)
- Abram Slutsky (2 times)
- Pavel Solovyov
- Ios Teper
- Semyon Timoshenko (5 times)
- Philip Tseitlin
- Gabriel Ilyich Urazovsky
- Aleksandr Vasilevsky (2 times)
- Alexander Vekman (2 times)
- Nikolai Vlasik (4 times)
- Mikhail Vodopyanov
- Iona Yakir (second recipient, in total 3 times)
- Mikhail Yefremov
- Nikolai Vladimirovich Zateyev (for actions during K-19 crisis, 4 July 1961)
- Georgy Zhukov (3 times)
- Vyacheslav Ivanovich Zof
- Flight attendant Nadezhda Kurchenko
- Flight attendant Tamara Zharkaya
- Clara Zetkin
- Hoàng Văn Thái
- Vasily Ignatenko
- Zinoviy Kolobanov
- Nina Lobkovskaya
- Sergei Ivanovich Safronov
- Mikhail Golovatov
- Yakov Novichenko
- Aleksandra Shlyakhova
- Mikhail Devyataev
- Alexander Pokryshkin (four times)

=== Formations ===
- Baltic Fleet (twice)
- Soviet Northern Fleet
- Pacific Ocean Fleet
- Far Eastern Military District
- First Army
- First Guards Tank Army
- Second Guards Tank Army
- 1st Rifle Division
- 6th Rifle Division (Soviet Union)
- 24th Rifle Division
- 45th Rifle Division (awarded 1919)
- 27th Guards Rifle Division
- 39th Guards Rifle Division (twice)
- 19th Motor Rifle Division
- 62nd Rocket Division
- 76th Guards Airborne Division
- 85th Rifle Division
- 100th Guards Rifle Division
- 106th Guards Tula Airborne Division
- 17th Rifle Regiment, 32nd Rifle Division
- 72nd Mechanized Brigade (Ukraine)
- Groupe de Chasse 3 Normandie "Niémen" (France)
- Ensemble of Song and Dance of the Russian Army aka the Red Army Choir (twice)

== Individual feats ==
Feats of valour worthy of the award of the Order of the Red Banner were as much against internal as against external enemies of the USSR, as detailed below:

- Stalin's Chief Executioner (and eventually NKVD Major General) Vasili Mikhailovich Blokhin was awarded his Order in 1941 for leading a company of executioners that performed and supervised numerous mass executions during Stalin's reign, including more than 7,000 Poles over the course of several consecutive days.
- Pavel Dybenko won three Orders of the Red Banner, his first in the 1921 bloody suppression of the naval rebellion in Kronstadt, his two other Orders in 1922 in the suppression of peasants uprisings.
- Sasha Fillipov received his posthumous Order in 1944 for spying on, and being executed by, the Germans during the Battle of Stalingrad.
- Private Mikhail Minin was awarded the Order of the Red Banner for being the first to enter the Reichstag building on April 30, 1945, during the Battle of Berlin, and the first soldier to mount the red flag on its roof at 10:40 pm.
- Major General Mikhail Vasilyevich Vodopyanov was awarded two of his four Orders of the Red Banner for his leadership of long-range bomber groups during World War II, often personally leading the missions.
- Captain Vasily Zaytsev, won his Order as a sniper during the Battle of Stalingrad in Nov–Dec 1942, killed over 200 enemy soldiers, including 11 enemy snipers.

== Media ==
- In George Orwell's Animal Farm (1945), a satire on the Soviet Union, an order called the Order of the Green Banner is created.
- William Craig's nonfiction book, Enemy at the Gates: The Battle for Stalingrad (1973), based partially on and depicting the exploits and successful tactics of Zaytsev, was made into a feature-length film, Enemy at the Gates, (2001), starring Jude Law as Zaytsev. Zaytsev's tactics are required reading for US snipers.

== See also ==
- Orders, decorations, and medals of the Soviet Union
- Order of Lenin
- Order of the October Revolution
- Order of the Red Banner of Labour
