= Medal "For Courage" (Russia) =

Medal "For Courage" (Medal "For Valour")
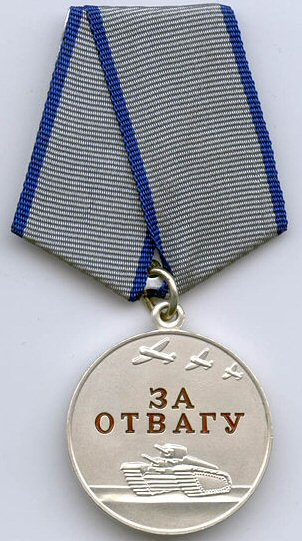
- Medal "For Courage"
- Type: State Decoration
- Awarded for: Courage displayed: in combat
- Presented by: Russian Federation; USSR
- Eligibility: Citizens of the Russian Federation
- Status: Active
- Established: 17 October 1938
- First award: 1938
- Ribbon of the Medal "For Courage"

Precedence
- Next (higher): Medal of the Order "For Merit to the Fatherland" 2nd Class
- Next (lower): Medal of Suvorov

The Medal "For Courage" or Medal "For Valour" (Russian: Медаль «За отвагу») is a state decoration of the Russian Federation that was retained from the Soviet awards system following the dissolution of the USSR.

== Award history ==
The Medal "For Courage" was created by the decision of the Presidium of the Supreme Soviet of the USSR on 17 October 1938. It was awarded to soldiers of the Soviet Army, Navy, border and internal troops and other citizens of the USSR, as well as to persons who are not citizens of the USSR, for personal courage and bravery displayed in battles against the enemies of the socialist fatherland, while protecting the state border of the USSR, during the performance of military duties in circumstances involving a risk to life.

The first three Medals for Courage were awarded only three days later to three border guards for acts of bravery during the Battle of Lake Khasan. More than 4.2 million were awarded during the Great Patriotic War. From its creation in 1938 to the fall of the Soviet Union in 1991, 4,569,893 medals were awarded, many posthumously.

By Presidential Decree № 442 of 2 March 1994, the Medal "For Courage" was retained by the Russian Federation after the dissolution of the Soviet Union, with the same basic design save for the caption "USSR" (Russian: CCCP) on the lower obverse. Its award criteria were amended on three occasions by three separate Presidential Decrees, № 19 of 6 January 1999, № 444 of 17 April 2003 and № 1099 of 7 September 2010.

By Decree of the President of Russia of 13 November 1993, the first recipients of the Russian Federation Medal "For Courage" were soldiers of the 3rd Separate Special Purpose Brigade of the GRU, for performing special combat missions in the Republic of Tajikistan.

== Modern statute ==
The Medal "For Courage" is awarded to military personnel, as well as to civilian employees of the Interior Ministry of the Russian Federation, of the State Fire Service of the Russian Ministry for Civil Defence, Emergency Situations and Disaster Relief and other citizens for personal courage and bravery displayed in combat in defence of the Fatherland and of the public interests of the Russian Federation; when performing special assignments to ensure the public safety of the Russian Federation; while protecting the state border of the Russian Federation; in the performance of military, official or civil duties while protecting the constitutional rights of citizens and in other circumstances involving a risk to life.

The Russian Federation Order of Precedence dictates the Medal "For Courage" is to be worn on the left breast with other medals immediately after the Medal of the Order "For Merit to the Fatherland" 2nd Class.

== Award description ==
The current Medal "For Courage" of the Russian Federation is a 34mm in diameter circular silver medal with a raised rim on both the obverse and reverse. On the obverse, in the upper part are three aircraft flying from right to left. Below the aircraft is the impressed and red enamelled inscription in two lines "FOR COURAGE" (Russian: «ЗА ОТВАГУ») and below the inscription is a (T-35) tank with its forward left corner closest to the front. The original Soviet medal had an additional impressed and red enameled inscription "USSR" (Russian «CCCP») below the tank just above and following the curvature of the medal's obverse lower rim; the current medal has no such inscription. The medal's reverse is plain except for an embossed letter "N" followed by a horizontal line in the lower half reserved for the award serial number, and a mint mark below it.

The medal is secured to a standard Russian pentagonal mount by a ring through the medal suspension loop. The mount is covered in a silk moiré 24mm wide grey ribbon with a blue 2mm edge stripe on each side. The original Soviet award (1938 to 1943) hung from a small square mount covered with a red ribbon.

| 1938–1943 | 1943–1991 | 1994 to date |
| Early Soviet Variant | | Russian Federation Variant |
| Early; Soviet variant | Soviet variant | Russian Federation variant |

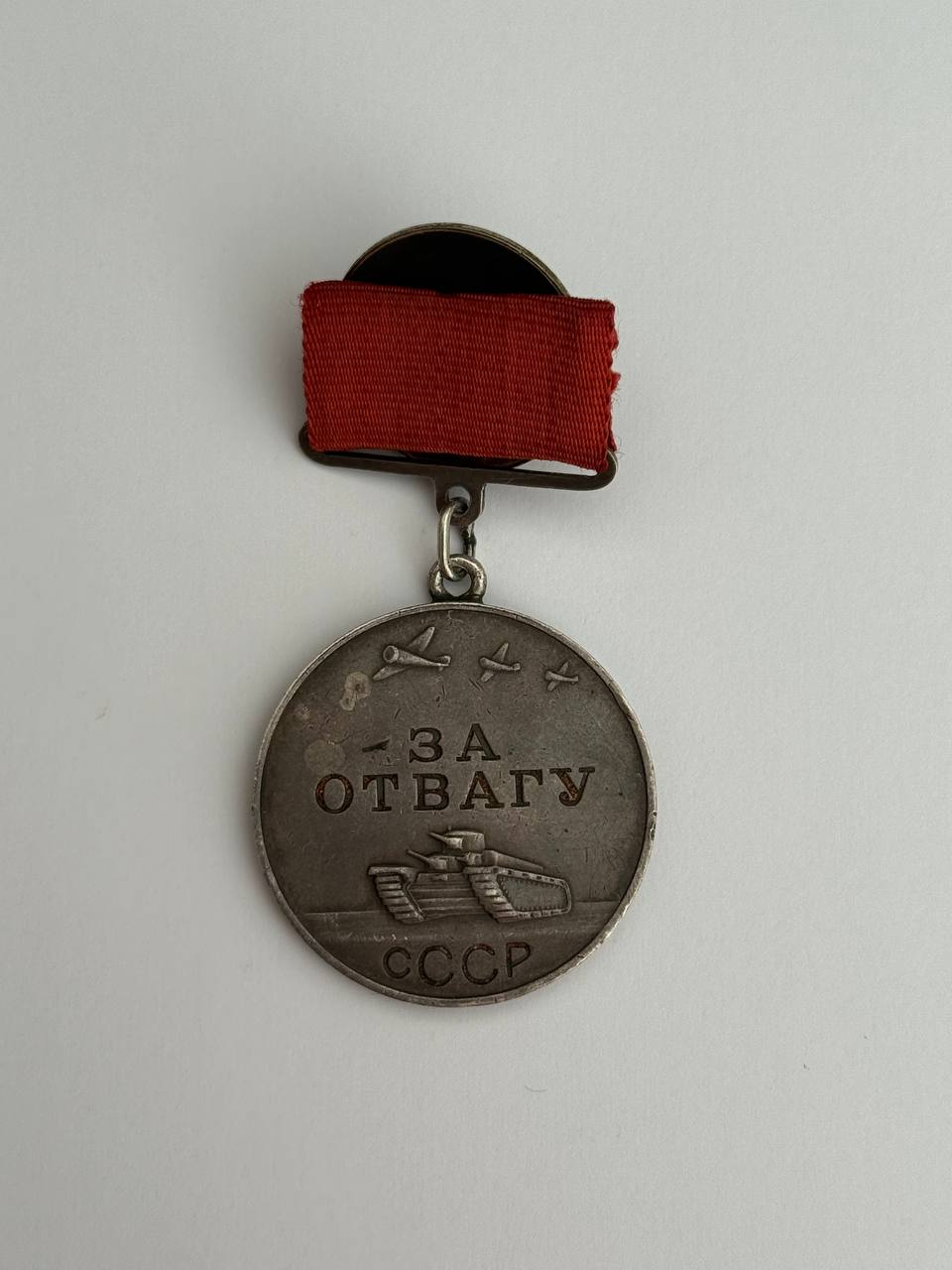
Medal "For Courage" 1942

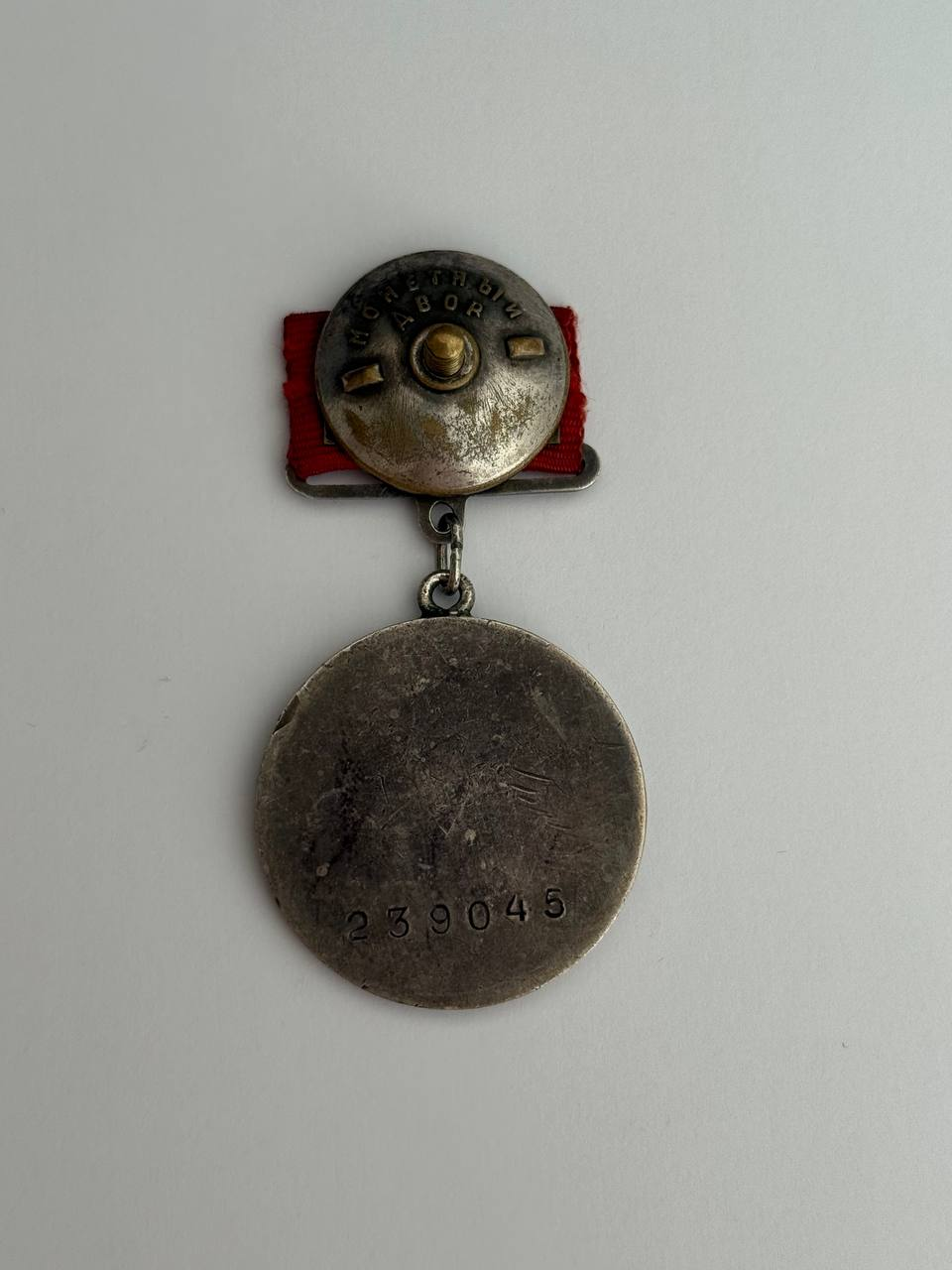
Medal "For Courage" 1942

== Notable recipients ==
=== Awarded by the Soviet Union ===
- Senior Sergeant Shanina, Roza Georgiyevna
- Captain Zaitsev, Vasily Grigoryevich
- Guards Sergeant Borovichenko, Mariya Sergeyevna
- Senior Medical NCO Gnarkovskaya, Valeriya Osipovna
- Sergeant Semyon Gretsov (awarded 6 times)
- Sergeant Shabsa Mashkautsan, Hero of the Soviet Union
- Junior Sergeant Anatoly Ivanovich Skarzhinsky
- Aleksandra Shlyakhova
- Lieutenant Charles Thau

=== Awarded by Russian Federation ===
- Alibek Delimkhanov, Chechen Lieutenant Colonel
- Boris Greineman (Grejniemann)
- Andrei Simonov
- Igor Korobov
- Igor Kostyukov
- Alexander Kots
- Roman Kutuzov
- Evgeniy Poddubny
- Sergey Surovikin
- Andrei Sukhovetsky
- Yunus-bek Yevkurov, Ingush soldier and politician
- Samir Bouaffad, Avar Sergeant (1997 - 2002)

== Sources ==
- Great Soviet Encyclopedia
- Kolesnikov G.A. & Rozhkov A.M., Orders and medals of the USSR, Moscow, Mil. lib., 1983.
