= Soviet women in World War II =

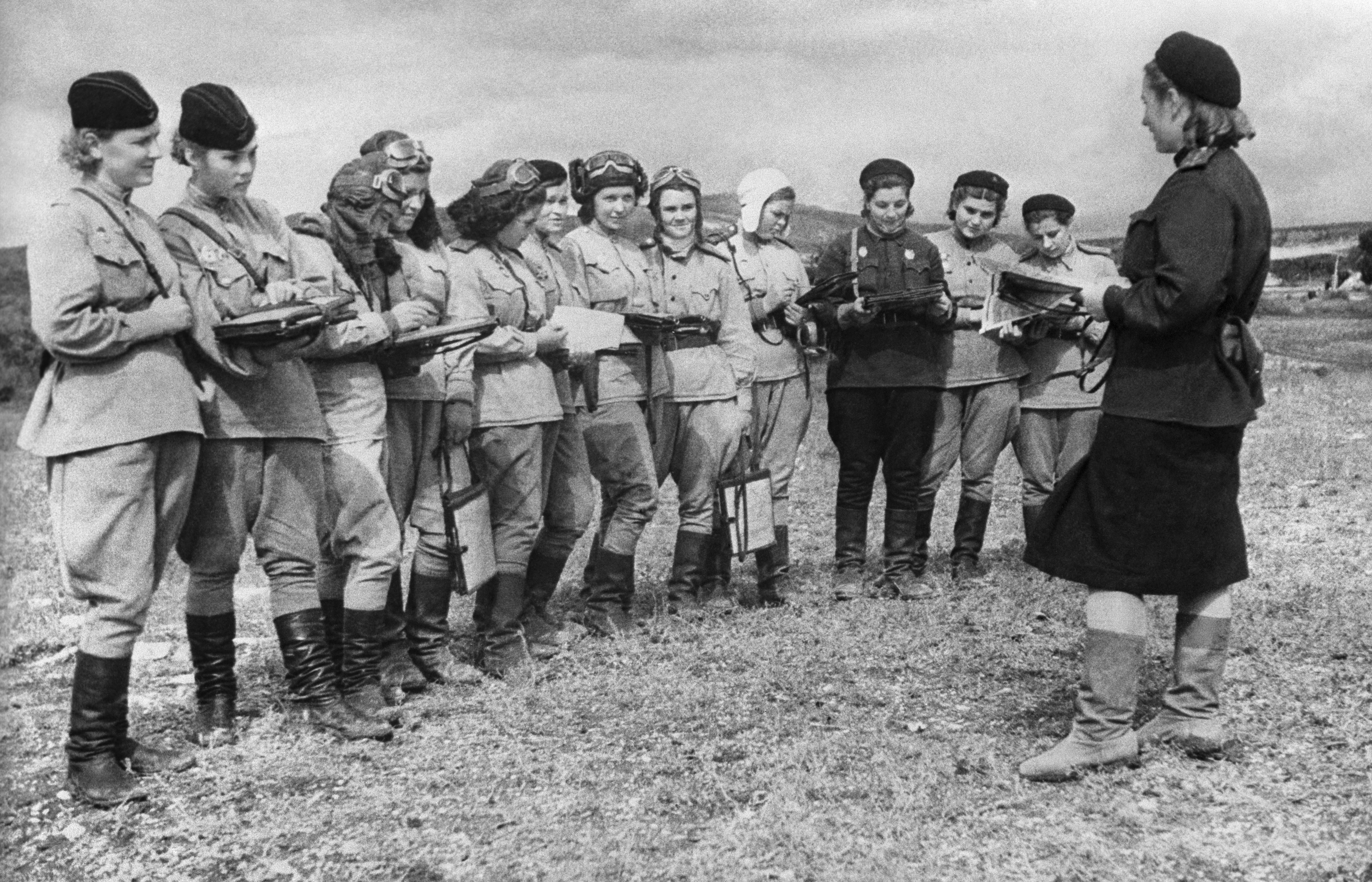
Soviet aviators of the all-female 46th Guards Night Bomber Regiment ("Night Witches"), 1943

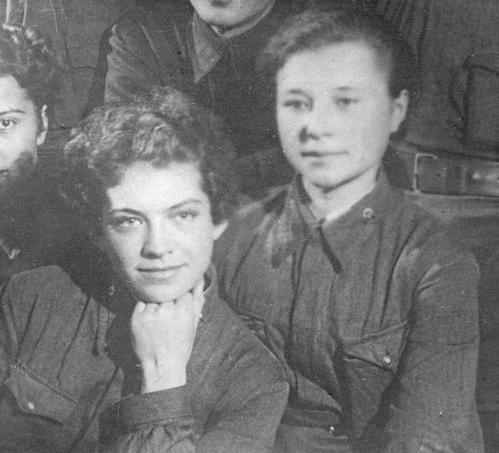
Snipers Natalya Kovshova and Mariya Polivanova became posthumous Heroines of the Soviet Union after committing suicide in battle to avoid capture by German forces.

Women played an important role in the Soviet Union during World War II. Most worked in civilian roles in industry, transport, and agriculture, among other fields—working double or more shifts to make up for the shortage of men who were deployed on the Eastern Front. However, around 800,000 women served in the Red Army as well, with the majority working in medical units with their male counterparts. At peak, they accounted for roughly 5% of the country's total military personnel during the conflict.

Overall, the number of female personnel in the Red Army was 348,309 in 1943, 473,040 in 1944, and 463,503 in 1945. Out of all medical personnel in the Red Army, women comprised 40% of paramedics, 43% of surgeons, 46% of doctors, 57% of medical assistants, and 100% of nurses. Nearly 200,000 women were decorated and 89 of them eventually gained the status of Heroine of the Soviet Union, which was the country's highest honorary title. Among these recipients were pilots, snipers, machine gunners, tank crew members and partisans, and those who were in auxiliary roles.

Following Germany's invasion of the Soviet Union on 22 June 1941, thousands of women who volunteered to enlist were turned away. An informal atmosphere in the military establishment initially sought to keep women out of combat zones, but these attitudes were forced to change as Soviet troops continued to sustain extremely heavy casualties in fierce fighting throughout the European theatre. This shifting reality ensured the emergence of greater opportunities for women who wished to take part in military operations.

== Aviators ==
For Soviet women aviators, instrumental to this change was Marina Raskova, a famous Soviet aviator, occasionally referred to as the "Russian Amelia Earhart". Raskova became famous as both a pilot and a navigator in the 1930s. She was the first woman to become a navigator in the Red Air Force in 1933. A year later she started teaching at the Zhukovsky Air Academy, also a first for a woman. When World War II broke out, there were numerous women who had training as pilots and many immediately volunteered. While there were no formal restrictions on women serving in combat roles, their applications tended to be blocked, run through red tape, etc. for as long as possible in order to discourage them from seeing combat. Raskova is credited with using her personal connections with Joseph Stalin to convince the military to form three combat regiments for women. Not only would the women be pilots, but the support staff and engineers for these regiments were women. Although all three regiments had been planned to have women exclusively, only the 588th would remain an all-women regiment. The Soviet Union was the first nation to allow women pilots to fly combat missions. These regiments with strength of almost a hundred airwomen, flew a combined total of more than 30,000 combat sorties, produced at least twenty Heroes of the Soviet Union, and included two fighter aces. This military unit was initially called Aviation Group 122 while the three regiments received training. After their training, the three regiments received their formal designations as follows:

The 586th Fighter Aviation Regiment: This unit was the first to take part in combat (April 16, 1942) of the three female regiments and take part in 4,419 combat missions (125 air battles and 38 kills). Lydia Litvyak and Yekaterina Budanova were assigned to the unit before joining the 437th IAP in the fighting over Stalingrad and became the world's only two female fighter aces (with 5 each, although soviet propaganda claims 12 and 11 victories respectively), both flying the Yak-1 fighter.

The 46th Taman Guards Night Bomber Aviation Regiment: This was the best known of the regiments and was commanded by Yevdokiya Bershanskaya. It originally began service as the 588th Night Bomber Regiment, but was redesignated in February 1943 as recognition for service which would tally almost 24,000 combat missions by the end of the war. Their aircraft was the Polikarpov Po-2, an outdated biplane. The Germans were the ones however who gave them the name that they are most well known as, The Night Witches.

The 125th Guards Bomber Aviation Regiment: Marina Raskova commanded this unit until her death in combat, and then the unit was assigned to Valentin Markov. It started service as the 587th Bomber Aviation Regiment until it was given the Guards designation in September 1943.

== Infantry ==
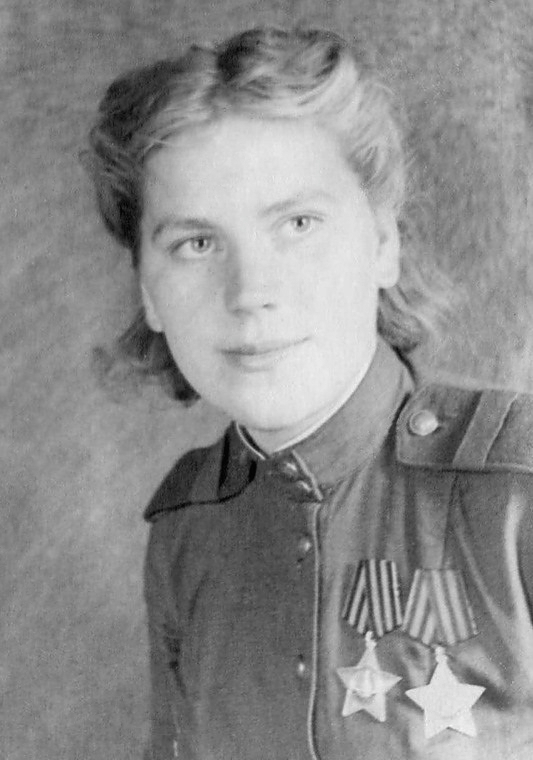
Roza Shanina, a graduate of the Central Women’s Sniper Training School who was credited with 59 confirmed kills.

The Soviet Union deployed women as snipers and in a variety of infantry roles. Between 1941 and 1945, a total of 2,484 Soviet female snipers were functioning in this role, of whom about 500 survived the war. Their combined tally of kill claims is at least 11,000. The most famous snipers during the war included Lyudmila Pavlichenko and Roza Shanina.

Women frequently served as medics and communication personnel, as well – in small numbers – as machine gunners, political officers, tank drivers, and in other parts of the infantry. Manshuk Mametova was a machine gunner from Kazakhstan and was the first Asian woman to receive the title Hero of the Soviet Union. Mariya Oktyabrskaya and Aleksandra Samusenko were tank drivers. Tatyana Kostyrina had over 120 kills and commanded an infantry battalion in 1943 following the death of her commander. Before its dissolution in 1944, the 1st Separate Women's Volunteer Rifle Brigade deployed thousands of women in a variety of combat roles.

Women crewed the majority of the anti-aircraft batteries employed in Stalingrad. Some batteries, including the 1077th Anti-Aircraft Regiment, also engaged in ground combat.

In response to the high casualties suffered by male soldiers, Stalin allowed planning which would replace men with women in second lines of defense, such as anti-aircraft guns and medical aid. These provided gateways through which women could gradually become involved in combat. For example, women comprised 43% of physicians, who were sometimes required to carry rifles as they retrieved men from firing zones. Through small opportunities like this, women gradually gained credibility in the military, eventually numbering 500,000 at any given time toward the end of the war.

== Partisans ==
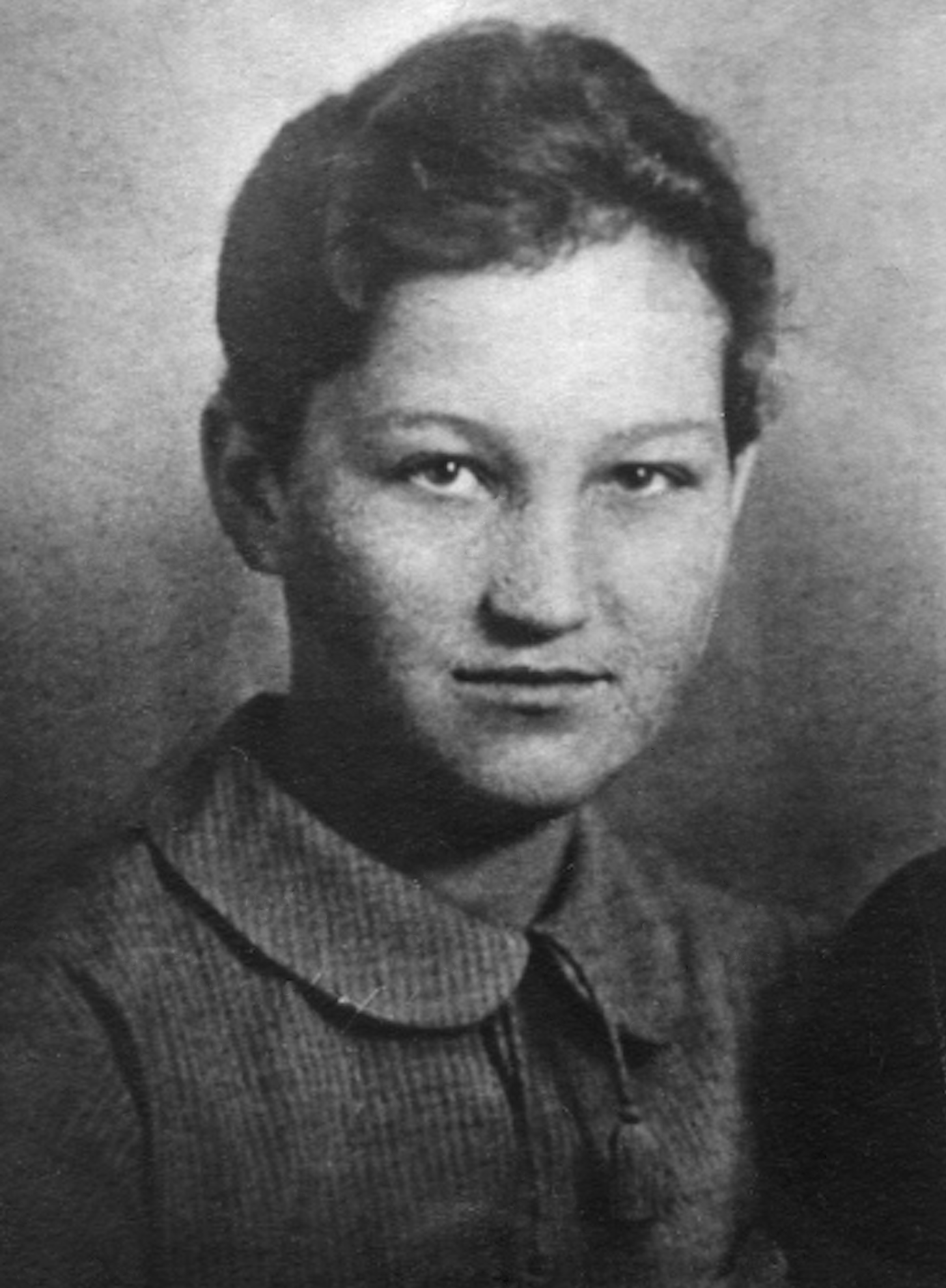
Partisan Zoya Kosmodemyanskaya, one of the most celebrated partisans in Soviet media.

Women constituted significant numbers of the Soviet partisans. One of the most famous was Zoya Kosmodemyanskaya. In October 1941, still an 18-year-old high school student in Moscow, she volunteered for a partisan unit. At the village of Obukhovo near Naro-Fominsk, Kosmodemyanskaya and other partisans crossed the front line and entered territory occupied by the Germans. She was arrested by the Nazis on a combat assignment near the village of Petrischevo (Moscow Oblast) in late November 1941. Kosmodemyanskaya was savagely tortured and humiliated, but did not give away the names of her comrades or her real name (claiming that it was Tanya). She was hanged on November 29, 1941. It was claimed that before her death Kosmodemyanskaya had made a speech with the closing words, "There are two hundred million of us; you can't hang us all!" Kosmodemyanskaya was the first woman to become Hero of the Soviet Union during the war (February 16, 1942).

The youngest woman to become a Hero of the Soviet Union was also a resistance fighter, Zinaida Portnova. In January 1944, she was captured. She shot one of her captors whilst trying to escape but was caught and killed, just short of her 18th birthday. In 1958, Portnova was posthumously made a Hero of the Soviet Union, there is a monument to her in the city of Minsk and some youth pioneer movement detachments were named after her.

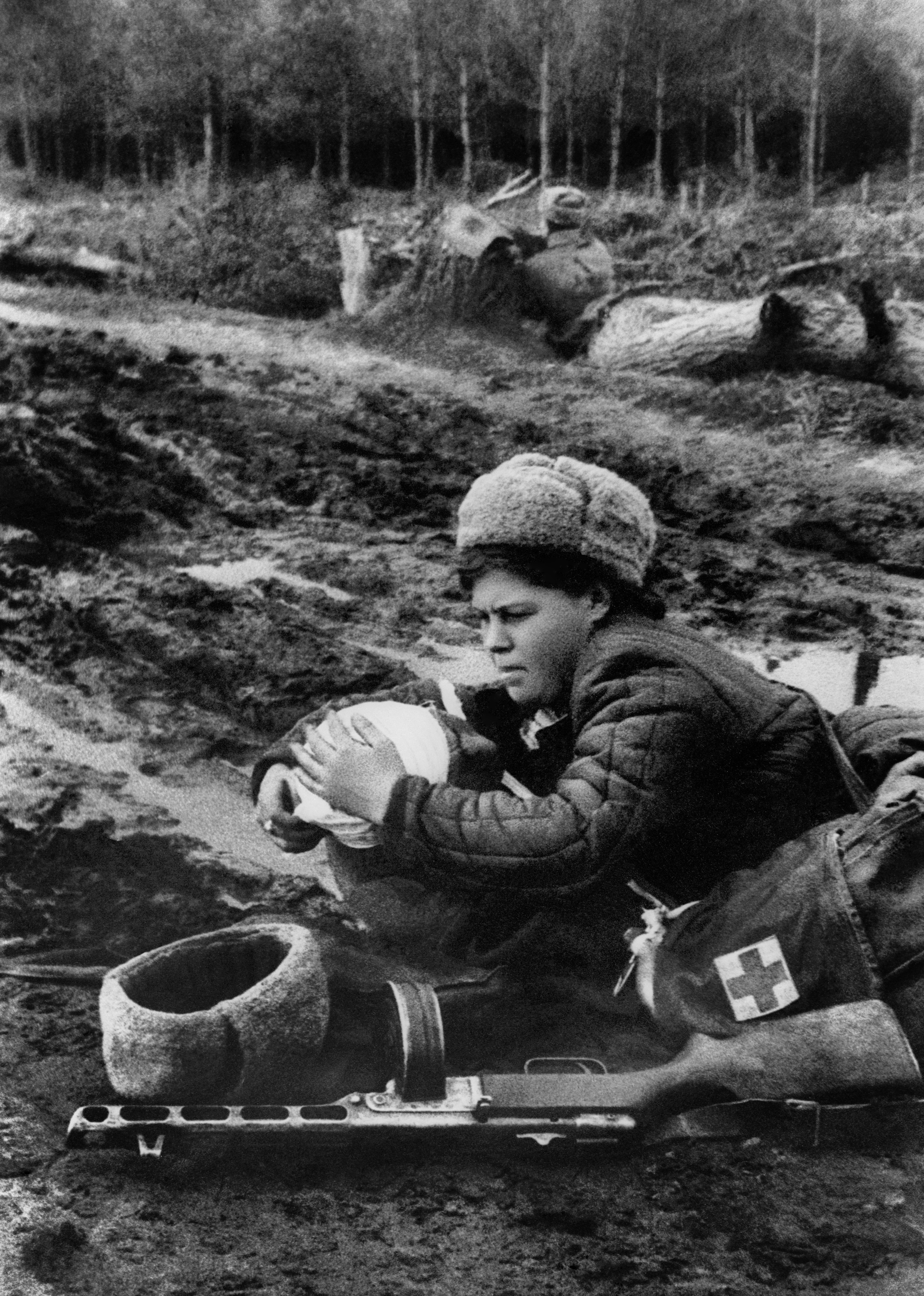
Women also served as combat medics; this image shows Senior sergeant Olga Borodzina (129th Oryol Red Banner Rifle Division) bandaging a wounded soldier in East Prussia, 1945.

== See also ==
- Women in the world wars
- Women in the Russian and Soviet military
- Women in the Russian Revolution

== Bibliography ==
- Alexievich, Svetlana (2017). The Unwomanly Face of War: An Oral History of Women in World War II. Random House. p. 384. ISBN 978-0399588723.
- Bergman, Jay. "Valerii Chkalov: Soviet Pilot as New Soviet Man," Journal of Contemporary History 33#1 (1998), pp. 135–152
- Campbell, D'Ann (April 1993). "Women in Combat: The World War Two Experience in the United States, Great Britain, Germany, and the Soviet Union" (PDF). Journal of Military History. 57: 301–323. Archived from the original on October 9, 2014.
- Cottam, K. Jean, ed. The Golden-Tressed Soldier (Manhattan, KS, Military Affairs/Aerospace Historian Publishing, 1983) on Soviet women
- Cottam, K. Jean. Soviet Airwomen in Combat in World War II (Manhattan, KS: Military Affairs/Aerospace Historian Publishing, 1983)
- Cottam, K. Jean. "Soviet Women in Combat in World War II: The Ground Forces and the Navy," International Journal of Women's Studies, 3, no. 4 (1980): 345–57
- Eglitis, Daina, and Vita Zelče. "Unruly actors: Latvian women of the Red Army in post-war historical memory." Nationalities Papers (2013) 41#6 pp: 987–1007.
- Engel, B. Alpern. "'The Womanly Face of War': Soviet Women Remember World War II" in N. N. Dombrowski, ed.) Women and War in the Twentieth Century: Enlisted with or without Consent, (Garland Publishing Inc., 1998)
- Erickson, J. "Soviet women at War" in J. Garrard and C. Garrard, eds., World War II and the Soviet People (St Martin's Press, 2002)
- Harris, Adrienne M. "After A Youth on Fire: The Woman Veteran in Iulia Drunina's Postwar Poetry." Aspasia (2013) 7#1 pp: 68–91.
- Jug, Steven G. "Red Army romance: Preserving masculine hegemony in mixed gender combat units, 1943–1944." Journal of War & Culture Studies 5#3 (2012): 321–334.
- Krylova, Anna. Soviet Women in Combat: A History of Violence on the Eastern Front (2010) excerpt and text search
- Krylova, Anna. "Stalinist Identity from the Viewpoint of Gender: Rearing a Generation of Professionally Violent Women‐Fighters in 1930s Stalinist Russia." Gender & History 16#3 (2004): 626–653.
- Markwick, Roger D., and Euridice Charon Cardona. Soviet Women on the Frontline in the Second World War (Palgrave Macmillan, 2012)
- Noggle, Anne (1994). A Dance With Death: Soviet Airwomen in World War II. College Station, Texas: Texas A&M University Press.
- Pennington, Reina. Wings, Women, and War: Soviet Airwomen in World War II Combat (2007) excerpt and text search ISBN 0-7006-1145-2
- Pennington, Reina. "Offensive Women: Women in Combat in the Red Army in the Second World War" Journal of Military History (2010) 74#3 pp 775–820, with full bibliography
- Reese, Roger R. Why Stalin's Soldiers Fought: The Red Army's Military Effectiveness in World War II (2011), ch 11–12 on women in the army.
- Stoff, Laurie. They Fought for the Motherland: Russia's Women Soldiers in World War I and the Revolution (University Press of Kansas, 2006)
- Strebe, Amy Goodpaster. Flying for Her Country: The American and Soviet Women Military Pilots of World War II (Praeger Security International, 2007).
- Timofeeva-Egorova, Anna. Over Fields of Fire: Flying the Sturmovik in Action on the Eastern Front, 1942–45 (Helion & Company, 2010).
- Timofeeva-Egorova, Anna. Red Sky, Black Death: A Soviet Woman Pilot's Memoir of the Eastern Front (Slavica Publishers, 2009).
- Yenne, Bill. The White Rose of Stalingrad: The Real-Life Adventure of Lidiya Vladimirovna Litvyak, the Highest Scoring Female Air Ace of All Time (Osprey Publishing, 2013).
