= Raziya Isqaqova =

Raziya Shakan-qizi Iskakova (Kazakh: Рәзия Шәкен-қызы Ысқақова, Russian: Разия Шакеновна Искакова; 25 October 1922—2010) was a Kazakh woman who was awarded the Florence Nightingale Medal in 1975 for saving wounded soldiers during World War II.

== Before the war ==
Iskakova was born in 1922 in Tumenaryk station, located in present-day Janakorgan District of Kazakhstan. She graduated from the Shymkent Medical College in 1938 and worked as the head of a village medical center and later worked as a paramedic during the construction of the Kirov canal.

== World War II ==
In 1941 she begged the local military draft board to allow her to serve in the army as a medic to help the war effort, as she had read in the newspaper about the formation of a Kazakh military division in Shymkent. She became a nurse in the 55th Tank Brigade and saw fierce combat in the battle on the Kursk Bulge and Ukraine. In one battle for the Kursk bulge she dragged four tankmen out of a burn tanks and worked in perilous conditions. She was wounded twice in the war, the second time quite severely. However, she continued to rescue soldiers after bandaging her left knee until a chief of staff insisted that she take a break and go to the hospital so that she would not lose her leg. For her bravery she was awarded the Order of the Red Star and the Medal "For Courage". During the war she saved 400 injured soldiers, participating in the battles for Stalingrad, Kursk, Kharkhov, Kyiv, Warsaw, and Berlin.

== Postwar ==
She was demobilized from the military in 1946 with the rank of senior lieutenant and then worked as a nurse in the Kazakh SSR after the war. In 1975 she was honored with the Florence Nightingale medal. She died in 2010.

== See also ==
- Manshuk Mametova
- Aliya Moldagulova
- Khiuaz Dospanova
