= EDMA (disambiguation) =

EDMA is a psychoactive drug and a substituted amphetamine

EDMA may also refer to:

- Augsburg Airport (ICAO code EDMA)
- Edma, a village in Ustyansky District, Arkhangelsk Oblast, Russia
- Encyclopédie Du Monde Actuel (The Encyclopedia of the Current World –EDMA)
- Electronic Dance Music Awards (also known as the EDMAs)
