= Women in the Russian and Soviet military =

Women have played many roles in the Russian and Soviet military history. Women played an important role in world wars in Russia and the Soviet Union, particularly during World War II.

As of March 2024, according to Russian Defence Minister, 37,500 women served in the Russian armed forces, while 275,000 were civilian personnel.

== World War I ==
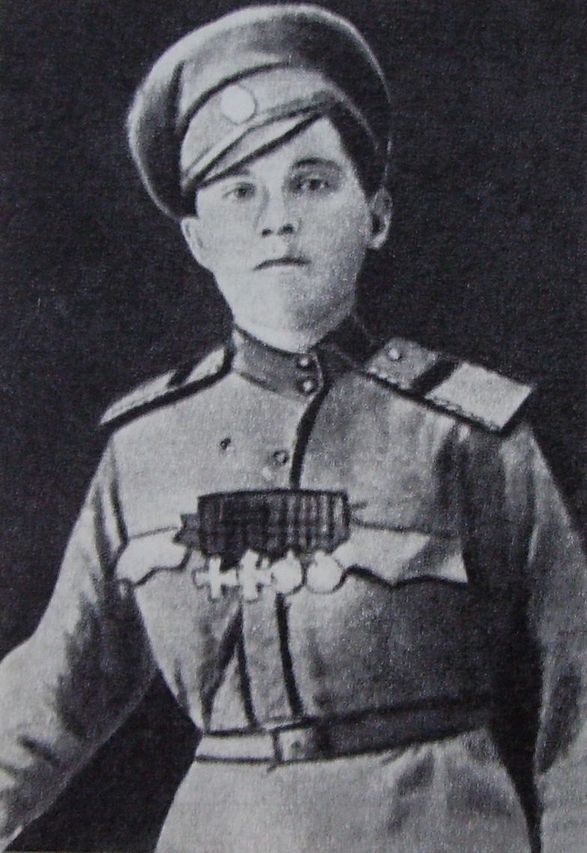
Antonina Palshina, who was awarded two Crosses of St. George (Russia) during WWI

Women served in the Russian armed forces in small numbers in the early stages of the war, but their numbers increased after heavy Russian losses such as at the Battle of Tannenberg and Masurian Lakes and a need for increased manpower. One such recruit was Maria Bochkareva who served with the 25th Reserve Battalion of the Russian Army. After the abdication of Nicholas II of Russia in March 1917, she convinced interim prime minister Alexander Kerensky to let her form a women's battalion. The Women's Battalion fought during the June Offensive against German forces in 1917. Three months of fighting reduced their numbers to around 250. The Women's Battalion was disbanded after a failed 1917 military coup known as the Kornilov Affair. Its leader, General Lavr Kornilov, had been strongly supported by Bochkareva.

Several women pilots are known from the First World War, one example being Sofya Alekseevna Dolgorukova. Princess Eugenie Shakovskaya was assigned duty as an artillery and reconnaissance pilot, having volunteered for the Imperial Russian Air Service in 1914 (one of the world’s first female military aviators) and flew missions with the 26th Corps Air Squadron in 1917 for nine months. Because of her connections to the Imperial family she was demobilized after the October Revolution. Lyubov A. Golanchikova was a test pilot who contributed her airplane to the Czarist armies; Helen P. Samsonova was assigned to the 5th Corps Air Squadron as a reconnaissance pilot. And in 1915, Nedeshda Degtereva had the distinction of being the first woman pilot to be wounded in combat while on a reconnaissance mission over the Austrian front in Galicia.

== World War II ==
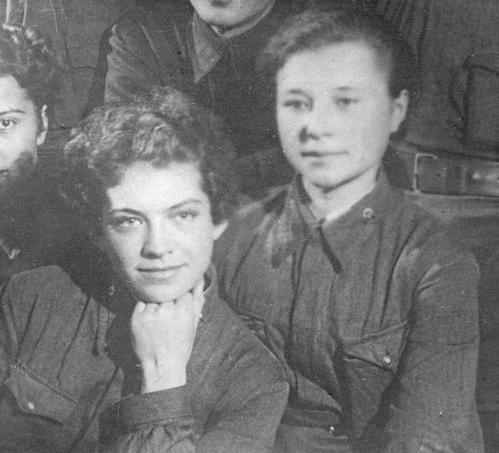
Snipers Natalya Kovshova and Mariya Polivanova became posthumous Heroines of the Soviet Union after committing suicide in battle to avoid capture by German forces.

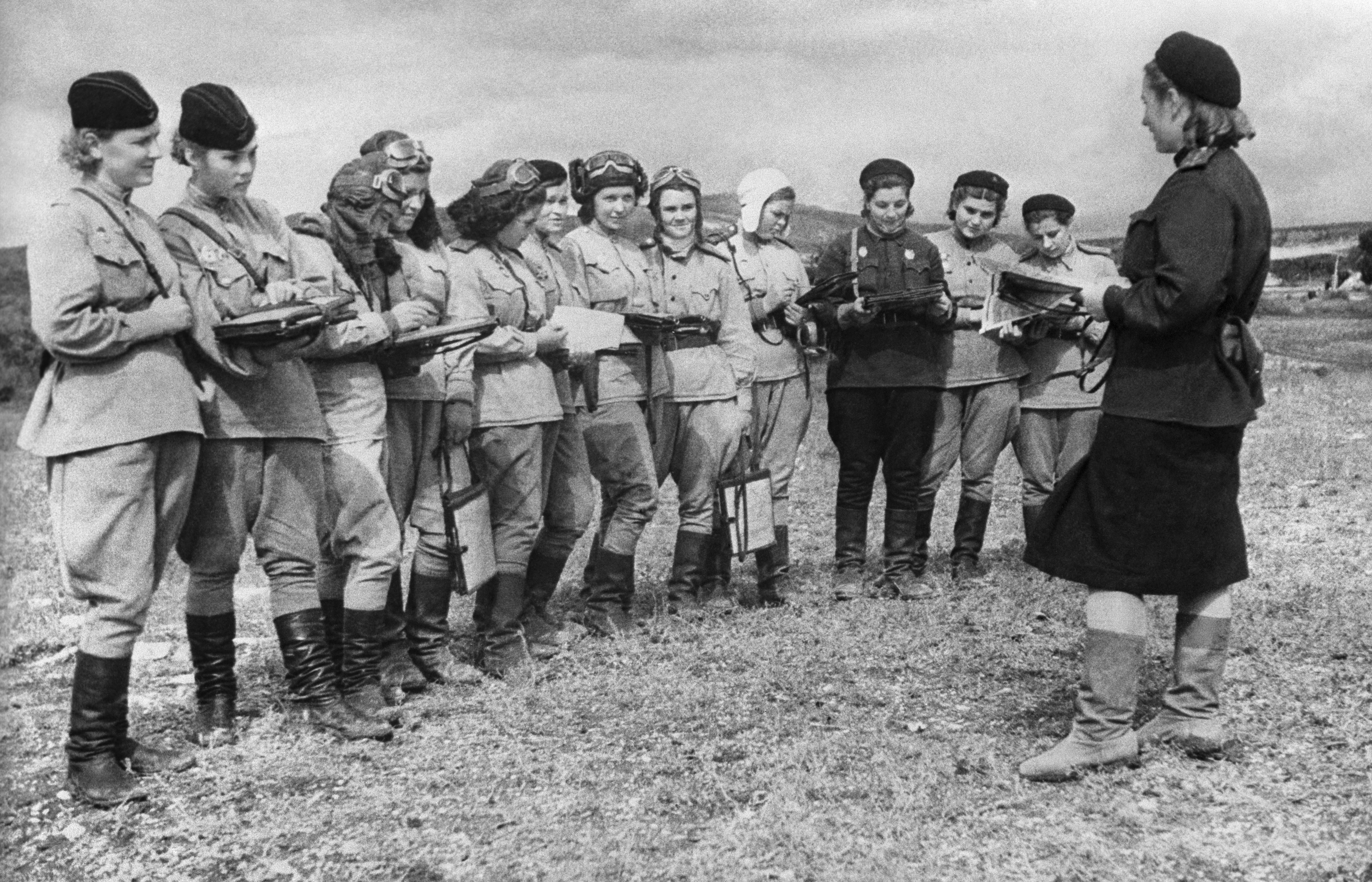
Soviet aviators of the all-female 46th Guards Night Bomber Regiment ("Night Witches"), 1943

Women played a part in most of the armed forces of the Second World War. In most countries though, women tended to serve mostly in administrative, medical and in auxiliary roles. But in the Soviet Union women fought also in front line roles. Over 800,000 women served in the Soviet armed forces in World War II, mostly as medics and nurses, which is over 3 percent of total personnel; nearly 200,000 of them were decorated. 89 of them eventually received the Soviet Union’s highest award, the Hero of the Soviet Union, they served as pilots, snipers, machine gunners, tank crew members and partisans, as well as in auxiliary roles. Few of these women, however, were promoted to officers.

=== Aviators ===
For Soviet women aviators, instrumental to this change was Marina Raskova, a famous Russian aviator. Raskova became a famous aviator as both a pilot and a navigator in the 1930s. She was the first woman to become a navigator in the Soviet Air Force in 1933. Raskova is credited with using her personal connections with Joseph Stalin to convince the military to form three combat regiments for women. The Soviet Union was the first nation to allow women pilots to fly combat missions. These regiments with strength of almost hundred airwomen, flew a combined total of more than 30,000 combat sorties, produced over twenty Heroes of the Soviet Union, and included two fighter aces. This military unit was initially called Aviation Group 122 while the three regiments received training. After their training, the three regiments received their formal designations as the 586th Fighter Aviation Regiment, the 587th Bomber Aviation Regiment, and the 588th Night Bomber Regiment.

=== Land forces ===
The Soviet Union also used women for sniping duties, and to good effect, including Nina Alexeyevna Lobkovskaya and Lyudmila Pavlichenko (who killed over 300 enemy soldiers). The Soviets found that sniper duties fit women well, since good snipers are patient, careful, deliberate, and should avoid tactical hand-to-hand combat. Women served also in non-combat roles as medics, nurses, communication personnel, political officers, as well - in small numbers - as machine gunners, snipers, and tank commanders. Manshuk Mametova was a machine gunner from Kazakhstan and was the first Asian woman to receive the title Hero of the Soviet Union after she refused to retreat with the rest of her regiment.

=== Partisans ===
Women constituted significant numbers of the Soviet partisans. One of the most famous was Zoya Kosmodemyanskaya, who was posthumously awarded the title Hero of the Soviet Union on 16 February 1942.

The youngest woman to become a Hero of the Soviet Union was also a resistance fighter, Zinaida Portnova.

== Russian Federation ==
=== Yeltsin era ===
At the end of 1992, when conscription of noncommissioned officers and enlisted personnel was converted to volunteer or contract recruitment, women were given equal rights with men to join the Russian Armed Forces. Between 1990 and 1999, the percentage of women in the armed forces grew from 3.5% to almost 10%. Similar phenomena happened in other countries around the world in the late 20th century.

Smirnov (2002) cited a September–November 1999 survey that he and colleagues conducted amongst a representative sample of 993 servicewomen, indicating that female soldiers generally had a much higher educational level than their male counterparts, their average age was about 30 and they had achieved considerable experience. However, the socioeconomic conditions for women in Russia were worsening ('women who are pushed out of paid work into unpaid housework, irregular occupation, and unemployment constitute an urgent social problem in Russia'), and thus 'seriously complicate[d] their integration into the military community'. According to the 1999 survey, 67.9% of military women were married, and they accounted for 57.1% of all servicewomen who had children (71.4%); all other female soldiers were much less likely to have children. There was also a clear link between education and parenthood: the more educated people were, the fewer children they had. Smirnov noted that divorce rates had gone up and marriage rates had gone down in the 1990s; he stated that divorced and widowed women were 'the least socially protected group', as they were often poorer and several of them even lacked housing.
53.9% of the women in the survey believed that husbands should work to support the family and wives should take care of the house; these women only entered military service due to 'material hardship', as they didn't have a husband or partner (yet/anymore), or their husbands or partners were (presumably temporarily) unable to earn enough money for the whole family. 29.2% of Russian servicewomen said 'that married women ought to work on an equal footing with their husbands.' Working enabled them to realise their own potential more fully, to acquire a certain amount of independence, earn respect from colleagues and achieve creative success that would not be possible at home, without ignoring (potential) family interests, the survey found.
8.7% of women soldiers stated that their labour rights had been violated in some way, such as being 'passed over for promotion' (33.2%), 'appointed to positions affording less monetary support' (31.6%), and 'deprived of prospects for solving the housing problem' (41%), while 57.1% weren't sure whether they had been discriminated against or not. Single mothers, married women, divorcees, and widows were far less likely to be promoted to higher positions 'because their superior officers [were] firmly convinced that family concerns would prevent them from carrying out their official duties.' Smirnov's team observed that 'women watch[ed] resentfully as men with less education [were] preferred for promotion.' Only 3,300 women (2.9%) were commissioned officers, mostly in junior positions, and usually tasked to carry out administrative duties 'that men ignore[d] for some reason', forcing servicewomen 'to be content with assignments that are not the most prestigious.'

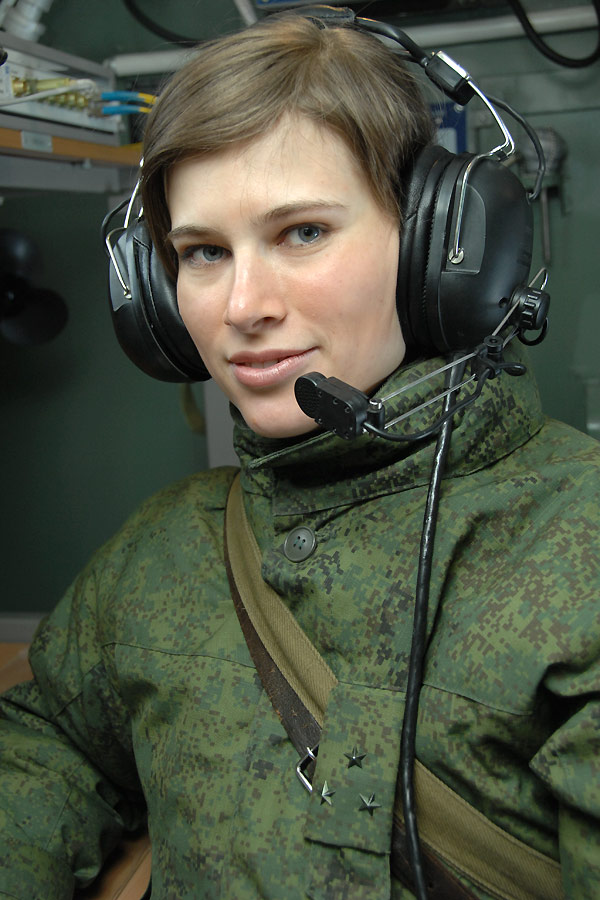
Officer of the Signal Troops

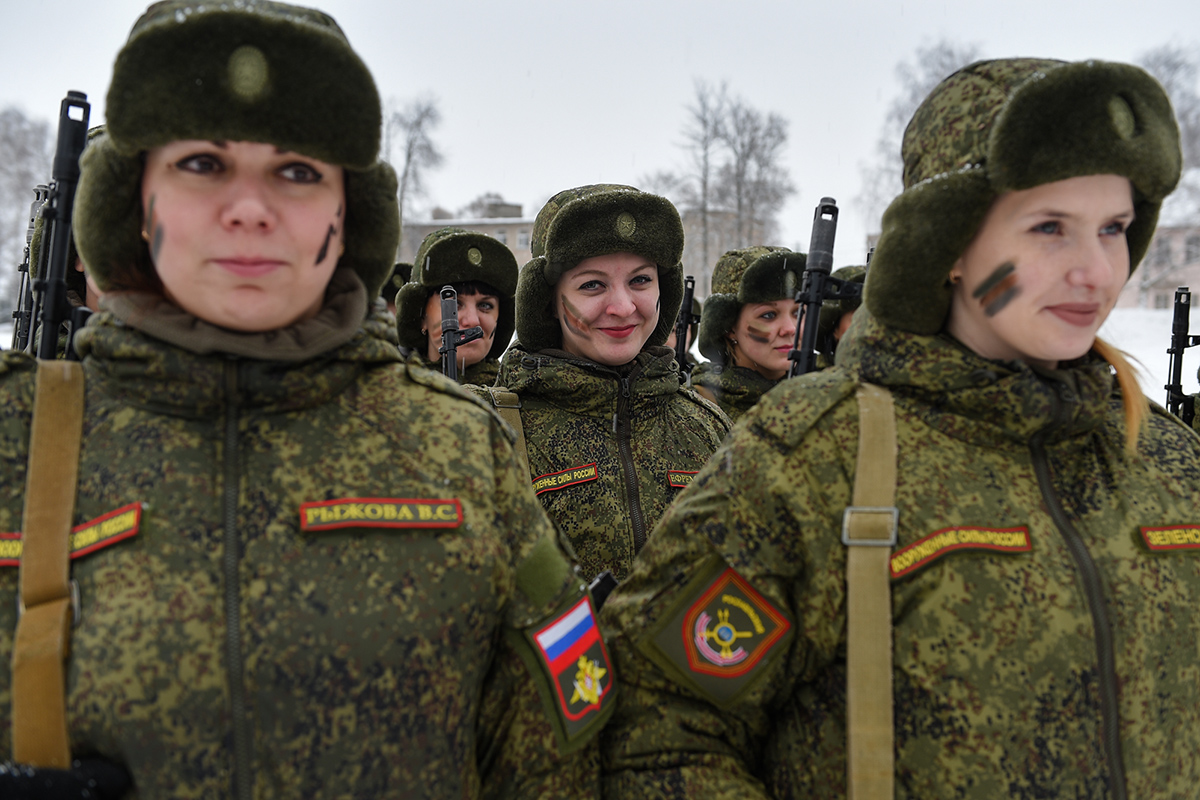
Army servicewomen

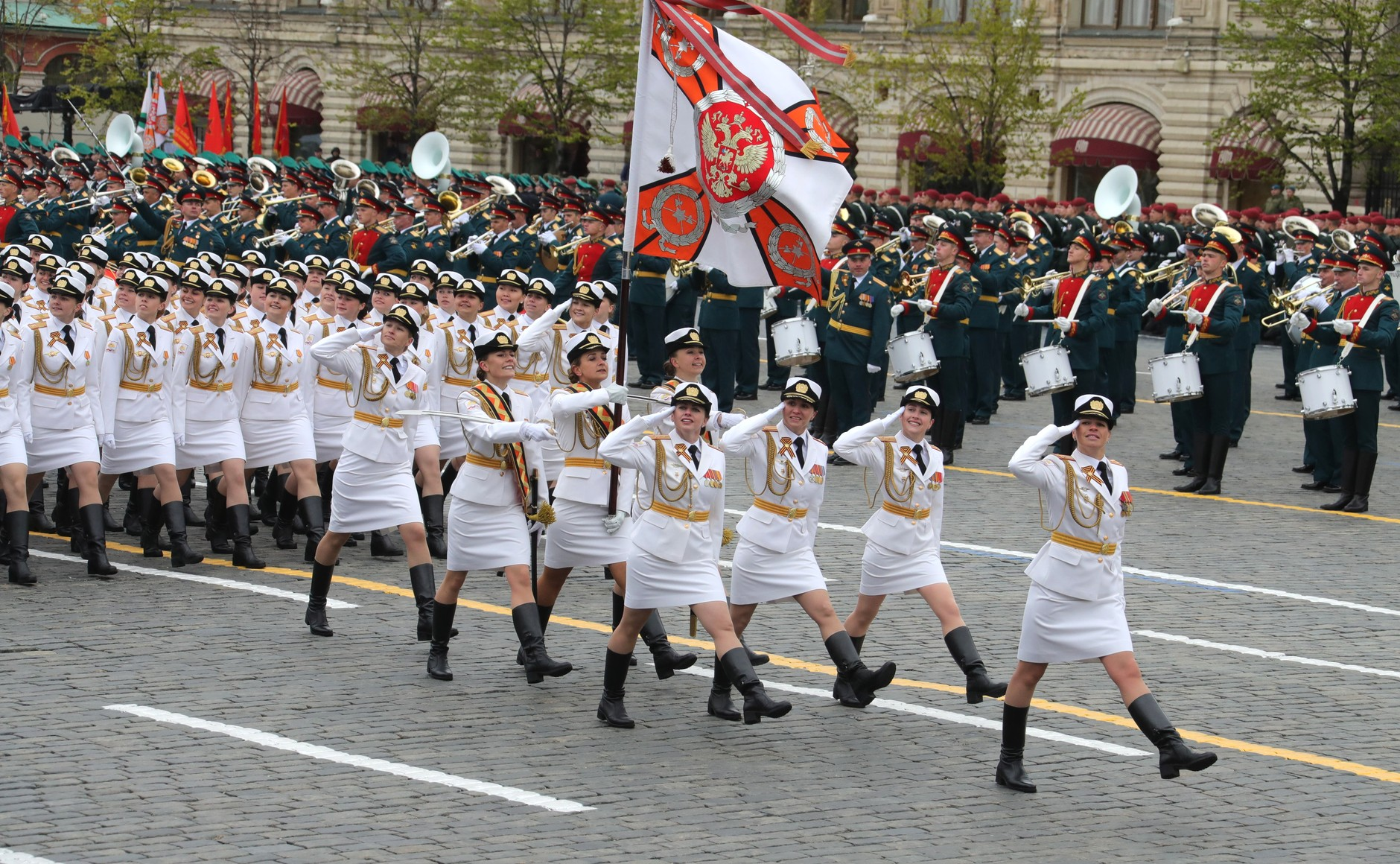
Russian female cadets.

=== Putin era ===
In 2002, 10% of the Russian armed forces (100,000 of a total active strength of 988,100) were women according to the International Institute for Strategic Studies, whereas researcher Aleksandr I. Smirnov stated that about 114,600 women had military contracts that year.

In 2013, it was reported that: "Compared to 2007, the number of female officers and warrant-officers has dropped by nearly two thirds. There were over 30,000 women serving under a contract [with the armed forces] in 2007, and now there are only slightly more than 11,000 of them, including 4,300 officers of various rank." Lt. Col. Yelena Stepanova, the chief of the social processes monitoring department at the Russian armed forces' sociological research center, said. This trend [was] "not ..special" but correspond[ed] with the general .. reduction of the Russian armed forces."

A 2016 TASS article stated: 'At the end of the 2000s, over 90,000 women were serving in the Russian Armed Forces', but that number fell to 'about 45,000' in 2011. TASS explained this drop as follows: 'After the military authorities increased their requirements for female applicants and in connection with the overall reduction in the number of service personnel in the RF Armed Forces, this number has decreased significantly.' By 2010, the motivations that servicewomen gave for working in the armed forces had also shifted markedly: 67% of women served out of financial necessity (up from 53.9% in 1999), while only 6% were focused on military service as their professional career (down from 29.2% in 1999).

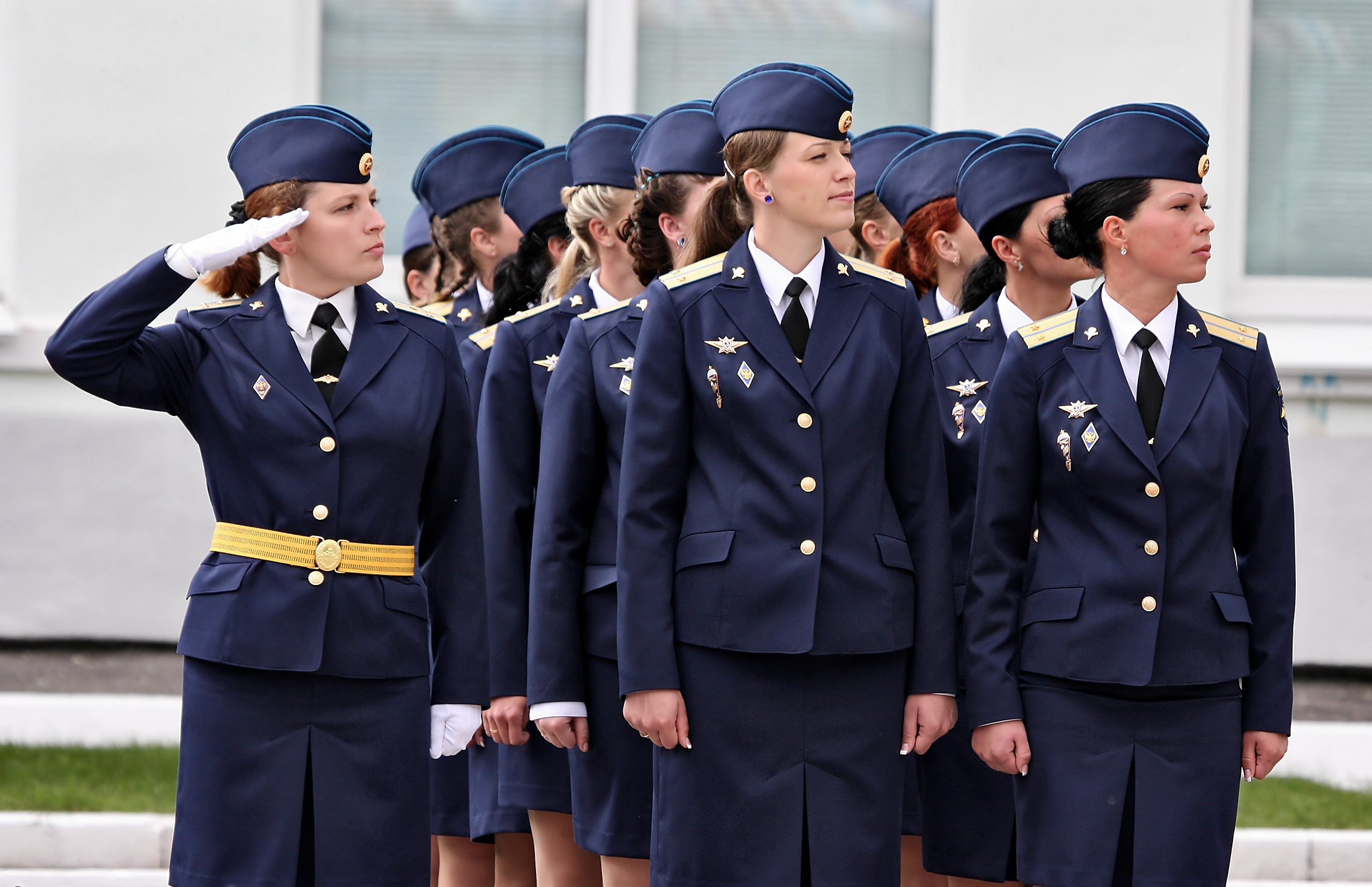
First group of female cadets of the Ryazan Guards Higher Airborne Command School receiving their diplomas in 2013

Between 2010 and 2020, the total number of women employed in the Russian military fluctuated between 35,000 and 45,000. Defence Minister Sergei Shoigu stated in May 2020 that c. 41,000 women (c. 4.26% of total active duty forces) were enlisted in the Russian Armed Forces. This percentage was relatively low compared to most Western countries (the United States military had 16.5% at the time), and also to China (c. 9% at the time). As of September 2020, conscription was only mandatory for males aged 18–27; members of the State Duma have at times suggested to include females, but such proposals were not adopted. Moreover, unlike foreign men, foreign women were not allowed to join the Russian military. Eligible female Russian citizens faced a large number of restrictions and prohibitions on the types of positions they could apply for and hold: "Russian women are not permitted in frontline combat roles and are therefore typically restricted from service on aircraft, submarines, or tanks. Though the full list is classified, women are also restricted from being mechanics and from performing sentry duties." A notable case is that of a woman named Yana Surgaeva, who was turned away by military recruiters who sent her a letter saying "the approval of military service by women as a driver, mechanic, sniper or gunner is not permitted." Surgaeva then sued the Ministry of Defence and National Guard, and went on to appeal both to the Supreme Court and the Constitutional Court, but both courts refused to hear the case.

Chesnut (2020) compared a 2019 survey showing that public opinion in the Russian Federation was simultaneously moving towards more gender equality, but "retreating" towards traditional gender roles, with a 2020 poll conducted by the state-run Russian Public Opinion Research Center (VTsIOM) showing that social attitudes amongst Russians had become less favourable towards women serving in the military. In the 2020 poll, 62% of respondents indicated that they would like to see a son of theirs to serve in the military (with 25% saying "because it is a man's job"), while 63% said they didn't want a daughter to join the army (with 42% saying "the army is not a woman's business, the army is for men").

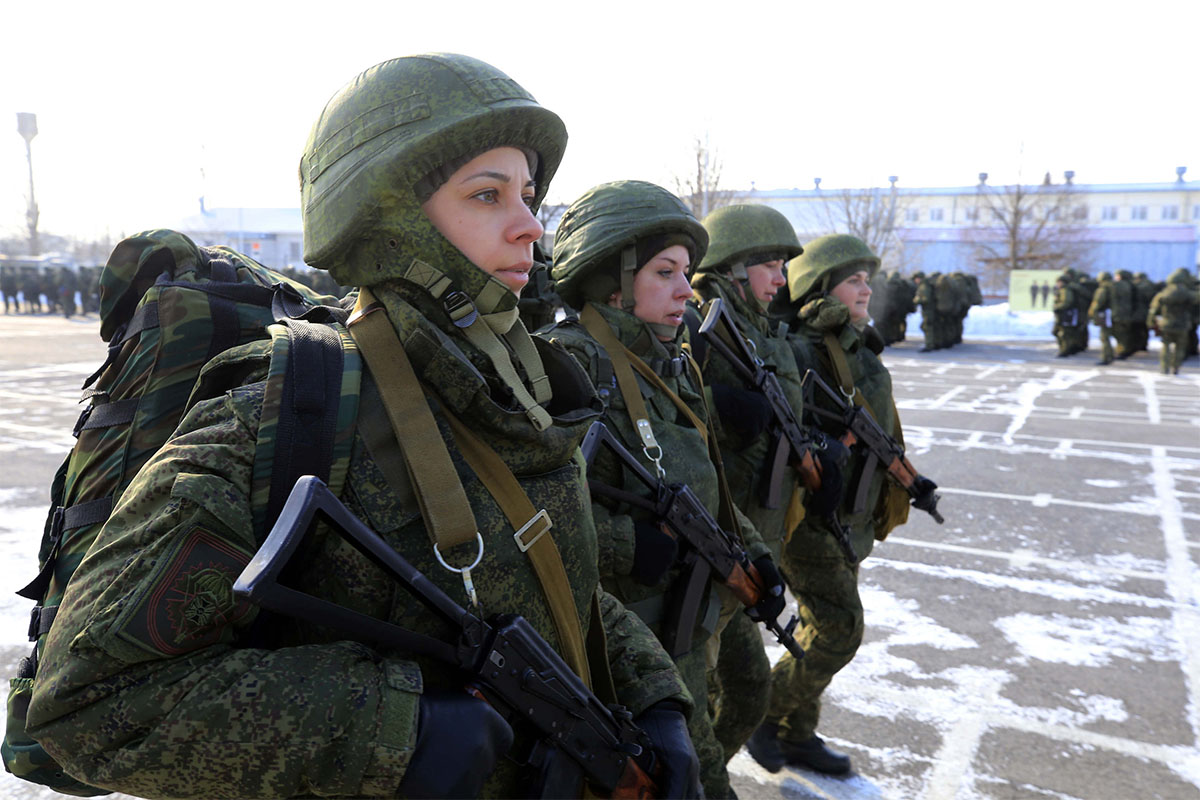
Army servicewomen

The Russian military has faced severe personnel shortages after the 2008 Russian military reform, being only manned to c. 70% in 2012. In response, the Ministry of Defence mounted an aggressive campaign against draft evasion amongst men to increase coverage levels to 90~95% by 2020, but 'made little apparent effort to enlist women' in doing so. Despite a 2014 announcement by Deputy Defence Minister Tatiana Shevtsova to enlarge the number of servicewomen in the Russian Armed Forces to 80,000 by 2020, this goal was not achieved (it was c. 41,000 in May 2020). Some observers have concluded that the government had overlooked an obvious source of manpower by ignoring the large pool of potential female soldiers.

==== Russo-Ukrainian War ====
On 12 July 2022, Russian media reported the first death of a Russian female soldier in the country's ongoing invasion of Ukraine. The soldier was Anastasia Savitskaya, a corporal from Volgograd.

In March 2023, Russian Minister of Defence Sergei Shoigu stated that there were 1100 women involved in combat with the Russian military in Ukraine.

During the Russo-Ukrainian war, Russian women served in a frontline assault units.

Russian military spouses "are posing a subtle but significant challenge to Vladimir Putin’s handling of the war in Ukraine by engaging in a form of political activism best described as ‘patriotic dissent’.

== See also ==
- Russian Armed Forces
- Soviet Armed Forces
- Soviet women in World War II
- Women in the Russian Revolution
- Women in Russia
