= Ibragim Suleymanov =

Soviet sniper (1911–1943)

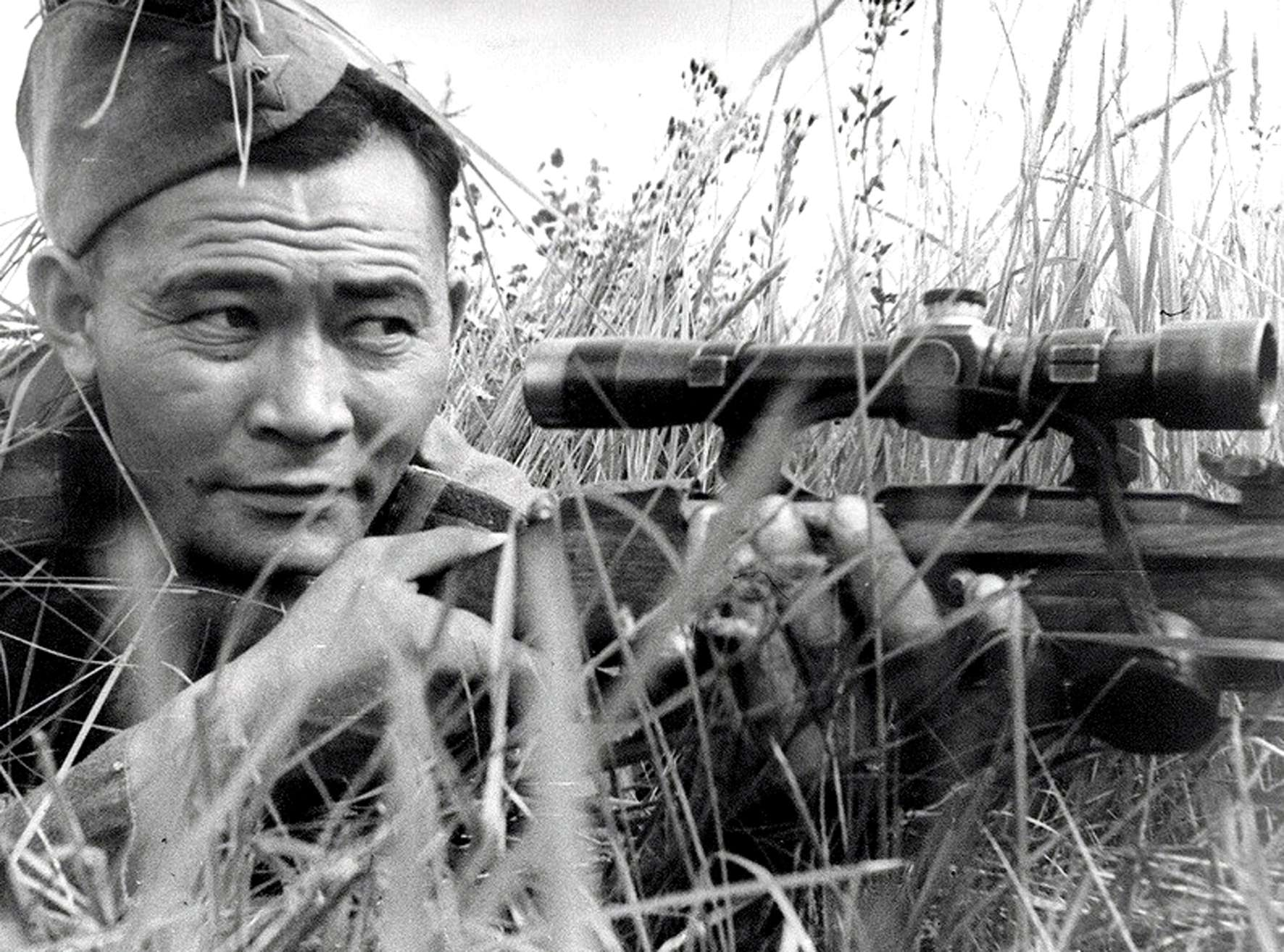
- Ibragim Suleymanov
- Born: 1911; Sarysu, Russian Turkestan, Russian Empire
- Died: 16 October 1943 (aged 31–32) Izocha station, Kalinin Oblast, Russian SFSR, Soviet Union
- Allegiance: Soviet Union
- Branch: Red Army
- Service years: 1941–1943
- Rank: Starshina
- Conflicts: World War II †
- Awards: Hero of Kazakhstan

Ibragim Suleymanov (Russian: Ибрагим Сулейманов; Kazakh: Ыбырайым Сүлейменов, romanized: Ybyraiym Süleimenov; 1911 — 16 October 1943) was a Soviet sniper in the Red Army during World War II. He killed an estimated 289 enemy soldiers. He was nominated for the title Hero of the Soviet Union on 9 July 1943, but was initially awarded only the Order of Lenin. In 2022 he was posthumously awarded the title Hero of Kazakhstan, the highest state honor of Kazakhstan.

== Early life ==
Suleymanov was born in 1911 in Sarysu village to a Tarakty Kazakh family. He worked as a tractor driver before the war and would hunt using an old Bergen rifle in his spare time. After being drafted into the military in December 1941 he was sent for marksmanship training, where he excelled.

== Combat path ==
Suleymanov served with the 100th Separate Kazakh Rifle Brigade as a regular soldier and received his baptism by fire in the city of Rzhev. In Autumn 1942 he became a sniper after an incident when he shot an enemy sniper than had fired on his battalion commander Ushakov. Several days later his commissar Rayymzhan Ashkeev gave him a special sniper rifle with the number 47 on it and told Suleymanov that since the rifle was numbered 47 he should kill 47 enemy soldiers with it, to which Suleymanov replied that 47 was not enough. He quickly increased his body count, reaching 39 kills during the battle for Rzhev, and he soon exceeded the total of 47 kills that his commissar assigned to him, totalling 160 kills by January 1943. In July 1943 he was nominated for the title Hero of the Soviet Union for killing 239 Nazi soldiers and officers. He gained fame and was celebrated in Soviet newspapers, and the Kazakh poet Jambul wrote a poem dedicated to him. During a rally of snipers that year he gave a short speech calling on other snipers to join him in killing more Nazi soldiers. On 16 October 1943 he was killed in action fighting in the same battle with Manshuk Mametova. His final tally of kills is estimated at around 290. After he was killed in battle a street in Nevelsk was named in his honor, and on 4 June 1944 he was awarded the Order of Lenin, but it was not until 2022 that he was awarded the title Hero of Kazakhstan.

== See also ==
- Tuleugali Abdybekov
- Aliya Moldagulova
