= 100th Kazakh Rifle Brigade =

- Active: 20 December 1941 - 8 December 1943
- Country: Soviet Union
- Branch: Red Army
- Type: Infantry
- Engagements: Battles of Rzhev; Battle of Velikiye Luki; Battle of Nevel

The 100th Kazakh Rifle Brigade was a military unit in the Red Army of the Soviet Union during World War II. The brigade was formed in December 1941 in Alma-Ata and was active until December 1943.

== History ==
=== Formation ===
The 100th Rifle Brigade was formed based on an order by the People's Commissariat of Defense and passed down by the Central Asian Military District on 26 November 1941. On 20 December, the brigade began to form and put together units and subunits.

At its initial formation, the ethnic composition of the brigade was 86% Kazakh, 11% Russian, and 3% other. Because it was primarily made up of Kazakhs, the brigade is usually referred to as the 100th Kazakh Rifle Brigade. On 9 August 1942, by order of the Commissariat, the brigade was transferred from the city of Alma-Ata to Babushkin near Moscow under the command of the Moscow Military District.

=== Combat record ===
On 19 October, the brigade was placed under the Commander of the Kalinin Front. At this time, its commander was Lieutenant Colonel Efin Voronkov.

On 3 November, the brigade became a part of the 39th Army. Under this command, the brigade performed several independent operations. Along with the 46th Motorized Rifle Brigade, it broke through German defenses. This breach in the German line would be where the brigade would operate until 7 December, occupying a number of settlements in the area. During this period, the brigade suffered heavy losses of upwards of 2,500 people.

The brigade was then pulled off the line on 11 December and placed in the reserve of the 22nd Army. Near the Lba River, the brigade was resupplied and reorganized. Then on 20 December, the brigade was transferred by road to the region of Velikiye Luki.

In its new deployment the brigade was under the authority of the 3rd Shock Army. On 5 January 1943, it began operations to eliminate the German enemy grouping near Velikiye Luki. During the Battle of Velikiye Luki, the brigade suffered heavy losses and Lieutenant Colonel Voronkov was killed. After this intense fighting, the brigade was placed into the reserve of the 3rd Shock Army on 12 January. In this capacity, the brigade's activity was limited to minor combat missions and combat training.

During most of the Battle of Nevel the brigade was still in reserve. However, on 15 October the brigade conducted an operation to capture the village of Bolshoi Ivan and the area of the Izocha rail station. The brigade was unsuccessful in this task and suffered heavy losses during the operation. On 19 October the brigade moved to occupy the north and northwestern parts of the city of Nevel.

=== Disbandment ===
A total of 215 members of the brigade were awarded with orders and medals for their actions over the course of the Second World War.

On 8 December 1943, the brigade was merged with the 31st Cadet Rifle Brigade and became the 1st Rifle Division. Subsequently, the 1st Division was awarded the Order of the Red Banner and given the honorary title "Brest".

== Notable people ==
- Manshuk Mametova - machine gunner, first Kazakh woman named Hero of the Soviet Union
- Ibragim Suleymanov - sniper, Hero of Kazakhstan
