= Tuleugali Abdybekov =

Soviet sniper (1916–1944)

- Native name: Төлеуғали Насырханұлы Әбдібеков
- Born: September 1916; Zharma, Russian Empire
- Died: 23 February 1944 (aged 27) Novosokolnichesky District, Russian SFSR, Soviet Union
- Allegiance: Soviet Union
- Branch: Red Army
- Service years: 1938–1940; 1941–1944
- Rank: Starshina
- Conflicts: World War II (DOW)
- Awards: Hero of Kazakhstan

Tuleugali Nasyrkhanovich Abdybekov (Kazakh: Төлеуғали Насырханұлы Әбдібеков, romanized: Tölewğalï Nasırxanulı Äbdibekov; Russian: Тулеугали Насырханович Абдыбеков; September 1916 — 23 February 1944) was a Soviet sniper in the Red Army during World War II. He killed 395 enemy soldiers. He was posthumously awarded the title Hero of Kazakhstan in 2022.

== Before the war ==
Abdybekov was born in September 1916 to a Kazakh family in Zharma District. From his youth he hunted with his father for furs to sell, gaining valuable sharpshooting skills that would prove useful during the war. Due to the huge famine in Eastern Kazakhstan in the early 1930s he moved South to live with family, and worked on the Pakhtaaral state farm. From 1938 to 1940 he served in the military and was stationed in the Khabarovsk Krai. After being demobilized in 1940 he returned to Kazakhstan and worked on a cotton farm until being drafted into the military again on 12 December 1941.

== Combat path ==
Abdybekov arrived on the Kalinin Front in May 1942 as a soldier in the 30th Guards Rifle Regiment of the 8th Guards Rifle Division. He quickly stood out as one of the best sharpshooters, but it was not until September that be formally became a sniper. He soon became famous for his skill as a sniper not only among his regiment but throughout the army. Articles about him were published in central newspapers including Komsomolskaya Pravda and Pravda. For killing 227 enemy soldiers he was nominated for the Order of Lenin on 4 December 1942, but he was only awarded the Order of the Red Star, a much lower award. On 14 March 1943 he was again nominated for the Order of Lenin, having killed 255 enemy soldiers by that time, but he was awarded only the Order of the Red Banner. Nevertheless, Abdybekov continued to rack up kills of enemy soldiers and trained other snipers. However, on 22 February 1944 he was mortally wounded in a duel with another sniper, and died of the wounds the next day. In total he killed at least 395 (some sources say 397) enemy soldiers and officers. He was nominated for the title Hero of the Soviet Union on 21 March 1944 but was awarded only the Order of the Patriotic War 1st class, despite the fact that he was one of the top 20 best snipers of the Red Army during the war. On 6 May 2022 he was posthumously awarded the title Hero of Kazakhstan and the Order of Otan.

== Awards ==
- Hero of Kazakhstan (6 May 2022)
- Order of Otan (6 May 2022)
- Order of the Red Banner (22 May 1943)
- Order of the Patriotic War 1st class (18 June 1944)
- Order of the Red Star (20 December 1942)

== See also ==
- Aliya Moldagulova
- Ibragim Suleymanov
