= Stroyevskoye =

Stroyevskoye Строевское
- Selo
- Location within Arkhangelsk Oblast Location within Russia
- Coordinates: 61°24′N 43°42′E
- Country: Russia
- Region: Arkhangelsk Oblast
- District: Ustyansky District
- Time zone: UTC+3:00

Stroyevskoye (Russian: Строевское) is a rural locality (a selo) in Ustyansky District, Arkhangelsk Oblast, Russia. The population was 547 as of 2010. There are 18 streets.

== Geography ==
It is located on the Ustya River.
