= 1st Rifle Division (Soviet Union) =

- Active: 1924 (or 1927) – 1940; 1942; 1943–1945
- Country: Soviet Union
- Branch: Red Army
- Type: Infantry
- Size: Division
- Engagements: World War II; Operation Little Saturn; Dnieper–Carpathian offensive; Lublin–Brest offensive; East Prussian offensive; East Pomeranian offensive; Battle of Berlin
- Decorations: Order of the Red Banner (4th formation)
- Battle honours: Brest (4th formation)

Commanders
- Notable commanders: Grigory Kulik

The 1st Rifle Division was an infantry division of the Soviet Union's Red Army. It is unclear when the division was first established, some sources indicate 1918, others indicate 1924 or 1927. The division was formed from units already stationed in Moscow as the 1st Moscow Rifle Division. It became a motorized unit in 1940.

== First formation ==
The division was initially placed on "cadre" status, but in 1932 it was upgraded to a "shock" division and tank and motorized elements were added. In August 1939, as the Soviet Union began to mobilize and expand the army, the division was broken up to provide cadres for two new divisions. The 2nd Rifle Regiment was used to form the 115th Rifle Division and the 3rd Rifle Regiment was used to form the 126th Rifle Division. The 1st Rifle Regiment was then used to form new 1st Rifle Division.

=== Subordinate units ===
- 1st Rifle Regiment
- 2nd Rifle Regiment
- 3rd Rifle Regiment
- 1st Artillery Regiment

== Second formation ==
The second formation (formirovaniye) of the division was formed from the remaining cadre of the division. The division was assigned as the garrison for the city of Moscow. In December 1939 the division was ordered to convert to a motorized division and in January 1940 was redesignated the 1st Motorized Division, which later became the 1st Guards Motor Rifle Division.

=== Subordinate Units ===
- 6th Rifle Regiment
- 176th Rifle Regiment
- 375th Rifle Regiment
- 13th Artillery Regiment

== Third formation ==
It was re-formed for the third time on 13 March 1942 at Kuibyshev (though a second source, probably Poirer and Connor, says June 1942 was also a possibility). After completion of training the division was transferred to the 5th Reserve Army. Assigned to the 63rd Army from August to November 1942, and fought at Stalingrad. It became the 58th Guards Rifle Division on 31 December 1942.

=== Subordinate units ===
Units were awarded their Guards designation on 27 February 1943

- 408th Rifle Regiment (I) becomes 173rd Guards Rifle Regiment
- 412th Rifle Regiment (I) becomes 175th Guards Rifle Regiment
- 415th Rifle Regiment (I) becomes 178th Guards Rifle Regiment
- 1026th Artillery Regiment becomes 130th Guards Artillery Regiment
- 339th Separate Antitank Artillery Battalion becomes 66th Guards Sep. Anti-Tank Artillery Battalion
- 1st Reconnaissance Company becomes 61st Guards Reconnaissance Company
- 55th Sapper Battalion becomes 69th Guards Sapper Battalion
- 332nd Separate Signals Battalion becomes 87th Guards Separate Signal Battalion
- 81st Medical Battalion becomes 348th Medical Battalion
- 24th Decontamination Company becomes 62nd Guards Decontamination Company
- 525th Auto-Transport Company becomes 349th Auto-Transport Company
- 369th Field Bakery becomes 238th Field Bakery
- 745th Veterinary Field Hospital becomes 348th Veterinary Field Hospital
- 1825th Field Postal Station no change
- 1148th Field Cash Office of the State Bank no change

== Fourth formation ==
The division was re-formed for the fourth time in December 1943 or January 1944, at Nevel in the rear areas of 6th Guards Army. The 31st and 100th Rifle Brigades provided the basis for the new formation. It was transferred to 70th Army, 2nd Belorussian Front, and with that Army took Brest, Belarus, winning the title 'Brest'. It later advanced into Poland, fighting at Gdynia. It became part of the Group of Soviet Forces in Germany briefly, but with the rest of 70th Army and 114th Rifle Corps moved to the South Urals region and was disbanded on 24 July 1945.

However, the division appears to have been disbanded in the summer of 1945 in accordance with Stavka Directive No. 11095, which directed the formation of the Group of Soviet Forces in Germany.

=== Subordinate units ===
- 408th Rifle Regiment (II)
- 412th Rifle Regiment (II)
- 415th Rifle Regiment (II)
- 226th Artillery Regiment
- 339th Separate Antitank Artillery Battalion
- 1st Reconnaissance Company
- 55th Sapper Battalion
- 30th Separate Signals Battalion (formally the 306th Sep. Signals Company)
- 81st Medical Battalion (formally the 79th Medical Battalion)
- 24th Decontamination Company
- 525th Auto-Transport Company
- 369th Field Bakery
- 745th Veterinary Field Hospital
- 1644th Field Postal Station
- 1634th Field Cash Office of the State Bank

== Sources ==
- Craig Crofoot, Armies of the Bear, Volume I Part 1
- Feskov, V.I.; Golikov, V.I.; Kalashnikov, K.A.; Slugin, S.A. (2013). Вооруженные силы СССР после Второй Мировой войны: от Красной Армии к Советской [The Armed Forces of the USSR after World War II: From the Red Army to the Soviet: Part 1 Land Forces] (in Russian). Tomsk: Scientific and Technical Literature Publishing. ISBN 9785895035306.
- Robert Poirer, Albert Conner, Red Army Order of Battle in the Great Patriotic War, Presidio Press, 1985
- Agentstvo Voyennykh Novostey, 5 November 2001
