= Encyclopédie Du Monde Actuel =

La psychanalyse, published by Livre de Poche, 1975

Encyclopédie Du Monde Actuel (The Encyclopedia of the Current World –EDMA) is a French language encyclopedia which was published in Lausanne, Switzerland between 1964 and 1971. The project was initiated by Charles-Henri Favrod and André Fougerousse.

The primary unit of the encyclopedia were "EDMA cards" each of which contained about 500 words. These were later published by Editions Rencontre as monthly booklets each containing about 30 illustrated pages.

In 1975 the project was bought by the French publisher Hachette. Their subsidiary, Livre de Poche, then published the material in the more conventional form of a series of books.
