= Aliya Moldagulova =

Soviet sniper (1925–1944)

- Әлия Нұрмұхамедқызы Молдағұлова
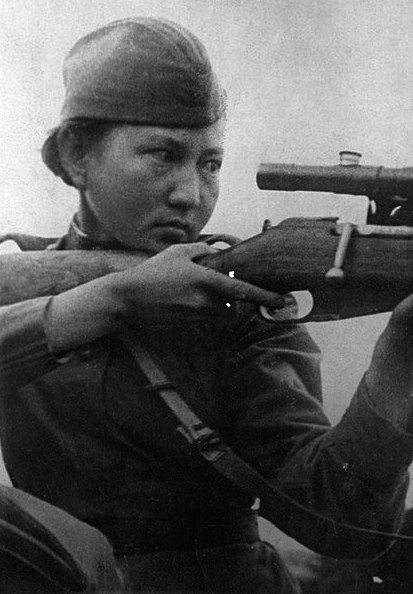
- Born: 25 October 1925; Bulak, Kazakh ASSR, Russian SFSR, Soviet Union
- Died: 14 January 1944 (aged 18); Novosokolniki, Russian SFSR, Soviet Union
- Burial place: Monakovo, Pskov
- Military career
- Allegiance: Soviet Union
- Branch: Red Army
- Service years: 1942–1944
- Rank: Corporal
- Unit: 54th Independent Rifle Brigade
- Conflicts: World War II †
- Awards: Hero of the Soviet Union

Aliya Nurmukhambetovna Moldagulova (Russian: Алия Нурмухамбетовна Молдагулова; Kazakh: Әлия Нұрмұхамедқызы Молдағұлова, romanized: Äliia Nūrmūhamedqyzy Moldağūlova; 25 October 1925 – 14 January 1944) was a Soviet sniper in the Red Army during World War II who killed over 30 Nazi soldiers. After dying of wounds sustained in battle on 14 January 1944, she was posthumously awarded the title Hero of the Soviet Union.

== Childhood ==
Moldagulova was born on 25 October 1925 in Bulak village (now in the Khobdinsky district of the Aktobe region, Kazakh ASSR) to Nurmukhamet Sarkulov and his wife Marzhan. She had at least one sibling, a younger brother called Bagdat.

During the Soviet famine of 1930–1933, her mother Marzhan collected the remains of potatoes. In 1933, Marzhan was shot and killed by a watchman. Shortly afterward, Bagdat died when he was about two years old.

Moldagulova's father was being persecuted by the Soviet authorities as a descendant of noblemen. He hastily buried his wife somewhere in the lower reaches of the Kuraili River, where his family lived at that time. After the death of her mother, she wandered around the village for a whole year until her uncle, Aubakir Moldagulov, took her to Alma-Ata to be raised by her grandmother.

For a short time, Moldagulova studied at 11th school in the town of Aulie-Ata. At a young age, she was distinguished by a purposeful and firm character.

In 1935, her uncle was admitted to the Military Transport Academy. The entire Moldagulov family moved to Moscow. A few years later, they moved to Leningrad, as the Academy transferred there. There were eight members of the family in one room: Moldagulov, his wife, their three children, an aunt, two grandmothers and the young Moldagulova. In the fall of 1939, Moldagulov arranged for 14-year-old Moldagulova to study at boarding school No. 46 as he wanted her to be educated. In 1942–43, the boarding school became an orphanage.

== Beginning of war ==
Immediately after the attack on the USSR, the military registration and enlistment offices of the republics of Central Asia and Kazakhstan received a flood of applications from volunteers wishing to go to the front where both women and men were equally willing to defend their homelands. In Kazakhstan, women who applied for sending to the front accounted for 40% of the total volunteers. Many thousands of women and girls decided to master the specialty of nurses ahead of schedule. At their request, in the first two months of the war, 206 nursing courses and 248 sanitary groups were created. About 200 thousand women and girls were engaged in those initiatives.

During the Great Patriotic War, women of the Soviet Union took a massive and active part in the armed defense of their homeland. Many names of the women, seen as heroes of Central Asia and Kazakhstan, are captured in historical and fictional literature.

During the war, more than 1,200,000 Kazakh soldiers were drafted into the ranks of the Soviet army, and more than 20 rifle divisions and other formations were formed. A total of 601,939 people died on the war fronts, which is 12% of the total population of the then Kazakh people.

In June 1941, with the outbreak of World War II, the family of Moldagulova's uncle was evacuated. However, young Moldagulova chose to stay on in Leningrad. When the war broke out, Abubakir Moldagulov sent two telegrams from Tashkent, where he was practicing, to Leningrad. One family - to be urgently evacuated, the second - to a family friend, a certain Aleksey, with a request to help his family leave for Kazakhstan and in no case leave Moldagulova behind. However, Moldagulova did not agree to go to Kazakhstan. Despite the persuasions of family members, she stayed and explained this by the fact that she would defend the Motherland to the end, says Sapar Mogdagulov.

On 8 September 1941, the blockade of Leningrad began. In the memoirs of the former pioneer leader of the orphanage:

At one time, Leah (due to the difficulty of pronunciation, her Russian alternative name is used), having gone with a sled to fetch water, did not return for a long time. She was found lying unconscious in the middle of the street. When the doctor examined Leah, it turned out that she was exhausted to the limit. We barely left. As it turned out later, Leah gave half of her meager bread ration to a small girl, with poor health, Katya. As soon as she got on her feet, she climbed to the roof and together with the others began to put out lighter bombs.

According to the memoirs of the sniper school cadet E.F. Loginova, Moldagulova "studied well," and was "very sincere, attentive."

== Military career ==
In March 1942, together with the orphanage, Moldagulova left the besieged Leningrad for the village of Vyatskoye, Yaroslavl Region. On 1 October 1942, after graduating from the 7th grade of the Vyatka secondary school, she entered the Rybinsk Aviation Technical School. She wanted to become a pilot, but she got into a training group specializing in "cold metalworking". Three months later, Moldagulova applied to the Red Army with a request to send her to the front. On 21 December 1942, she was expelled from the technical school due to leaving to the front.

On 20 March 1942, by order of the People's Commissariat of Defense of the Soviet Union, a school of sniper instructors was created under the Main Directorate of Vsevobuch. On November 27 of the same year, it reorganized into the Central Women's Sniper Training School. Moldagulova was included in the first enrollment of this school, which was located in the village of Veshnyaki, near Moscow, on the territory where the Moscow Humanitarian University is now located (Yunosti Street, 5). Classes were held in this building, and the barracks where the cadets lived were set up on the territory of the former estate of the Sheremetevs in Kuskovo.

From the memoirs of N. A. Matveeva, then a student of a sniper school: "On 17 December 1942, I first met Aliya at the Rybinsk City Executive Committee. At that time she looked like a very young teenage girl, she was 17 years old. But Aliya persistently sought to volunteer for the front ... Upon arrival at the school, they underwent a medical examination. Leah and I (I called her that) were enrolled in the fourth company by their height - the smallest. Placed in a greenhouse with three-tiered bunks. Leah and I slept next to each other. It was cold, there was nowhere to dry clothes, soldier's footcloths, shoes. Then our fourth company transferred to a capital barrack, conditions improved. After that, studies began at a sniper school. They learned to shoot accurately, to crawl on their bellies, to be invisible to the enemy. In her studies, Aliya showed perseverance, perseverance in mastering the sniper business ". In the sniper school, Moldagulova was awarded a personalized rifle with the inscription "From the Central Committee of the Komsomol for excellent shooting".

On 23 February 1943, Moldagulova's group of cadets took the military oath. In July 1943, she and the rest of the group were subsequently assigned to the 54th rifle brigade of the 22nd Army. According to the recollections of one of her fellow soldiers Ya. K. Prokopenkova: "In August 1943, a sniper Aliya Moldagulova arrived in our brigade. A fragile and pretty girl from Kazakhstan. She was only 18 years old, but by October the sniper girl had 32 killed fascists on her account ". According to the memoirs of N. A. Matveeva: "Here she had to shed a lot of tears before getting to the front line. The reason for this was again her age and height. Leah and I were assigned to one platoon of the 4th battalion. We, snipers, went on missions in pairs, we had positions prepared in advance. We stayed there until they took the Fritz on the fly and let them flow. Then enemy shells and mines fell on us! Leah at such moments showed exceptional fearlessness. She did not only beat the fascists but also carried the wounded comrades from the battlefield and performed them first aid. "

On December 3, 1943, she wrote to her relatives:

"Now we are at the forefront. I am writing the letter in a deep trench, there are many trees around. We meet the Germans face to face. I have a helmet on my head, a grenade in my belt, a rifle in my hands ... I don't feel pity for Nazis, but at first I was a little worried ... In the morning, on the line, our commander called me three steps forward. He said: sniper Liya Magdagulova killed 14 fascists in three days. For this feat on behalf of the command, I declare gratitude ... Then in front of others he kissed me like a son, I even blushed. Goodbye. Let's meet with victory. Kiss. Leah "(this letter is kept in the Central State Archives of the Republic of Kazakhstan).

== Death ==
The commander of the fourth battalion was Major Moiseev, political instructor – G.V. Varshavsky, recalls Moldagulova's last battles: in early January we marched along the front towards Novosokolniki. Having broken through the enemy's defenses, our brigade rushed forward north of the town of Novosokolniki. We went to the railway track at the Nasva station. The enemy met us with heavy fire. At night we occupied the starting lines for the attack. At dawn, the offensive began. The battalion, along with which the snipers were walking, was supposed to cut the Novosokolniki-Dno railway in the area of the Nasva station and capture the village of Kazachikha. The first line of defense was successfully broken through. But soon the enemy unleashed a fierce return fire, and our infantrymen lay down. The attack drowned. At this critical moment, Aliya Moldagulova stood up to her full height and shouted: "Brothers soldiers, follow me!" And at the call of the girl, the fighters rose ... Moldagulova three more times that day participated in repelling the enemy's counterattacks. The offensive of our troops continued.

During one of the attacks, Moldagulova, being wounded in the arm by a mine fragment, nevertheless participated in hand-to-hand combat, which began in a German trench. During the battle, she was wounded again by a German officer. She managed to kill him, but her wound was fatal. The day before the operation, Moldagulova managed to write a letter to her sister Sapura. She was buried, as it was then reported, in the village of Monakovo, Novosokolnichesky district.

In the battle of Pskov, Moldagulova contributed to the successful offensive charge of the battalion. At the age of 18, Moldagulova died in hand-to-hand combat on January 14, 1944, near the village of Kazachikha, Novosokolniki district. On June 4, 1944, she was posthumously awarded the title of Hero Soviet Union. She was also awarded the Order of Lenin.

=== Military reports of battle at Pskov ===
According to military reports, the last battle that Moldagulova was engaged in is described as follows:

"During the Leningrad-Novgorod operation in early January 1944, the 54th rifle brigade marched along the front to the city of Novosokolniki (Pskov region), where it broke through the enemy's defenses and advanced north of the city. G.V. Varshavsky, political instructor of the 4th battalion, where the sniper Aliya Moldagulov served, parts of the brigade reached the railway at the Nasva station, where they were met with strong enemy fire. Having occupied the starting lines at night, the Red Army attacked at dawn on January 14, 1944. The battalion, whose actions were covered by snipers, was tasked with cutting the Novosokolniki-Dno railway in the area of Nasva station and seizing the village of Kazachikha. Even though the first line of defense had already been successfully broken through, the attack was drowned out by the strong return fire of the enemy."

The winters were cold at that time. According to the recollections of Moldagulova's front-line friends, frosts reached - 47 degrees (°C) and everyone lay in the trenches. Moldagulova was not at a loss and took everyone to the village of Kazachikha, near the town of Novosokolniki in the Kalinin (Tver) region where Soviet soldiers fought the Nazis already in hand-to-hand combat. Suddenly, a German officer appeared from around the corner and fired at Moldagulova. Falling, she managed to return fire. This is the official storyline from Soviet times. According to official figures, Moldagulova killed 78 fascists. However, Kazakh museum workers are more inclined towards the version that places this number at over one hundred.

Moldagulova died from a gunshot wound later that day after writing a letter to her sister and was buried in a mass grave in Monakovo, Pskov. On 4 June 1944, she was posthumously awarded the title Hero of the Soviet Union.

Estimates of Moldagulova's final sniper tally vary; Henry Sakaida credits her with 91 kills, while Andrey Simonov, Svetlana Chudinova, her nomination sheet for the title Hero of the Soviet Union, and other estimates indicate a tally in the 30's.

== After her death ==
The command of the unit where Moldagulova served wrote to the Central Committee of the Communist Party of Kazakhstan: "To you, dear comrades, on behalf of the unit command, thank you for such ardent patriots as Aliya Moldagulova was. Her name is immortal and belongs to the great people of the Union of Soviets. We would like to ask a favor: tell the Kazakh people about her exploits and selfless devotion to our Motherland. "

The commander, Lieutenant Colonel Andrei Efimov, wrote a letter to the sniper school, from which Moldagulova graduated with honors. This document is kept in the heroine's museum in Aktobe. The text of the letter was published in the newspaper "Lenin Youth" on May 9, 1969, No. 91.

"Liya Moldagulova, the daughter of the Kazakh people, came to our department after leaving school. From October to the end of December 1943, our unit was on the defensive. Liya worked tirelessly to destroy the Germans. She killed 32 Nazis in a short period. In January, our unit was We were tasked with breaking through the enemy's strong defenses. On January 11, 1944, Leah's infantry battalion broke through the enemy's defenses. Leah was on the front line with her sniper rifle. At the beginning of the attack, the enemy fired artillery, mortars, and machine guns and tried to stop our soldiers. the moment the heroine of the Kazakh people Leah shouted: "Forward! For the Motherland! "The battalion entered the enemy's trenches. Leah fired a rifle and threw grenades, killing 10 enemy soldiers and one officer. Unable to withstand the onslaught of the battalion, the enemy was defeated, and the survivors fled from the fortress. The enemy attacked three times to recapture the lost line. When they formed a line and attacked the crowd, Leah took a submachine gun and opened fire, killing 28 German soldiers and officers. But they managed to get to our trench. A hand-to-hand battle began. The heroine shot eight enemy soldiers. But Leah did not notice the German officer who got close to He wounded Leah. But she could not escape. Gathering her last strength, Leah pointed her machine gun at the officer, pulled the trigger. This was the last German killed by her," the letter says.

== Search for the remains in 2013 ==
In 2013, local historians in Pskov stated that the grave long believed to be the burial place of the young female sniper was empty, and that, according to their version, the remains of Aliya Moldagulova were actually interred in a mass grave in the Pskov forests. In March 2013, when Aliya Moldagulova’s grave was opened, it was confirmed that none of her remains were present. Search teams were organized to carry out excavations in the Novosokolniki District, three hundred meters from the village of Pichyovka, where she was presumably buried in January 1944. During this work, approximately 173 remains of Soviet soldiers were discovered and reburied, including the remains of three women. The remains of one of them were given to Aliya Moldagulova’s cousin for genetic testing, and, according to statements by Kazakh geneticists, the remains found in the Pskov region do not belong to Aliya Moldagulova.

== Legacy ==
- Soviet people sacredly honored Moldagulova's memory: in Aktyubinsk, there is a street named after her, in the center of the city there is a monument to the faithful daughter of the Kazakh people. One of the schools in Leningrad bears her name.
- On 9 May 1995, as a part of 50th anniversary of end of World War II, Kazakhstan issued a stamp in her honor.
- In 1997 a monument was erected in her name in Astana Square in Almaty.
- Streets in St. Petersburg, Moscow, and other cities are named after her.
- The "Aliya" Regional Center of Patriotic Education in Aliya village, Bulaksky rural district, Aktobe
- On 28 April 2021 Aqtobe airport was officially renamed to Aliya Moldagulova International Airport in order to commemorate Aliya Moldagulova.
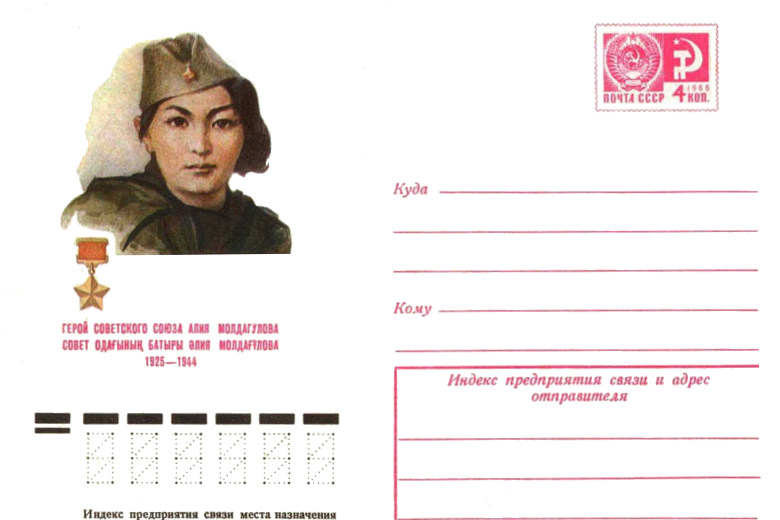
1975 Soviet envelope featuring Moldagulova

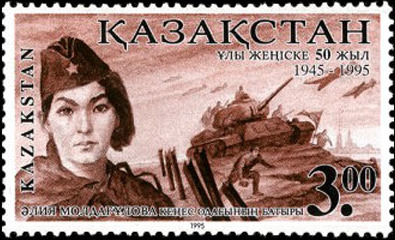
1995 Kazakh stamp featuring Moldagulova

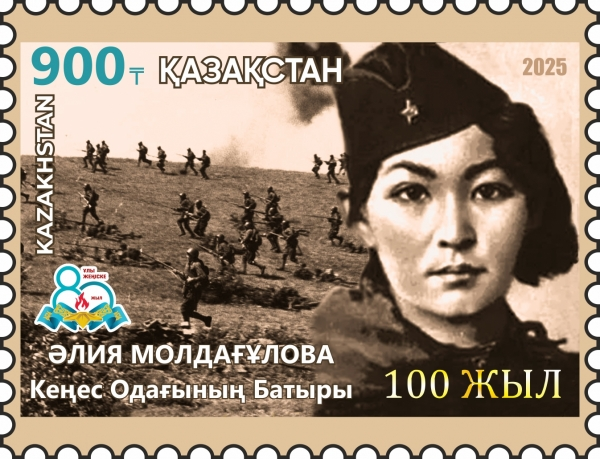
2025 Kazakh stamp dedicated to the 100 years to Moldagulova

== See also ==
- List of female Heroes of the Soviet Union
- Lyudmila Pavlichenko
- Tatyana Kostyrina
- Ziba Ganiyeva
- Manshuk Mametova
- Khiuaz Dospanova
- Tuleugali Abdybekov
- Ibragim Suleymanov
