= Monakovo =

Monakovo Монаково
- Selo
- Location within Belgorod Oblast Location within Russia
- Coordinates: 51°09′N 37°47′E
- Country: Russia
- Region: Belgorod Oblast
- District: Starooskolsky District
- Time zone: UTC+3:00

Monakovo (Russian: Монаково) is a rural locality (a selo) in Starooskolsky District, Belgorod Oblast, Russia. The population was 1,098 as of 2010. There are 12 streets.

== Geography ==
Monakovo is located 25 km southwest of Stary Oskol (the district's administrative centre) by road. Dolgaya Polyana is the nearest rural locality.
