= Tatyana Kostyrina =

Soviet Union sniper in the Red Army during WWII

Tatyana Ignatovna Kostyrina
- Татьяна Игнатовна Костырина
- Born: 18 July 1924; Kropotkin, Krasnodar Krai, Soviet Union
- Died: 10 November 1943 (aged 19); Kerch, Crimean ASSR, RSFSR, USSR
- Military career
- Allegiance: Soviet Union
- Branch: Red Army
- Service years: 1942–1943
- Rank: Junior Sergeant
- Unit: 691st Rifle Regiment
- Conflicts: World War II †
- Awards: Hero of the Soviet Union

Tatyana Ignatovna Kostyrina (Russian: Татьяна Игнатовна Костырина; 18 July 1924 – 22 November 1943) was a sniper in the Red Army during World War II and one of the top women snipers in history. After her death in combat she was posthumously awarded the title Hero of the Soviet Union on 16 May 1944.

== Early life ==
Kostyrina was born on 18 July 1924 to a Russian peasant family on a farm in Krasnodar. After her family moved to Kropotkin city in 1932, she went on to complete her seventh grade of school in 1939 and get a job at a canteen in a railway depot before the war.

== World War II ==
After the German invasion of the Soviet Union, Kostyrina attended sharpshooting training under Osoaviakhim in hopes of being accepted into the Red Army. When German forces advanced towards Kropotkin in August 1942, she enlisted in the army and was deployed as part of the 691st Infantry Regiment.

From her first days on the warfront she took part in the defense of the areas on the coast of the Black Sea with the rest of the 18th Army, and later her unit was incorporated into the 47th Army for the Novorossiysk offensive. With the 383rd division deployed to breach the Blue Line on the Taman peninsula in May, the prolonged battle that ensued lasted for several months; after breaking through the blue line in September they went on to reach the shoreline in early October, and soon thereafter German troops were completely expelled from the area.

However, during the battle for the peninsula Kostyrina was wounded in combat twice, and had to be hospitalized for a while due to her injuries. Eventually she recovered and went on to participate in additional landing operations, going through a special training program for amphibious landing operations that conducted drills on how to board ships and overcome the strong coastal defenses the Germans had put in place.

On 8 November 1943 she was deployed with her regiment to land on the Chushka Spit, where they eventually made their way to Opasnoe, Kerch, advancing into Crimea. The next day she was the first to launch an attack in the battle for hill 104.3, and soon they captured the hill. On 10 November she repeated the feat in the battle for the village of Adzhi-Mushkay, taking out 15 enemy soldiers and ordering fellow soldiers to keep fighting with her, continuing to fight despite her wounds until she was killed by an enemy sniper.

Throughout the war she fought in various battles as well as amphibious landings including the Armavir-Maykop, Tuapse, Krasnodar, Novorossiysk-Taman, and Kerch-Eltigen operations. Her sniper tally totaled 120 kills at the time of her death. After she was killed in action she was buried in a mass grave on hill 102.0 near Dzhankoy, although she was later reburied in 1953 in the mass grave dedicated to those who died in the battle for Adzhi-Mushkay. Posthumously nominated for the title Hero of the Soviet Union on 22 November 1943 by lieutenant-colonel Rutsinsky, she was awarded the title by decree of the Supreme Soviet on 16 May 1944.

== See also ==
- Aliya Moldagulova
- Lyudmila Pavlichenko
