= Yedma =

Yedma Едьма
- Village
- Location within Arkhangelsk Oblast Location within Russia
- Coordinates: 61°18′N 43°42′E
- Country: Russia
- Region: Arkhangelsk Oblast
- District: Ustyansky District
- Time zone: UTC+3:00

Yedma (Russian: Едьма) is a rural locality (a village) in Bereznitskoye rural settlement of Ustyansky District, Arkhangelsk Oblast, Russia. The population was 179 as of 2010. There are 5 streets.

== Geography ==
Edma is located on the Ustya River, 47 km northeast of Oktyabrsky (the district's administrative centre) by road. Beryozhnaya is the nearest rural locality.
