= Manshuk Mametova =

Soviet Kazakh machine gunner (1922–1943)

- Мәншүк Жиенғалиқызы Мәметова
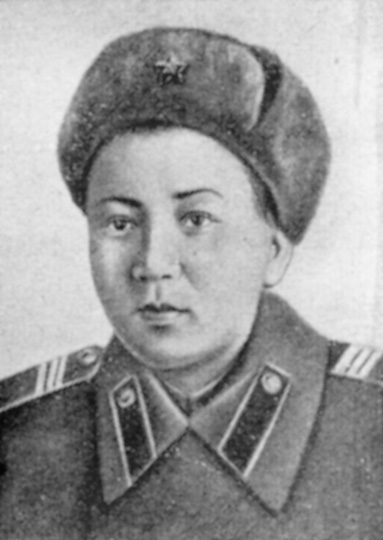
- Born: 23 October 1922; Jiekqūm, Kirghiz ASSR (located within present-day Bokey Orda District, Kazakhstan)
- Died: 15 October 1943 (aged 20); Nevel, Tver Oblast, Russian SFSR
- Military career
- Allegiance: Soviet Union
- Branch: Infantry
- Service years: 1942–1943
- Rank: Senior Sergeant
- Unit: 100th Rifle Brigade
- Conflicts: Second World War †
- Awards: Hero of the Soviet Union

Manshuk Zhiengalikyzy Mametova (Kazakh: Мәншүк Жиенғалиқызы Мәметова, Mänşük Jienğaliqyzy Mämetova; Russian: Маншук Жиенгалиевна Маметова, romanized: Manshuk Zhiengalievna Mametova; 23 October 1922 – 15 October 1943) was a machine gunner of the 100th Rifle Brigade in the 21st Guards Rifle Division of the 3rd Shock Army on the Kalinin Front during the Second World War. She became the first Kazakh woman to be awarded the title Hero of the Soviet Union after the Supreme Soviet posthumously awarded her the title on 1 March 1944.

== Early life ==
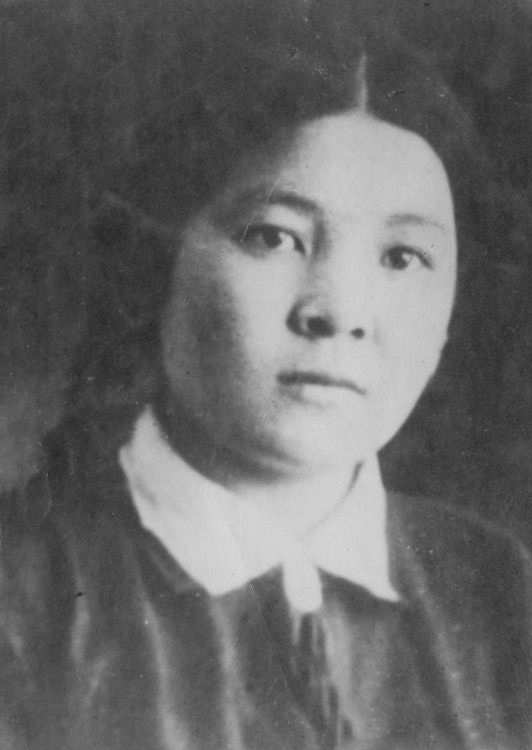
Mametova in 1937

Born to a shoemaker in the Ural region of what is now Kazakhstan, Mametova spent her childhood in Alma-Ata under the care of her aunt Amina Mametova. Her parents had given her to her aunt and uncle who did not have any children. During the Great Purge her adoptive uncle was arrested. Before his arrest he had encouraged Mametova to study medicine. After graduating from secondary school she studied nursing while working at the Council of People's Commissars of the Kazakh SSR as a secretary to the deputy chairman. She later enrolled in the Alma-Ata medical institute for further training. After the German invasion of the Soviet Union she tried to join the Red Army and after being rejected she continued medical training and learned how to use a gun.

== Military career ==
After persistently requesting to join the military despite being repeatedly rejected, Mametova was eventually accepted into the Red Army in September 1942 to work as a clerk at an Army headquarters before being sent to work as a nurse in a field hospital despite her request to be assigned to a rifle unit. While working as a nurse she continued her training on the use of a Maxim machine gun. After her commander tested her shooting skills he promoted her to the rank of Senior Sergant allowed her to be transferred to the 100th Rifle Brigade, frequently referred to as the 100th Kazakh Rifle Brigade because 86% of its soldiers were Kazakh. During the war she fell in love with another machine gunner, Nurken Khusainov, but only told a friend about her feelings. Both Mametova and Khusainov died on 15 October 1943 in Nevel. Throughout the war she never parted with her weapon and earned the respect of the other soldiers in her division after her baptism by fire, during which she lured enemy soldiers to approach before opening fire on them with her machine gun.

=== Last stand ===
After Soviet forces retook Nevel, a series of German counterattacks began. On 15 October 1943, Mametova did not retreat from a strategic hill with the rest of her unit; when waves of German soldiers began to approach. German soldiers tried to eliminate the three machine gun posts Mametova was crawling between using shells and mortar attacks. She was hit in the head and knocked out, but she regained consciousness and continued firing. Another soldier from her regiment, Akhmetzhanov, repeatedly asked her to retreat with them but she refused and continued shooting, saying that if she stopped shooting the Germans would only advance more and they will all be killed. The barrage of shelling and mortar attacks killed off the rest of her machine gun crew who briefly came to her aid, so she moved her gun to a different position and continued firing on wave after wave of Wehrmacht Heer forces alone, inflicting heavy casualties on the enemy. Eventually Mametova was mortally wounded by a hail of enemy fire, but continued fighting until she died of her wounds. She killed more than 70 enemy combatants in her final battle. Her remains were discovered by Soviet forces when they managed to expel German forces and she was buried in Nevel, where a monument dedicated to her bravery was installed.

== Recognition ==
External images
- Grave of Mametova in Nevel
- Statue of Mametova in Nevel

After her last stand Mametova was posthumously awarded the title Hero of the Soviet Union after Soviet survivors of the battle told of her bravery. She and sniper Aliya Moldagulova were the only Kazakh women to become Heroines of the Soviet Union and remain highly revered in Kazakhstan and Russia. A statue of Mametova was constructed in Oral, but it was renovated in 2015 to include Aliya Moldagulova and navigator Khiuaz Dospanova; the monument was renamed "Glorious daughters of the Kazakh people". Mametova became one of the most revered heroines of the Soviet Union, with poems, a museum, and songs dedicated to her, demonstrating her as a role model of a soldier who refused to retreat. In 1969 the Soviet movie "Song of Manshuk" depicted her life in the war, with actress Natalya Arinbasarova playing the role of the heroine. Many streets and schools in Almaty, Nevel, Oral and other cities were named after her, including the Manshuk Mametova College of Humanities. Mametova's portrait was featured on multiple stamps of Kazakhstan and a postal cover of the Soviet Union.

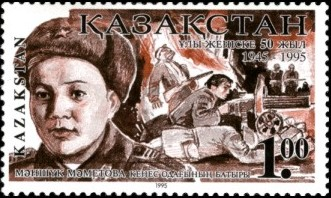
1995 stamp of Kazakhstan featuring Mametova

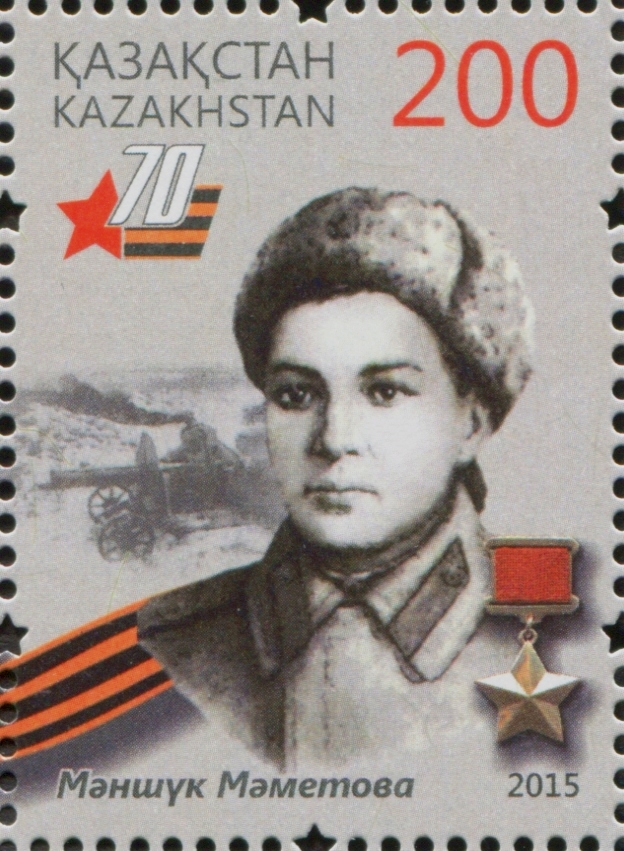
2015 stamp of Kazakhstan featuring Mametova

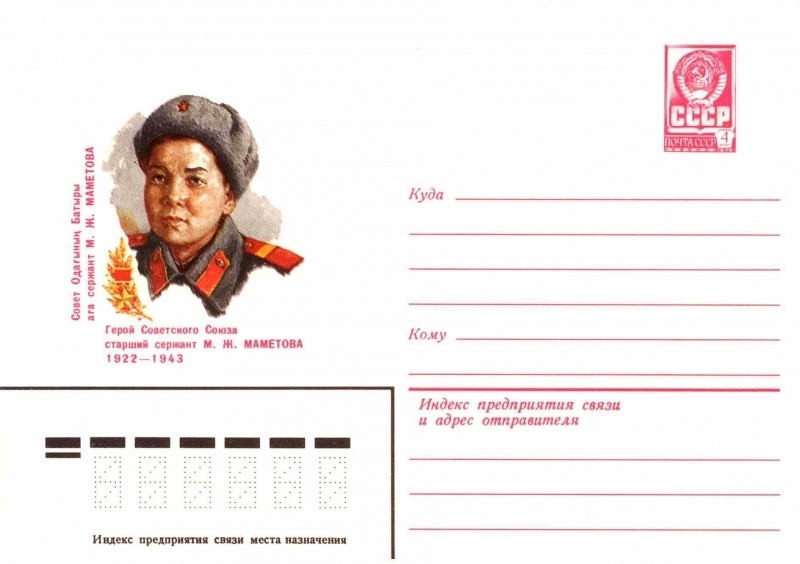
Soviet envelope with portrait of Mametova

== See also ==
- List of female Heroes of the Soviet Union
- List of Kazakh Heroes of the Soviet Union
- Aliya Moldagulova
- Khiuaz Dospanova
- Danutė Stanelienė
- Nina Onilova
