= 467th Guards District Training Centre =

467th Guards District Training Center (1987–present) 26th Guards Tank Training Division (1979–87) 53rd Guards Motor Rifle Training Division (1964–79) 62nd Guards Motor Rifle Training Division (1960–64) 62nd Guards Motor Rifle Division (1957–60) 62nd Guards Mechanised Division (1953–57) 1st Separate Guards Rifle Brigade (1946–53) 53rd Guards Rifle Division (1942–46) 130th Rifle Division (II) (January–December 1942) 3rd Moscow Communist Rifle Division (November 1941 – January 1942) Moscow Worker's Division (October–November 1941)
- Active: 1941–present
- Country: Soviet Union; Russia
- Branch: Red Army (1941-1946); Soviet Army (1946-1991); Russian Ground Forces (1991-present)
- Type: Infantry/Motorized Infantry/Training
- Part of: Moscow Military District
- Garrison/HQ: Kovrov
- Engagements: World War II
- Decorations: Order of the Red Banner
- Battle honours: Moscow; Tartu

The 467th Guards District Training Center for Junior Specialists of the Moscow Military District (Note: Russian: 467 гвардейский Краснознамённый Московско-Тартуский межвидовой окружной учебный центр подготовки младших специалистов, romanized: 467 gvardeyskiy Krasnoznamyonnyy Moskovsko-Tartuskiy mezhvidovoy okruzhnoy uchebnyy tsentr podgotovki mladshikh spetsialistov) is a training formation of the Russian Ground Forces.

The training center traces its heritage back to the Moscow Workers' Division, a People's Militia division formed during the Battle of Moscow in October 1941. This unit was redesignated as the 3rd Moscow Communist Rifle Division within weeks, and fought in the Battle of Moscow. In January 1942 it was converted into a regular unit, the 130th Rifle Division (Second Formation). For its actions, the division became the 53rd Guards Rifle Division in December of that year. The 53rd Guards served through the rest of the war, later receiving the honorific "Tartu" and the Order of the Red Banner.

After the end of the war, the division was relocated to Kovrov and became the 1st Separate Guards Rifle Brigade in 1946. In 1953, the brigade became the 62nd Guards Mechanised Division, and in the 1957 Soviet Army reorganisation it was redesignated the 62nd Guards Motor Rifle Division. The division became a training unit in 1960 and was renumbered as the 53rd Guards Motor Rifle Training Division four years later, restoring its original World War II designation. In 1979 it was converted into the 26th Guards Tank Training Division, and in 1987 it assumed its current title, the 467th Guards District Training Centre.

== History ==
=== World War II ===
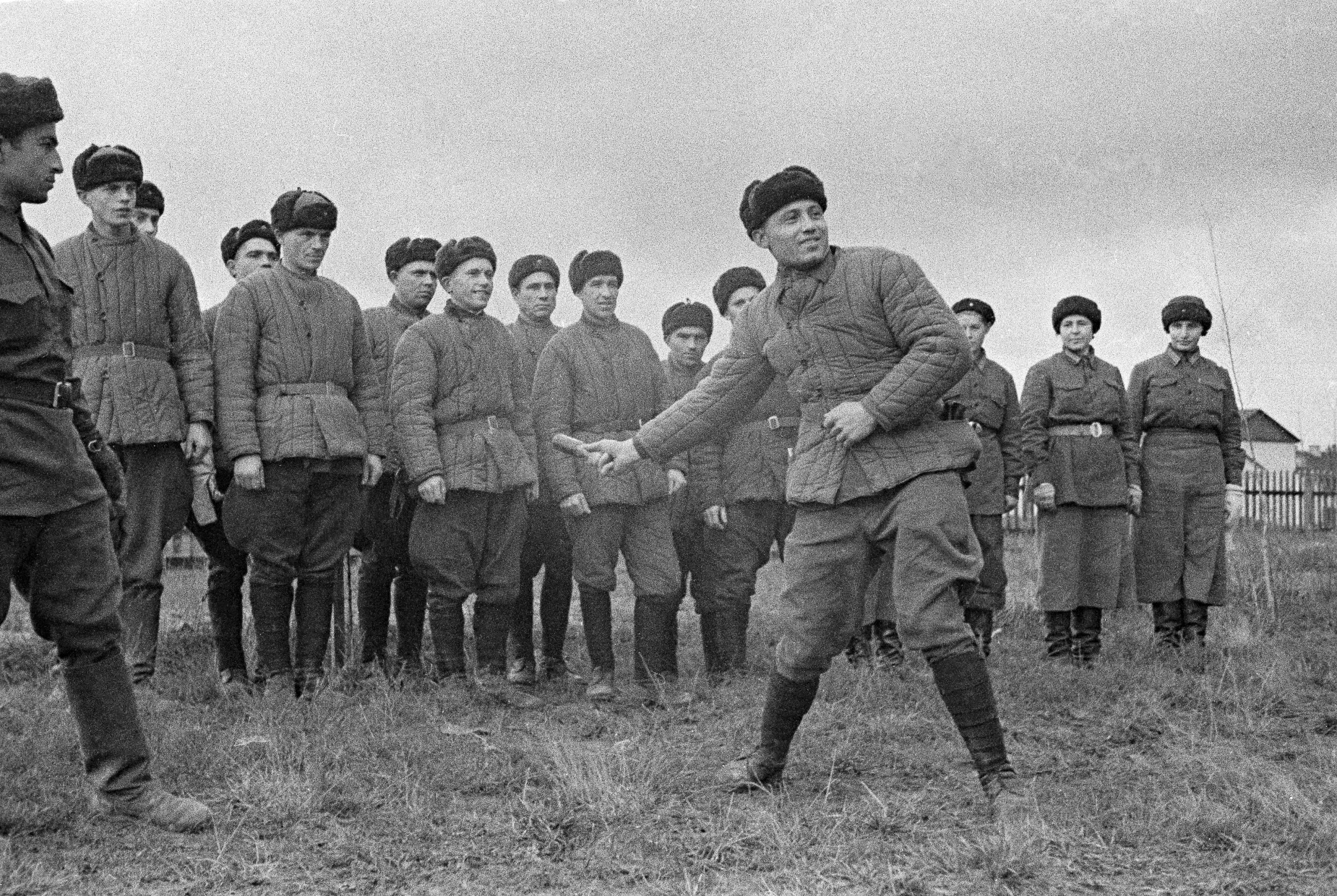
Soldiers of the 3rd Moscow People's Militia Division training to throw hand grenades, October 1941

It traces its history from Moscow militia units of the Second World War. The division was originally formed as the Moscow Worker's Division on 28 October 1941 in the Moscow Military District. On 14 November it was redesignated the 3rd Moscow Communist Rifle Division (also reported as the 3rd Moscow Communist People's Militia Division). It received a baptism of fire in the northwestern part of the group of the Moscow Defense Zone. It then became the 130th Rifle Division (Second Formation) on 22 January 1942. The division was given a Guards banner on 8 December 1942 in the North-Western Front, when it became 53rd Guards Rifle Division. On 28 April 1943 the division was awarded the Order of the Red Banner. In August 1944 it received the honorary name of "Tartu". From Moscow it fought through the cities of Staraya Russa, Leningrad, Pskov, Tartu, and Riga. With 51st Army of the Kurland Group (Leningrad Front) May 1945. The division ended the war on 9 May in Liepāja, Latvia.

During the war, two women snipers from the division, Maria Polivanova and Natalya Kovshova, were awarded the title Hero of the Soviet Union. In addition, Azerbaijani Junior Lieutenant Ziba Ganiyeva was a female sniper with the division who accounted for 21 kills and was awarded the Medal For the Defence of Moscow, Order of the Red Banner and the Order of the Red Star.

=== Cold War ===
On 14 May 1946, the division became the 1st Separate Guards Rifle Brigade. On 18 September 1953, it became the 62nd Guards Mechanised Division. The division became a motor rifle division on 26 March 1957, and has been stationed at Kovrov, Vladimir Oblast ever since. On 23 April 1960, it was converted into a training unit. The division's original World War II number was restored on 1 December 1964 when it was renumbered as the 53rd Guards Motor Rifle Training Division. In October 1966 it received the honorific "Moscow". The division was awarded with a Banner of the CPSU Central Committee, the Presidium of the USSR Supreme Soviet and the Council of Ministers, the sign "50 years of the USSR", Honorary Diploma of the Supreme Soviet of the USSR.

The division became the 26th Guards Tank Training Division on 29 December 1979. On 3 October 1987 the 26th Guards Tank Training Division became the 467th District Training Centre.

=== Russian Ground Forces ===
At the end of the Cold War, the 11th Guards Tank Division's 44th Guards Tank Regiment withdrew from Germany to Vladimir in the Russian Federation, joining the centre, in the Moscow Military District. On its arrival it absorbed the 9th Tank Training Regiment.

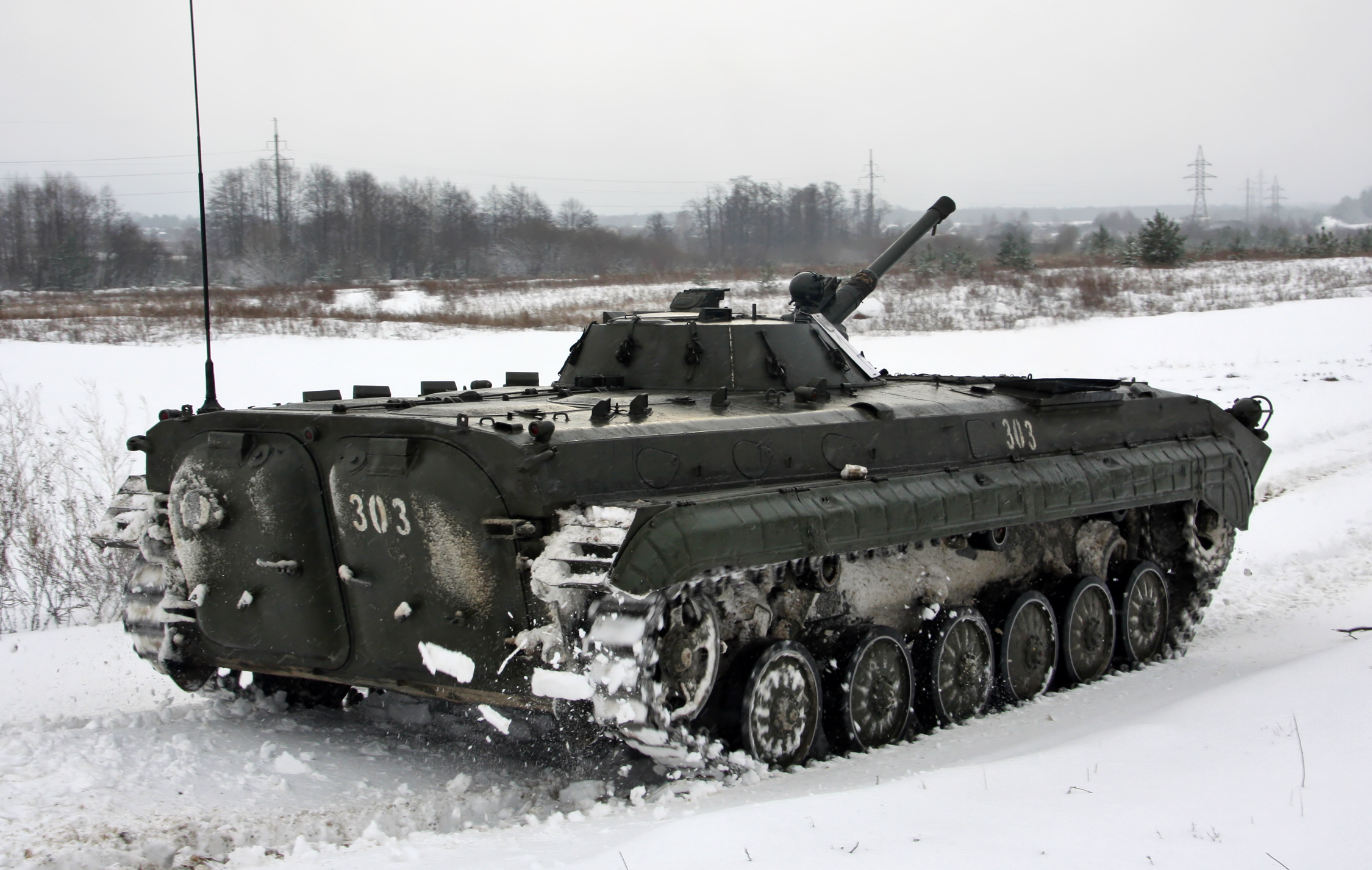
A BMP-1 of the training centre, 2011

On 1 September 2012 it became 467th Guards Red Banner Moscow-Tartu District Training Centre for junior specialists of the Western Military District. In 2013, training of specialists of motorised infantry, armored forces, air defense forces and artillery, strategic rocket forces, unmanned aircraft, engineering, service dogs, communications, NBC defense, air force, navy, military, aerospace defense, and cooks was being carried out. The centre consists of 26 compounds of military units deployed in 10 oblasts/regions of Russia, in three federal districts.

The 71st anniversary of the division was marked by the descendant 467th Guards District Training Centre in 2013. A veteran who attended the feast, Stanislav Iofin, one of the first volunteer militia - and one of the 29 survivors said '..In the division were more than 700 people [sic; probably referring to female personnel]: snipers, machine gunners, and there was even a female mortar crew! Among them, a lot of Heroes of the Soviet Union, and the man who was awarded the highest award - the Order of Lenin - was also a woman. Women fought with dignity, they deserve the utmost respect.'
