= 130th Rifle Division =

130th Rifle Division (November 1939 – October 20, 1941) 130th Rifle Division (January 22, 1942 – December 8, 1942) 130th Rifle Division (May 1, 1943 – February 18, 1947)
- Active: 1939–1947
- Country: Soviet Union
- Branch: Red Army (1939-46)
- Type: Infantry
- Size: Division
- Engagements: Operation Barbarossa; Battle of Uman; Battle of the Sea of Azov; Battle of Moscow; Kholm Pocket; Demyansk Pocket; Donbas strategic offensive (July 1943); Donbas strategic offensive (August 1943); Melitopol offensive Battle of the Dnieper; Bereznegovatoye–Snigirevka offensive Operation Bagration; Bobruysk offensive Minsk offensive Baranovichi-Slonim Operation; Lublin–Brest offensive Gumbinnen Operation; East Prussian offensive Heiligenbeil Pocket; Battle of Berlin; Battle of Halbe
- Decorations: Order of Lenin; Order of the Red Banner; Order of Suvorov (all 3rd Formation)
- Battle honours: Taganrog (3rd Formation)

Commanders
- Notable commanders: Kombrig Pavel Ivanovich Abramidze; Maj. Gen. Viktor Alekseevich Vizzhilin; Col. Semyon Sergeevich Safronov; Col. Nikolai Pavlovich Anisimov; Col. Mikhail Vasilevich Romanovskii; Maj. Gen. Konstantin Vasilevich Sychyov; Col. Konstantin Stepanovich Popov

The 130th Rifle Division was first formed as an infantry division of the Red Army in November 1939 in the Kiev Special Military District, based on the shtat (table of organization and equipment) of the previous September. At the start of the German invasion in June 1941 it was still in that District, part of the reserve 55th Rifle Corps. It quickly took up positions in prepared defenses west of Mohyliv-Podilskyi as it was incorporated into Southern Front. It remained defending along the Dniestr River into mid-July when it began falling back toward the Dniepr, avoiding being trapped near Uman in the process. The division remained in positions along that river until after the encirclement and destruction of Southwestern Front east of Kyiv left it vulnerable to a renewed German drive toward the Sea of Azov. It was overrun on the open steppe in early October and soon disbanded.

The 3rd Moscow Communist Rifle Division began forming on October 24 from worker's regiments in that city, now under immediate threat following Operation Typhoon. Once formed a few weeks later it took up fortified positions in the Moscow Defence Zone until January 1942 when it was redesignated as the new 130th Rifle Division and moved north to join the 3rd Shock Army of Kalinin Front near Kholm. After playing a secondary role in the fighting for that place it was transferred to Northwestern Front near Demyansk, where it soon joined 53rd Army. Until August it was largely involved in holding the line, after which it saw increasing action, eventually in the 1st Shock Army, although without any great success. Despite this, on December 8 it became the 53rd Guards Rifle Division.

The final 130th was formed near Rostov-on-Don from a pair of rifle brigades in 28th Army of Southern Front on May 1, 1943. It was soon moved to 44th Army of the same Front, and took part in both the July and August offensives to break into the Donbas region, helping to recapture Taganrog in late August and winning its name as an honorific. About 10 days later, as its advance continued, it was also awarded the Order of the Red Banner. After 44th Army was disbanded it returned to 28th Army, and as it continued to move through southern Ukraine it was also assigned to 5th Shock and 3rd Guards Armies in the now-renamed 4th Ukrainian Front. In March 1944 it was back in 5th Shock, now in 3rd Ukrainian Front, when it participated in the capture of Mikolaiv, for which it was awarded the Order of Suvorov. Almost immediately it was removed to the Reserve of the Supreme High Command and began moving north, again returning to 28th Army, where it would remain for the duration. This Army joined 1st Belorussian Front in May, in time to take part in Operation Bagration in Belarus, during which it received the unusual award of the Order of Lenin for its part in the fighting for the Belarusian capital. From there it continued to advance toward Baranavichy and Brest, eventually reaching the border of East Prussia. During the offensive into Poland and Germany in January 1945, as part of 3rd Belorussian Front, it took part in the fighting to reduce the German forces trapped southwest of Königsberg before again entering the Reserve of the Supreme High Command and being moved southwest with its Army to join 1st Ukrainian Front. Arriving after the start of the Berlin operation it helped encircle and reduce German 9th Army south of the German capital. Shortly after the German surrender it began moving back to the USSR, and it was disbanded at Slonim in February 1947.

== 1st Formation ==
The division was formed at Mohyliv-Podilskyi in the Kiev Special Military District in early November 1939. Kombrig Pavel Ivanovich Abramidze was soon assigned to command, but he left this post on January 1, 1940, to take command of the 72nd Rifle Division and was replaced by Kombrig Viktor Alekseevich Vizzhilin; this officer would have his rank modernized to that of major general on June 4. At the time of the German invasion on June 22, 1941, the division's order of battle was as follows:

- 371st Rifle Regiment
- 528th Rifle Regiment
- 664th Rifle Regiment
- 363rd Artillery Regiment
- 496th Howitzer Regiment
- 215th Antitank Battalion
- 163rd Antiaircraft Battalion
- 151st Reconnaissance Battalion
- 192nd Sapper Battalion
- 143rd Signal Battalion
- 122nd Medical/Sanitation Battalion
- 103rd Chemical Defense (Anti-gas) Company
- 130th Motor Transport Battalion
- 279th Field Bakery
- 49th Divisional Artillery Workshop
- 340th Field Artillery Repair Shop
- 461st Field Postal Station
- 348th Field Office of the State Bank

The division had been part of 55th Rifle Corps since April, along with the 169th and 189th Rifle Divisions. On the day of the invasion Kiev Special District was redesignated as Southwestern Front, and the 130th and 169th received orders to occupy the 12th Mogilev-Podolsk Fortified Region. On June 25 it was assigned to the newly-formed Southern Front, and within days the 55th Corps, minus the 189th Division, came under command of 18th Army.

=== Battle of Uman ===
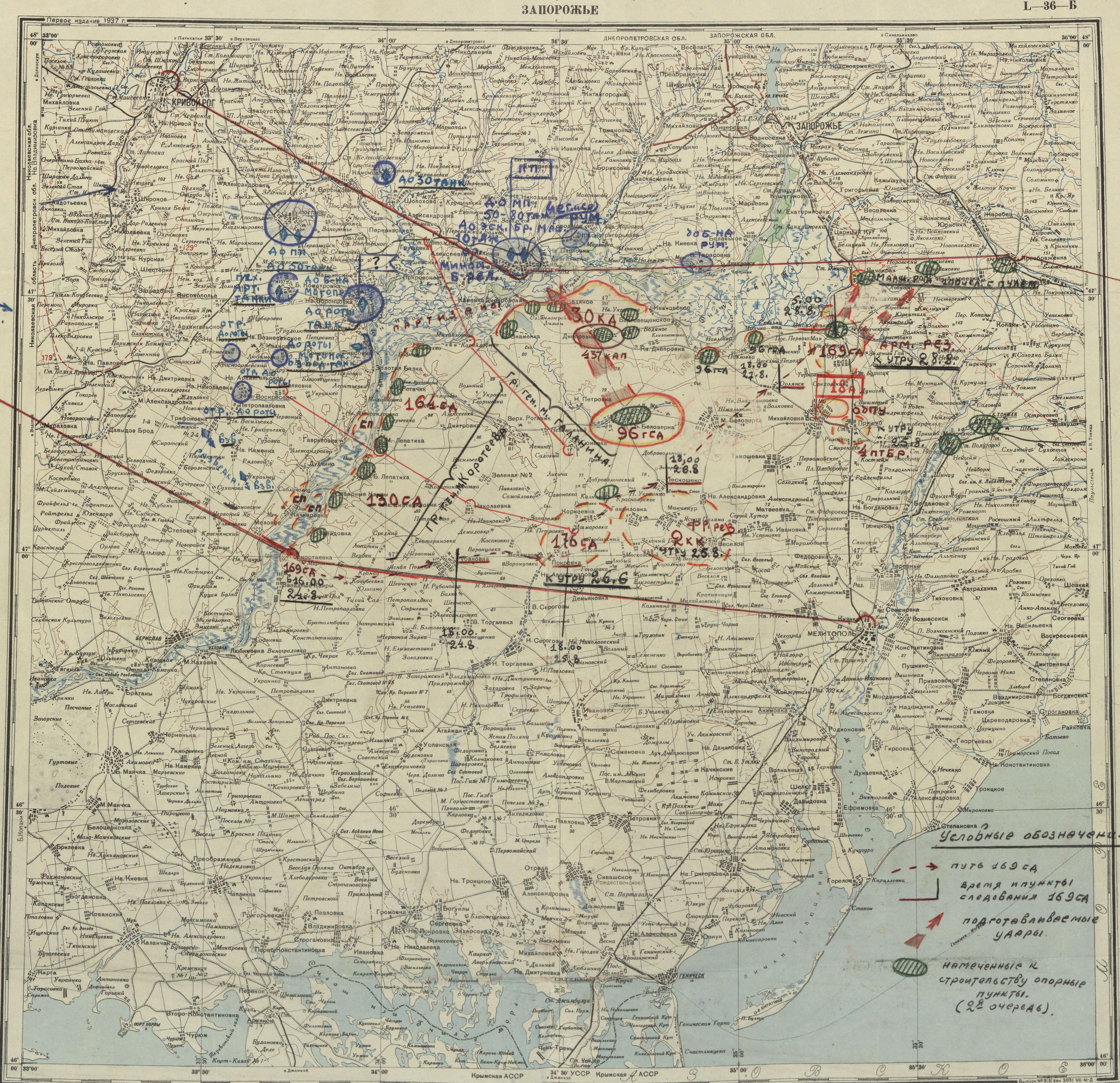
Positions of the 130th along the Dniepr in August

By July 13 the 55th Corps was still holding a front along the Dniestr northwest and southeast of Mohyliv-Podilskyi. The two divisions of the Corps were under attack from the Romanian 3rd Army and were soon forced to fall back to the southeast; the Corps was located roughly halfway between its former location and the city of Kodyma by July 23 and then beyond that place by the end of the month. General Vizzhilin left the division on July 25, being replaced by Col. Semyon Sergeevich Safronov. Vizzhilin was briefly placed at disposal of the main personnel directorate before being made deputy commander of 1st Guards Rifle Corps. After serving in several staff positions he was given command of the 288th Rifle Division in March 1942 but was badly wounded in May and never returned to the front.

The retreat from the Dniestr placed 55th Corps south of the Axis forces that were proceeding to envelop the 6th and 12th Armies to the north in the Uman area. This was completed on August 1, and over the following days the 130th and 169th attempted to aid the breakout of the encircled Soviet forces, during which the commander of the latter was mortally wounded.

==== Retreat through south Ukraine ====
By mid-August the 130th had taken up positions on the east bank of the lower Dniepr between Hornostaivka and Velyka Lepetykha. Southern Front largely escaped the debacle suffered by Southwestern Front east of Kiyv in September and the 130th continued to retreat with 18th Army during this period. Following this victory the OKH ordered Army Group South to attack simultaneously toward Kharkiv, the Donbas, and Rostov-on-Don, with its left wing forces, while the right wing encircled Southern Front and invaded the Crimea. 1st Panzer Army attacked off the march from the Poltava area and soon smashed the defenses of 12th Army before exploiting toward Melitopol, encircling six divisions of the Front's 18th and 6th Armies on October 7. Over the next three days elements of the 18th were able to break out toward Taganrog, pursued by panzers which halted on the Mius River to regroup on October 13. During this fighting the 130th was effectively overrun and scattered. Colonel Safronov was lost in the chaos on October 16, being replaced by Lt. Col. Fyodor Andreevich Kovalev. This officer was killed in action on October 20, and while some individuals and small groups managed to escape the division was written off the same day.

== 3rd Moscow Communist Rifle Division ==
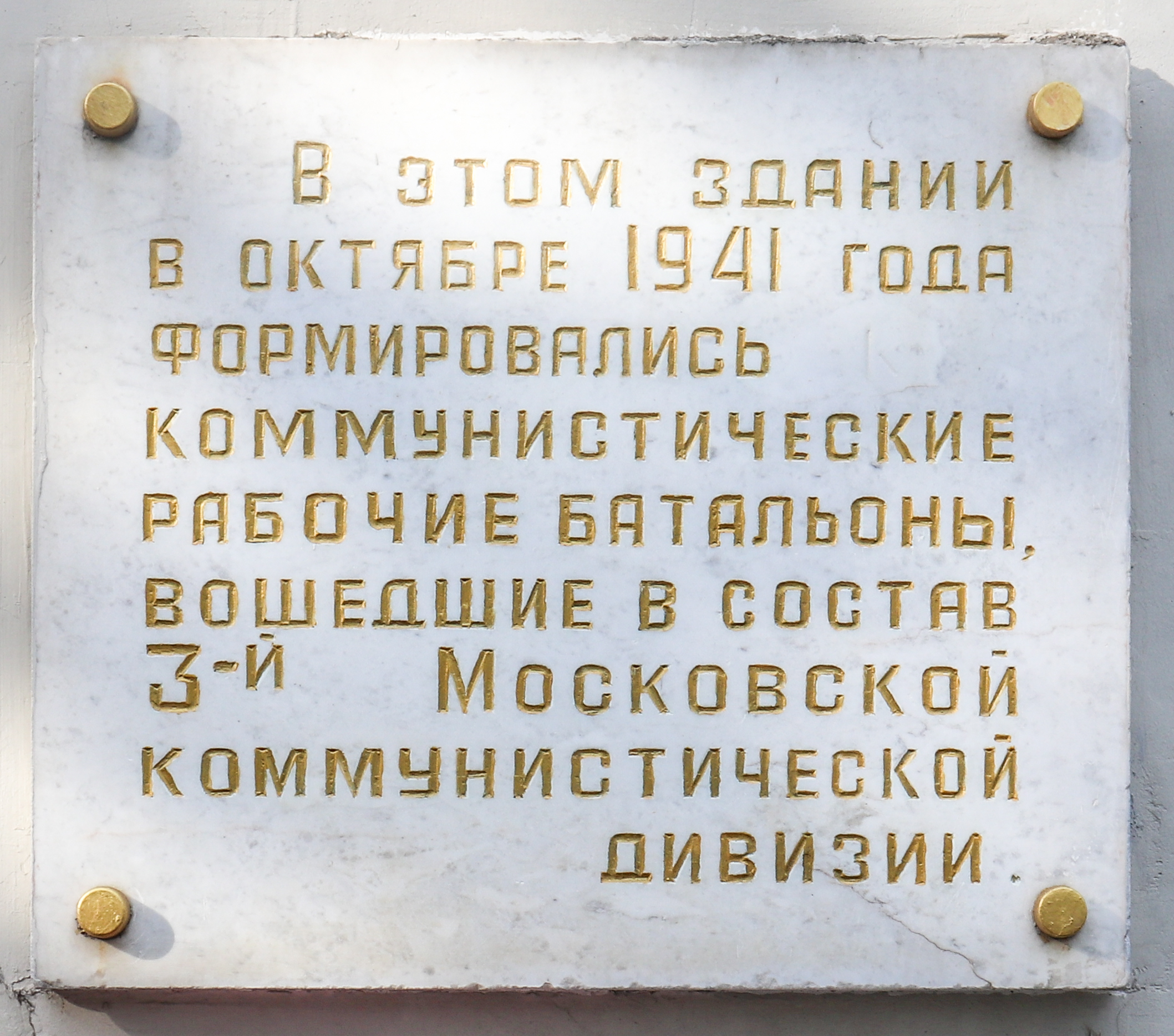
Memorial to the formation of 3rd Moscow Communist Rifle Division, 6 Chapaevskii Lane

This division, also called the "Moscow Worker's Division", was formed beginning on October 24 from 9,753 men and women from the city's worker's defense battalions that had begun forming in July. These personnel included 3,173 members of the Communist Party and 3,564 Komsomols, making up a full 70 percent, higher than nearly any other Soviet division formed during the war. The armies that had been defending west of Moscow had been largely destroyed during Operation Typhoon earlier in the month and the capital was under direct threat. Col. Andrei Ivanovich Romashenko was given command the day it began forming; he had been serving as commandant of the 35th Fortified Region of the Moscow Military District since May. The division's order of battle was as follows:

- 1st Worker's Regiment (five battalions)
- 2nd Worker's Regiment (four battalions)
- 3rd Worker's Regiment (three battalions)
- Artillery Regiment (three battalions)
- Antitank Battalion
- Mortar Battalion
- Antiaircraft Battalion
- Reconnaissance Company
- Sapper Battalion
- Signal Battalion
- Medical/Sanitation Battalion
- Chemical Defense (Anti-gas) Company
- Motor Transport Company
- Divisional Veterinary Hospital

The division was declared as "ready for the front" on October 28 while in fact it was still forming up. It was recorded on this date as having just 6,990 rifles, 40 submachine guns, 479 machine guns of all types, and 44 artillery pieces of all calibres.

=== Battle of Moscow ===
Two further Communist rifle divisions, the 4th and 5th, were formed at the same time from the district "destruction" battalions that had been formed in June/July, and the 2nd Moscow Rifle Division was created from mobilized Muscovites. Despite discouragement from the authorities, the divisions included some 600 women volunteers. This force was moved as soon as possible to the suburbs, establishing positions along the most vital routes into the city: the Kyiv and Minsk highways and the Kaluga, Volokolamsk, Leningrad, and Dmitrov roads. A great deal of effort was put into construction of defensive works, as well as front-line reconnaissance and combat. 3rd Communist was given specific responsibility for the Volokolamsk and Leningrad axes, as well as the Northern River Port at Khimki. On November 18 Colonel Romashenko left the 3rd Communist, being replaced by Col. Nikolai Pavlovich Anisimov. Romashenko was given command of the 74th Fortified Region in the Caucasus in May 1942 and was slated to take command of the 318th Rifle Division in August but was forced to escape from encirclement, after which he was arrested by the NKVD and condemned to death by a tribunal, a sentence which was carried out on December 15. Anisimov had been serving as chief of staff of 31st Army.

== 2nd Formation ==
At the start of the Moscow counteroffensive the division was taking part in reconnaissance activity toward Solnechnogorsk. Otherwise it remained on the defensive until January 22, 1942, when it was redesignated as the new 130th Rifle Division. It spent several weeks preparing for a move to the north and by February 19 it had joined Kalinin Front's 3rd Shock Army. After redesignation its order of battle was very similar to that of the 1st formation:

- 371st Rifle Regiment (from 1st Worker's Regiment)
- 528th Rifle Regiment (from 2nd Worker's Regiment)
- 664th Rifle Regiment (from 3rd Worker's Regiment)
- 363rd Artillery Regiment
- 215th Antitank Battalion
- 453rd Antiaircraft Battery
- 151st Reconnaissance Company
- 192nd Sapper Battalion
- 130th Signal Battalion (later 342nd Signal Company)
- 122nd Medical/Sanitation Battalion
- 103rd Chemical Defense (Anti-gas) Company
- 255th Motor Transport Company
- 153rd Field Bakery
- 994th Divisional Artillery Workshop
- 261st Field Postal Station (later 1802nd)
- 1601st Field Office of the State Bank (later 1135th)

Colonel Anisimov remained in command. During January and early February 3rd Shock, commanded by Lt. Gen. M. A. Purkaev, and 4th Shock Armies had carved out a huge salient centered around the town of Toropets, but the former was now bogged down in front of Velikiye Luki and the small town of Kholm.

=== Kholm Pocket ===
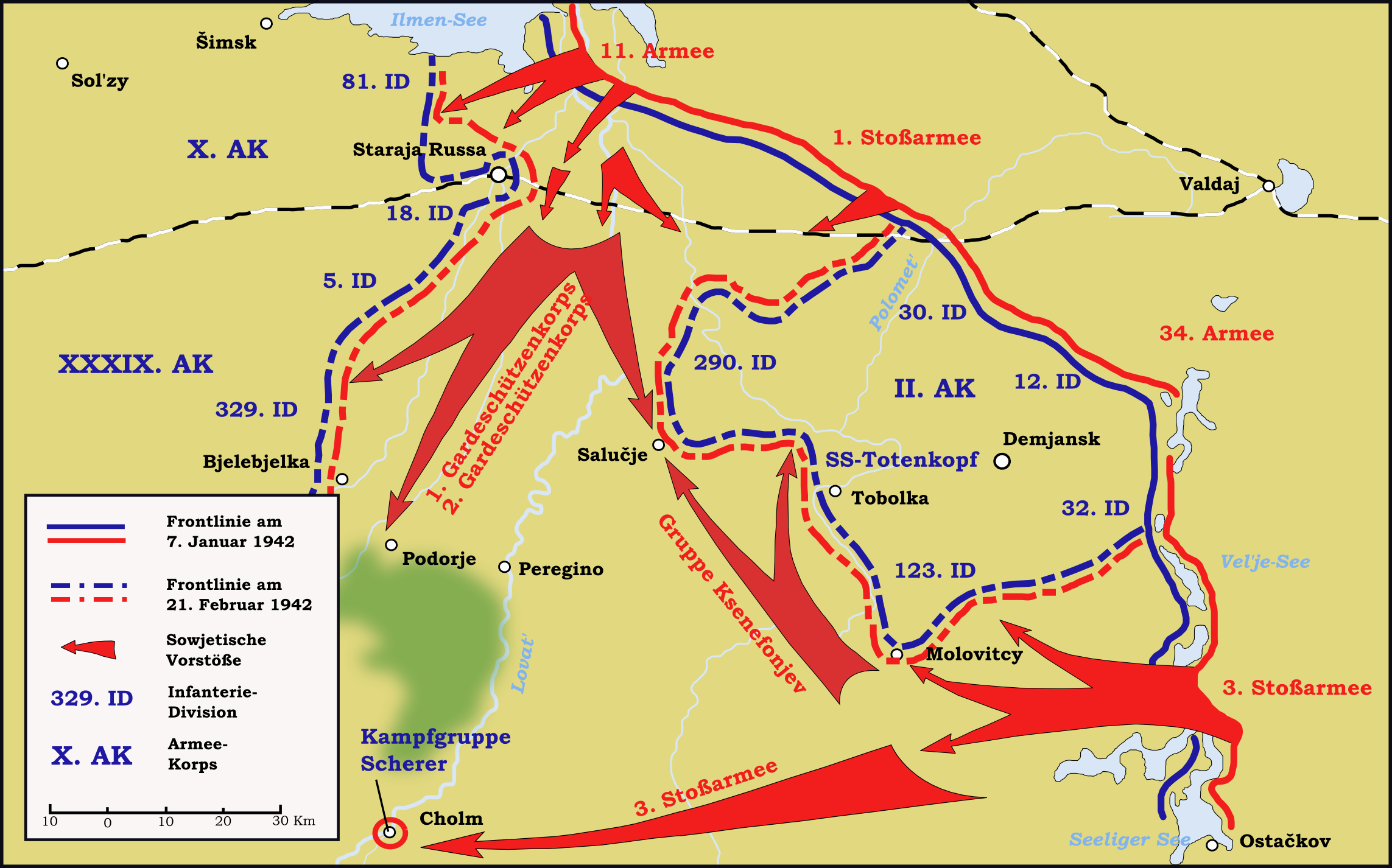
Encirclement of II Army Corps around Demyansk. Note advance of 3rd Shock Army to Kholm.

Kholm had been isolated by the 33rd Rifle Division on January 23 after a 110km pursuit of the routed 123rd Infantry Division. The town held a garrison of 3,158 German troops, organized as Battlegroup Scherer, and had been declared as a Festung by Hitler. For several days the encirclement was fairly loose and German reinforcements were able to enter up to January 28 when the pocket began to rely entirely on air supply, which had to be airdropped or landed by glider within the 2km-wide perimeter. By the end of the month both sides were burnt out.

Purkayev soon recognized that the 33rd alone could not take Kholm, and in early February reinforced the effort with the fresh 391st Rifle Division, a pair of T-34s and 11 T-60s of the 146th Tank Battalion, a regiment of 76mm artillery, and three Katyusha rocket launchers. In theory this gave him a 5:1 advantage in manpower. The attack resumed on February 13 with a sustained bombardment and air attacks, turning much of the town into rubble. A large dent was made in the perimeter but after five days of close combat the breach was sealed. On February 21 Purkayev prepared for his next big push following the arrival of the 130th, plus the 27th and 75th Rifle Brigades, which were sent in against Group Uckermann. This Group was operating a heavy artillery strongpoint at Dubrova, outside the perimeter, which was firing in support of the garrison. This position was taken after a two-day fight and Group Uckerman was forced to pull back. The 33rd had received replacements and on February 24 it and the 391st struck the southeast side of Kholm while the fresh 37th Rifle Brigade attacked from the north. This proved to be the crisis of the siege, but the Soviet forces were unable to capture the center of the town.

=== Demyansk Pocket ===
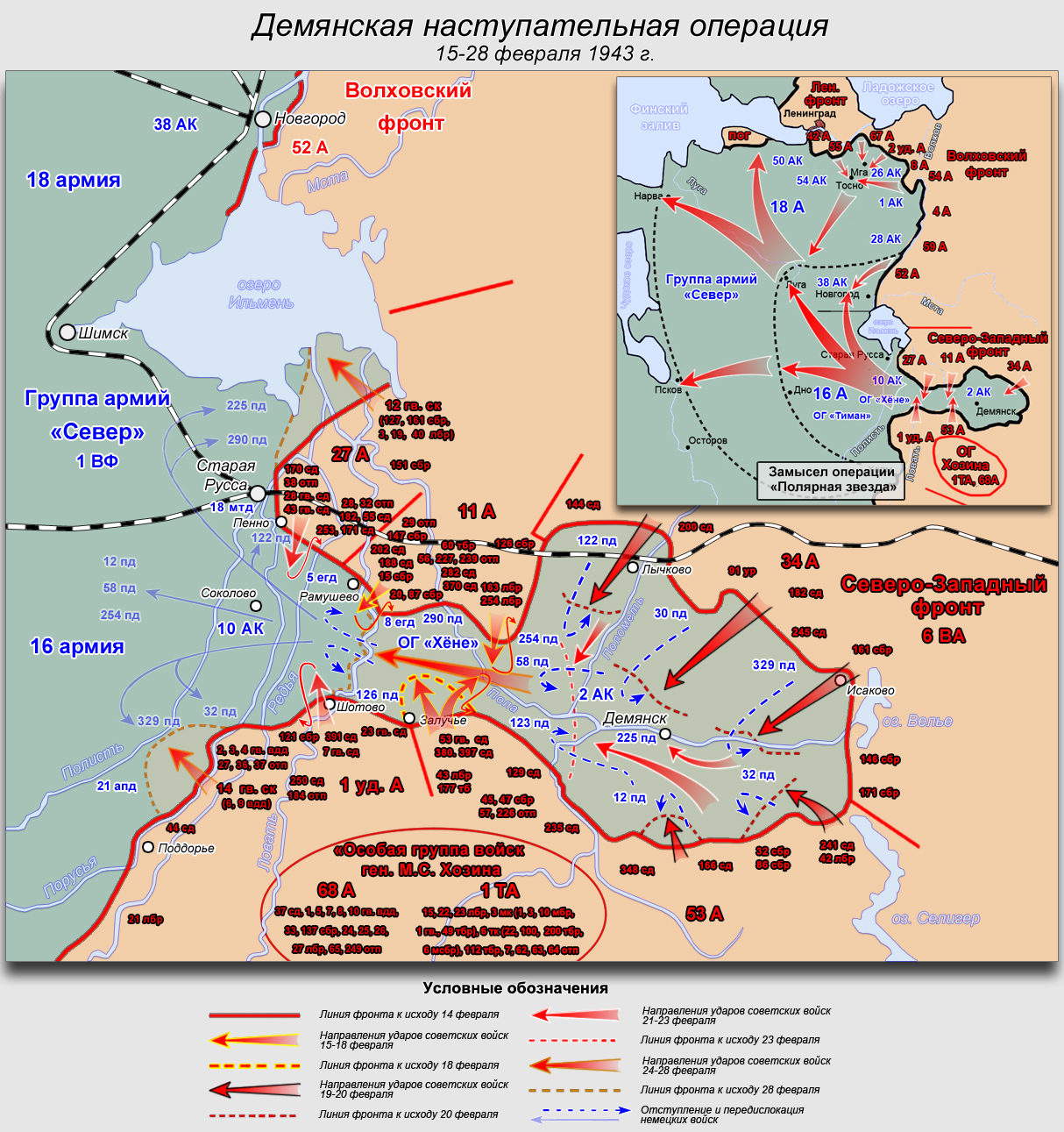
Demyansk Pocket in February 1943. Note position of the 53rd Guards Rifle Division (former 130th) in 53rd Army.

By the beginning of April the 130th had been transferred to Northwestern Front's 34th Army where it joined Operational Group Ksenofontov, led by Maj. Gen. A. S. Ksenofontov, and also containing the 23rd Rifle Division and six ski battalions. This Group had been formed in 3rd Shock in mid-February and on February 25 had linked up with the 1st Guards Rifle Corps to isolate German II Army Corps in and around Demyansk. As at Kholm, Hitler declared Demyansk a Festung. Group Ksenofontov and Group Moscow had then attacked on March 6–10 to break the outer perimeter of the pocket, but failed. By now Northwestern Front's winter counteroffensive had culminated, and the arrival of the 130th was insufficient to revive it, while II Corps was completely reliant on airlifted supplies.

On April 27 the 53rd Army was formed for the second time, with Ksenofontov in command and his forces incorporated to it. The Army was tasked with containing the southern side of the pocket with, initially, seven rifle divisions, two rifle brigades, and 10 ski battalions. By April 22 a "land bridge" was driven to the pocket through the village of Ramushevo, but it remained largely dependent on air supply. Over the coming months most of the fighting would involve Northwestern Front's efforts to close this corridor. In August the STAVKA sent orders to Lt. Gen. P. A. Kurochkin, commander of the Front, to launch another attack, this time making local attacks by 34th, 53rd, and 27th Armies around the perimeter of the salient to draw German reserves. This began on August 10, and led to arguably the best known incident in the division's history.

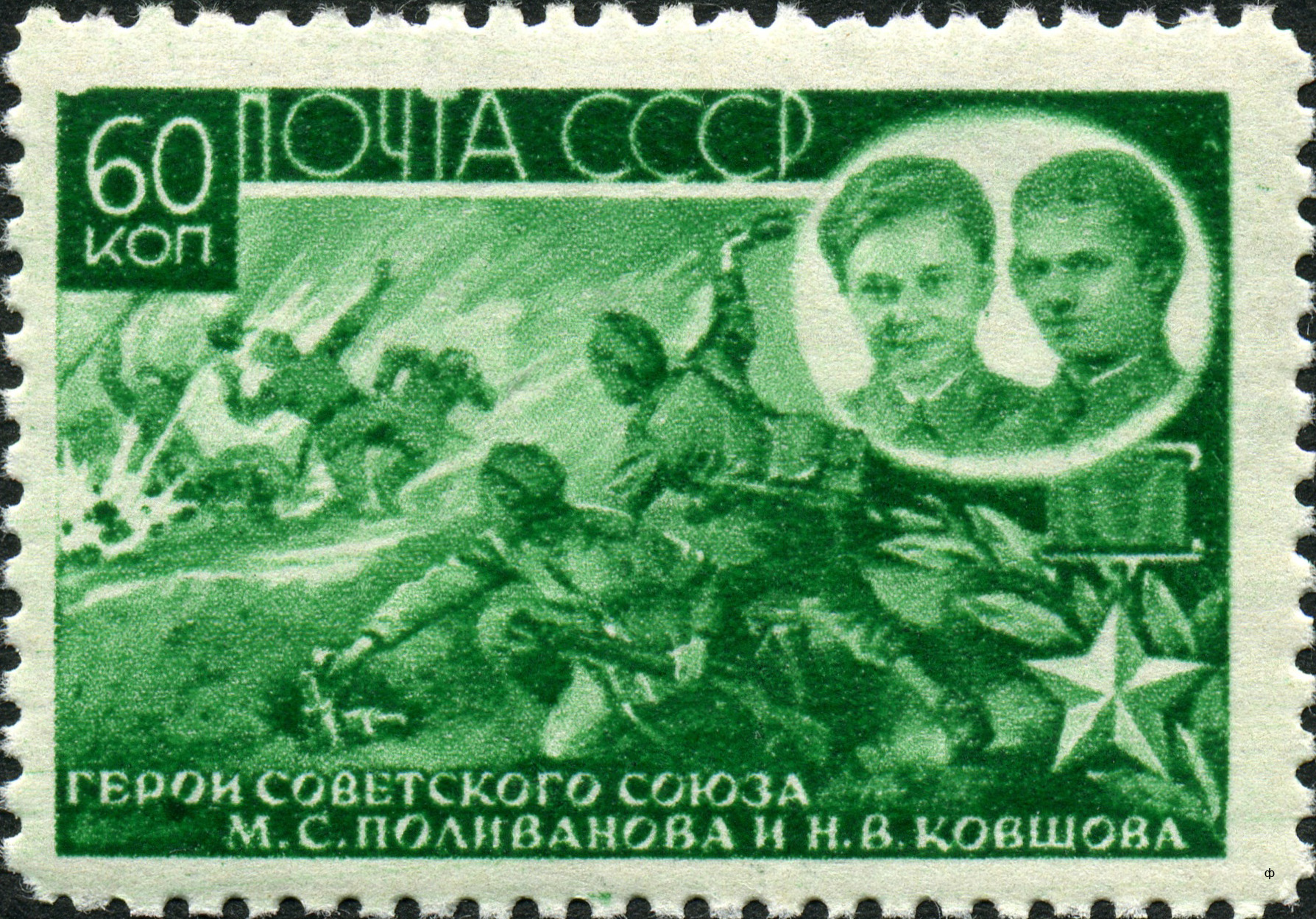
Soviet postage stamp commemorating Kovshova and Polivanova

Krasnoarmeets Natalia Venidiktovna Kovshova was born in Ufa and raised in Moscow. A Komsomol, at the outbreak of the war she enlisted in the Communist Battalion of the Comintern District and quickly became adept in the use of light and heavy weapons, becoming a sniper instructor. Attached to the 528th Rifle Regiment she scored her first kill on February 21, 1942, shooting a German sniper out of a tree. She now organized the "sniper movement" in the regiment, using a Mosin-Nagant 1891/30 rifle with a PE scope. She eventually formed a team with Krasnoarmeets Mariya Semyonova Polivanova, a native of Tula Oblast. Together during March 1-4 they destroyed a German machine gun crew and up to 20 infantrymen. Kovshova was lightly wounded on May 20 and again two weeks later, but soon returned to duty.

On August 14 the team was fighting near the village of Sutoki as part of a sniper platoon, but came under a series of German counterattacks. The platoon was surrounded; Kovshova and Polivanova continued firing from a trench until they exhausted their ammunition. With no other options available they prepared grenades, which they threw close enough to eliminate some of their attackers while also taking their own lives. The report of a survivor of the action was spread through the USSR, and on February 14, 1943, were both posthumously made Heroes of the Soviet Union. The two women were eventually buried near Staraya Russa. Officially they had jointly accounted for 300 German soldiers killed or wounded.

Kurochkin brought this unsuccessful offensive to a halt on August 21 due to excessive casualties and lack of ammunition. Shortly after the 130th was moved to 1st Shock Army, which had been conducting most of the assaults on the southern side of the Ramushevo corridor. On September 10 Colonel Anisimov became deputy to the commander of that Army, Lt. Gen. V. Z. Romanovskii and three days later Col. Mikhail Vasilevich Romanovskii took over the division. Anisimov would be relieved on January 24, 1943, for "indecisiveness", and sent to command the 7th Guards Rifle Division, followed by the 391st Division, before being moved to the training establishment in October.

By November Kurochkin was thoroughly discredited in the eyes of Stalin, and he called on Marshal S. K. Timoshenko to take over Northwestern Front on November 17. Timoshenko decided to move his axis of attack eastward from the neck of the corridor, hoping to find weaker defenses. On November 23/24, 11th Army carried out a successful operation against a German strongpoint, but this also gave away the change of direction. The main attack started on the morning of November 28, with two divisions of 11th Army pushing from the north and the 130th, plus two rifle brigades, driving from the south against the 126th Infantry Division. The defenders were on the alert and caused heavy casualties as the shock groups struggled through minefields and barbed wire. Neither army made more than local gains, but Timoshenko was ordered to continue after a brief pause in an effort to deflect attention from Operation Mars. German reinforcements from the siege of Leningrad made further progress impossible. In recognition of its achievements to date, on December 8 the division was redesignated as the 53rd Guards Rifle Division.

== 3rd Formation ==
A third 130th Rifle Division was formed on May 1, 1943, near Rostov-on-Don in the North Caucasus Military District based on a pair of rifle brigades.

=== 156th Rifle Brigade ===
This brigade began forming in September 1942 in the Central Asian Military District, and left there in December, moving via the Caspian Sea to Astrakhan before being assigned to 28th Army of Southern Front. As part of this Army it advanced along the north coast of the Gulf of Taganrog to the Mius River line in the first months of 1943.

=== 159th Rifle Brigade ===
The second brigade, under command of Lt. Col. A. I. Bulgakov, was formed at Astrakhan in the Stalingrad Military District, also in September 1942, and also assigned to 28th Army. Through October–December it screened the city and then began advancing with its Army through the Caucasus steppe. It was credited with the liberation of Bataysk near Rostov-on-Don on February 7, 1943, before also advancing to the Mius.

Once formed its order of battle was similar to that of the previous formations:

- 371st Rifle Regiment
- 528th Rifle Regiment
- 664th Rifle Regiment
- 363rd Artillery Regiment
- 215th Antitank Battalion
- 151st Reconnaissance Company
- 192nd Sapper Battalion
- 425th Signal Battalion (later 342nd Signal Company)
- 122nd Medical/Sanitation Battalion
- 103rd Chemical Defense (Anti-gas) Company
- 255th Motor Transport Company
- 153rd Field Bakery
- 994th Divisional Veterinary Hospital (later 988th)
- 2281st Field Postal Station
- 1252nd Field Office of the State Bank

Col. Fyodor Maksimovich Rukhlenko held command from May 3 to May 6, when he was replaced by Col. Konstantin Vasilevich Sychyov. This officer had previously led the 126th Rifle Division and been deputy commander of the 91st Rifle Division. He would be promoted to the rank of major general on November 2, 1944.

The Mius-Front had originally been established by Army Group South in the wake of its defeat at Rostov-on-Don in December 1941, and by now was a significant defensive position. Later in May, in preparation for the offensive to break this line, the 130th was transferred to the 37th Rifle Corps of 44th Army, on the left (south) flank of the Front from the Sea of Azov and north along the Mius.

== Donbas Strategic Offensives ==
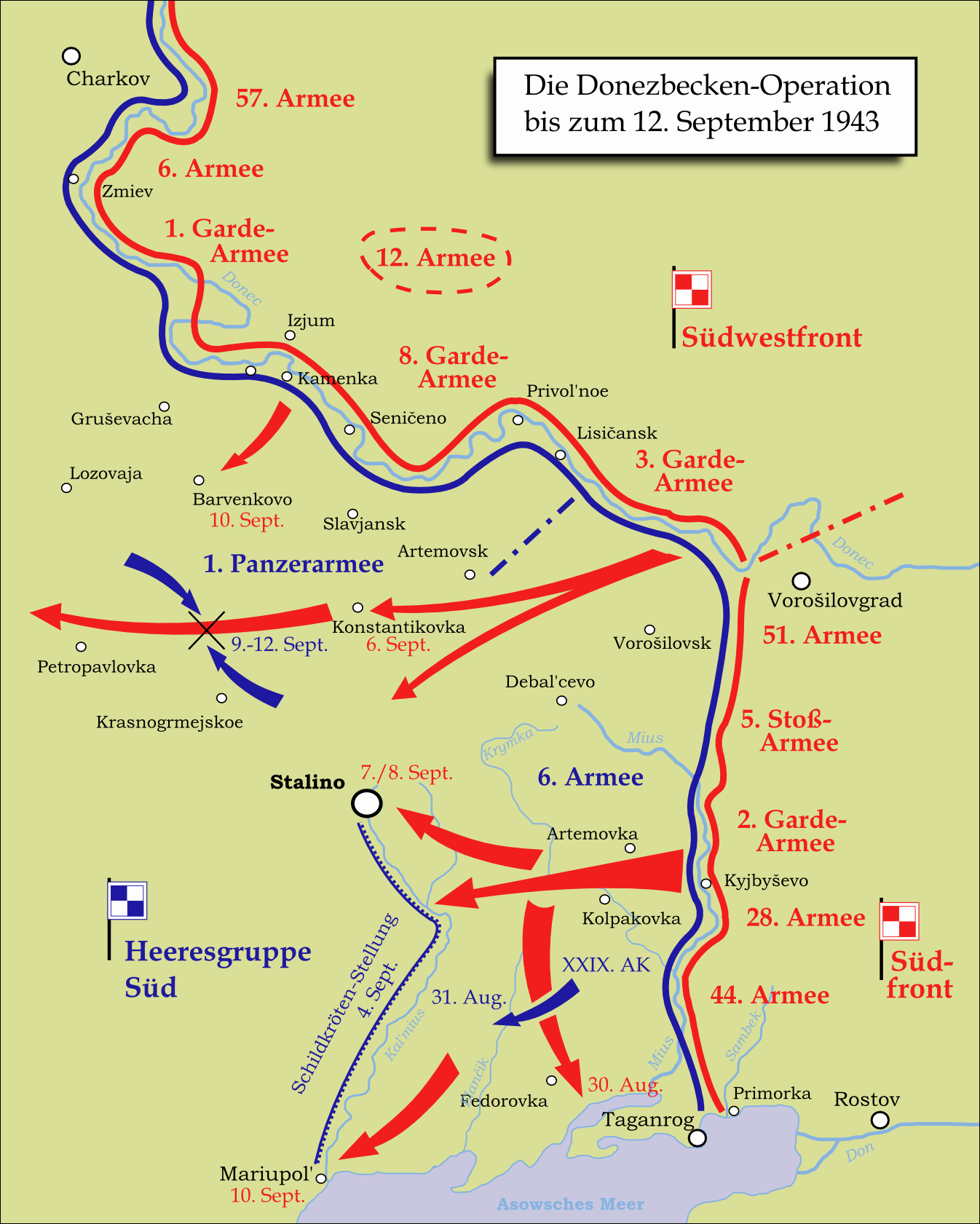
Donbas Offensive, August 1943

The Southwestern and Southern Fronts began the offensive on the morning of July 17, with 28th and 44th Armies striking the Mius line in the Golodayevka area. They faced the German 6th Army, reconstructed since its disaster at Stalingrad. The Soviet forces quickly scored sizeable breakthroughs in an effort to secure the Donbas basin, but were unable to expand their breaches due to the intervention of panzer reserves. By the end of the month the offensive had lost its momentum and 6th Army was soon able to restore most of its front. By the beginning of August the 130th had left 37th Corps and was under direct Army control.

=== Advance to the Dniepr ===
With the failure of the July offensive much of 44th Army's strength was shifted north. Southern Front began its new offensive on August 18, attacking in much the same area but now with 2nd Guards and 5th Shock Armies making up the weight of the force. It began with an overwhelming concentration of artillery fire and before the end of the day the spearheads of 5th Shock had penetrated up to 7km through a 3km-wide gap. 6th Army had no tanks at all, and although Field Marshal E. von Manstein secured the weak 13th Panzer Division on August 20, it was unable to close the gap when it attacked on August 23. On August 27 the 2nd Guards Mechanized Corps turned south out of the breakthrough area and began a dash to the coast behind the German XXIX Army Corps. On the 29th the 2nd Guards reached the sea west of Taganrog and the German corps was pocketed between it and the 28th and 44th Armies. The next day 13th Panzer opened a narrow gap in the line and the 9,000 men of XXIX Corps were able to escape during the night with few losses. On August 31 Hitler authorized a withdrawal to the Kalmius River. By now the division had been awarded a battle honor:

TAGANROG... 130th Rifle Division (Colonel Sychyov, Konstantin Vasilevich)... The troops who participated in the liberation of the Rostov Region and Taganrog, by the order of the Supreme High Command of August 30, 1943, and a commendation in Moscow, are given a salute of 12 artillery salvoes from 124 guns.

As of September 1, 44th Army had only the 130th, the 221st Rifle Division, and the 1st Guards Fortified Region under command as infantry forces. As the advance continued on September 10, the day Mariupol fell, the division was awarded the Order of the Red Banner. Later in the month it returned to 28th Army, still in Southern Front (as of October 20, 4th Ukrainian Front.) During November it was reassigned again, joining the 63rd Rifle Corps of 5th Shock Army in the same Front. This assignment proved brief as by the beginning of 1944 it had been moved to 3rd Guards Army, still in 4th Ukrainian, then back to 5th Shock later in January. By the beginning of March it was part of that Army's 9th Rifle Corps.

=== Bereznegovatoye–Snigirevka Offensive ===
The commander of 3rd Ukrainian Front, Army Gen. R. Ya. Malinovskii, launched a new offensive against 6th Army on March 4. He threw a guards mechanized corps plus the three Guards rifle corps of 8th Guards Army against the German center and soon secured a foothold across the Inhulets River. By the third day the penetration had grown to a depth of 8km, allowing the 4th Guards Mechanized and 4th Guards Cavalry Corps to break loose and push straight through 40km to Novyi Buh, the headquarters 6th Army, causing considerable turmoil. On the night of March 11, Hitler ordered his 6th to end its retreat "at the latest" on the Southern Buh River.

In the second week of the month Malinovskii had enough strength gathered around Novyi Buh to strike due south into the Buh Liman at Mykolaiv and encircle the southern half of 6th Army or carry the offensive west to get across the Buh behind the entire 6th. The fact that he tried to do both ultimately saved the German force. 46th Army, almost entirely infantry, was sent west toward the Buh above Nova Odesa. The splitting of the Soviet forces allowed 6th Army to first fight its way through 8th Guards and then the 46th two days later. In addition, 8th Guards began to suffer supply difficulties, especially for its tanks, which delayed the drive for Mykolaiv. As a result, only three of the 6th Army's divisions had to break out of complete encirclement and by March 21 it had established a solid front on the Buh. Mikolaiv was finally taken on March 28, and for its role in this battle the 130th was awarded the Order of Suvorov, 2nd Degree, on April 1. The day after this victory the division was moved to the Reserve of the Supreme High Command and returned to the 28th Army. While in the Reserve it was assigned to the 128th Rifle Corps, and it would remain under these commands for the duration of the war. Also while in the Reserve the 215th Antitank Battalion gave up its 45mm antitank guns and was reequipped with 12 SU-76 self-propelled guns.

== Operation Bagration ==
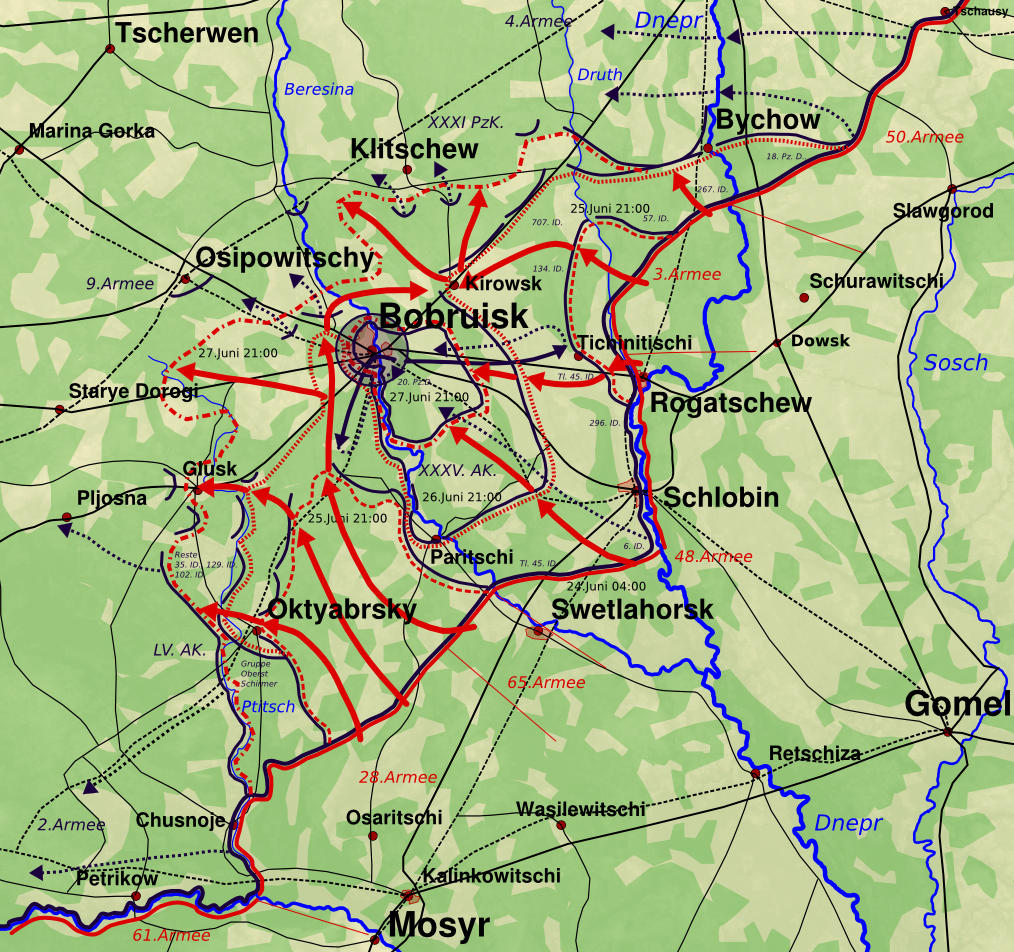
Bobryusk Offensive. Note initial position of 28th Army north of Mazyr.

At the beginning of June the 128th Corps consisted of the 130th, 61st, and 152nd Rifle Divisions. The Corps was under command of Maj. Gen. P. F. Batitskii, a future Marshal of the Soviet Union. When the Army returned to the front on May 28 it joined the center of 1st Belorussian Front, at the corner northwest of Mazyr, linking with the left-flank armies which stretched along the southern margins of the Pripyat Marshes. While those armies would mostly remain inactive in the first weeks the Front commander, Army Gen. K. K. Rokossovskii, assigned the 28th an active role in the initial phase of the summer offensive in support of 65th Army's drive on Babruysk. The Army deployed all three of its corps in the first echelon with 128th Corps on a 4km-wide sector on the left in support of the 3rd Guards and 20th Rifle Corps. It would attack on a sector from Mostki to Yurki toward Grabe with the assistance of the 161st Fortified Region to its left.

=== Bobruysk Offensive ===
During the first two days of the battle the Corps drove back the southern flank of the German 35th Infantry Division and together with elements of 65th Army advanced up to 10km on June 24, forcing the German division back towards the railroad south of Babruysk. On June 25 the 28th Army broke into the lines of the 35th and 129th Infantry Divisions in five places. The 129th Infantry, by now reduced to the size of a regiment, was forced to rotate to the west, leaving a gap on its corps' north flank. 128th Corps, with the 153rd Fortified Region, began to press the 292nd Infantry Division, which received orders at 1600 hours from Army Group to hold and bend back only on its northern flank. Meanwhile, the 18th Rifle Corps of 65th Army was scattering the remnants of 35th Infantry and widening the gap, which was entered by Cavalry Mechanized Group Pliev. 128th Corps and three fortified regions were held up along the Ptsich River on June 27, but the divisions of LV Army Corps were forced to abandon this line late in the day. By the evening of June 28 Pliev's 30th Cavalry Division reached the outskirts of Slutsk, as the rifle divisions of 28th Army were making their best speed to keep up with the advance of the mobile group. By June 30 German reinforcements were arriving, including elements of the 4th Panzer Division at Baranavichy which were sent to block the road to Slutsk. From June 22 to July 3 the 28th Army and the Pliev Group had forced a German retreat of 250km to the vicinity of Stowbtsy, but the advance now paused to bring up supplies to overcome the increasing resistance. On July 23 the 130th would receive the unusual award of the Order of Lenin for its part in the liberation of the Minsk region.

During the fighting across the Ptsich two captains of the 130th distinguished themselves sufficiently to become Heroes of the Soviet Union. Shalva Ilyich Chilachava was in command of a company of the 371st Rifle Regiment and had already, on the first day of the offensive, led his troops through swampy terrain to break German defenses near the village of Rog in the Aktsyabrski district, personally killing 13 defenders. During June 28 he forced a crossing of the Ptsich and seized a bridgehead at about the same time that Grigorii Petrovich Yerofeev was leading his battalion of the 664th Rifle Regiment in doing the same at the village of Zatishie. Once across, the battalion accounted for several hundred German casualties, while also capturing 25 artillery pieces and nine prime movers. Yerofeev was wounded in the battle but stayed with his unit. On August 23 both men were awarded the Gold Star. They survived the war, with Chilachava dying in his birthplace of Zugdidi, Georgia, in 1988, and Yerofeev dying in 1999 at Krasnoyarsk.

=== Baranovichi-Slonim Operation ===
Resistance along the Baranavichy axis grew on July 4 as reinforcements continued to arrive, including the remainder of 4th Panzer, units of 12th Panzer Division that had broken through from Minsk, and the 1st Hungarian Cavalry Division moving up from Pinsk. 28th Army reached a line from Minkeviche to Kletsk to Rybaki. At this time Baranavichy was garrisoned by the 52nd Special Designation Security Division, a panzer battalion and three assault gun brigades. A defensive line was already being prepared along the Shchara River based on the town of Slonim. The Front was ordered, under STAVKA operational directive no. 220127, to immediately resume its advance on Baranavichy and subsequently to Brest with the 48th, 65th and 28th Armies; however the 28th was stretched out over a 25km line of march and was still 12km from its designated attack sector.

The Army commander, Lt. Gen. A. A. Luchinskii, directed his forces to outflank Baranavichy from the south on July 5, and by evening had liberated Lyakhavichy. Intensive fighting for Baranavichy took place on July 6–7. The line along the Shchara was penetrated but the Army advanced only a few kilometres. By the end of the second day the town was partially encircled but the Soviet advance was slowed by German reinforcements and continuing difficulties in bringing the Front's forces up to the attack sectors. Overnight the 65th Army, assisted by the 28th, stormed Baranavichy in an unexpected night attack which cleared it by 0400 hours on July 8 as the German forces withdrew to the west. By the end of the day the Army had advanced as far as Hantsavichy.

=== Lublin–Brest Offensive ===
The 28th Army continued making its main offensive in the direction of Kosava and Smolyanitsa and by July 13 had reached the Yaselda River along its entire front. At this point it encountered much stiffer resistance from the newly arrived 102nd Infantry Division and the 5th Hungarian Reserve Division. It fell to the 1st Mechanized Corps to pierce this line and allow the advance to continue.

The operation to liberate Brest began on July 17. The Front's main attack would be made by its left-flank armies with the right-flank forces in support; 28th Army on the right with 61st Army and the Pliev Group were to outflank the city from the north and northwest, encircle and capture it. The attack began with a 15-20 minute artillery preparation. 28th Army, with the Pliev Group, directed their advances towards Kamyenyets, and by the end of the day had covered 25km. After beating off numerous German counterattacks the next day the Army forced the Lesnaya River east of Dmitrovichi and linked up with 61st Army. From July 19 Army Group Center began heavy counterattacks against the Army and the Pliev Group in order to continue its hold on Brest, and these would continue until the 21st. The commitment of 20th Rifle Corps from second echelon in the direction of the railroad to Brest along the Army's left flank during the second half of July 20 allowed the offensive to gain momentum and the German forces began to withdraw towards the city. During July 25–26 the Army forced the Lesnaya north of Czernawczyci and General Rokossovskii handed over his reserve 46th Rifle Corps to help complete the encirclement. This was done on July 27 and beginning after midnight on the 28th the Army drove into the fortified zone from the north, throwing off counterattacks, and linked up with 9th Guards Rifle Corps of 61st Army and the main forces of 70th Army. The city was cleared later that day. In recognition for its part in this victory the 371st Rifle Regiment (Lt. Colonel Itkulov, Kurban Abdulovich) was awarded its name as a battle honor.

== Into Germany ==
On September 14 the 130th again entered the Reserve of the Supreme High Command along with the rest of 28th Army and redeployed to the border of East Prussia where it joined 3rd Belorussian Front on October 13. On October 21 the Army was committed to the Goldap-Gumbinnen operation but its advance was halted near Ebenrode by German counterattacks. Following this the Front began preparations for the winter offensive into Poland and Germany. As of January 1, 1945, the 128th Corps still had the same three divisions under command.

=== East Prussian Offensives ===
In the planning for the Vistula-Oder Offensive the Front organized its shock group into two echelons with the 39th, 5th and 28th Armies in the first, backed by the 11th Guards Army and two tank corps. The 28th Army had its main forces on its right flank and was to launch a vigorous attack north of the Ebenrode–Gumbinnen paved highway in the general direction of Insterburg. Its breakthrough frontage was 7km wide and its immediate objective was to destroy the Gumbinnen group of German forces in conjunction with 5th Army before assisting 11th Guards in its deployment along the Inster River. The Army deployed a total of 1,527 guns and mortars on this frontage with the 3rd Guards Corps, which was to launch the main attack, given the largest allocation.

3rd Belorussian Front began its part of the offensive on the morning of January 13. The Army, mainly facing the 549th Volksgrenadier Division, broke through the defense along the Kischen–Grunhaus sector and penetrated as much as 7km by the day's end while fighting off 14 counterattacks by infantry and tanks. On the next three days the advance slowed considerably as the German forces continued to cover the routes to Gumbinnen. By now it was apparent to the Front commander, Army Gen. I. D. Chernyakhovskii, that the breakthrough would not come on this sector and he moved his second echelon to the 39th Army's front. On January 19 the Army began to advance more successfully. General Luchinskii concentrated the maximum amount of artillery fire in support of the 3rd Guards and 128th Corps allowing a breakthrough on a narrow sector towards the northeastern outskirts of Gumbinnen. Meanwhile, 20th Corps reached the town from the south, but the German grouping continued to resist and the Army's units were forced to consolidate. During a two-day battle on January 20–21 the 20th and 128th Corps finally captured Gumbinnen. A stubborn battle for Insterburg followed the next day. For their contributions to the capture of Gumbinnen the 371st Rifle and 363rd Artillery Regiments would both be awarded the Order of the Red Banner on February 19.

A large remnant of the German forces managed to retreat to the Angerapp River, which the 28th Army reached by the end of January 22. By 2300 hours on January 23 it became apparent that the German forces facing the Army were in retreat to the west. Over the next two days the Army advanced up to 35km and reached a line from Kortmedin to Gerdauen by the end of the 26th, less than 70km southeast of Königsberg. The 128th and 3rd Guards Corps took Gerdauen overnight on January 27/28 while the remainder of the Army advanced to the Alle River where it was halted by heavy fire from a well-established defensive line along the west bank. It was now clear that Königsberg would soon be isolated. During the fighting along the Alle on January 30, General Sychyov was seriously wounded and hospitalized. He never returned to the front, but did extensive service postwar in the field of military history and research before retiring in July 1967. He was replaced on February 1 by Col. Constantin Stepanovich Popov, who would lead the division into peacetime.

==== Heiligenbeil Pocket ====
After six weeks of almost continuous fighting, by the beginning of March the divisions of 3rd Belorussian Front were significantly understrength. Despite this the Front ordered a new operation to eliminate the remaining German forces southwest of the Königsberg fortified zone. The new offensive began on March 13, with 28th Army attacking in the direction of Bladiau, which was taken on March 15. During the night of March 25/26 the Army, in cooperation with 31st Army, stormed the town of Rosenberg and advanced towards Balga, capturing 6,200 soldiers, 25 tanks and 220 guns of various calibres. Immediately after the operation ended on March 29 the 28th was again transferred to the Reserve of the Supreme High Command and began moving across eastern Germany towards the Oder River. On April 26 the 371st Regiment would be awarded the Order of Kutuzov, 3rd Degree, for the capture of Heiligenbeil itself.

=== Berlin Operation ===
By April 20 the 130th had arrived in the 1st Ukrainian Front. The battle for the Oder and Neisse Rivers began on April 16 but 28th Army's leading divisions did not arrive at the front and begin combat operations until April 22. The next day the 130th and 152nd were committed from reserve to complete the ring of encirclement around German 9th Army and were soon fighting along a line from Tornow to Ragow, facing east. By day's end only one route, the Neumuhle–Buckow road, connected 9th Army with Berlin, and it was under Soviet artillery fire. The inner encirclement ring was completed on April 25 when the 152nd joined hands at noon with 3rd Army's 2nd Guards Cavalry Corps in the area of Rotzis and Brusendorf.

During April 26 the 130th and 152nd remained on a line from Lübben to Krausnick to outside Teupitz, containing the trapped German forces, which were confined to an area not more than 900km^{2}. The next day breakout attempts continued, particularly in the Halbe area. Much of this fell on the 3rd Guards Corps. On April 28 the division remained on a line from Teupitz to outside Mosen, facing east, as the 152nd moved toward Berlin. The 130th was set to follow the next day, but was redirected to Neuendorf in order to attack the north flank of the final German breakthrough group, fighting between that place and Zeig, facing south. In the end about 25,000 German soldiers managed to link up with 12th Army.

== Postwar ==
When the shooting stopped the men and women of the division shared the full title of 130th Rifle, Taganrog, Order of Lenin, Order of the Red Banner, Order of Suvorov Division. (Russian: 130-я стрелковая Таганрогская ордена Ленина Краснознамённая ордена Суворова дивизия.) Shortly after this the division began moving back to Soviet territory. In July, Colonel Popov left the division to take up several positions in the educational establishment. As of July 1, 1946, it was still in 128th Corps, which was now part of 3rd Army in Byelorussian Military District. It was at Slonim on February 18, 1947, when it was disbanded with the rest of the Corps.
