= Mariya Polivanova =

Soviet sniper (1922–1942)

- Мария Семёновна Поливанова
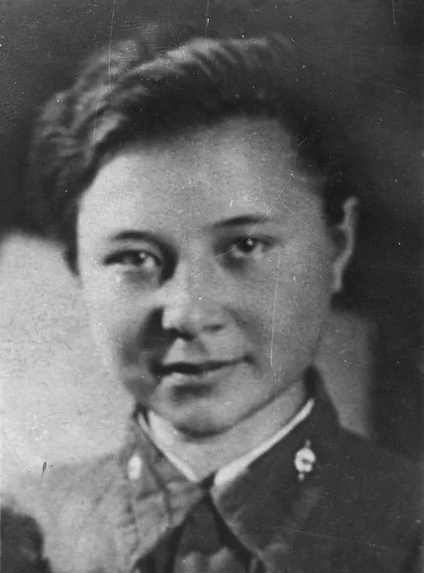
- Polivanova in 1941 or 1942
- Born: 24 October 1922; Naryshkino, Tula Governorate, Russian SFSR
- Died: 14 August 1942 (aged 19); Sutoki, Parfinsky District, Russian SFSR, Soviet Union
- Military career
- Allegiance: Soviet Union
- Branch: Infantry
- Service years: 1941–1942
- Rank: Private
- Unit: 528th Rifle Regiment
- Conflicts: World War II; Eastern Front †
- Awards: Hero of the Soviet Union

Mariya Semyonovna Polivanova (Russian: Мария Семёновна Поливанова; 24 October 1922 – 14 August 1942) was a Soviet sniper during World War II. She was killed in action together with Natalya Kovshova on 14 August 1942, and was posthumously awarded the title of Hero of the Soviet Union on 14 February 1943.

== Civilian life ==
Polivanova was born on 24 October 1922 to a working-class Russian family in Naryshkino village. After graduating from her eighth grade of school in Spas-Konino she headed a reading room on a collective farm. After moving to the village of Novye Gorki (located in present-day Korolyov, Moscow Oblast) she worked at an order desk in a factory. In January 1940 she worked as a secretary in the welding department of the National Institute of Aviation Technologies in Moscow. Simultaneously she attended night school in hopes of gaining admission to the Moscow Aviation Institute.

== Military career ==
Polivanova joined the Red Army in June 1941 after Germany attacked the Soviet Union. Initially tasked with night watch on a roof as an observer, she later underwent sniper training, which she graduated from in August. In October she volunteered for the 3rd Moscow Communist Rifle Division, a Narodnoe Opolcheniye group to defend Moscow from German bombing attacks. In January 1942, 3rd Communist became the 130th Rifle Division and she became part of its 528th Rifle Regiment on the Northwestern Front, where she met Natalya Kovshova. Both Polivanova and Kovshova established themselves as skilled snipers and respected instructors in the battalion.

In February 1942, Polivanova was sent to the front, fighting for control of Novaya Russa. In doing so the unit was able to disable enemy machine-gun setups and positions. In the battle of Rutchevo, under heavy enemy fire she managed to carry many wounded soldiers from her unit to safety. Some time between March and May 1942 she was wounded in battle and taken to a field hospital, where Kovshova was sent only two days later.

On 14 August 1942 near Sutoki-Byakovo, Polivanova and Kovshova were surrounded by German troops after running out of ammunition. The pair killed themselves and caused Germans casualties with grenades. They were posthumously awarded the title of Hero of the Soviet Union on 14 February 1943 for exemplary service, courage and heroism.

== Awards and recognition ==
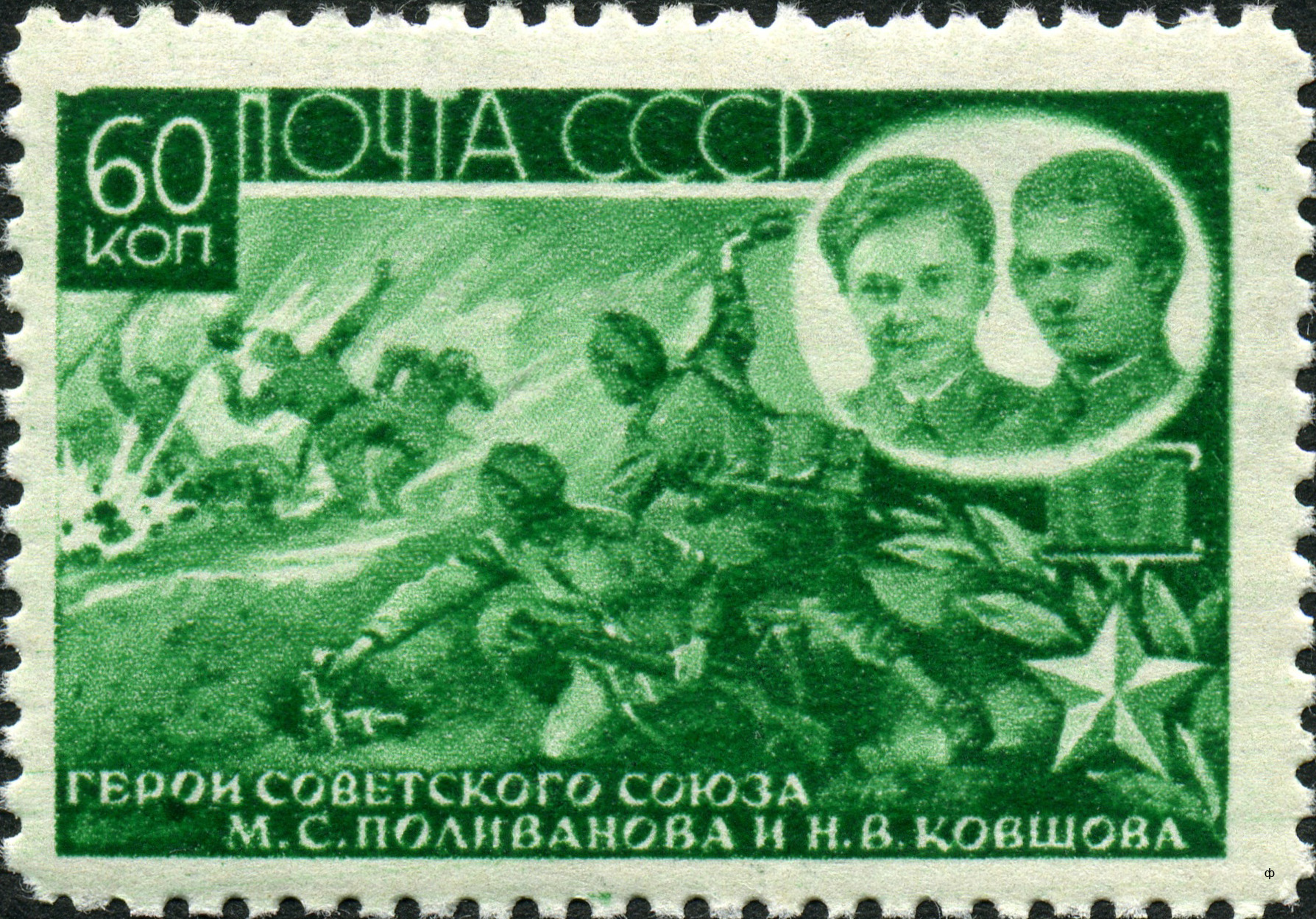
1944 Soviet postage stamp depicting Polivanova and Kovshova's last stand

=== Awards ===
- Hero of the Soviet Union
- Order of Lenin
- Order of the Red Star

=== Memorials and commemoration ===
- A 1944 Soviet postage stamp (pictured) depicts Polivanova and Kovshova in their last stand.
- There are streets bearing her name in Aleksin, Maryovo, Moscow, Sevastopol, Surgut, and Zaluchye.

== See also ==
- List of female Heroes of the Soviet Union
- List of last stands
- Natalya Kovshova
- Valeriya Gnarovskaya
