= 2006 Soviet war documents declassification =

In 2006, the Russian Ministry of Defence declassified about a hundred pages of archived documents concerning Soviet preparedness for the German invasion on 22 June 1941 at the Eastern Front of World War II. On 22 June 2017 the Ministry published them online on a subdomain of its official website, stating that they had never been published before. The documents from the early 1950s were authored by Soviet military commanders of various ranks at the request of a fact-finding panel. The online publication was made on the 76th anniversary of Operation Barbarossa.

== Background ==
The documents coming from the Central Archive of the Russian Ministry of Defence were written mostly by seven Soviet military commanders (Pyotr Sobennikov, Pavel Abramidze, Mikhail Zashibalov, Nikolai Ivanov, Ivan Bagramian, Boris Fomin and Kuzma Derevyanko) at the request of the fact-finding panel of the Military History Department of the General Staff of the Soviet Army. Headed by Colonel General Alexander Pokrovsky, the panel was formed in 1952 and put five questions about the preparedness of the Baltic, Kiev and Belorussian military districts. The questions concerned the receipt of the border defence plan by the Soviet troops, the deployment of covering forces on the state border, the receipt of the order on combat readiness, the reason why the majority of Soviet artillery units were in training camps and the preparedness of the unit staffs for troops management. The questions were addressed to persons who on the eve of Operation Barbarossa held high-ranking military positions, down to division and corps commanders. At that time, Sobennikov was the commander of the 8th Army of the Baltic Military District staff. Abramidze was the commander of the 72nd Rifle Division of the 26th Army. Zashibalov was the commander of the 86th Rifle Division of the 10th Army. Ivanov was the chief of staff of the Kiev Military District's 6th Army. Bagramian was the chief of operations staff of the Kiev Military District. Fomin was the chief of operations staff of the 12th Army. Derevyanko was deputy chief of the intelligence department of the Baltic Military District staff. The documents were mostly published as scans of the typewritten originals.

== Contents ==
The documents generally indicate that the Soviet high command underestimated the German threat and ignored the information about the impending invasion. Derevyanko, in particular, wrote that two or three months before the invasion the command and staff of the Baltic Military District had reliable information about Germany's strengthening and preparation for the war. Noting that he repeatedly notified the command of the German buildup in the border regions, Derevyanko wrote that his impression was "that the military district command underestimated the impending threat and distrusted a lot of intelligence data". According to Derevyanko, in early June 1941 the district's staff started to receive information about the timing of German invasion. Three to four days before the invasion the informations contained not only the precise date, but also the estimated time of the invasion.

Ivanov wrote that Germans exploited the Soviet "carelessness, complacency and hope that Germans will do nothing serious, confining themselves to provocations". He notes that "despite the obvious signs of a large concentration of German troops, the commander of the Kiev Military District forbade the deployment of covering forces, as well as bringing troops into combat readiness, especially strengthening them even after the shelling of the state border and air raids" began.

Bagramian wrote that the General Staff forbade the early deployment of covering forces in order "not to provoke the war". This was also confirmed by Abramidze who noted that covering forces were deployed only after the German invasion.

Sobennikov noted that he refused to execute an order he had received on the night of 22 June to withdraw the troops from the state border and his men stayed on positions. He also stated that almost all aircraft of the Baltic Military District were burned down by Germans on airfields.

At the same time, most commanders wrote that they had been strengthening the border up until the German invasion. The official position taken by the Russian Ministry of Defense is that "by not issuing an order on full combat readiness the country's leadership did not want to provoke Hitler and incite a war in extremely unfavorable conditions for us, hoping to delay the war".
