= Natalya Kovshova =

Soviet sniper (1920–1942)

- Наталья Венедиктовна Ковшова
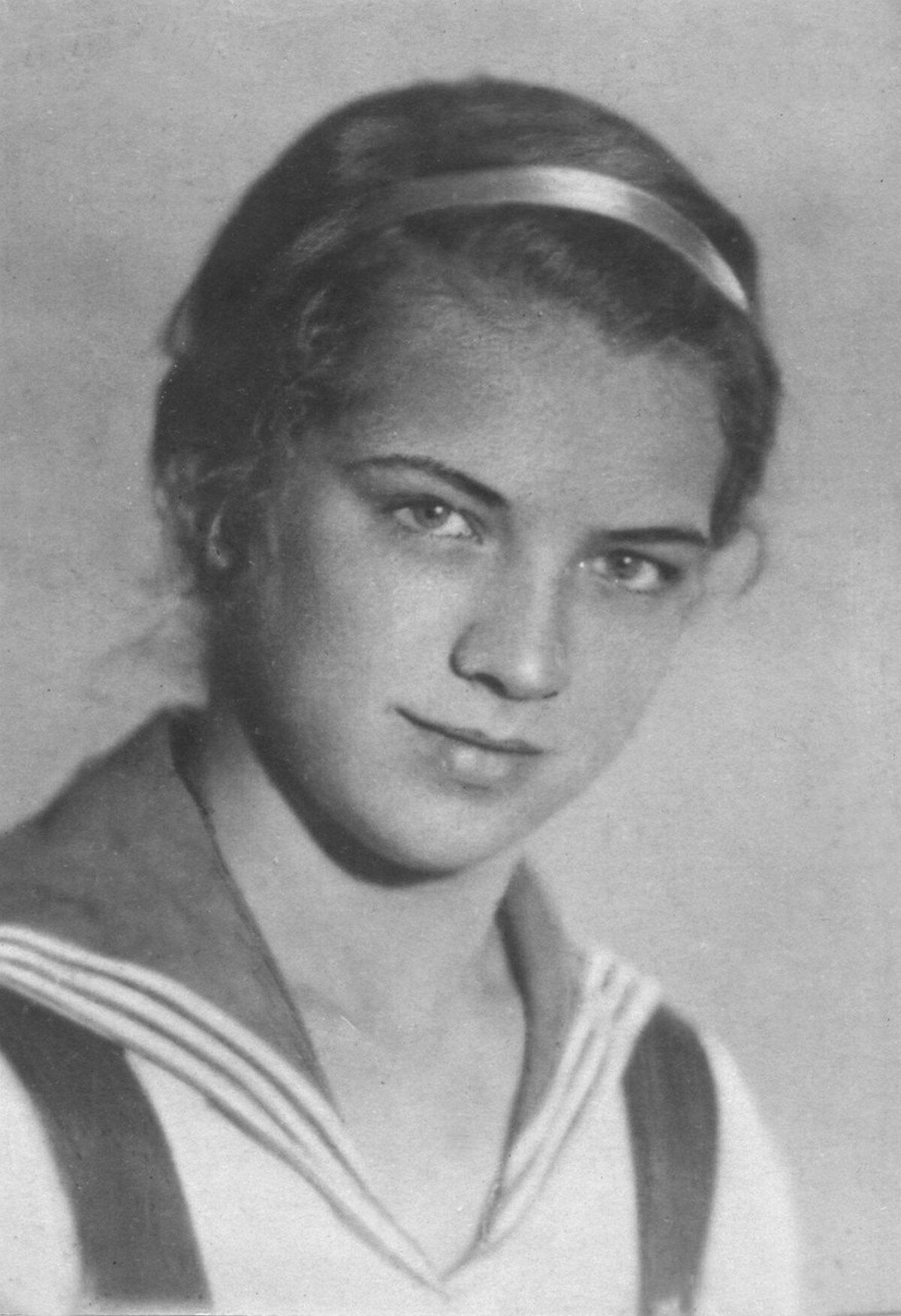
- Born: 26 November 1920; Ufa, Russian SFSR
- Died: 14 August 1942 (aged 21); Sutoki, Parfinsky District, Russian SFSR, Soviet Union
- Military career
- Allegiance: Soviet Union
- Branch: Infantry
- Service years: 1941–1942
- Rank: Private
- Unit: 528th Rifle Regiment
- Conflicts: World War II; Eastern Front †
- Awards: Hero of the Soviet Union

Natalya Venediktovna Kovshova (Russian: Наталья Венедиктовна Ковшова; 26 November 1920 – 14 August 1942) was a Soviet female sniper who fought in World War II.

She fought with her friend Mariya Polivanova who acted as her spotter. Natalya fought bravely throughout the war; she was killed fighting German Wehrmacht forces near Novgorod in August 1942. She was posthumously awarded the title Hero of the Soviet Union, the Soviet Union's highest award for bravery, on 14 February 1943.

== Early life ==
Natalya Kovshova was born on 26 November 1920 in Ufa, modern-day capital of the Republic of Bashkortostan in Russia. Shortly after her birth, her family moved to Moscow. She was educated at a high school in Moscow. After graduating from high school, Kovshova began work at a Moscow research institute while waiting to be accepted into a university of aviation. She met a girl named Mariya Polivanova while in the institute; the two became good friends.

== World War II ==
When the German-Soviet War began in 1941, Kovshova joined a Narodnoe Opolcheniye (self-defence) unit in Moscow with Polivanova at age 21. These self-defense groups were started when German Luftwaffe aircraft began to bomb Russian cities and towns. Kovshova was put in charge of the observation and communication department. She spent many nights in the control tower. After her experience at the self-defense group, Kovshova attended sniper training in the 2nd Worker's Regiment of the 3rd Moscow Communist Rifle Division. After her training had been completed, in January 1942 the division was redesignated as the 130th Rifle Division, and she was sent to the front with the now-528th Rifle Regiment.

During that month Kovshova and Polivanova, who had joined the same regiment shortly after Kovshova, began fighting the German forces on the Northwestern Front. Both women established themselves as the Regiment's resident snipers. Kovshova was the shooter in the two-women sniper team, and Polivanova acted as the spotter. They both fought in the Battle of Moscow when the 528th Rifle Regiment were sent to help defend Russia's capital. During the battle, Kovshova proved to be an expert sniper, killing many German soldiers. She also dug numerous anti-tank emplacements, machine gun nests, and infantry trenches during the defense. She took the job of training new soldiers how to use the rifles. She also trained the best students to become snipers, teaching them marksmanship early; passing on her shooting skills. For her actions in the battle of Moscow, Kovshova was awarded the Order of the Red Star.

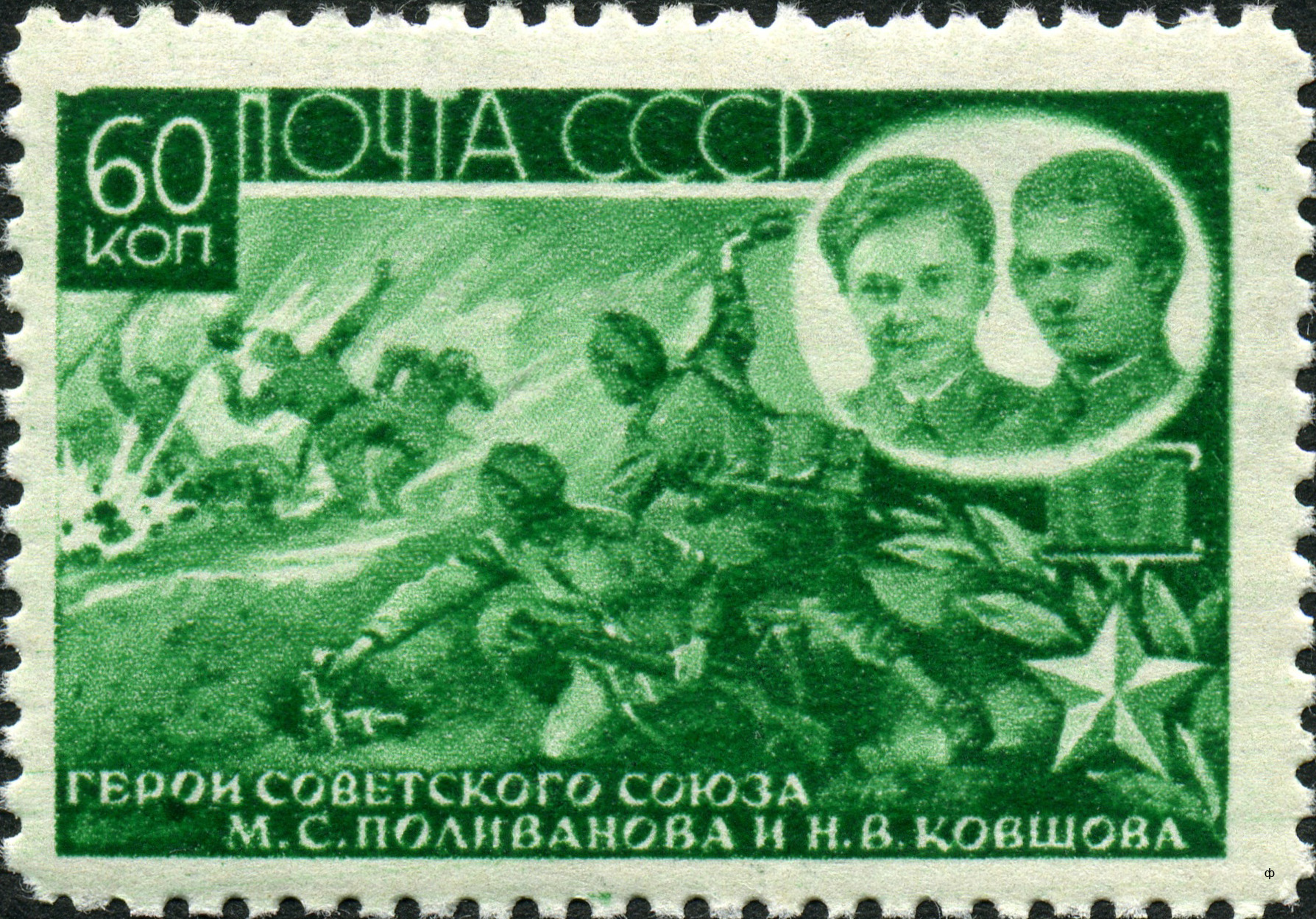
1944 Soviet postage stamp depicting Polivanova and Kovshova

Kovshova expressed great hatred of the Germans during the war. She was inspired by the Soviet propaganda explaining how the Soviet soldiers were fighting for the liberation of the Motherland. She wrote to her mother in 1942: "You can hear horrible stories from local residents who have been in the hands of the fascist pigs. The women we live with had a guest come to visit said that the Germans shot her brother and four of her friends simply because they went outside after 4pm." Natalya found great delight in killing German soldiers. She wrote to her mother on 7 July 1942: "My dearest Mama!" "Please don't be angry that I didn't write to you about being wounded. But I didn't want to worry you for no reason, since nothing serious happened..." "I've been back with my unit 2nd June 1942. Now Mashenka [Mariya] and I are working with the young snipers. Their statistics are looking good. In the last two weeks of June our students took down 3 Fritzes. Not bad!"... "A few days ago five of us went on reconnaissance without saying anything to the company commander. We were right under the German's very noses and they had no clue!"

On 14 August 1942, Kovshova's regiment was committed to the fighting near the village of Sutoki-Byakovo in the Novgorod Oblast. The machine gunners and snipers resisted the German offensive in trenches. The Soviet soldiers were killed one after another, until only Kovshova and Polivanova remained, both wounded. As being captured was not an option, Kovshova decided to pull the pin of her grenade, and wait to blow the German soldiers up when they reached the trench. When the Germans finally reached the trench, Kovshova detonated the grenades, killing herself and Polivanova and possibly wounding and/or killing several German soldiers. She was posthumously awarded the Hero of the Soviet Union shortly after, in recognition of her sacrifice. It is estimated that Kovshova and Polivanova together killed over 300 German soldiers.

A Soviet fishing factory trawler was christened Natalya Kovshova in the 1960s.

== See also ==
- List of female Heroes of the Soviet Union
- List of last stands
- Mariya Polivanova
- Aliya Moldagulova
- Valeriya Gnarovskaya
