= Valeriya Gnarovskaya =

Heroine of the Soviet Union

Valeriya Osipovna Gnarovskaya
- Валерия Осиповна Гнаровская
- Born: 18 October 1923; Modolitsy, Petrograd Governorate, Russian SFSR, Soviet Union
- Died: 23 September 1943 (aged 19); Vilniansk Raion, Zaporizhia Oblast, Reichskommissariat Ukraine
- Military career
- Allegiance: Soviet Union
- Branch: Infantry
- Service years: 1942–1943
- Rank: Private
- Unit: 907th Rifle Regiment
- Conflicts: World War II
- Awards: Hero of the Soviet Union

Valeriya Osipovna Gnarovskaya (Russian: Вале́рия О́сиповна Гнаро́вская; 18 October 1923 – 23 September 1943) was a combat medic in the 907th Rifle Regiment who fought on the Stalingrad Front in World War II. On 23 September 1943, when a German tank broke through the Soviet line of defence where she was treating wounded soldiers, she threw herself under the tank with a bag of grenades, killing herself but repulsing the German counterattack. She was posthumously awarded the title Hero of the Soviet Union on 3 June 1944.

== Civilian life ==
Valeriya was born on 18 October 1923 to a Russian family in the village of Modolitsy in the Petrograd Governorate. Her father was a postmaster and her mother worked as a housekeeper. In 1924 the family moved to Bardovskoye, Podporozhsky, in the Leningrad region, where she attended primary school. After graduating from secondary school she joined the Komsomol and intended to join a mining institute. After the start of the Second World War her father was drafted into the military in July 1941 and her mother took over the management of the post office.

In September 1941 the approach of Axis troops in Operation Barbarossa put Podporozhsky and other districts surrounding Leningrad in the front line of the conflict. The female members of the Gnarovskaya family – Valeriya, her grandmother, mother, and sister – were evacuated to Omsk in Siberia and then to the city of Berdyuzhye, where Valeriya and her mother worked in telecommunications.

After sending repeated petitions to be allowed to join the ranks of the military on the front lines, Valeriya and several fellow members of the Komsomol finally presented themselves at a recruiting station on 10 April 1942, were permitted to enroll in the 229th Infantry Division, and were sent to complete brief medical courses.

== Military career ==
In July 1942 the unit was sent to the Stalingrad front where she evacuated wounded soldiers from the battlefield. Facing heavy enemy fire she would carry the injured to safety, often having to bear a weapon for protection in close quarters. On July 26 enemy forces broke through the Soviet infantry's line of defense and crossed the Chir River, but the unit continued to fight to prevent the Axis from reaching a railroad. On July 31 her unit, with 112th Infantry Division, tanks, and air support, initiated a counteroffensive and forced the Axis soldiers to retreat behind the Chir river.

For over two weeks the unit engaged in nonstop battle, in which she was on medic duty where she contracted typhoid fever. Soldiers carried her, barely alive, to a hospital, and she was considered missing in action. After recovering she was sent back to battle on the 3rd Ukrainian Front. After intense battle between 15–22 August after carrying 30 wounded to safety she sustained a severe concussion but soon returned to battle. After the concussion she reported in a letter to her mother that she could not hear well after the event.

In a battle near the river of Seversky Donets she carried 47 wounded soldiers, officers, and their weapons from the battlefield and personally killed 28 German soldiers in action. Throughout her career she saved an estimated 338 wounded soldiers.

In her last battle, which took place on 23 September 1943 near the village of Gnarovsky, then named Ivanenka, as part of the 907th Rifle Regiment she rescued the wounded from the front lines and took them to the hospital tent; she also killed 47 German soldiers in action. When two German Tiger I tanks broke past defensive lines and approached the medical station, seeing the tanks approaching, Gnarovskaya grabbed a satchel of grenades, threw herself under the tank and detonated them, killing herself and destroying one of the approaching tanks. Soviet soldiers managed to overwhelm and destroy the second tank and defended the medical station. At the cost of her life the German attack was repulsed and the mission was completed. After the battle villagers found the remains of her body and buried her. One year later her remains were reburied with full military honors. For her heroism in battle she was posthumously awarded the title Hero of the Soviet Union on 3 June 1944 by Decree of the Presidium of the Supreme Soviet of the USSR, and the village of Ivanenka where she died was renamed Gnarovsky.

== Awards ==
- Hero of the Soviet Union
- Order of Lenin
- Medal "For Courage"

== See also ==
- List of female Heroes of the Soviet Union
- Natalya Kovshova
- Mariya Polivanova
