= Nova Odesa =

City in Mykolaiv Oblast, Ukraine

Nova Odesa Нова Одеса
- City
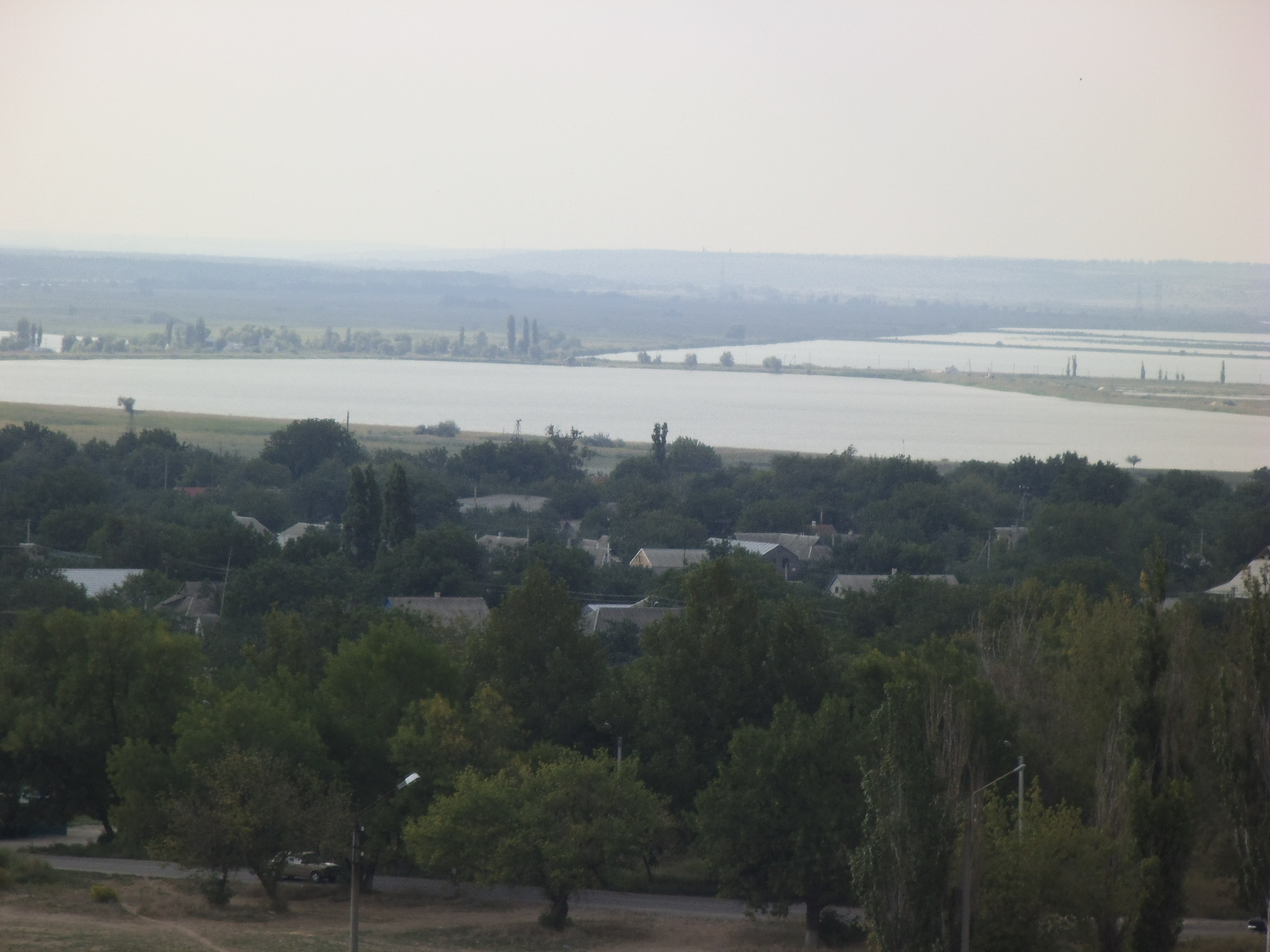

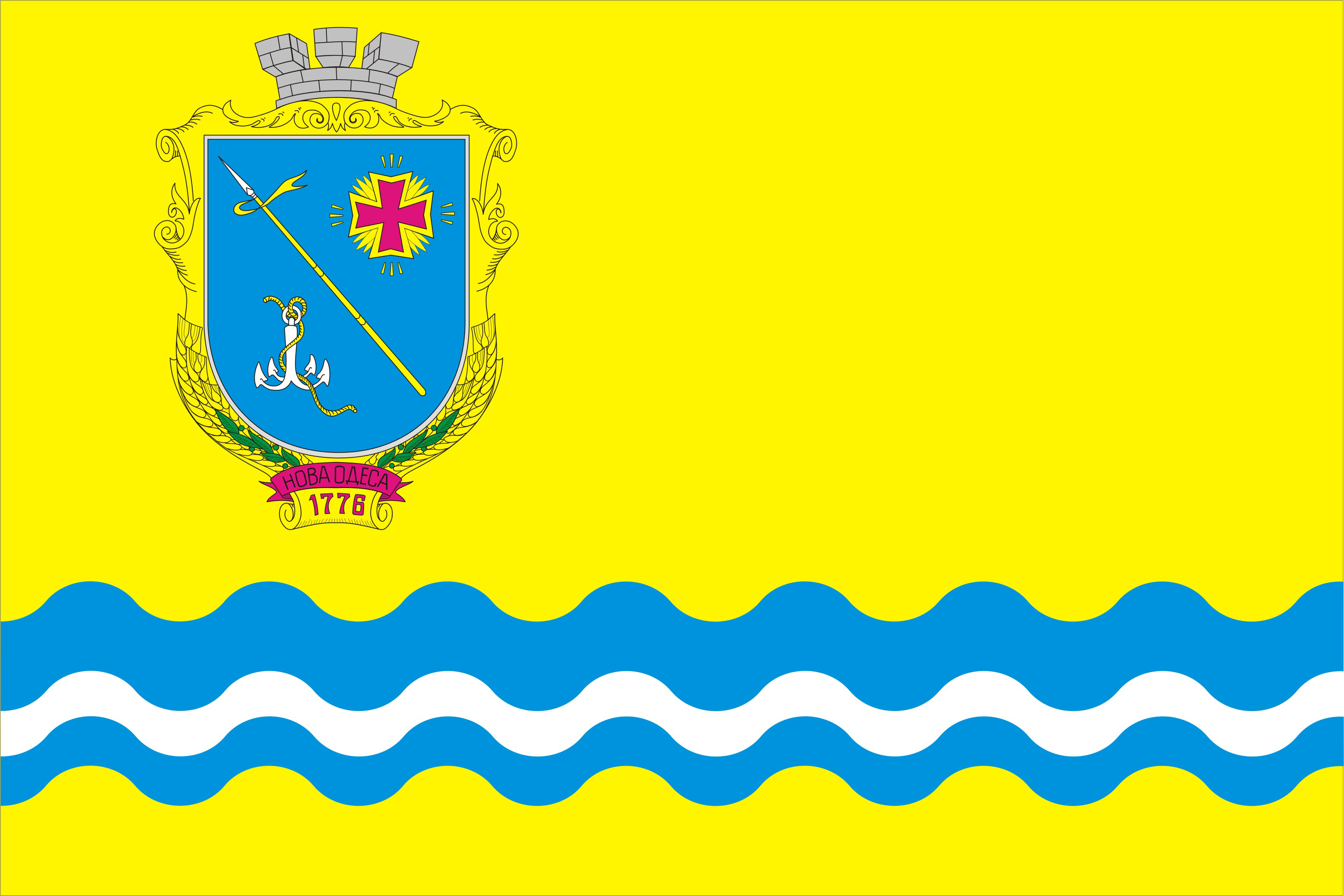
- Flag
- Interactive map of Nova Odesa
- Location of Nova Odesa Nova Odesa (Mykolaiv Oblast)
- Coordinates: 47°18′35″N 31°46′45″E
- Country: Ukraine
- Oblast: Mykolaiv Oblast
- Raion: Mykolaiv Raion
- Hromada: Nova Odesa urban hromada
- Founded: 1776
- City rights: 1976

Government
  - Mayor: Oleksandr Polyakov

Area
  - Total: 20.65 km^{2} (7.97 sq mi)
- Elevation: 15 m (49 ft)

Population (2022)
  - Total: 11,510
  - Estimate (2024): 12,000
  - Density: 557.4/km^{2} (1,444/sq mi)
- Postal code: 55600-56608
- Area code: +380-5167

Nova Odesa (Ukrainian: Нова Одеса, pronounced [noˈwɑ oˈdɛsɐ], lit. 'New Odesa') is a small city in Mykolaiv Raion, Mykolaiv Oblast (region) of southern Ukraine. It hosts the administration of Nova Odesa urban hromada, one of the hromadas of Ukraine. The population of Nova Odesa is 11,510 (2022 estimate).

Until 18 July 2020, Nova Odesa was the administrative center of Nova Odesa Raion. In July 2020, as part of the administrative reform of Ukraine, which reduced the number of raions of Mykolaiv Oblast to four, Nova Odesa Raion was merged into Mykolaiv Raion.

== Demographics ==
As of the 2001 Ukrainian census, the town had a population of 14,073 inhabitants. The ethnic and linguistic composition was as follows:

Ethnic groups in Nova Odesa
	percent
Ukrainians	93.29%
Russians	4.75%
Armenians	0.53%
Belarusians	0.40%
Moldovans	0.39%
Bulgarians	0.08%

Native languages in Nova Odesa
	percent
Ukrainian	94.1%
Russian	4.9%
Armenian	0.4%
Moldovan (Romanian)	0.2%
Belarusian	0.1%
others	0.1%

== Gallery ==
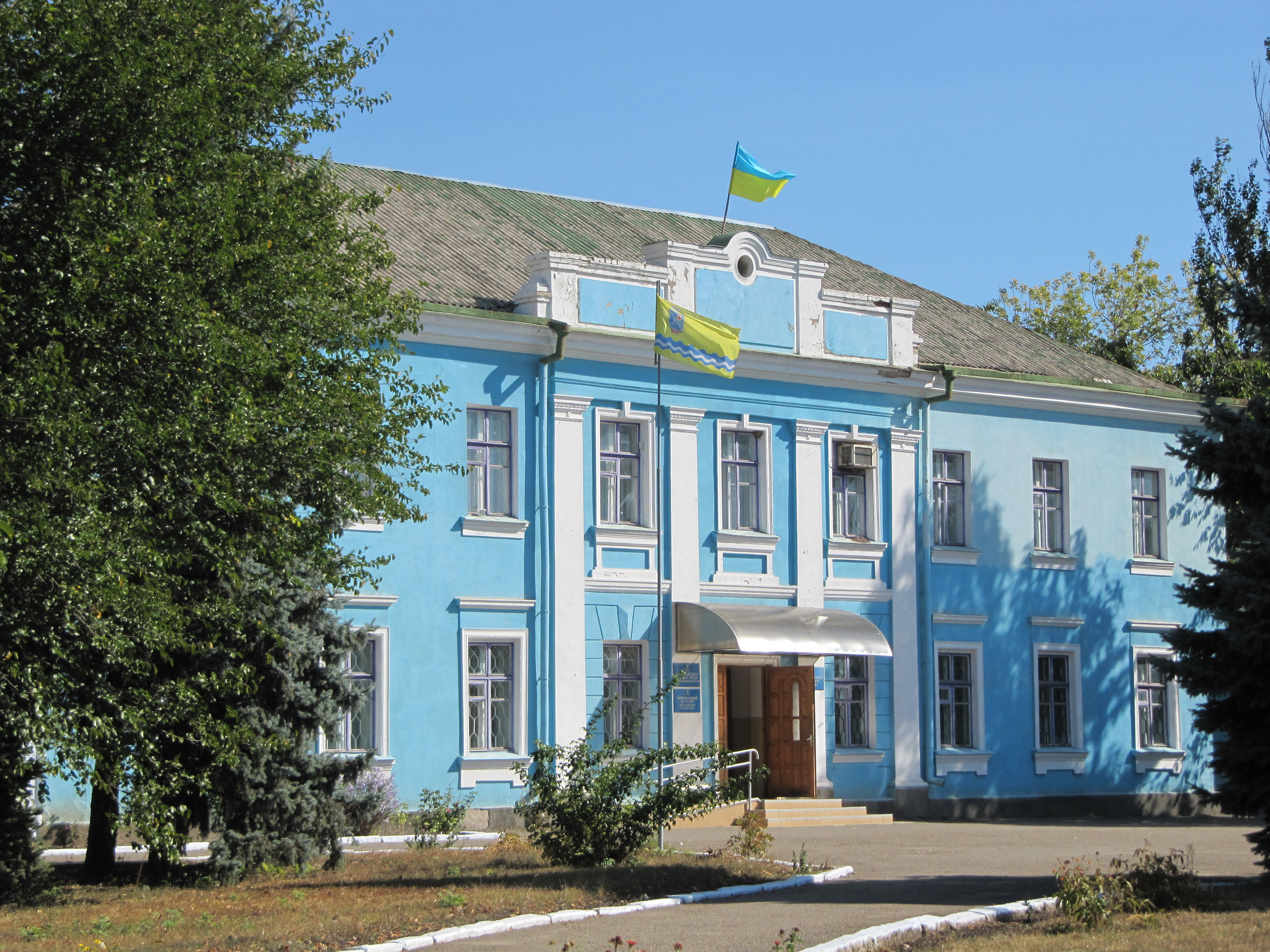
City hall

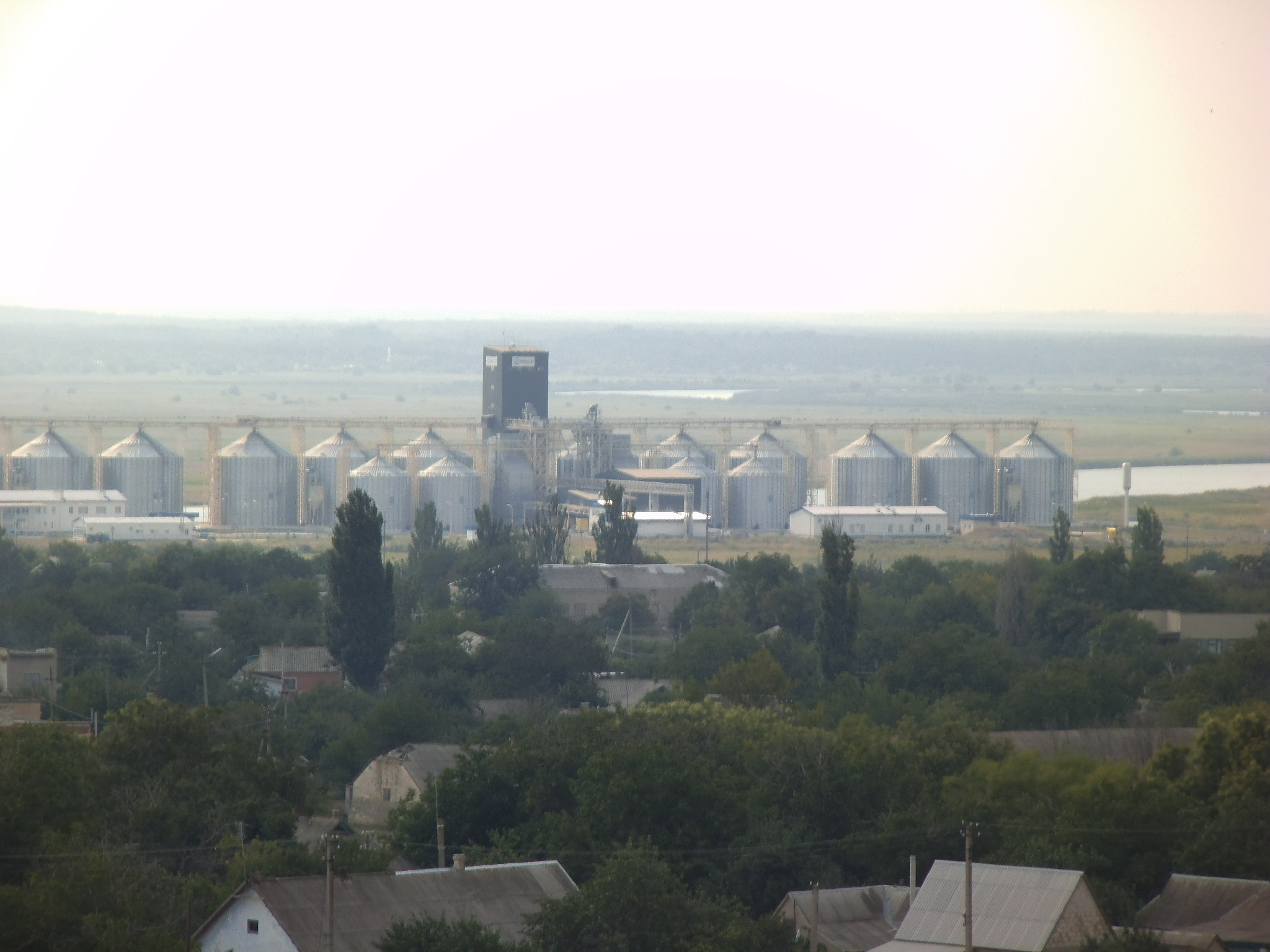
Grain storage facilities

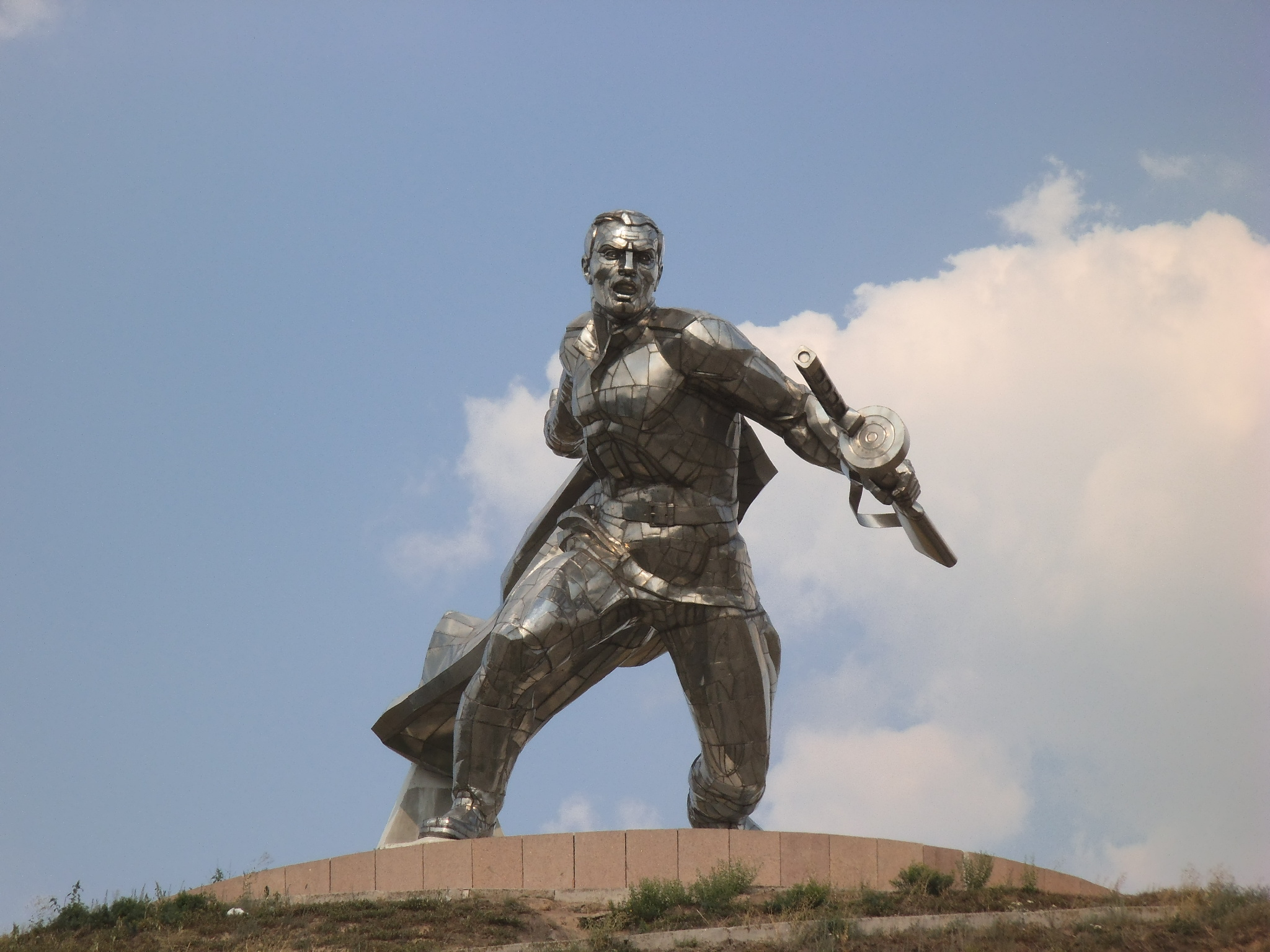
World War II memorial

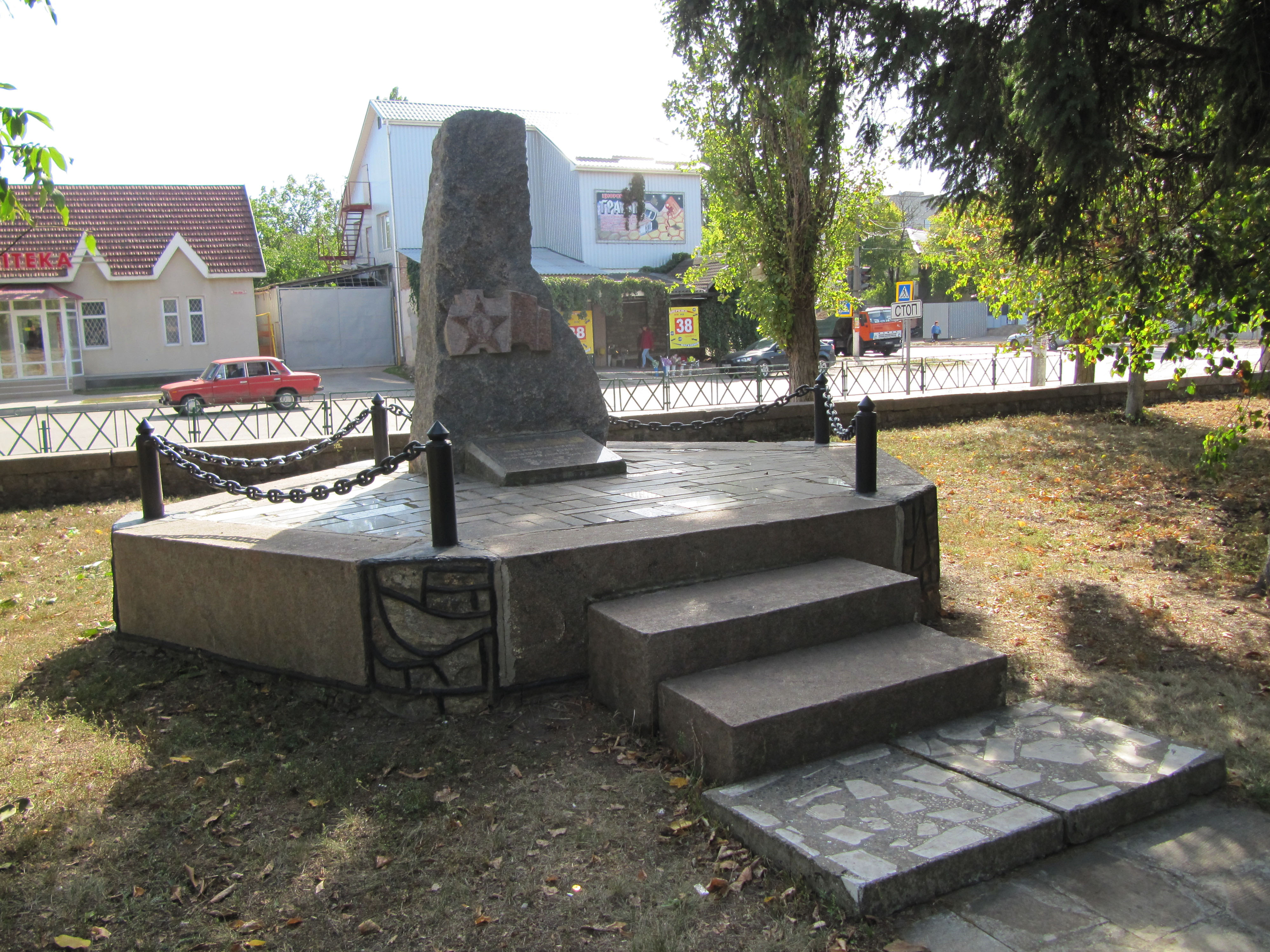
Soviet–Afghan War memorial

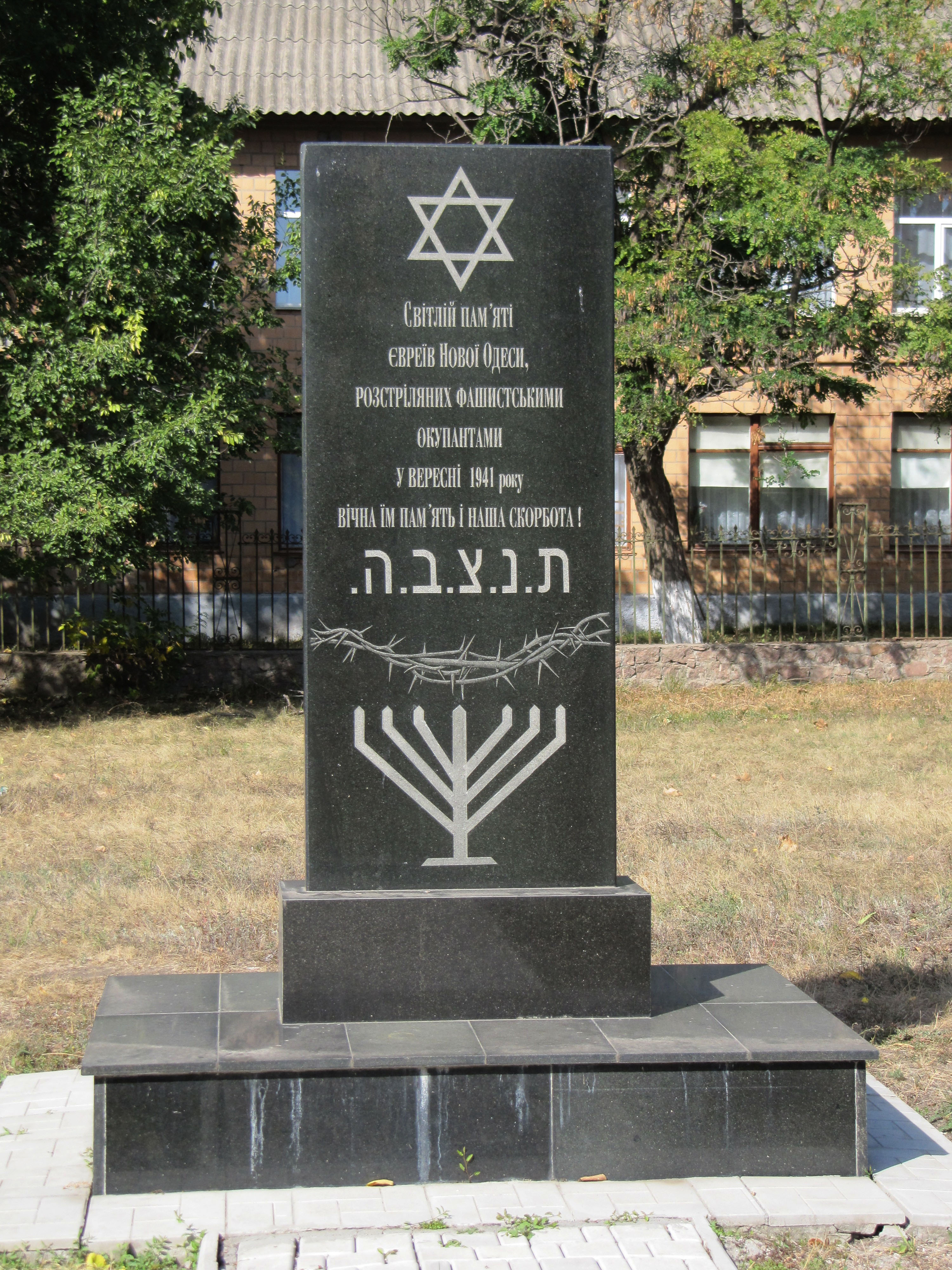
Holocaust memorial
