= Pavle Abramidze =

Soviet military officer (1901–1989)

- Abramidze, 1956
- Born: 19 March 1901; Vani, Kutais Governorate, Russian Empire
- Died: 3 April 1989 (aged 88) Tbilisi, Georgian SSR, Soviet Union
- Allegiance: Soviet Union
- Branch: Red Army (Soviet Army from 1946)
- Service years: 1923–1956
- Rank: Major general
- Commands: 187th Rifle Division; 130th Rifle Division; 72nd Rifle Division (became 72nd Mountain Rifle Division)
- Conflicts: August Uprising; World War II

Pavle Abramidze (Georgian: პავლე აბრამიძე; Russian: Павел Ивлианович Абрамидзе; 19 March 1901 – 3 April 1989) was a Georgian military officer and a Major General in the Soviet army. He was promoted to major general in 1940 and distinguished himself during World War II. he commanded the 72nd Mountain Rifle Division during the Battle of Uman. He was taken prisoner by the German Wehrmacht in August 1941 and remained in captivity until May 1945, when he was repatriated to the Soviet Union. After the war, he became chief of the military department at the Tbilisi Physical Culture Institute and later served in the same position at the Georgian Agricultural Institute from May 1947 and the Tbilisi State University from October 1949. After being retired for health reasons in 1956, Abramidze lived in Tbilisi until his death in 1989.

== Early life and prewar service ==
Abramidze was born to a peasant family on 19 March 1901 in Vani, Kutais Governorate and graduated from the village school in 1914. After working in Baku for two years, he returned to Vani to work on his father's farm.

Conscripted into the Red Army on 27 April 1923, he was sent to the Separate Artillery Battalion of the Georgian Rifle Division at Tbilisi. In October he was sent to become an officer cadet at the Georgian Combined Military School, and while there participated in the suppression of the August Uprising and anti-Soviet rebels with a cadet detachment that included students from the school. After his graduation in September 1926, Abramidze was sent to the 5th Caucasian Red Banner Regiment of the 2nd Caucasian Rifle Division at Baku, where he served as a platoon commander in the regimental school. Following his completion of the Tbilisi Machine Gun Command Course during October and November 1930, he resumed his previous position with his regiment, later becoming a company commander, acting chief of the regimental ammunition store, and chief of staff and commander of the regimental training battalion.

Appointed commander and commissar of the 6th Caucasian Rifle Regiment of the 2nd Caucasian Rifle Division, now stationed in the Ukrainian Military District, in October 1934, Abramidze became assistant commander of the 99th Rifle Division at Tulchyn in April 1938. He commanded the 187th Rifle Division from September 1939 and in November transferred to command the 130th Rifle Division at Mogilev-Podolsky, being promoted to kombrig on 4 November. While with the 187th Abramidze participated in the Soviet invasion of Poland. He was appointed commander of the 72nd Rifle Division in January 1940 and led it in the Winter War. During the latter, his division became part of the 15th Army and fought in attempts to relieve the Soviet troops in the Lemetti pocket. For his courage, Abramidze was awarded the Order of the Red Banner, being promoted to major general on 4 June 1940 when the Red Army introduced general officer ranks. After the end of the war the 72nd was relocated to Dobromil, where it was reorganized as a mountain rifle division in early 1941.

== World War II ==
After Operation Barbarossa began, Abramidze led the division as part of the 26th Army in defensive battles in the Vinnytsia sector, and in July it joined the 8th Rifle Corps of the 12th Army for the Battle of Uman. He was captured along with many other high-ranking Soviet officers on 8 August 1941 in the area of Podvysokoye, southeast of Uman. Abramidze was imprisoned at Zamość, Hammelburg, Nuremberg, and Weißenburg castle. He was liberated by Allied troops on 29 April 1945. On 27 May, he was repatriated to the Soviet Union, where he was arrested, but soon cleared of charges.

== Postwar ==
Reinstated in the Red Army and placed at the disposal of the Personnel Directorate on 31 December, Abramidze completed the Improvement Course for Rifle Division Commanders at the Frunze Military Academy between March 1946 and January 1947. He then became chief of the military department at the Tbilisi Physical Culture Institute and later served in the same position at the Georgian Agricultural Institute from May 1947 and the Tbilisi State University from October 1949. After being retired for health reasons on 2 August 1956, Abramidze lived in Tbilisi until his death there on 3 April 1989.
