= Narodnoe Opolcheniye =

Irregular militia in Russia and the Soviet Union

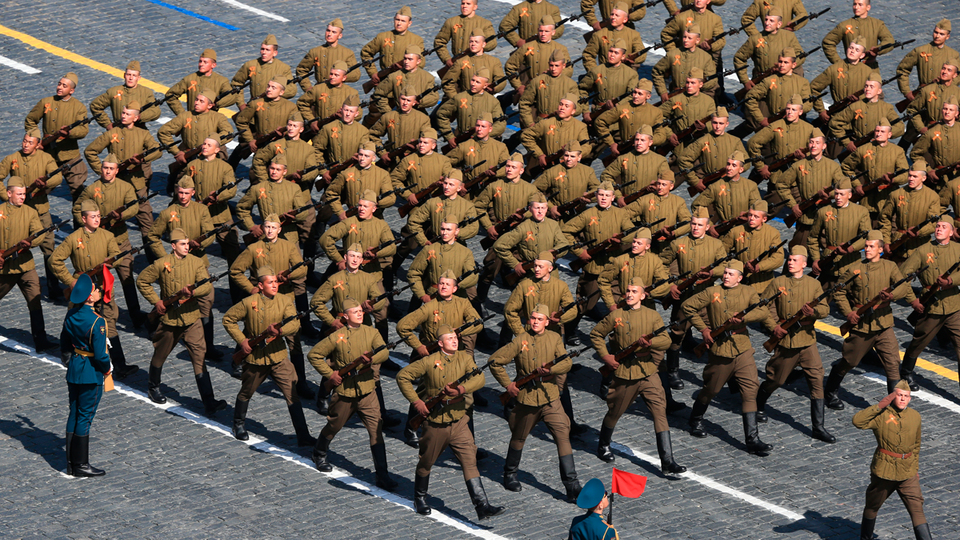
Reenactors dressed in the uniforms of the World War II-era People's Militia during the 2015 Moscow Victory Day Parade.

The People's Militia (Russian: Народное ополчение, romanized: Narodnoe opolcheniye, lit. 'popular regimentation', IPA: [nɐˈrodnəjə ɐpɐlˈtɕenʲɪjə]) was the irregular troops formed from the population in the Russian Empire and later the Soviet Union. They fought behind front lines and alongside the regular army during several wars throughout its history.

The People's Militia is of the type known as "national troops" such as German Landwehr, and although often translated as the "people's militia", "home guard", "people-in-arms", or "national popular army", its members never belonged to an organised military force, but were in all cases selectively accepted from a body of volunteers during a national emergency.

The People's Militia features prominently in early Russian history, for example in The Tale of Igor's Campaign when it refers to the entire force led on a campaign. It was used for political purposes when the Grand Duchy of Moscow assumed the leading role in the 16th-century Russia. It sought to emphasise the tsar as the "father" of all of Russians, which included other principalities which sought to remain independent. Before the unification of Russians under the leadership of Moscow, each city and town had its own Opolcheniye not named Narodnoe, but named after the city or town, so Novgorodskoye Opolcheniye, Suzdalskoye Opolcheniye, Vladimirskoye Opolcheniye, etc. These were not militia as such, but armed crowds that, when attacked, would arm themselves and gather into a polk, which is translated in its modern meaning as a regiment. Dal' gives other usages such as rat', voisko, opolcheniye, tolpa and vataga.

== Before 19th century ==
=== Time of Trouble ===
Although formed into regiments, divisions and even armies during their existence, the Opolcheniye never had their own permanent units, and it was only during their last creation in 1941 that they were transferred to the regular units and formations en masse.

- First Narodnoe Opolcheniye, was formed in 1611 during the Russo-Polish War of 1605–1618.
- Second Narodnoe Opolcheniye, was formed in 1611–1612 during the Russo-Polish War of 1605–1618.

=== Saint Petersburg militia ===
In response to Napoleon's invasion, St. Petersburg raised over 16,000 men, mainly volunteers. These men were all apart of the Saint Petersburg militia (Russian: Санкт-Петербуржское ополчение). Unlike regular troops, they were recognized for wearing distinctive green uniforms with brass cross symbols on their forage caps.

== 19th and 20th century ==
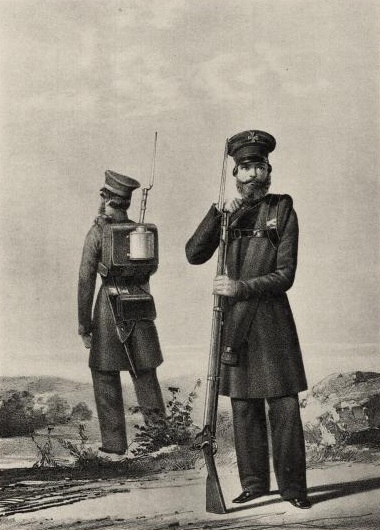
Russian Riflemen from Vologda and Olonets Governorates, 1812

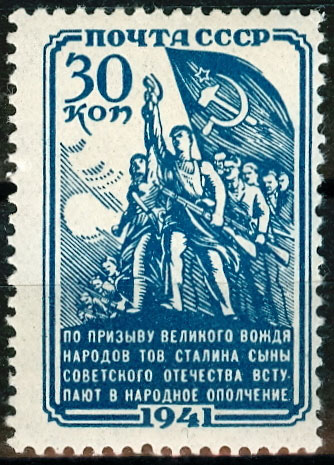
1941 postage stamp: the text reads, "At the call of the great leader of the peoples, Comrade Stalin, the sons of the Soviet fatherland join the Narodnoe Opolcheniye."

- During the War of the Fourth Coalition (1806–1807), the Narodnoe Opolcheniye was raise numbering some 612,000, but not used in combat.
- In 1812 Narodnoe Opolcheniye of 420,000 was formed during the French invasion of Russia and was used extensively during the war and into the 1813 campaigns. At this time the Cossack opolcheniye was also created that even included use of captured 18th- or even 17th -century Turkish cannon kept as trophies.
- During the Crimean War (1853–1856), a new Narodnoe Opolcheniye numbering about 360,000 was called out, but not used in combat, although the 7,132 members of the Morskoye Opolcheniye formed from former naval and merchant officers and seamen did serve on active duty.
- During the reign of Alexander II of Russia from 1874 a Gosudarstvennoye Opolcheniye was created which existed until 1917. The primary organisational intent of the government was to offer administrative framework for the previously spontaneous creation of opolcheniye formations due to the ending of serfdom a decade earlier, and the increasing Socialist revolutionary activities. It was used in Siberia during the Russo-Japanese War.
- The Narodnoe Opolcheniye was formed again in 1941 during the Great Patriotic War in significant numbers. Sixteen divisions were formed in Moscow. Eighteen were formed in Leningrad, of which five became regular rifle divisions.

== See also ==
- List of infantry divisions of the Soviet Union 1917–1957#People's Militia
- Home Guard (United Kingdom)
- Landsturm

== Sources ==
- Stephen Summerfield, Brazen Cross of Courage: Russian Opolchenie, Partizans and Freikorps During the Napoleonic Wars, Partizan Press, 2007 ISBN 1-85818-555-6
- Roger Chickering, Stig Förster, Bernd Greiner, A World at Total War: Global Conflict and the Politics of Destruction, 1937-1945, German Historical Institute, Cambridge University Press, 2005 ISBN 0-511-08213-4
- Kirschenbaum, Lisa, The Legacy of the Siege of Leningrad, 1941-1995: Myth, Memories, and Monuments, Cambridge University Press, 2006 ISBN 0-521-86326-0
- Russian Peasant Volunteers at the Beginning of the Crimean War, David Moon, Slavic Review, Vol. 51, No. 4, Winter, 1992
- Glantz, David, Colossus Reborn: The Red Army at War, 1941-1943, University Press of Kansas, 2005 ISBN 0-7006-1353-6
- Dahl, Vladimir, Explanatory Dictionary of the Live Great Russian language, Vol.III (П), Diamant, St. Petersburg, 1998 (reprinting of 1882 edition by M.O.Wolf Publisher Booksellers-Typesetters)
