= Robert Brichenok =

Robert Ivanovich Brichenok
- Роберт Иванович Бриченок
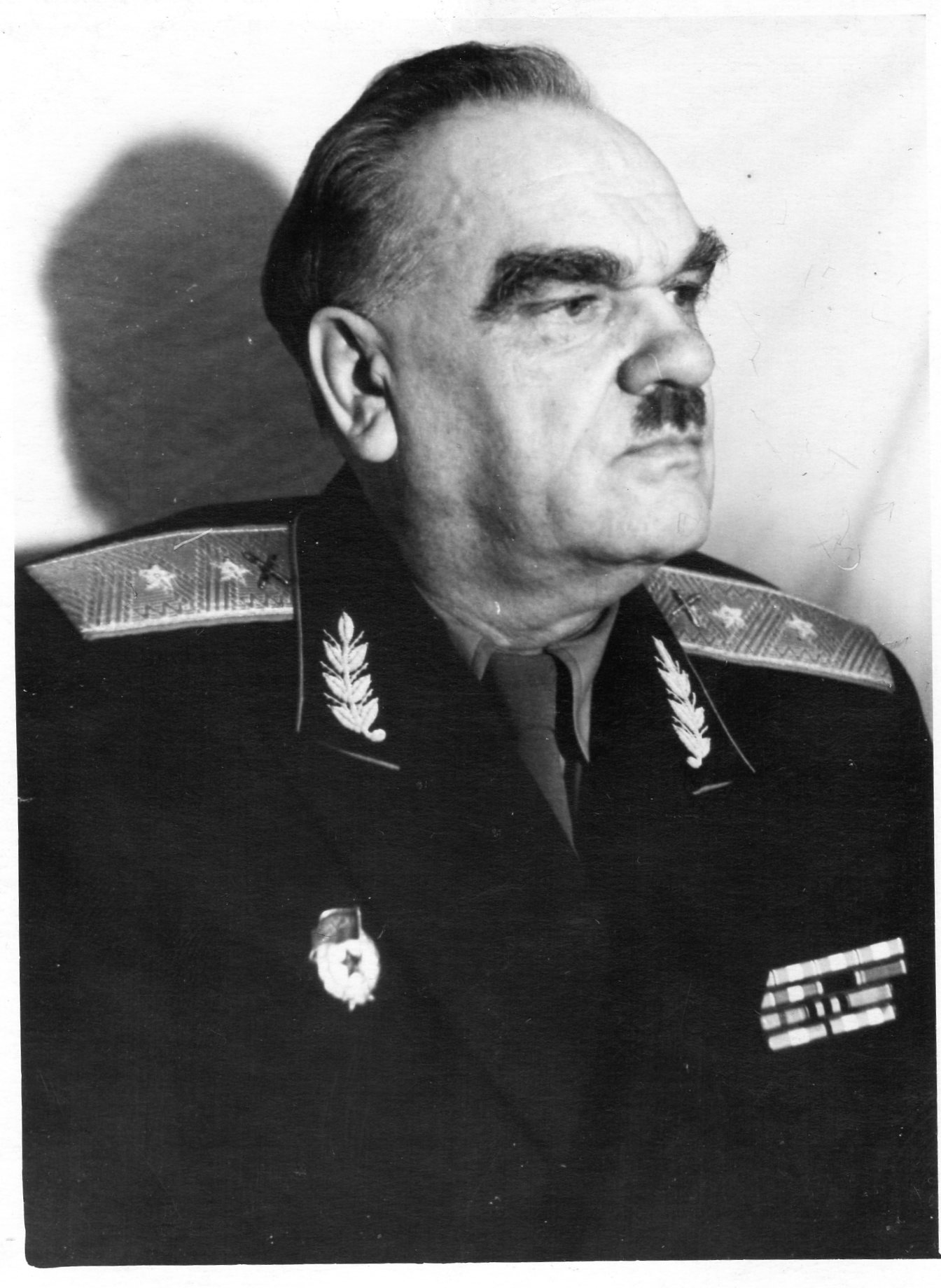
- Born: January 17, 1893; Saint-Petersburg, Russian Empire
- Died: February 5, 1972 (aged 79); Leningrad, RSFSR, USSR
- Military career
- Allegiance: Russian Empire→ Soviet Union
- Branch: (Russian Empire) cavalry (Soviet Union) artillery
- Service years: 1915 – 1953
- Rank: Lieutenant general
- Conflicts: World War I; Russian Civil War; Polish–Soviet War; World War II; Winter War; Eastern Front
- Other work: painter

Signature
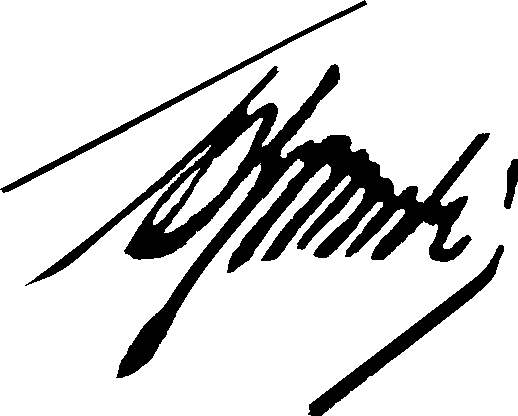

Robert Ivanovich Brichenok (Russian: Роберт Иванович Бриченок Belarusian: Роберт Іванавіч Брычонак 17 January – 5 February 1972) was a Soviet artillery lieutenant general. He took part in World War I, Russian Civil War, Winter War and World War II.

== Gallery ==
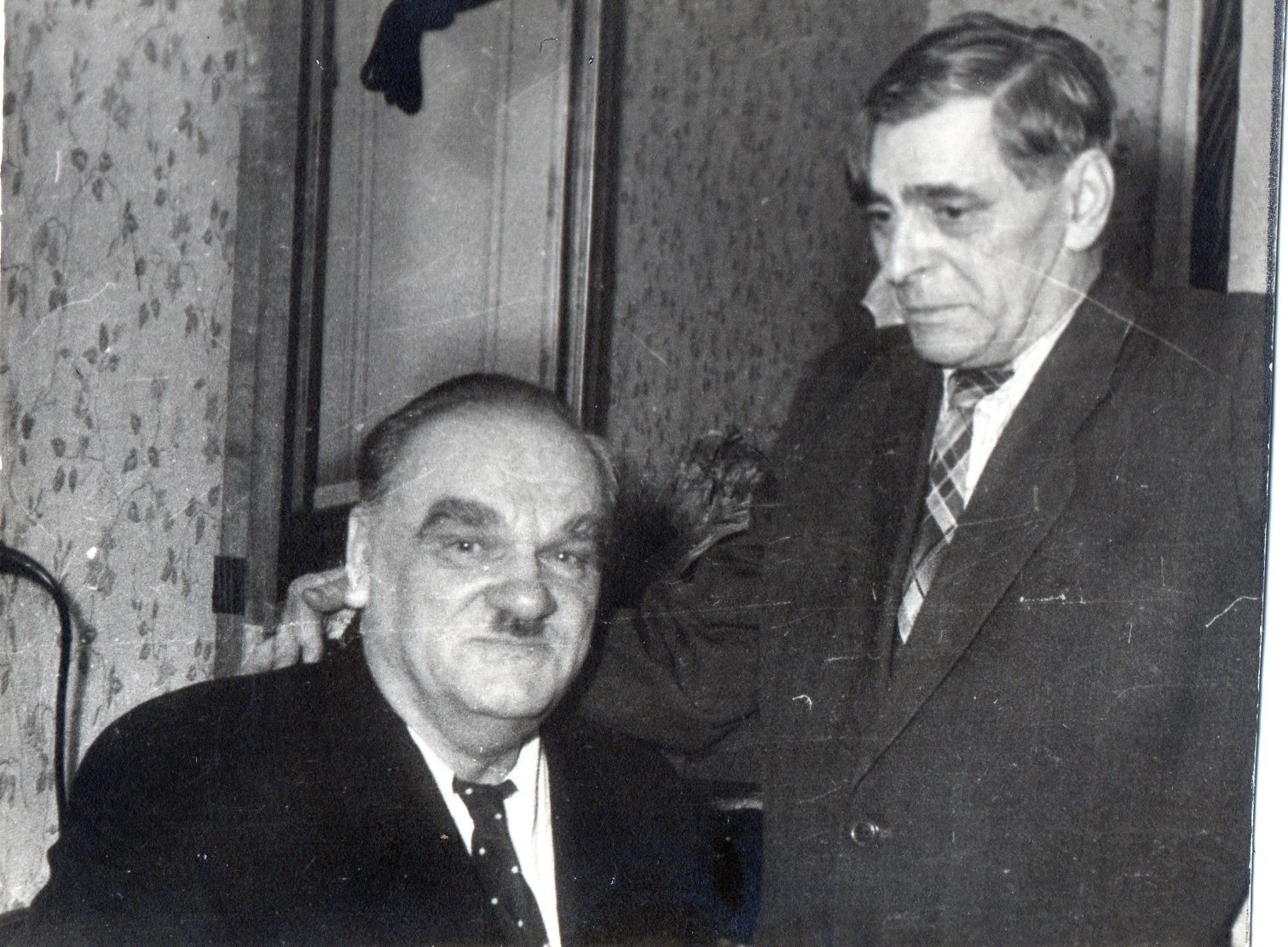
With counter admiral Philipp Bulykin (right)

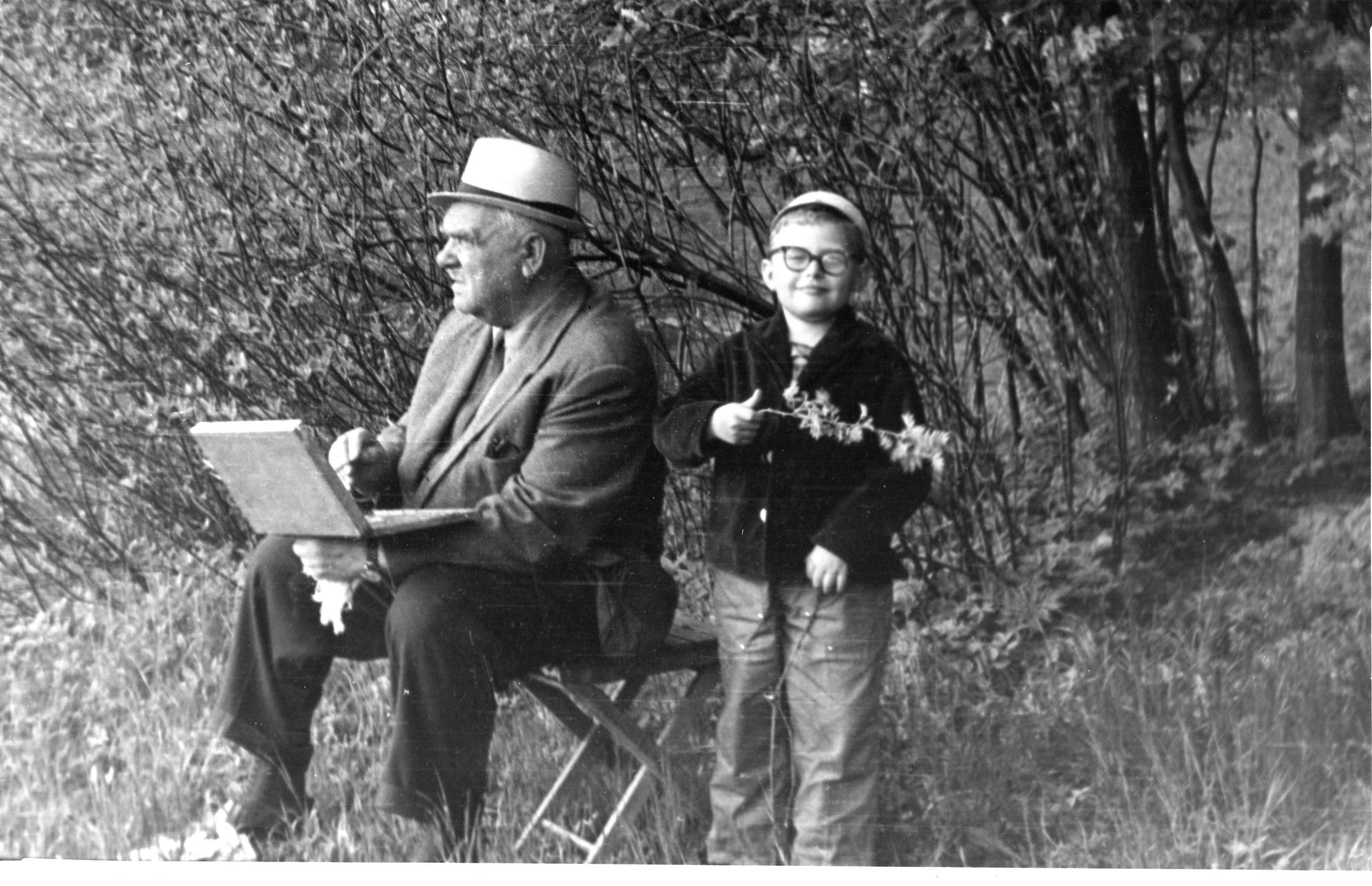
With Bulykin's grandson in Pavlovsk Park painting, June 1968

== Awards ==
- Order of Lenin № 36030
- 4 orders of the Red Banner
- Order of Bogdan Khmelnitsky 1st class № 198
- Order of Kutuzov 2nd class № 711
- Medal "For the Defence of Leningrad"
- Medal "For the Defence of the Caucasus"
- Jubilee Medal "XX Years of the Workers' and Peasants' Red Army"
- Foreign awards:
  - Commemorative Medal of the Battle of Dukla Pass (Czechoslovakia)
  - Medal of Victory and Freedom 1945 (Poland)
  - Medal for Participation In The Patriotic War 1944-1945 (Bulgary)

Awards of Robert Brichenok was sold with documents at "Baldwin's" auction for $100 000 in 2006.
