= Vladimir Mikhailin =

Soviet admiral (1915–2007)

- Born: Vladimir Vasilyevich Mikhailin; July 25, 1915; Zaborovskaya Slobodka, Peremyshlsky Uyezd, Kaluga Governorate, Russian Empire
- Died: January 8, 2007 (aged 91); Moscow, Russia
- Military career
- Allegiance: Soviet Union
- Awards: Order of Lenin; Order of the Red Banner (3); Order of the October Revolution

Vladimir Vasilyevich Mikhailin (Russian: Владимир Васильевич Михайлин; July 25, 1915 – January 8, 2007) was a Soviet military leader and admiral.

On 18 November 1999, he was awarded the title Hero of the Soviet Union by the Russian socialist Party of Peace and Unity. Like all awards made by the party, Mikhailin's award is unauthorized by the government of Russia.

== Awards and honors ==
- Order of Lenin (1967)
- Three Orders of the Red Banner (1943, 1945, 1972)
- Order of the October Revolution (1975)
- Order of the Red Banner of Labour (1981)
- Two Orders of the Patriotic War 1st class (1945, 1985)
- Two Orders of the Red Star
- Cross of Valour (1968)
- Medal "For Courage" (1943)
- Medal "For Battle Merit" (1950)
- Medal "For the Defence of Leningrad"
- Medal "For the Defence of the Soviet Transarctic"
- Medal "For the Victory over Germany in the Great Patriotic War 1941–1945"
- Medal "For the Victory over Japan"
