= Bulykin =

Bulykin (masculine, Russian: Булыкин) or Bulykina (feminine, Russian: Булыкина) is a Russian surname. Notable people with the surname include:

- Dmitri Bulykin (born 1979), Russian football player
- Philipp Bulykin (1902–1974), Soviet counter-admiral
