= Mikhail Golant =

Mikhail Borisovich Golant
- Born: 3 February 1923; Moscow, Russian SFSR, Soviet Union
- Died: 7 February 2001 (aged 78); Moscow, Russian Federation
- Education: Moscow Power Engineering Institute (1951)
- Known for: Design of backward-wave tubes (BWTs)
- Awards: Lenin Prize; USSR State Prize; State Prize of the Russian Federation (2000)
- Scientific career
- Fields: Engineering
- Workplaces: NPO Istok
- Academic advisors: Nikolay Devyatkov

Mikhail Borisovich Golant (Russian: Михаи́л Бори́сович Го́лант; 3 February 1923 – 7 February 2001) was a Soviet and Russian scientist and engineer. Best known as a leader of Soviet design of backward-wave tubes, he was awarded the Lenin Prize, the USSR State Prize, and the State Prize of the Russian Federation. He worked with Nikolay Devyatkov on the application of EHF therapy.

== Biography ==
Mikhail Golant was born to well-educated parents in Moscow on 3 February 1923. His father, Boris Golant, was a food chemist; his mother was a doctor of medicine. Each of his siblings and cousins also went on to earn advanced scientific degrees.

Mikhail Golant began to attend the Moscow Power Engineering Institute (MPEI) in 1940. His studies were interrupted by the military draft following the German invasion of the Soviet Union in 1941, when Golant was eighteen. He took part in the Red Army's campaigns against both Nazi Germany and Imperial Japan as a sapper from 1941 to 1945 and was wounded on three occasions.

Golant returned to the Moscow Power Engineering Institute following his demobilization in April 1946 and graduated with distinction in 1951.

Golant's research teams developed a novel approach to designing backward-wave tubes in the late 1950s and early 1960s. Though superseded by advances in semiconductors, Golant's designs made possible a variety of experiments and investigations using millimeter and submillimeter wave ranges.

In an obituary summarizing the highlights of Golant's career, the Nobel Prize winner Alexander Prokhorov and E. M. Dianov, Academicians of the Russian Academy of Sciences, wrote:

The contribution of Golant, an outstanding specialist and engineer, to the development of contemporary science is difficult to overestimate. Along with significant achievements in electronic science and technology, his name is associated with a new age in the physics of millimeter and submillimeter waves. . . . The development of BWTs, which still remain at the leading edge of technology by a number of their parameters, can, without exaggeration, be thought of as one of the greatest advances in world electronics. This breakthrough made it possible to perform unique microwave experiments in radio physics, biology, and medicine and also gave rise to the evolution of a new field in experimental physics – millimeter- and submillimeter-wave BWT spectroscopy.
Galant always defended his scientific ideas to the end. The peak of his activity fell at the onset of semiconductor electronics and laser physics. At that time, experimentation with low-power vacuum tubes appeared to be out of date. It was becoming clear that multiwatt-power vacuum tubes would be ousted by semiconductor devices. However, BWTs designed by Golant still remain a basic tool for physical research in the millimeter- and submillimeter-wave ranges.
The same is true for biophysical investigations into the effect of low-intensity microwaves on living organisms. He directed these investigations and took active part in them by himself. Results obtained do not fit today's ideas and concepts but will undoubtedly revolutionize our knowledge about information processing and transfer in the cells of living organisms.

He died on 7 February 2001.

== Honors and awards ==
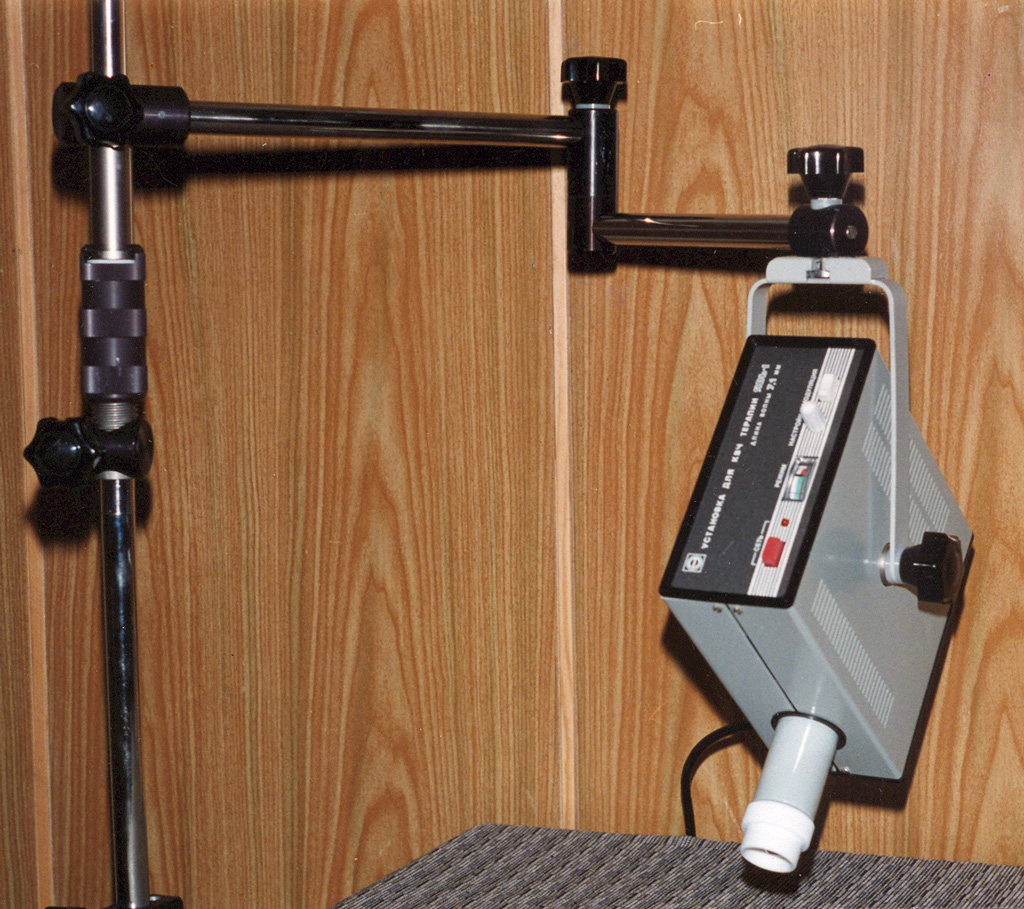
An EHF therapy device developed on the basis of research by Golant and others in the 1980s.

=== Military ===
- Order of the Red Star (twice)
- Medal "For the Defence of Leningrad"
- Medal "For the Victory over Germany in the Great Patriotic War 1941–1945"
- Medal "For the Victory over Japan"

=== Civilian ===
- Lenin Prize
- USSR State Prize
- State Prize of the Russian Federation (2000)
