= Zinoviy Kolobanov =

Soviet tank commander (1911–1994)

Zinovy Grigoryevich Kolobanov
- Зиновий Григорьевич Колобанов
- Born: 7 January 1911; Arefino village, Muromsky Uyezd, Vladimir Governorate, Russian Empire (now Vachsky District, Nizhny Novgorod Oblast, Russia)
- Died: 8 August 1994 (aged 83); Minsk, Belarus
- Military career
- Allegiance: Soviet Union
- Branch: Red Army
- Service years: 1941–1958
- Rank: Lieutenant colonel
- Units: 2nd Tank Brigade; 70th Rifle Division; 6th Separate Heavy Tank Brigade; 1st Light Tank Brigade; 97th Panzer Division; 14th Light Tank Brigade; 49th Panzer Division; 1st Panzer Division; 12th Mechanized Division; 9th Panzer Division; 7th Guards Tank Division; 12th Mechanized Division; 50th Guards Motor Rifle Division
- Conflicts: World War II; Winter War; Siege of Leningrad
- Awards: Order of the Red Banner

Zinovy Grigoryevich Kolobanov (Russian: Зино́вий Григо́рьевич Колоба́нов) (7 January 1911– 8 August 1994) was a Soviet-Russian tank commander and veteran of World War II. He commanded a KV-1 tank and is widely considered the second top scoring tanker ace of the Soviet Union.

== Early life ==
Zionviy Grigoryevich Kolobanov was born on 25 December 1910 in the village of Arefino, Vladimir Governate, Russian Empire, into a peasant family. His father died during the Russian Civil War, and Kolobanov worked from a young age before attending the Gorky Industrial Technical School. While studying there, he was conscripted into the Red Army on 16 February 1933.

Kolobanov initially served in infantry training before being transferred to the Orel Armored School Named after M.V.Frunze. He graduated with honors in 1936 and was assigned to the Leningrad Military District as a tank officer. During the Soviet-Finnish War, he served as a tank company commander and was awarded the Order of the Red Banner for his service.

== Service ==
At the Battle of Leningrad on 20 August 1941, in Krasnogvardeysk (now Gatchina), Kolobanov's unit ambushed a column of German armour. The vanguard of the German 8th, 6th and 1st Panzer Divisions was approaching Krasnogvardeysk near Leningrad (now St Petersburg), and the only Soviet force available to stop it consisted of five well-hidden KV-1 tanks, dug in within a grove at the edge of a swamp. KV-1 tank no. 864 was commanded by the leader of this small force, Lieutenant Kolobanov.

The German forces attacked Krasnogvardeysk from three directions. Near Myza Vojskovitsi, Seppelevo, Vangostarosta (now Noviy Uchkhoz), Ilkino and Pitkelevo settlements, the geography favoured the Soviet defenders as the only road in the region passed the swamp, and the defenders commanded this choke point from their hidden position. Lieutenant Kolobanov had carefully studied the situation and readied his detachment the day before. Each KV-1 tank carried twice the normal amount of ammunition, two-thirds of which were armour-piercing rounds. Kolobanov ordered his other commanders to hold their fire and await orders. He did not want to reveal the size of his force, so only one tank at a time engaged the enemy.

The 6th Panzer Division's vanguard entered directly into the well-prepared Soviet ambush. The gunner in Kolobanov's KV-1, Andrei Usov, knocked out the leading German tank with its first shot. The German column assumed that the tank had hit an anti-tank mine and, failing to realize that they were being ambushed, stopped. This gave Usov the opportunity to destroy the second tank. The Germans realized they were under attack but were unable to locate the origin of the shots. While the German tanks fired blindly, Kolobanov's tank knocked out the trailing German tank, boxing in the entire column.

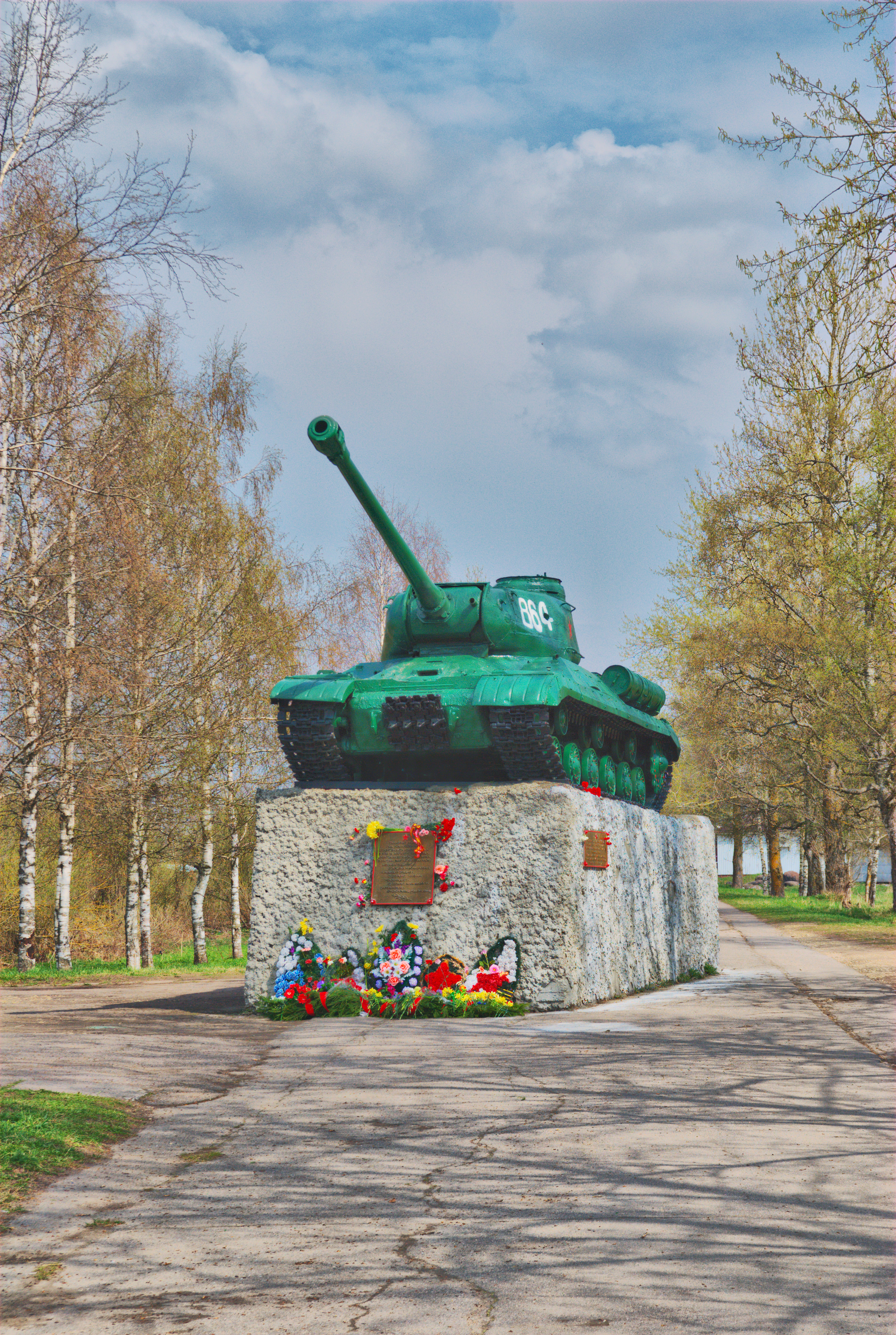
Novy Uchkhoz memorial

Although the Germans now knew where they were being attacked from, they could not spot Lieutenant Kolobanov's tank, and now attempted to engage an unseen enemy. The German tanks got bogged down when they moved off the road onto the surrounding soft ground making them easy targets. Twenty-two German tanks and two towed artillery pieces were knocked out by Kolobanov's tank before it ran out of ammunition. Kolobanov ordered in another KV-1, and 21 more German tanks were destroyed before the half-hour battle ended. A total of 43 German tanks had been destroyed by the five Soviet KV-1s (two more remained in reserve). The Soviet victory was the result of a well-planned ambush on advantageous ground and superiority of weapons. Most of the German tanks in this battle were light tanks armed with only 37 mm guns. The German tank guns had neither the range nor the power of the 76 mm main gun of a KV-1. After the battle, the crew of No. 864 counted a total of 156 hits on their tank, none of which had penetrated the armor. The narrower tracks of the German tanks caused them to become trapped in the swampy ground.

For their actions, Lieutenant Kolobanov was awarded the Order of the Red Banner and Andrei Usov was awarded the Order of Lenin. However, a nomination of Kolobanov for Hero of the Soviet Union was rejected by military superiors who initially found his after-action report to be unbelievable, thinking that he must have exaggerated the enemy forces. Though his report was soon corroborated by examination of the wreckages on the ground, the nomination was not reconsidered by Leningrad authorities who were preoccupied with the fiercest fighting during the Battle of Leningrad.

Kolobanov continued to score successes on the battlefield in the following month, destroying at least three enemy tanks and four anti-tank guns. On 15 September 1941, behind the frontlines, he was badly wounded in the head and spine near Pushkin, Saint Petersburg by an explosion of tank ammunition; he spent most of the rest of the war in hospital. In 1945 he returned to active duty, but arrived too late to participate in combat before the surrender of Germany. In 1951, Lieutenant Kolobanov served in the Soviet occupation zone in East Germany, where he was court-martialed when a subordinate escaped to the British occupation zone. After that, he was transferred to the reserves.

He remained in the army for some years, based in Belarus, and retired as a lieutenant-colonel. He then went on to work for the Minsk Auto Works.

Due to popular demand by the villagers of Noviy Uchkhoz, a battle monument was dedicated in 1980 at the place where Kolobanov's KV-1 was dug in. Unfortunately, it was impossible to find a KV-1 tank, so an IS-2 heavy tank was installed there instead. On 8 September 2006, a monument in his honour was unveiled in Minsk, the capital of Belarus. It was sponsored by the director of AGAVA, Vasiliy Monich.

== Honours and awards ==
Order of the Red Banner (3 February 1942, 30 April 1954)
Order of the Patriotic War, 1st class (1 August 1986)
Order of the Red Star (20 June 1949)
Medal "For Battle Merit" (6 May 1946)
Medal "For the Defence of Leningrad" (1942)
Medal "For the Victory over Germany in the Great Patriotic War 1941–1945" (1945)
Jubilee Medal "Twenty Years of Victory in the Great Patriotic War 1941–1945" (1965)
Jubilee Medal "Thirty Years of Victory in the Great Patriotic War 1941–1945" (1975)
Jubilee Medal "Forty Years of Victory in the Great Patriotic War 1941–1945" (1985)
Jubilee Medal "In Commemoration of the 100th Anniversary of the Birth of Vladimir Ilyich Lenin" (1969)
Jubilee Medal "30 Years of the Soviet Army and Navy" (1948)
Jubilee Medal "40 Years of the Armed Forces of the USSR" (1958)
Jubilee Medal "50 Years of the Armed Forces of the USSR" (1968)
Jubilee Medal "60 Years of the Armed Forces of the USSR" (1978)
Jubilee Medal "70 Years of the Armed Forces of the USSR" (1988)
Medal "Veteran of the Armed Forces of the USSR" (1976)
