= Yuri Yappa =

Soviet and Russian theoretical physicist

- Юрий Яппа
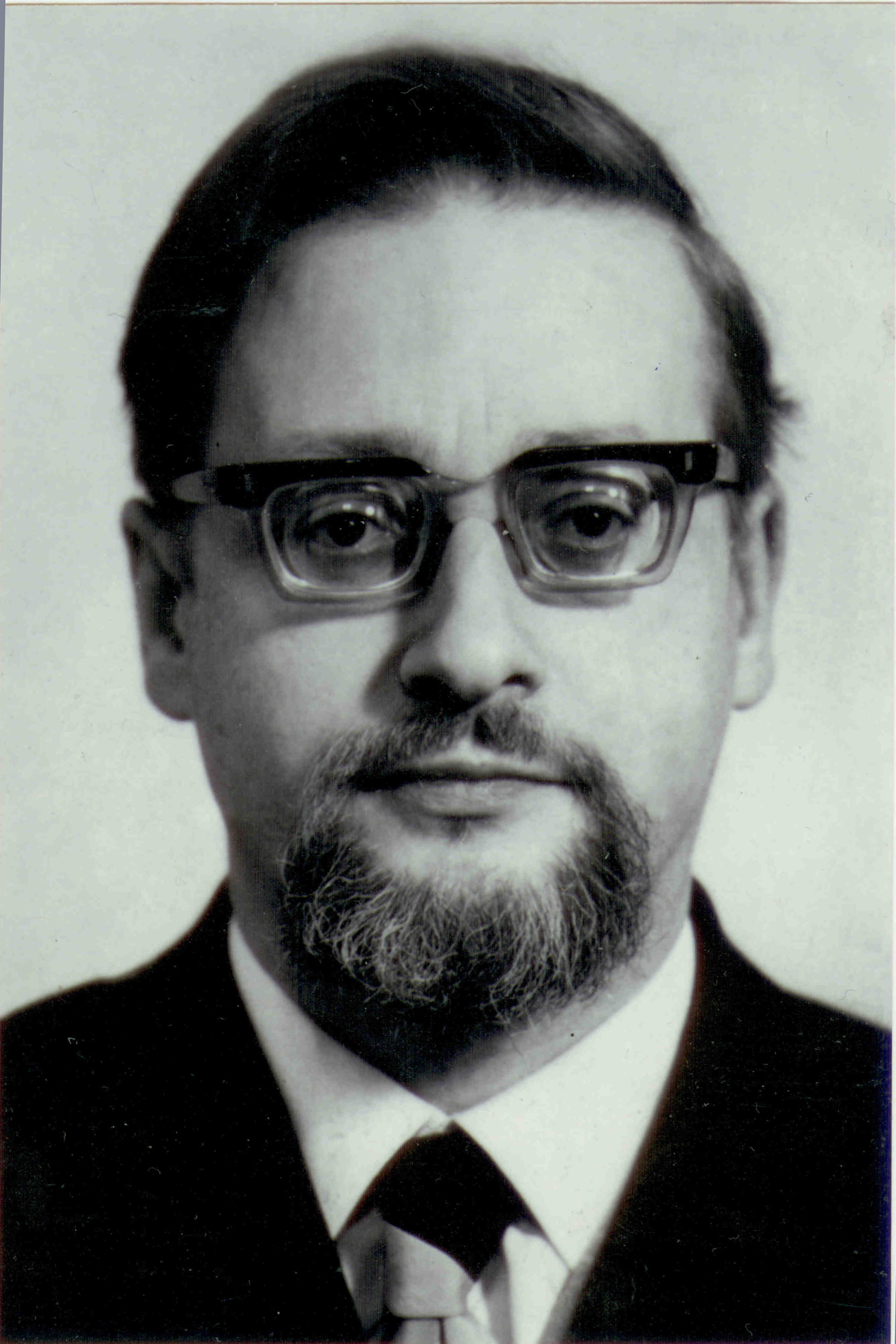
- Yuri Yappa (photo of 1978)
- Born: Russian: Юрий Андреевич Яппа; September 21, 1927; Leningrad, Russian SFSR, Soviet Union
- Died: August 19, 1998 (aged 70); Saint Petersburg, Russian Federation
- Education: Leningrad University
- Awards: Medal "For the Defence of Leningrad"
- Scientific career
- Fields: Theoretical Physics
- Workplaces: Saint Petersburg State University; JINR

Yuri Andreevich Yappa (Russian: Юрий Андреевич Яппа) (September 21, 1927 – August 19, 1998) was a Soviet and Russian theoretical physicist. He is known for publications on particle physics, quantum field theory, General Relativity, philosophy of science, and for his graduate texts on classical electrodynamics and theory of spinors.

== Biography ==
Yuri Yappa was born in Leningrad, USSR in the family of doctor Andrei Yappa (German: Andreas Jappa, Russian: Андрей Яппа).

In 1941, because of the German invasion in the Soviet Union and the Siege of Leningrad he had to interrupt his regular education and to start working. During the whole Siege of Leningrad he worked at the hospital where his father also worked. In 1944, he was awarded of medal "For the Defence of Leningrad". In parallel with the work in the hospital, he continued his self-education, so that in 1944 he passed exams for the entire course of the school and started to study at the Physical Faculty of the Leningrad University. During the winter of 1944-1945 he with a few other students alternated their studies with a work as stokers in the university's boiler-house. Yuri Yappa also started to work at the laboratory of molecular physics, but later, following an advice of its head Viktor Tsvetkov, joined a theoretical physics group.

In 1949 he graduated from the Leningrad University, then continued postgraduate studies there at the chair of theoretical physics headed by Vladimir Fock. Since then Yuri Yappa was the nearest collaborator of Vladimir Fock till the death of the latter in 1974.

== Academic career ==
In 1953 Yuri Yappa earned his PhD (Russian: кандидат наук) degree with a thesis on the relativistic theory of elementary particles.

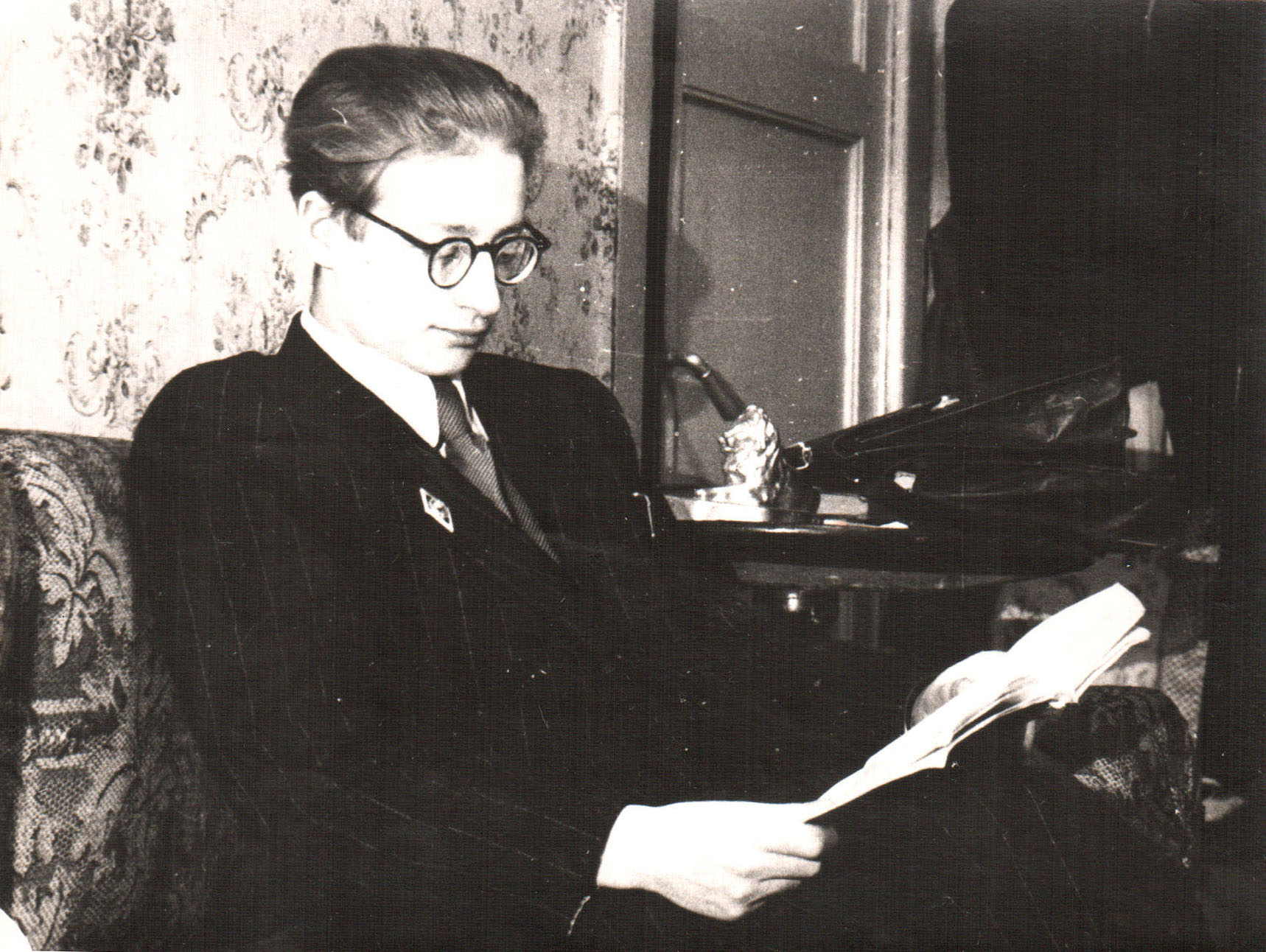
Yuri Yappa in 1957.

In 1954–1956, he led a group of theoreticians at the Institute of Nuclear Problems of the Soviet Academy of Sciences in Dubna (Moscow Region). His group worked on the theory of elementary particles and provided theoretical explanation of experimental results on proton scattering. In the same period he also edited two collective monographs in the series "Problems of Modern Physics".

In 1956 the Institute of Nuclear Problems was united with the Electrophysical Laboratory of Vladimir Veksler in Dubna to form the Joint Institute for Nuclear Research, and Yuri Yappa continued to work in this new institution. However, owing to personal circumstances, he discontinued the work in Dubna and in 1957 started to work at the chair of theoretical physics of the Physical Faculty of the Leningrad University. After the chair had split, in the 1970s–1990s he continued at the chair of the theory of nucleus and elementary particles (nowadays the chair of high-energy and elementary particle physics).

Yuri Yappa was a senior research scientist (Russian: старший научный сотрудник) since 1956 and an assistant professor (Russian: доцент) since 1968. He published over 40 papers on quantum field theory, General Relativity, mathematics, and philosophy of science.

== Scientific work and teaching ==
Yuri Yappa led a number of theoretical courses in the Leningrad/St.-Petersburg University, including his well-known courses of General Relativity, which was passed to him by Vladimir Fock in 1958, and of classical electrodynamics, which served the base of his graduate book (coauthored by Viktor Novozhilov) Electrodynamics, whose revised edition was published and republished in English. His graduate text on the theory of spinors was finished by his university colleagues and published posthumously.

== Honors and awards ==
- Medal "For the Defence of Leningrad" (1944)
- Medal "In Commemoration of the 250th Anniversary of Leningrad" (1957)
- Jubilee Medal "Forty Years of Victory in the Great Patriotic War 1941–1945" (1985)

== Works published in English ==
- Novozhilov, Yu. V.; Yappa, Yu. A. (1986) [1981]. Electrodynamics. Translated from Russian by V. I. Kisin (Revised ed.). Moscow: Mir Publishers.
- Levitskii, B. A.; Yappa, Yu. A. (1981). "Covariant generalization of Noether's theorems for fields with spin". Theoretical and Mathematical Physics. 48 (2): 715–721. Bibcode:1981TMP....48..715L. doi:10.1007/bf01019082. S2CID 120581499.
- Levitskii, B. A.; Yappa, Yu. A. (1982). "Structure of the energy-momentum tensor and the spin tensor in a covariant theory of a spinor field". Theoretical and Mathematical Physics. 53 (2): 1107–1113. Bibcode:1982TMP....53.1107L. doi:10.1007/bf01016680. S2CID 120962084.
- Yappa, Yu. A. (1987). "On the interpretation of anticommuting variables in the theory of superspace". Letters in Mathematical Physics. 14 (2): 157–159. Bibcode:1987LMaPh..14..157Y. doi:10.1007/bf00420306. S2CID 120533337.
- Yappa Yu. A. (1988) "Notes on the Dirac equation in an N-dimensional space". Preprint DIJ 211/88. Dijon: University of Burgundy.
