= Nikolay Devyatkov =

Russian scientist

- Николай Девятков
- Born: 11 April 1907; Vologda, Russian Empire
- Died: 1 February 2001 (aged 93); Moscow, Russia
- Citizenship: Soviet Union, Russia
- Education: Leningrad Politechnical Institute
- Known for: Inventor of a reflex klystron MM-wave Therapy
- Awards: Hero of Socialist Labour (1969), Stalin Prize (1949), Lenin Prize (1965), State Prize of the Russian Federation (2000)
- Scientific career
- Fields: Electronics
- Workplaces: NPC "Istok"; Institute of Radio-engineering and Electronics; Moscow Institute of Physics and Technology
- Notable students: Mikhail Golant

Nikolay Dmitrievich Devyatkov (Russian: Николай Дмитриевич Девятков; 11 April [O.S. 29 March] 1907 – 1 February 2001) was a Soviet and Russian scientist and inventor of microwave vacuum tubes and medical equipment. Full Member of the USSR/Russian Academy of Sciences (1968; Corresponding Member from 1953). Professor of the Moscow Institute of Physics and Technology.

Most of Devyatkov's scientific papers apply to microwave vacuum tubes. He was an author of more than 250 scientific works and inventions, and was the inventor of a reflex klystron (1939, with E. Daniltsev).

== Biography ==
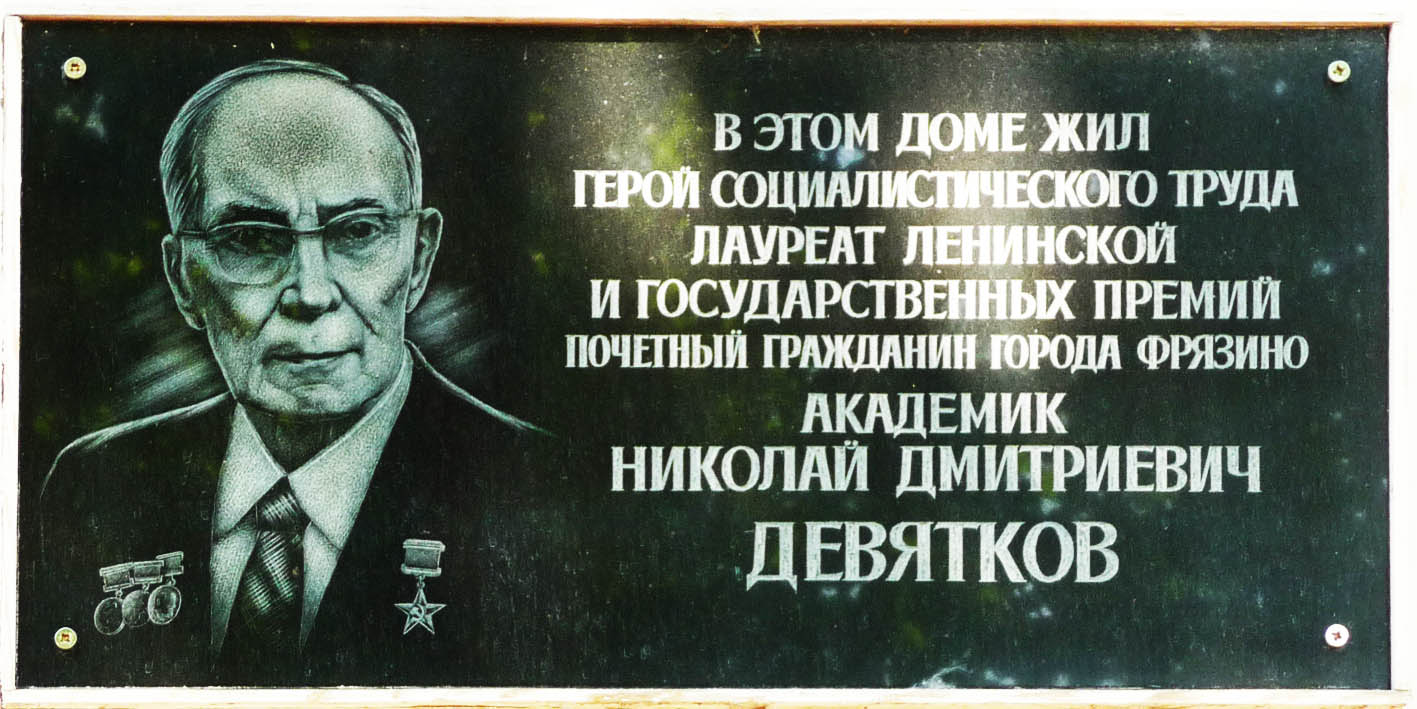
The memorial board established on the house where there lived Nikolay Devyatkov. Vokzalnaya str., 19, Fryazino, Moscow oblast

Nikolay Devyatkov worked in 54 years at the enterprise "Istok" in Fryazino, Moscow Oblast, in the head Soviet (now Russian) enterprise of microwave electronics, including 39 years as Deputy Director for Science.

Nikolay Devyatkov organized the publication of the journal "Electronic Engineering. Series 1, "Microwave Electronic", the editorial board of which he headed since its release in 1950 until his death. He was the chief editor of the journal "Radio Engineering and Electronics".

Nikolay Devyatkov was never a member of the Communist Party of the Soviet Union.

== The founder of Soviet and Russian medical electronics ==
Although the main work of Nikolay Devyatkov were aimed at improving the country's defense, he also made a significant contribution to the development of medical instrumentation.

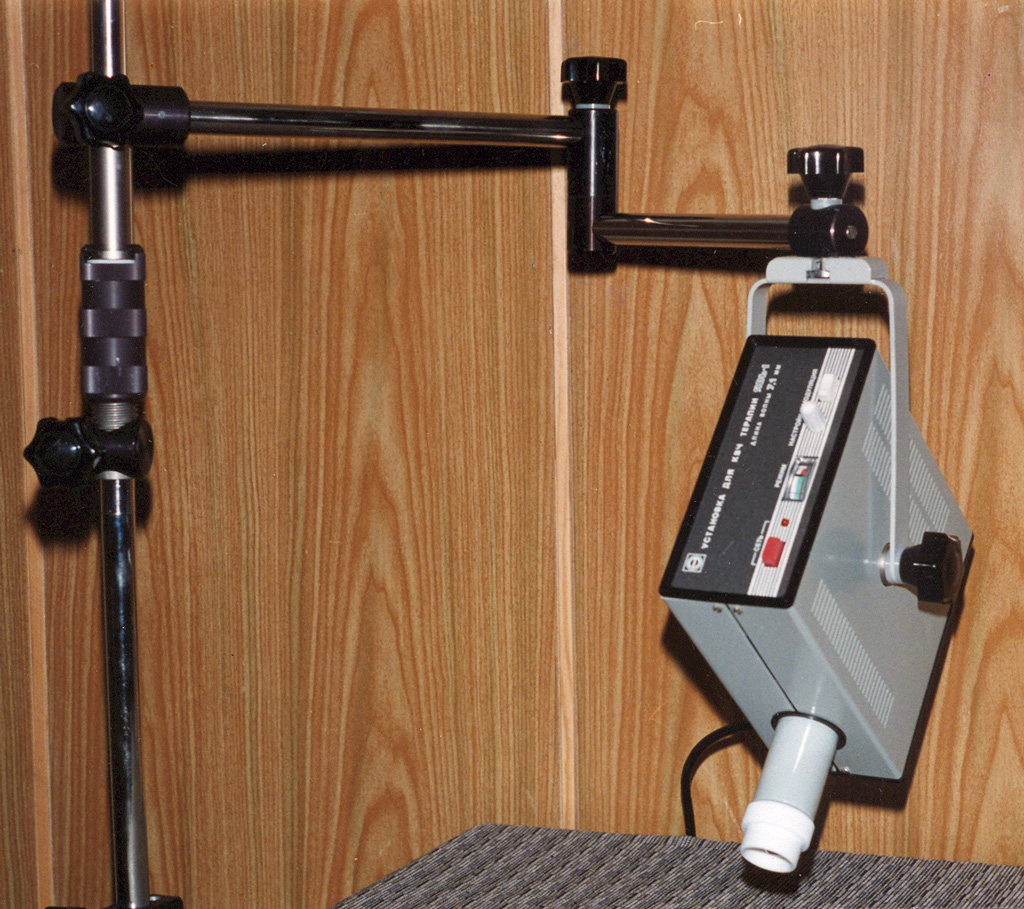
The MM-wave Therapy apparatus «Yav-1»

=== MM-wave Therapy ===
Nikolay Devyatkov with colleagues developed the theoretical foundations of low-intensity millimeter waves therapy (MM-wave Therapy) also called Extremely High Frequency (EHF) Therapy. In the mid-1980s, under the guidance of Nikolay Devyatkov the company "Istok" (Fryazino, Moscow Oblast) has developed the first device for MM-wave therapy "Jav-1". The Committee on New Medical Technology of the Ministry of Health of the USSR recommended the "Jav-1" for serial production (1987) and included one in the National Register of medical devices. In late 1980 the "Istok" has been established mass serial production the "Jav-1". "Jav-1" was also produced in the company "Start", Penza. The "Istok" and "Start" don't produce the "Jav-1" now.

=== Microwave thermotherapy ===
Nikolay Devyatkov, together with Eduard Gelvic, Vladimir Mazohin and others developed the theoretical framework and create an apparatus of the microwave thermotherapy (hyperthermia) operating local electromagnetic hyperthermia of malignant neoplasms. At present, this direction is actively developed and theoretical developments Devyatkov and his colleagues are embodied in manufactured today in the company "Istok" installation:

- "Yachta-4M" for the local microwave thermotherapy of malignant neoplasms and diseases of the prostate
- "Yachta-5" for the general and local microwave thermotherapy of malignant neoplasms.

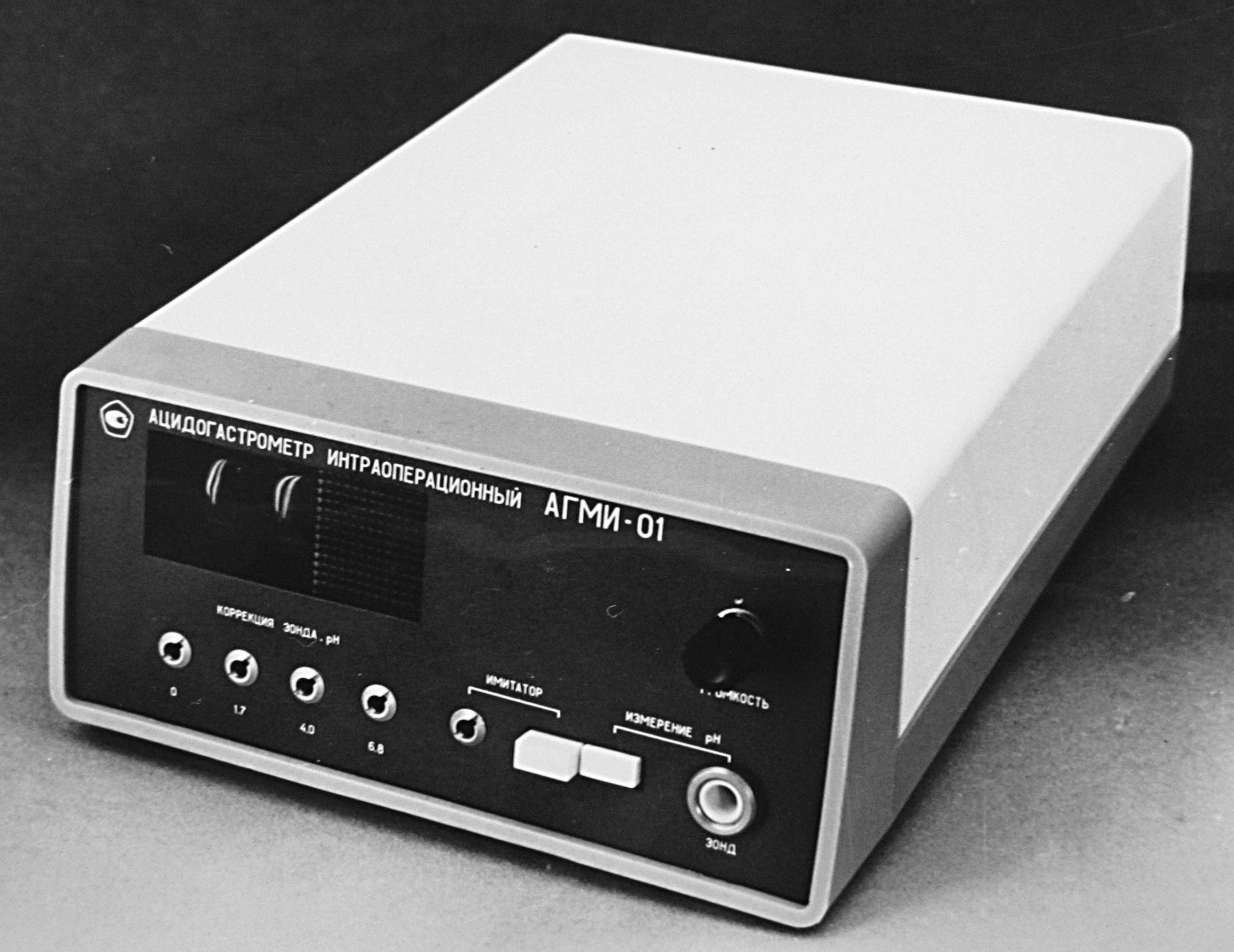
The acidogastrometr «AGMI-01» for intragastric and intraoperation pH-metry

=== Gastrointestinal and intraluminal pH-metry and manometry ===
In 1969-1970, Devyatkov with his colleagues designed the world's first industrial model of pH probe, which measured the acidity of the two points of the gastrointestinal tract and apparatus for recording the pH. Also he created the original versions of pH-probes with 3, 4 and 5 sensors, intraoperation, endoscopic, children's pH-probes for different age groups, dentistry and gynecology pH-probes, as well as equipment, recording pH with multisensor pH-probes. With the direct participation Devyatkov the NPC "Istok" were organized serial production of the first in the USSR pH-probes for gastrointestinal pH-metry. Method of complex study of the functional state of the stomach and duodenum, providing simultaneous measurement of pressure and acidity in different parts of the gastrointestinal tract and is called at that time "ionomanometry" has been applied in medical practice since 1974. Under the guidance of Devyatkov was made probe with 4 pH sensors, and 4 plastic manometric catheters.

This area of his research has its modern development in the devices for diagnostic gastroenterology: esophageal pH monitoring, esophageal motility study, electrogastroenterography and other, that has brandname "Gastroscan" in Russia and are the main products of Fryazino company ZAO NPP «Istok-Sistema».

=== Other areas ===
Devyatkov and his colleagues performed a series of pioneering work in the field of medical thermography, were developed the therapy and surgical lasers, electrodes for coagulation endovascular veins, xenon feeds "Yakhont" for the treatment of otolaryngology, dental and gynecological diseases, and others.

== Awards ==
Devyatkov received the Stalin Prize (1949), the Lenin Prize (1965), the State Prize of the Russian Federation (2000) and the Hero of Socialist Labour (1969). He was also awarded two Orders of Lenin, the Order of the October Revolution, two Orders of the Red Banner of Labour and an Order of the Red Star.
