= Philipp Bulykin =

Soviet counter-admiral and author

Philipp Fyodorovich Bulykin
- Филипп Фёдорович Булыкин
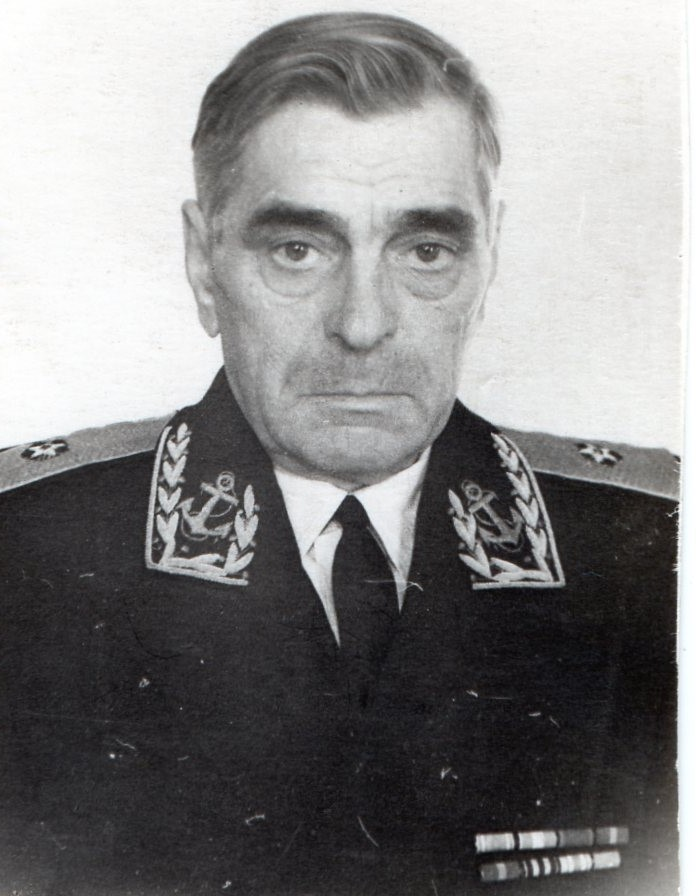
- Born: November 27, 1902; Debri village, Tambov Governorate, Russian Empire
- Died: April 17, 1974 (aged 71); Leningrad, RSFSR, USSR
- Burial place: Pavlovsk
- Military career
- Allegiance: Soviet Union
- Branch: Navy
- Service years: 1924 – 1954
- Rank: Counter-admiral
- Commands: Soviet destroyer Nezamozhnik; Department of navigation in Soviet Navy headquarters
- Conflicts: World War II; Eastern Front; Soviet–Japanese War

Philipp Fyodorovich Bulykin (Russian: Филипп Фёдорович Булыкин; 27 November 1902 – 17 April 1974) was a Soviet counter-admiral (1946) and a navigator of the Soviet Navy (1943 – 1947). He was the author of navigation books.

== Gallery ==
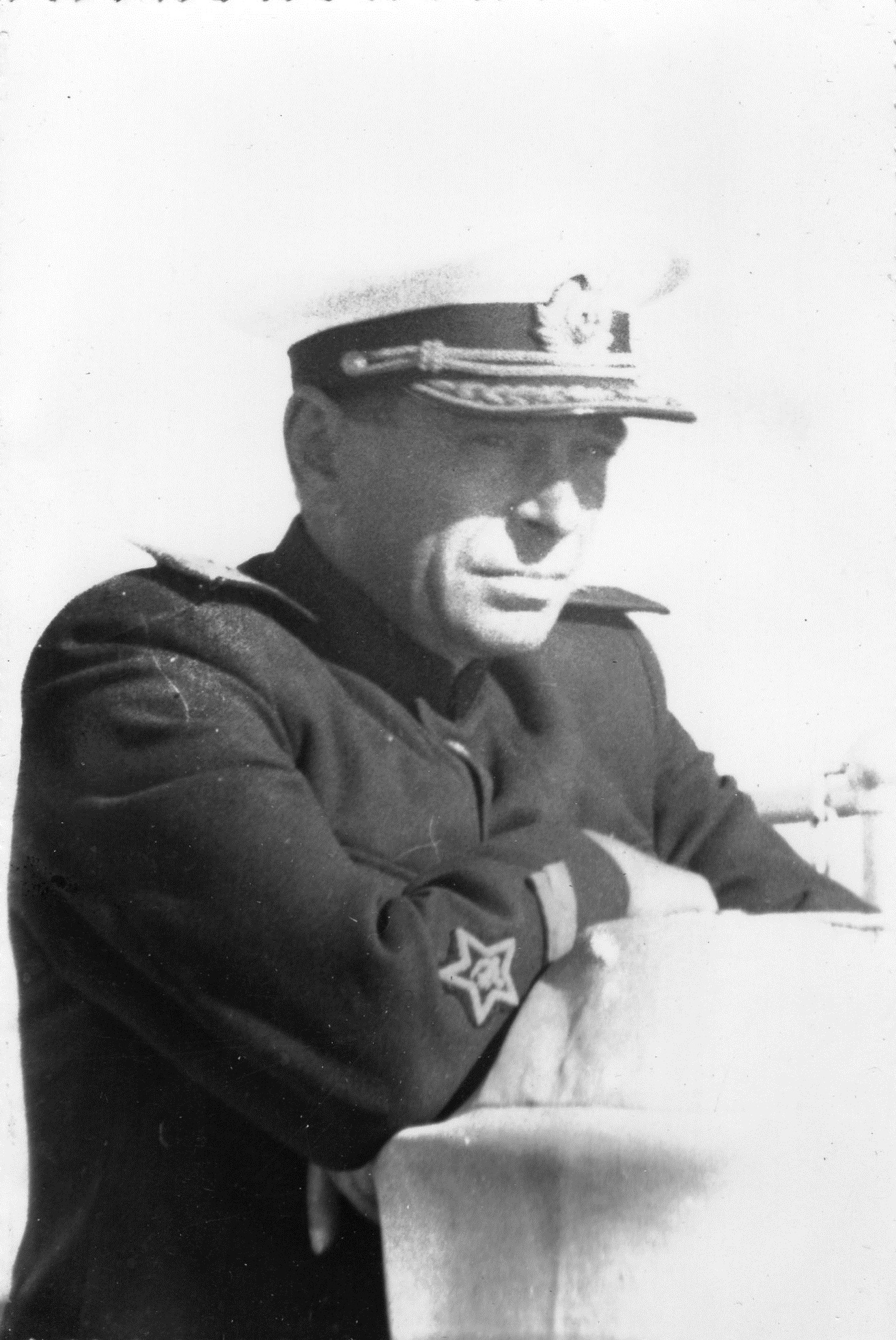
Bulykin on "Ekvator" ship, 1949.

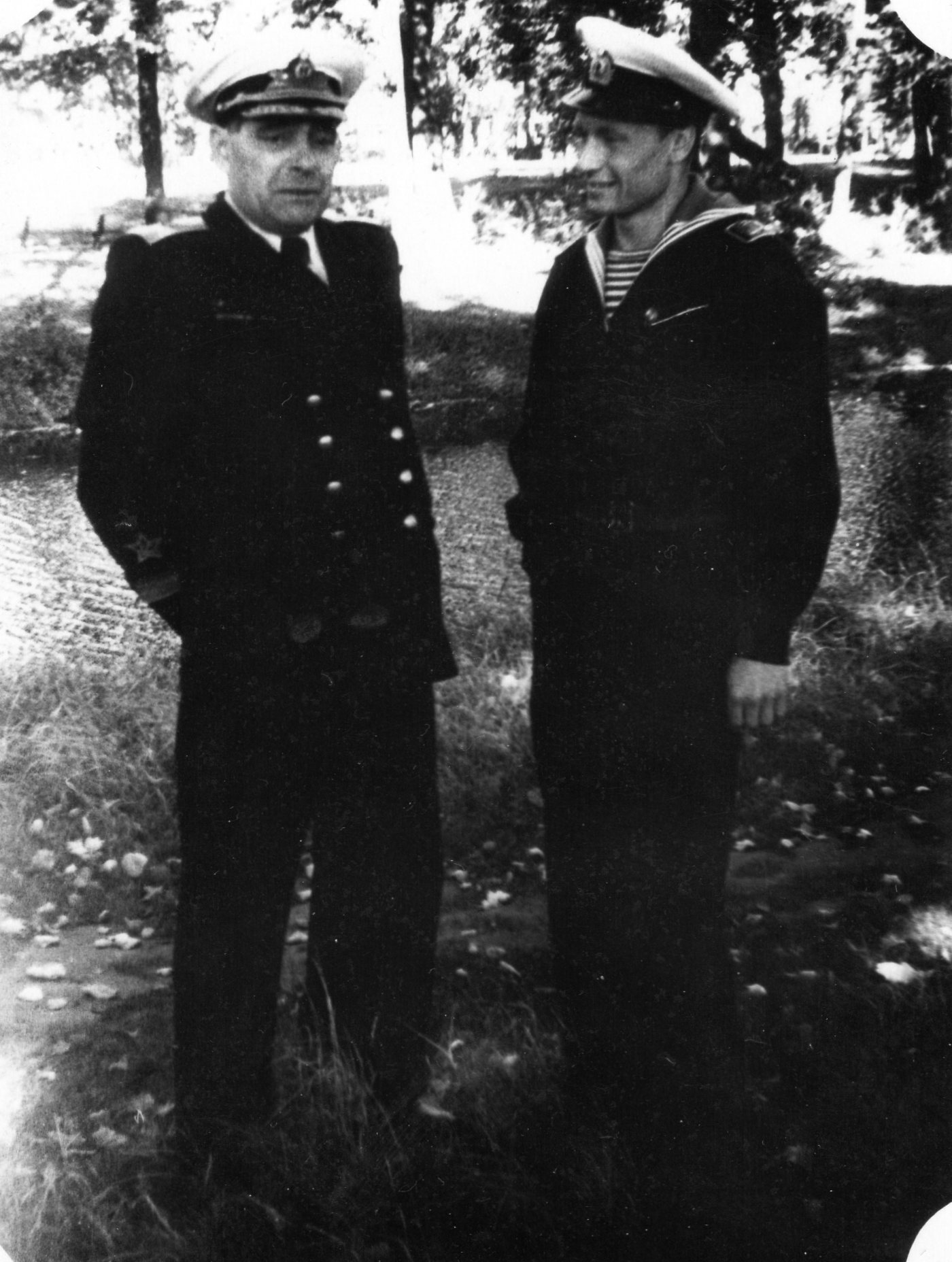
Bulykin with son in Sevastopol.

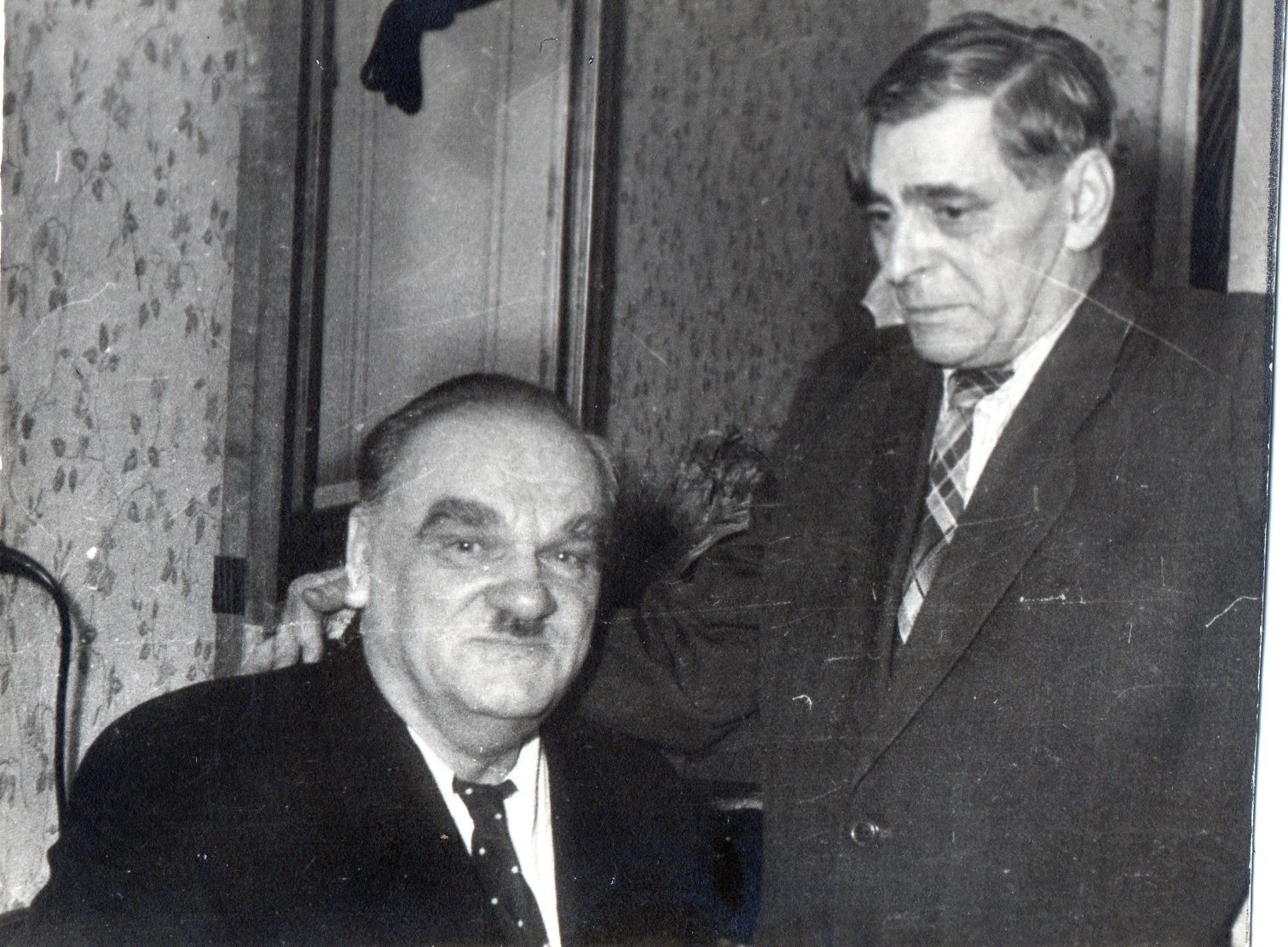
Bulykin with Robert Brichenok.

== Books by Bulykin ==
- Ф. Ф. Булыкин (1943). Памятка капитана каботажного флота (in Russian) (3000 экз ed.). Moscow: Морской транспорт. p. 28.
- Булыкин Ф. Ф. (1944). Ещё сильнее бить врага на Балтике! (in Russian) (22) (Блокнот агитатора Военно-Морского флота СССР ed.): 1–10.
- Правила для предупреждения столкновений судов в море (in Russian). Л.: Северо-западное картографическое издательство. 1945.
- Ф. Ф. Булыкин (1952). Курс навигации и лоции (in Russian). Vol. 2 «Лоция». Moscow: Воениздат. p. 123.
- Зиновьев К. Ф. (1952). "Ч. 2". Сборник задач по мореходной астрономии (in Russian). Leningrad.
- Ф. Ф. Булыкин (1958). Лоция (PDF) (in Russian). Moscow: Воениздат. p. 154.

== Awards ==
- Order of Lenin (1950)
- Order of the Red Banner (1945)
- Order of the Patriotic War (second class) (1945)
- 2 Orders of the Red Star (both 1944)
- Medals (For the Victory over Germany For the Victory over Japan, jubilee medals)
- Named weapon (Naval dirk and pistol) (1952)

== Literature ==
- Летопись журнальных статей (in Russian) (вып. 34 ed.). Kraus Reprint. 1944.
