= Medal "For the Defence of Leningrad" =

Military decoration of the Soviet Union

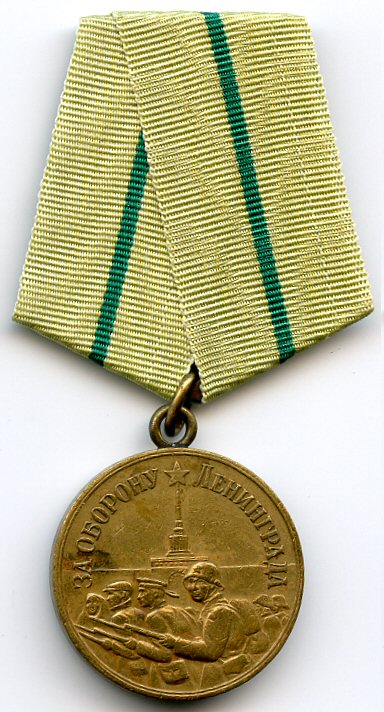
- Medal "For the Defence of Leningrad" (obverse)
- Type: Campaign medal
- Awarded for: Participation in the defence of Leningrad
- Presented by: USSR
- Eligibility: Citizens of the Soviet Union
- Status: No longer awarded
- Established: December 22, 1942

Highlights
- Total: 1,470,000
- Ribbon of the Medal "For the Defence of Leningrad"

Precedence
- Next (higher): Medal "For the Salvation of the Drowning"
- Next (lower): Medal "For the Defence of Moscow"

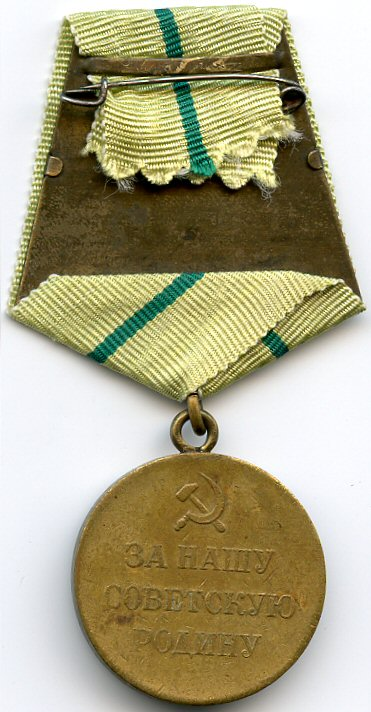
Reverse of the Medal "For the Defence of Leningrad"

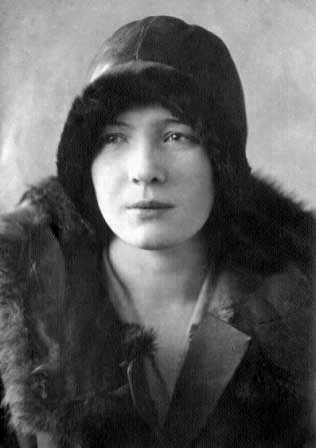
Wartime Leningrad radio broadcaster Olga Bergholz, a recipient of the Medal "For the Defence of Leningrad"

The Medal "For the Defence of Leningrad" (Russian: Медаль «За оборону Ленинграда») was a World War II campaign medal of the Soviet Union established on December 22, 1942 by decree of the Presidium of the Supreme Soviet of the USSR to recognise the valour and hard work of the Soviet civilian and military defenders of Leningrad during the 872-day siege of the city by the German armed forces between September 8, 1941 and January 27, 1944. The medal's statute was later amended by Resolution of the Presidium of the Supreme Soviet on March 8, 1945. and again one last time on July 18, 1980 by decree of the Presidium of the Supreme Soviet of the USSR № 2523-X.

== Medal statute ==
The Medal "For the Defence of Leningrad" was awarded to all participants in the defence of Leningrad - soldiers of the Red Army, Navy and troops of the NKVD, and also to the persons from the civilian population who took part in the defence of Leningrad during its siege by German forces.

The Resolution of the Presidium of the Supreme Soviet of March 8, 1945 granted the petition of Yaroslavl regional organizations to award the medal "For the Defence of Leningrad" to the most distinguished participants in the construction of defensive structures in the Leningrad area by the civilian population of the Yaroslavl region.

Award of the medal was made on behalf of the Presidium of the Supreme Soviet of the USSR on the basis of documents attesting to actual participation in the defence of Leningrad issued by the unit commander, the chief of the military medical establishment or by a relevant provincial or municipal authority. Serving military personnel received the medal from their unit commander, retirees from military service received the medal from a regional, municipal or district military commissioner in the recipient's community, members of the civilian population, participants in the defence of Leningrad received their medal from regional or city Councils of People's Deputies. The medal came with by an award certificate.

The Medal "For the Defence of Leningrad" was worn on the left side of the chest and in the presence of other awards of the USSR, was located immediately after the Medal "For Distinction in Guarding the State Border of the USSR". If worn in the presence or Orders or medals of the Russian Federation, the latter have precedence.

== Medal description ==
The Medal "For the Defence of Leningrad" was a 32mm in diameter circular brass medal with a raised rim. At the forefront in the lower half of the obverse, the relief images of a helmeted Red Army soldier (nearest), a sailor (middle) and a worker (farthest), all three with rifles at the ready. In the background of the entire obverse, the relief outline of the Leningrad Admiralty building. Along the upper circumference of the medal, the relief inscription in prominent letters "FOR DEFENCE OF LENINGRAD" (Russian: «ЗА ОБОРОНУ ЛЕНИНГРАДА»). On the reverse near the top, the relief image of the hammer and sickle, below the image, the relief inscription in three rows "FOR OUR SOVIET MOTHERLAND" (Russian: «ЗА НАШУ СОВЕТСКУЮ РОДИНУ»).

The Medal "For the Defence of Leningrad" was secured by a ring through the medal suspension loop to a standard Soviet pentagonal mount covered by a 24mm wide olive green silk moiré ribbon with a 2mm central green stripe.

== Recipients (partial list) ==
The individuals below were recipients of the Medal "For the Defence of Leningrad".

- Politician in charge of the defence of Leningrad Andrei Alexandrovich Zhdanov
- Poet and wartime Leningrad radio broadcaster Olga Fyodorovna Bergholz
- Seriously wounded at Leningrad painter Sergei Ivanovich Osipov
- Marshal of the Soviet Union Kliment Yefremovich Voroshilov
- Marshal of the Soviet Union Georgy Konstantinovich Zhukov
- People's Artist of the USSR Galina Pavlovna Vishnevskaya
- Marshal of the Soviet Union Leonid Aleksandrovich Govorov
- Marshal of the Soviet Union Kirill Afanasievich Meretskov
- Marshal of the Soviet Union Sergey Fyodorovich Akhromeyev
- Rear Admiral Vladimir Konstantinovich Konovalov
- People's Artist of the USSR Yuri Vladimirovich Nikulin
- Stage actor and director Yuri Petrovich Lyubimov
- Admiral Vladimir Filippovich Tributs
- Admiral Gordey Ivanovich Levchenko
- Lieutenant General Alexey Alexandrovich Kuznetsov
- Army General Ivan Ivanovich Fedyuninsky
- Admiral of the Fleet Hovhannes Stepani Isakov
- Admiral Vladimir Vasilyevich Mikhailin
- Ace tanker Lieutenant Colonel Zinoviy G. Kolobanov
- Captain 1st grade Ivan Vasilyevich Travkin
- Honoured Artist of Russian Federation Nikolai Efimovich Timkov
- Leningrad native and veteran Piotr Konstantinovich Vasiliev
- Veteran artilleryman Rostislav Ivanovich Vovkushevsky
- Veteran artilleryman People's Artist of the Russian Federation Ivan Mikhailovich Varichev
- Champion figure skater Maya Petrovna Belenkaya
- Marshal of the Soviet Union Petr Kirillovich Koshevoi
- Lieutenant General Nikolai Pavlovich Simoniak
- Scientist and engineer Mikhail Borisovich Golant
- Painter Nikolai Nikolaevich Brandt
- Physicist Yuri Andreevich Yappa

== See also ==
- Awards and decorations of the Soviet Union
- Saint Petersburg
- Hero City
- Siege of Leningrad
