= Medal "For the Victory over Japan" =

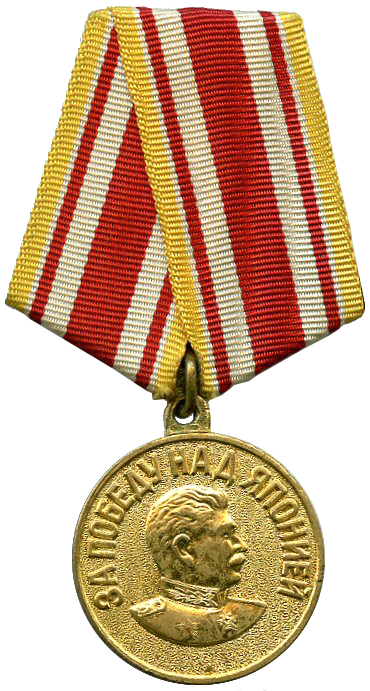
- Medal "For the Victory over Japan" (obverse)
- Type: Campaign medal
- Awarded for: Combat action in the battles in the east and in the Pacific
- Presented by: USSR
- Eligibility: Citizens of the Soviet Union
- Status: No longer awarded
- Established: September 30, 1945

Highlights
- Total: 1,831,000
- Ribbon of the Medal "For the Victory over Japan"

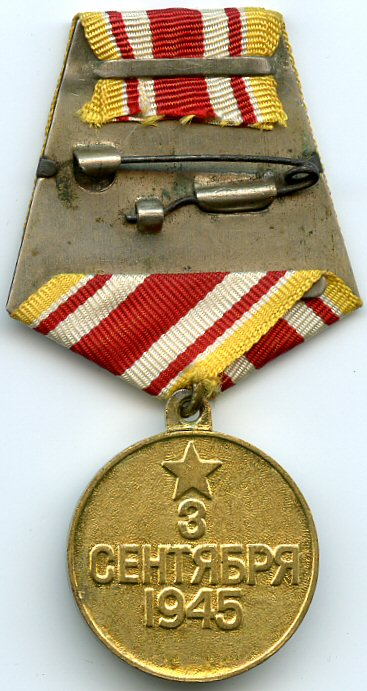
Reverse of the Medal "For the Victory over Japan"

The Medal "For the Victory over Japan" (Russian: Медаль «За победу над Японией») was a campaign medal of the Soviet Union established on September 30, 1945 by decree of the Presidium of the Supreme Soviet of the Soviet Union to commemorate the Soviet victory over the Empire of Japan in the Soviet–Japanese War at the end of World War II. The medal's statute was later amended on July 18, 1980 by decree of the Presidium of the Supreme Soviet of the USSR № 2523-X.

== Medal statute ==
The Medal "For the Victory over Japan" was awarded to all military personnel and members of the civilian staff of the units and formations of the Red Army, Navy and troops of the NKVD, who took a direct part in hostilities against the Japanese imperialists in the Far East as part of the 1st or 2nd Far Eastern or Transbaikal Fronts, the Pacific Fleet or Amur River Flotilla; to military personnel of the central offices of the People's Commissariat for Defense, the People's Commissariat of the Navy of the USSR and the NKVD, who took part in planning the operations of Soviet troops in the Far East.

Award of the medal was made on behalf of the Presidium of the Supreme Soviet of the USSR on the basis of documents attesting to actual participation in combat operations against Japan issued by unit commanders or the chief of a military medical establishment. Recipients serving in the armed forces of the Red Army, Navy and troops of the NKVD received the medal from their unit commander, retirees from military service received the medal from a regional, municipal or district military commissioner in the recipient's community.

The Medal "For the Victory over Japan" was worn on the left side of the chest and in the presence of other awards of the USSR, was located immediately after the Jubilee Medal "Thirty Years of Victory in the Great Patriotic War 1941–1945". If worn in the presence of orders or medals of the Russian Federation, the latter have precedence.

== Medal description ==
The Medal "For the Victory over Japan" was a 32mm in diameter circular brass medal with a raised rim on both sides. On its pebbled obverse, the left facing bust of Joseph Stalin surrounded on the sides and top by the relief inscription along the medal's circumference "FOR THE VICTORY OVER JAPAN" (Russian: «ЗА ПОБЕДУ НАД ЯПОНИЕЙ»). On the reverse, at the top, a plain five-pointed star, under the star, the inscription on three rows "3 SEPTEMBER 1945" (Russian: «3 СЕНТЯБРЯ 1945»).

The Medal "For the Victory over Japan" was secured by a ring through the medal suspension loop to a standard Soviet pentagonal mount covered by a 24mm wide silk moiré ribbon composed of a central 6mm red stripe bordered by 3.5mm white stripes, 2mm red stripes, 1mm white stripe, then 2.5mm yellow edge stripes.

== Recipients (partial list) ==
The individuals below were all recipients of the Medal "For the Victory over Japan".

- Marshal of the Soviet Union Georgy Konstantinovich Zhukov
- Major Pavel Ivanovich Belyayev
- Marshal of the Soviet Union Dmitriy Feodorovich Ustinov
- Marshal of the Soviet Union Aleksandr Mikhaylovich Vasilevsky
- Marshal of the Soviet Union Rodion Yakovlevich Malinovsky
- Marshal of the Soviet Union Kirill Afanasievich Meretskov
- Colonel General Nikolay Nilovich Burdenko
- Admiral of the Fleet Ivan Stepanovich Isakov
- Marshal of Aviation Sergei Alexandrovich Khudyakov
- Lieutenant colonel Philipp Mishelevich Tseitlyn
- Lieutenant German Alexeevich Tatarinov
- Army General Sergei Matveevich Shtemenko
- Army General Semion Pavlovich Ivanov
- Scientist and engineer Mikhail Borisovich Golant
- Honored Artist of the RSFSR Boris Sergeevich Ugarov
- Kim Il-Sung
- Zhou Baozhong
- Chŏng Sangjin
- Yakov Novichenko

== See also ==
- Pacific War
- Soviet–Japanese War
- Japanese Instrument of Surrender
- Awards and decorations of the Soviet Union
