= Philip Tseitlin =

Philipp Mishelevich Tseitlyn
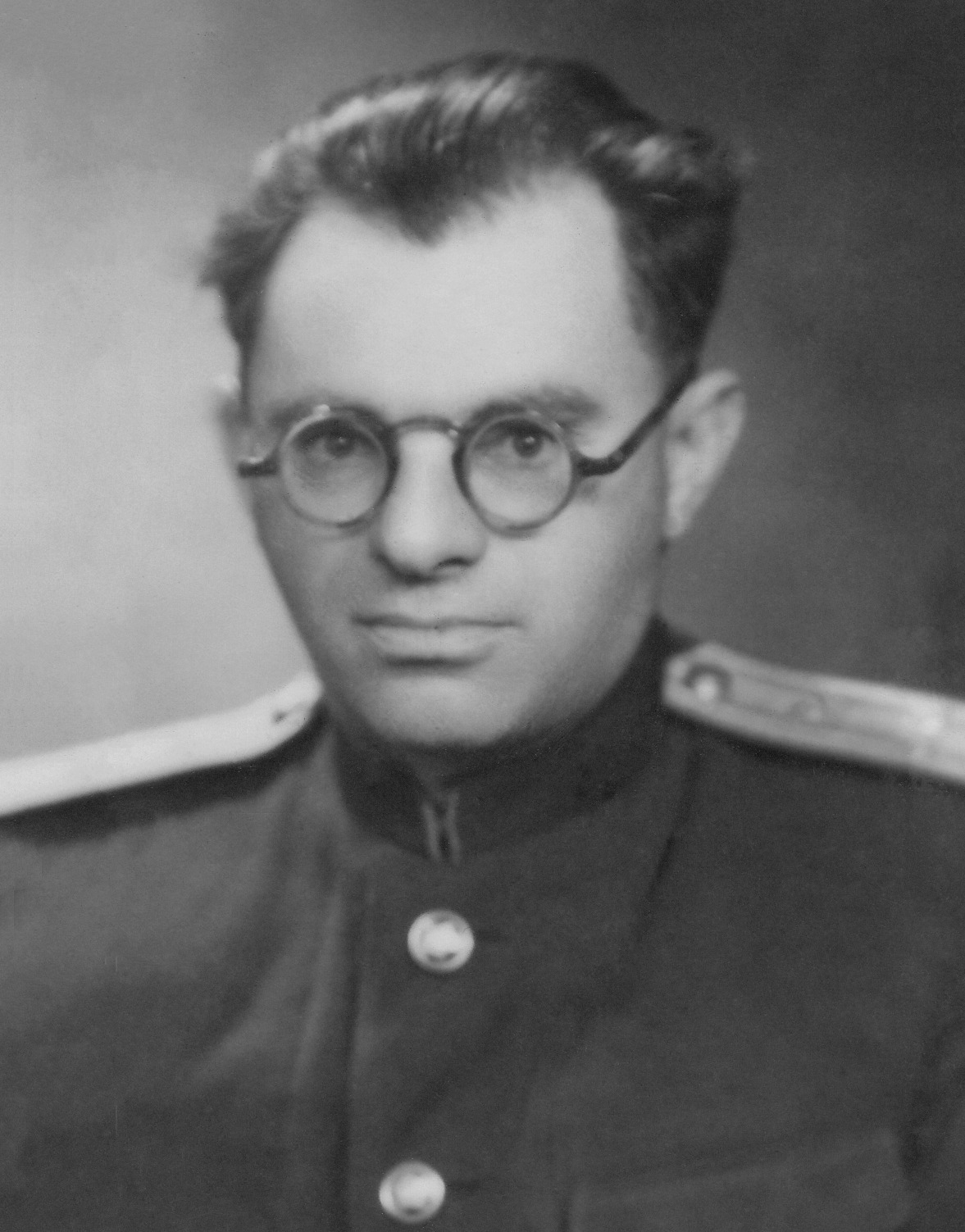
- Philipp Tseitlyn in 1953
- Native name: Филипп Мишелевич Цейтлин
- Born: 1905; Feodosia, Russian Empire
- Died: 1968 (aged 62–63) Stavropol, Russian SFSR
- Allegiance: Soviet Union
- Branch: Red Army
- Service years: 1935–1960
- Rank: Lieutenant colonel
- Awards: Order of the Red Banner

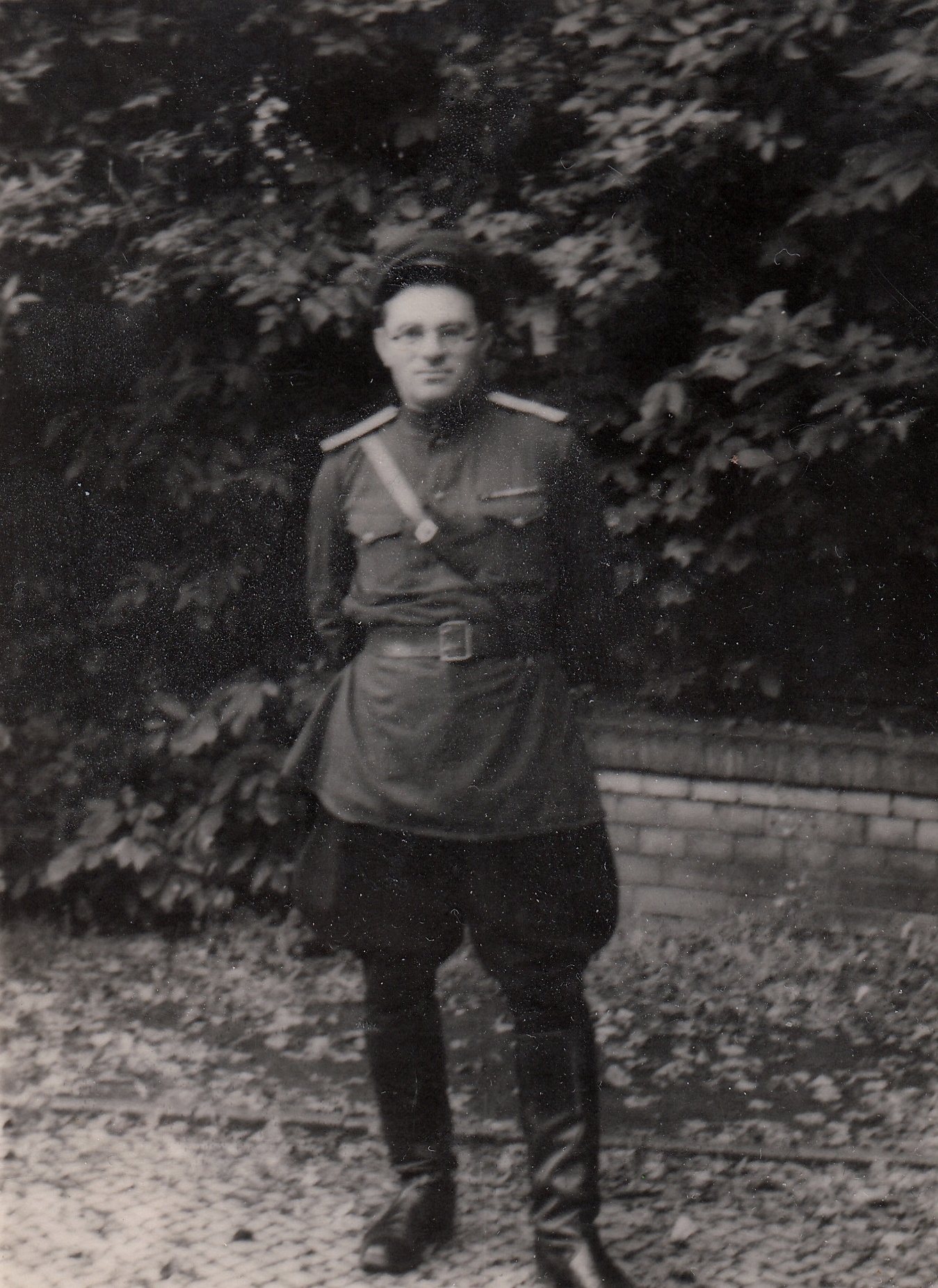
Philipp Tseitlyn in 1950

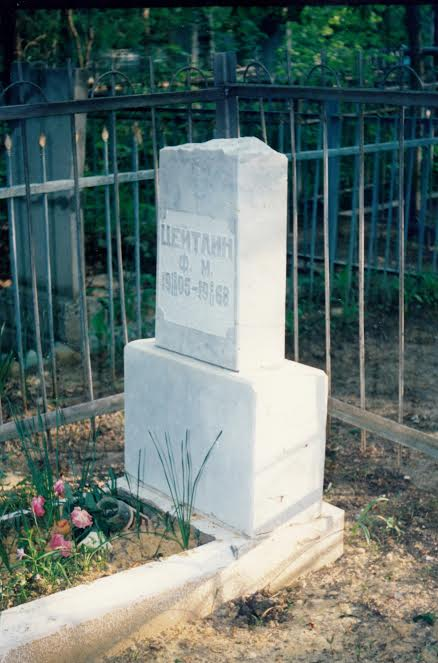
Philipp Tseitlyn Gravestone

Philipp Mishelevich Tseitlyn (Филипп Мишелевич Цейтлин) (1905–1968) was а lieutenant colonel and medical doctor in the Soviet Army.

== Early life ==
Philipp was born in Feodosia, Crimea. He was the second child of five – he had three brothers and a sister. Their mother died in 1918 at the age of 38 and their father remarried. The stepmother was not too kind to Philipp and his siblings; she showed preference to her own son. She however, forced all of the kids to read – she would lock them in the closet and since there was nothing else to do, the kids read. Later in life, they appreciated this harsh treatment as it made them extremely literate. Philipp left home early to work at a tobacco factory. Ever since, he was adept at tightening all kinds of knots.

== Education ==
At the age of 17, Philipp entered the Crimean University and followed this education by completing medical school at the Kuban State Medical School in 1929. After graduation, he was sent to help eradicate the cholera epidemic in the Caspian steppes.

== Army service ==
Philipp enlisted in the Army in 1935 as a commissioned officer.

== World War II service ==
During the war, Philipp was stationed in the Far East. He participated in combat there, and was awarded high combat honors for his service: The Order of the Red Banner and two Orders of the Red Star.

His commissions during the war were as follows:

- Appointed senior doctor, 6th battalion 12th Rifle Division, April 7, 1941;
- Appointed commander of Army Lazaret #41, November 26, 1941;
- Appointed commander of internal medicine Army Hospital #305, December 11, 1941;
- Appointed chief physician of the 35th Army Far Eastern Front, March 25, 1942;
- Appointed chief physician of the Primorsky Army PVO Far Eastern Front, April 14, 1945.

His Order of the Red Banner award stated: "During combat operations P. Tseitlyn quickly, properly, and with complete competence organized medical help to the wounded and sick in the Red Army's hospitals. Moreover, P. Tseitlyn directed the work of one of the most overloaded hospitals, where the number of wounded exceeded five times capacity, and despite that, insured timely, qualified medical help to all arrived wounded. While directing evacuation of wounded from combat zone to rears, P. Tseitlyn, without regard to his workload, personally prepared each wounded, showing proper care and gave these tasks all of his skills and time..."

== Later life ==
After the Far East, he was sent to post-war Germany, where he served until 1948. At that time, the campaign against cosmopolitanism was in full swing. Anti-cosmopolitanism targeted Jews and as a result, many Jewish officers were sent back to the USSR – they were not trusted to project Soviet power abroad. Next, Philipp was sent to serve in Riga, Latvia and following that, he served in a military hospital in Stavropol, Russia. One time, he was walking across the territory of the hospital and noticed a soldier who was pretending to be iller than he truly was in order to avoid serving. In a rage, the soldier hit Philipp on the head with a stick. Philipp, however, refused to press charges. After an honorable discharge in 1960, he initially worked in a clinic, but could not bear it; he was used to treating patients from start to finish and expected that his medical recommendations would be followed. In the clinic, however, it often happened that he would see the patient only once- somebody from a remote village perhaps - without much chance to control the treatment, and it was too much for his doctor's conscience. In the last couple years of his life, he consulted in the "for-a-fee” clinic. Health care was generally free in the USSR, but after the war there were small doctors' offices where a patient could, for a nominal fee, get a consultation from a specialist. These clinics were considered premium services at the time.

At his last address, Sovetskaya 1 in Stavropol, he treated and consulted everybody who asked for his help, and never took any money. Once, his daughter, Elena, had to chase down a patient to return a crystal vase he'd left at the door (a luxury item in the country at that time). He was known for refusing payments and bribes.

== Death ==
Philipp Tseitlyn died from a heart attack in 1968. He was buried in the Danilovskoe cemetery in Stavropol, Russia.
