= List of Heroes of the Soviet Union (B) =

The Hero of the Soviet Union was the highest distinction of the Soviet Union. It was awarded 12,775 times. Due to the large size of the list, it has been broken up into multiple pages.

This color, along with the † (dagger), indicates that the title was awarded posthumously.

== Military personnel ==
Name	Unit	Rank	Date of award	Notes
Fedir Babachenko; Ukrainian: Федір Захарович Бабаченко	323rd Artillery Regiment	Junior Lieutenant	11 April 1940	—
Hamazasp Babadzhanian Armenian: Համազասպ Բաբաջանյան	3rd Mechanized Brigade	Chief marshal of the armored troops	26 April 1944	—
Aleksandr Ivanovich Babaev; Russian: Александр Иванович Бабаев	410th Artillery Regiment	Major	31 May 1945	—
Aleksandr Ivanovich Babaev; Russian: Александр Иванович Бабаев	16th Air Army	Colonel-General of Aviation	21 February 1978	—
Nikolai Babaev; Russian: Николай Архипович Бабаев	53rd Guards Tank Brigade	Guards Senior Sergeant	27 June 1945	—
Pavel Babailov; Russian: Павел Константинович Бабайлов	163rd Guards Fighter Aviation Regiment	Guards Captain	23 February 1945 †	Killed in action on 14 October 1944
Demid Babak; Ukrainian: Демид Іванович Бабак	924th Rifle Regiment	Senior Lieutenant	17 May 1944 †	Killed in action on 1 November 1943
Ivan Babak; Ukrainian: Іван Ілліч Бабак	100th Guards Fighter Aviation Regiment	Guards Junior Lieutenant	1 November 1943	—
Oleg Babak; Ukrainian: Олег Якович Бабак	Political division of the 21st Special Forces Brigade (Ministry of Internal Affairs)	Senior Lieutenant	23 September 1991 †	Killed in the First Nagorno-Karabakh War
Pyotr Babak; Ukrainian: Петро Корнійович Бабак	479th Rifle Regiment	Lieutenant Colonel	23 September 1944	—
Kalistrat Babakhin; Russian: Калистрат Иванович Бабахин	30th Guards Separate Battalion	Guards Senior Sergeant	24 March 1945	—
Nikolai Babanakov; Russian: Николай Петрович Бабанаков	87th Separate Motorized Battalion	Sergeant	29 June 1945	—
Ivan Babanin; Russian: Иван Акимович Бабанин	305th Guards Rifle Regiment	Guards Junior Lieutenant	24 March 1945	—
Nikolai Babanin; Russian: Николай Андреевич Бабанин	5th Guards Mechanized Brigade	Guards Captain	3 June 1944	—
Dmitry Babanov; Russian: Дмитрий Васильевич Бабанов	868th Rifle Regiment	Major	10 April 1945	—
Ivan Babanov; Russian: Иван Дмитриевич Бабанов	1st Guards aviation regiment	Guards Senior Lieutenant	5 November 1944	—
Yuri Babansky; Russian: Юрий Васильевич Бабанский	57th Frontier Detachment	Lance Sergeant	21 March 1969	—
Aghvan Babayan; Armenian: Աղվան Բաբայան	647th Rifle Regiment	Junior Lieutenant	24 March 1945	—
Grant Babayan; Armenian: Գրանտ Բաբայան	400th Rifle Regiment	Major	15 May 1946	—
Hmayak Babayan; Armenian: Հմայակ Բաբայան	35th Mechanized Brigade	Major-General	31 May 1945 †	Killed in the Battle of Berlin on 21 April 1945
Yakiv Babenko; Ukrainian: Яків Олексійович Бабенко	333rd Guards Rifle Regiment	Guards Lieutenant Colonel	10 April 1945	—
Vladimir Babi; Russian: Владимир Зиновьевич Баби	117th Tank Brigade	Major	24 March 1945 †	Killed in action on 6 October 1944
Pyotr Babichev; Russian: Пётр Алексеевич Бабичев	116th Guards Rifle Regiment	Guards Lieutenant	24 March 1945	—
Victor Babichev; Russian: Виктор Алексеевич Бабичев	125th Separate Anti-tank Fighter Battalion	Sergant-Major	24 March 1945	—
Vladimir Babichev; Russian: Владимир Данилович Бабичев	109th Separate Engineer Battalion	Staff Sergant	20 December 1943	—
Vasyl Babij; Ukrainian: Василь Васильович Бабій	663rd artillery regiment	Senior Lieutenant	3 June 1944	—
Makar Babikov; Russian: Макар Андреевич Бабиков	140th Separate Reconnaissance Detachment	Chief Sergeant	14 September 1945	—
Ivan Babin; Russian: Иван Васильевич Бабин	5th Guards Cavalry Regiment	Guards Junior Sergeant	10 April 1945 †	Killed in action on 13 September 1944
Ivan Babkin; Russian: Иван Васильевич Бабкин	328th Guards Fighter and Anti-Tank Artillery Regiment	Guards Senior Sergeant	9 February 1944	—
Mikhail Babkin; Russian: Михаил Николаевич Бабкин	198th Aviation Assault Regiment	Senior Lieutenant	18 August 1945	—
Vasyl Babkov; Ukrainian: Василь Петрович Бабков	434th Fighter Aviation Regiment	Captain	23 November 1942	—
Victor Baboshin; Russian: Виктор Николаевич Бабошин	218th Guards Rifle Regiment	Red Army Guard	15 January 1944	—
Aleksandr Babushkin; Russian: Александр Васильевич Бабушкин	10th Separate Reconnaissance Aviation Regiment	Captain	19 April 1945	—
Leonid Babushkin; Russian: Леонид Георгиевич Бабушкин	609th Rifle Regiment	Lance Sergeant	24 March 1945	—
Roman Babushkin; Russian: Роман Романович Бабушкин	550th Rifle Regiment	Guards Senior Lieutenant	19 April 1945	—
Vasily Badanin; Russian: Василий Иванович Баданин	78th Guards Rifle Regiment	Red Army Guard	19 March 1944	—
Fyodor Badin; Russian: Фёдор Степанович Бадин	8th Separate Flamethrower Battalion	Red Army Man	15 May 1946	—
Vladimir Badin; Russian: Владимир Иванович Бадьин	671st Artillery Regiment	Senior Sergeant	26 October 1943	—
Erentsen Badmaev; Russian: Эренцен Лиджиевич Бадмаев	785th Rifle Regiment	Senior Lieutenant	5 May 1990	—
Minulla Badrutdinov; Tatar: Миңнулла Бәдретдинов	78th Guards Regiment	Guards Sergeant	19 March 1944 †	Killed in Action on 29 September 1943
Mikhail Badyuk; Russian: Михаил Михайлович Бадюк	9th Guards Mine Torpedo Aviation Regiment	Guards Sergeant-Major	22 February 1944	—
Georgy Baevsky; Russian: Георгий Артурович Баевский	5th Guards Fighter Aviation Regiment	Guards Senior Lieutenant	4 February 1944	—
Gilmi Bagautdinov; Tatar: Гыйльми Баһаветдинов	1259th Rifle Regiment	Senior Sergeant	24 March 1945	—
Semyon Bagdasaryan; Armenian: Սեմյոն Բաղդասարյանը	400th Rifle Regiment	Lieutenant	24 March 1945	—
Museyib Baghirov; Azerbaijani: Müseyib Bağırov	206th Guards Rifle Regiment	Guards Lieutenant	22 February 1944	—
Ruben Bagirov; Armenian: Ռուբեն Բագիրովը	1176th Rifle Regiment	Lieutenant	23 September 1944	—
Ivan Bagramyan; Armenian: Հովհաննես Բաղրամյան	1st Baltic Front; Ministry of Defense of the USSR	Marshal of the Soviet Union	29 July 1944; 1 December 1977	Twice Hero of the Soviet Union
Grigory Bagyan; Armenian: Գրիգոր Բաղյան	71st Rifle Regiment	Lieutenant Colonel	29 June 1945	—
Grigory Baibarenko; Ukrainian: Григорій Миколайович Байбаренко	268th Separate Engineering Battalion	Staff Sergant	29 October 1943	—
Georgiy Baikov; Russian: Георгий Иванович Байков	9th Guards Fighter Aviation Regiment	Guards Senior Lieutenant	29 June 1945	—
Semyon Baikov; Russian: Семён Григорьевич Байков	50th Separate Motorized Engineering Battalion	Junior Lieutenant	16 March 1942 †	Killed in action on 8 July 1941
Matai Baisov; Kazakh: Матай Бәйісов	342nd Rifle Regiment	Red Army man	10 January 1944	—
Alim Baisultanov; Russian: Алим Юсуфович Байсултанов	4th Guards Fighter Aviation Regiment	Guards Captain	23 October 1942	—
Mikhail Bakalov; Russian: Михаил Ильич Бакалов	309th Guards Rifle Regiment	Guards Sergeant	19 March 1944	—
Dmitry Bakanov; Russian: Дмитрий Евстигнеевич Баканов	74th Guards Rifle Division	Guards Major-General	29 May 1945	—
Sergei Bakanov; Russian: Сергей Семёнович Баканов	696th Rifle Regiment	Lieutenant	24 March 1945	—
Mikhail Bakirov; Russian: Михаил Максимович Бакиров	9th Guards Rifle Regiment	Guards Captain	16 May 1944 †	Killed in action on 8 April 1944
Vasily Baklakov; Russian: Василий Ильич Баклаков	218th Rifle Division	Guards Colonel	23 September 1944	—
Andrey Baklan; Ukrainian: Андрій Якович Баклан	434th Fighter Regiment	Senior Lieutenant	23 November 1942	—
Gleb Baklanov; Russian: Глеб Владимирович Бакланов	34th Guards Rifle Corps	Guards Major-General	29 May 1945	—
Leonid Baklanov; Russian: Леонид Владимирович Бакланов	2nd separate regiment	Red Army man	23 September 1944	—
Aleksei Baksov; Russian: Алексей Иванович Баксов	67th Guards Rifle Division	Guards Major-General	22 July 1944	—
Mikhail Bakulin; Russian: Михаил Фёдорович Бакулин	1129th Rifle Regiment	Major	24 March 1945 †	Killed in action on 5 October 1944
Dmitry Bakurov; Russian: Дмитрий Алексеевич Бакуров	229th Rifle Regiment	Captain	16 October 1943	—
Oleksandr Balabaev; Ukrainian: Олександр Васильович Балабаєв	105th Guards Rifle Regiment	Red Army Guard	13 September 1944 †	Died of wounds sustained in battle and buried in Odessa
Anatoli Balabanov; Russian: Анатолий Иванович Балабанов	135th Guards Bomber Aviation Regiment	Guards Major	29 June 1945	—
Yuri Balabin; Russian: Юрий Михайлович Балабин	144th Guards Ground Attack Air Regiment	Guards Captain	27 June 1945	—
Juzek Balabukh; Ukrainian: Юзеф Іванович Балабух	399th Rifle Regiment	Sergeant	27 June 1945	—
Dmitry Balakhanov; Russian: Дмитрий Александрович Балаханов	609th Rifle Regiment	Commissar	26 January 1940 †	Killed in action on 12 December 1939 during the Winter War
Nikolai Balakin; Russian: Николай Пименович Балакин	120th Guards Rifle Regiment	Guards Senior Lieutenant	24 March 1945	—
Vasily Balakin; Russian: Василий Никитич Балакин	67th Guards Separate Battalion	Guards Lieutenant	24 March 1945	—
Nikolai Balakirev; Russian: Николай Михайлович Балакирев	218th Assault Aviation Regiment	Senior Lieutenant	1 July 1944	—
Aleksei Balaluev; Russian: Алексей Андреевич Балалуев	Fighter pilot instructor	Major	18 August 1945	—
Grigory Balamutkin; Russian: Григорий Васильевич Баламуткин	431st Assault Aviation Regiment	Senior Lieutenant	26 October 1944	—
Mikhail Balandin; Russian: Михаил Фокич Баландин	1065th Rifle Regiment	Junior Lieutenant	21 July 1944	—
Vasily Balandin; Russian: Василий Максимович Баландин	30th Guards Artillery Regiment	Guards Senior Lieutenant	24 March 1945	—
Vladimir Balandin; Russian: Владимир Александрович Баландин	18th Guards Fighter Aviation Regiment	Guards Senior Lieutenant	19 April 1945 †	Killed in action on 30 December 1944
Nikifor Balanov; Russian: Никифор Федотович Баланов	Spanish Civil War	Captain	27 June 1937	—
Aleksandr Balashov; Russian: Александр Иванович Балашов	22nd Fighter Aviation Regiment	Captain	29 August 1939 †	Died of wounds in Choibalsan during the Battles of Khalkhin Gol on 13 July 1939
Anatoli Balashov; Russian: Анатолий Николаевич Балашов	34th Separate Tank Regiment	Senior Lieutenant	22 February 1944	—
Evgeniy Balashov; Russian: Евгений Иванович Балашов	95th Guards Ground Attack Aviation Regiment	Guards Senior Lieutenant	27 June 1945	—
Georgiy Balashov; Russian: Георгий Сергеевич Балашов	402nd Fighter Aviation Regiment	Captain	1 July 1944	—
Ivan Balashov; Russian: Иван Филиппович Балашов	6th Long-Range Bomber Aviation Regiment	Major	7 April 1940	—
Mikhail Balashov; Russian: Михаил Ефимович Балашов	28th Guards Separate Battalion	Red Army Guard	19 March 1944 †	Killed in action on 26 September 1943
Vasily Balashov; Russian: Василий Дмитриевич Балашов	8th Separate Reconnaissance Aviation Regiment	Captain	24 August 1943	—
Vyacheslav Balashov; Russian: Вячеслав Павлович Балашов	24th Mine-Torpedo Aviation Regiment	Captain	24 July 1943	—
Garegin Balayan; Armenian: Գարեգին Բալայան	1st Motorized Rifle Battalion	Captain	23 October 1943 †	Killed in action on 25 September 1943
Anatoli Baldin; Russian: Анатолий Михайлович Балдин	92nd Guards Ground Attack Aviation Regiment	Guard Lieutenant	13 April 1944	—
Ilya Baldynov; Buryat: Илья Балдынов	109th Guards Rifle Division	Guards Colonel	8 September 1945	—
Vasily Balebin; Russian: Василий Алексеевич Балебин	1st Guards Mine-Torpedo Aviation Regiment	Guards Captain	22 February 1943	—
Irbayhan Baybulatov; Chechen: Ирбайхан Адылханович Байбулатов	690th Rifle Regiment	Senior Lieutenant	1 November 1943	—
Mariya Bayda; Russian: Мария Карповна Байда	514th Rifle Regiment	Senior Sergeant	20 June 1942	—
Sultan Baimagambetov; Kazakh: Сұлтан Біржанұлы Баймағамбетов	147th Rifle Regiment	Senior Sergant	21 February 1944 †	Killed in action on 25 July 1943
Gayaz Baymurzin; Bashkir: Баймырҙин Ғаяз Исламетдин улы	13th Guards Aviation Regiment	Guards Major	5 November 1944	—
Ismayil Bayramov; Azerbaijani: İsmayıl Bayramov	243rd Rifle Regiment	Sergeant-Major	10 April 1945 †	Killed in action on 10 February 1945
Musa Baymuhanov; Kazakh: Мұса Баймұханұлы Баймұханов	538th Rifle Regiment	Junior Lieutenant	10 April 1945	—
Tagan Bayramdurdyyev; Turkmen: Tagan Baýramdurdyýew	54th Guards Cavalry Regiment	Red Army Guard	27 February 1945	—
Mulki Bayramov; Turkmen: Mülki Baýramow	60th Guards Cavalry Regiment	Guards Senior Lieutenant	15 January 1944	—
Nikolai Bazakin; Russian: Николай Николаевич Базакин	346th Rifle Regiment	Junior Lieutenant	24 March 1945	—
Ivan Bazanrov; Russian: Иван Фёдорович Базаров	247th Fighter Regiment	Captain	2 September 1943	—
Pyotr Bazanov; Russian: Пётр Васильевич Базанов	3rd Guards Fighter Aviation Regiment	Guards Captain	26 October 1944	—
Grigory Bazdyrev; Russian: Григорий Афанасьевич Баздырёв	7th Guards Mechanized Brigade	Guards Senior Sergeant	3 June 1944	—
Nikolai Bazdyrev; Russian: Николай Дмитриевич Баздырев	1054th Rifle Regiment	Senior Sergeant	27 February 1945	—
Aleksandr Bazhanov; Russian: Александр Васильевич Бажанов	68th Rifle Regiment	Senior Sergeant	22 August 1944 †	Killed in action on 29 June 1944
Anatoli Bazhanov; Russian: Анатолий Васильевич Баженов	270th Guards Rifle Regiment	Guards Sergeant	20 December 1943	—
Gleb Bazhanov; Russian: Глеб Фёдорович Баженов	19th Guards Aviation Regiment	Guards Captain	19 August 1944	—
Grigory Bazhanov; Russian: Григорий Сергеевич Бажанов	1st Guards Mine-torpedo Aviation Regiment	Guards Captain	22 June 1944	—
Pyotr Bazhin; Russian: Пётр Яковлевич Бажин	136th Guards Rifle Regiment	Guards Captain	29 October 1943	Mistakenly believed to be posthumous
Fyodor Bazhora; Russian: Фёдор Максимович Бажора	376th Rifle Regiment	Junior Lieutenant	24 March 1945	—
Ivan Bazylev; Russian: Иван Кириллович Базылев	10th Separate Guards Battalion	Red Army Guard	4 June 1944 †	Killed in action on 12 May 1943
Dadash Bobojonov; Uzbek: Dadash Bobojonov	1369th Rifle Regiment	Red Army man	24 March 1945	—
Botir Boboyev; Uzbek: Botir Davronovich Boboyev	118th Guards Artillery Regiment	Guards Senior Lieutenant	31 May 1945	—
Tadzhali Boboyev; Uzbek: Tojiali Boboyev	1006th Rifle Regiment	Lance Sergeant	31 May 1945	—
Oleksandr Balenko; Ukrainian: Олександр Олексійович Баленко	22nd Guards Bomber Aviation Regiment	Guards Lieutenant Colonel	5 November 1944	—
Nikolai Balenko; Ukrainian: Микола Пилипович Баленко	6th Independent Guards Ground Attack Aviation Regiment	Guards Senior Lieutenant	18 August 1945	—
Leonid Balitsyki; Ukrainian: Леонід Маркович Балицький	424th Tank Battalion	Guard Senior Sergeant	10 January 1944	—
Maqash Balmagambetov; Kazakh: Мақаш Балмағамбетов	73rd Guards Rifle Division	Guards Sergeant	22 February 1944	—
Vasily Balmat; Russian: Василий Семёнович Балмат	60th Mixed Aviation Division	Lieutenant	26 June 1991 †	Killed in action on 2 December 1941
Imangali Baltabanov; Kazakh: Иманғали Тәукешұлы Балтабанов	289th Rifle Regiment	Sergeant	10 April 1945	—
Eduard Balin; Russian: Эдуард Дмитриевич Балтин	41st Division of Northern Submarine Fleet	Captain	9 October 1981	—
Nikolai Balukov; Russian: Николай Михайлович Балуков	529th Rifle Regiment	Senior Lieutenant	29 October 1943	—
Ivan Balychev; Russian: Иван Моисеевич Балычев	957th Rifle Regiment	Red Army man	23 October 1943	—
Mykola Bal; Ukrainian: Микола Васильович Баль	315th Tank Battalion	Senior Lieutenant	10 January 1944	—
Ivan Baliuk; Ukrainian: Іван Федорович Балюк	54th Guards Fighter Aviation Regiment	Guards Captain	24 August 1943	—
Asyim Balyaev; Tatar: Асыйм Баляев	78th Guards Rifle Regiment	Red Army Guard	19 March 1944	—
Yakov Balyaev; Russian: Яков Илларионович Баляев	355th Separate Marine Corps Battalion	Red Navy man	14 September 1945 †	Killed in action on 14 August 1945
Leonid Balyakin; Russian: Леонид Николаевич Балякин	Vladivostok 1st Battalion Division	Lieutenant Captain	14 August 1945	—
Aleksandr Balyasnikov; Russian: Александр Михайлович Балясников	4th Tank Company	Guards Senior Sergeant	18 December 1956	—
Aleksei Balyasnikov; Russian: Алексей Иванович Балясников	181st Guards Fighter Aviation Regiment	Guards Captain	23 February 1945	—
Sergei Bamburov; Russian: Сергей Никонорович Бамбуров	65th Rifle Regiment	Junior political instructor	25 October 1938	—
Ivan Banifatov; Russian: Иван Сергеевич Банифатов	35th Aviation Assault Regiment	Senior Lieutenant	6 March 1945	—
Anatoli Bankuzau; Belarusian: Анатоль Іванавіч Банкузаў	17th Guards Rifle Regiment	Guards Lieutenant Colonel	5 May 1945	—
Boris Bannikov; Russian: Борис Фёдорович Банников	42nd Rifle Regiment	Red Army man	30 October 1945 †	Killed in action on 15 October 1943
Pavel Bannov; Russian: Павел Илларионович Баннов	79th Tank Brigade	Sergeant	27 August 1943	—
Vasily Bantsekin; Russian: Василий Николаевич Банцекин	109th Guards Rifle Regiment	Red Army Guard	15 January 1944 †	Went missing in action in November 1943 and presumed dead.
Aleksandr Barabanov; Russian: Александр Кузьмич Барабанов	5th Guards Artillery Regiment	Guards Corporal	20 December 1943	—
Pyotr Vasilyevich Barabanov; Russian: Пётр Васильевич Барабанов	616th Rifle Regiment	Corporal	24 March 1945	—
Pyotr Ivanovich Barabanov; Russian: Пётр Иванович Барабанов	28th Tank Regiment	Guards Lieutenant	24 May 1944	—
Opanas Barabash; Ukrainian: Опанас Семенович Барабаш	22nd Guards Independent	Guards Lieutenant Colonel	16 May 1944	—
Dmitro Barabolkin; Ukrainian: Дмитро Федорович Бараболкин	291st Guards Rifle Regiment	Guards Senior Lieutenant	19 April 1945	—
Mykhailo Barabolyko; Ukrainian: Михайло Петрович Бараболько	355th Separate Marine Corps Battalion	Major	14 September 1945	—
Tatyana Baramzina; Russian: Татьяна Николаевна Барамзина	252nd Rifle Regiment	Corporal	24 March 1945 †	Captured, tortured, and executed on 5 July 1944
Vladimir Baranenko; Russian: Владимир Яковлевич Бараненко	947th Aviation Assault Regiment	Senior Lieutenant	15 May 1946	—
Vasily Barannikov; Russian: Василий Фёдорович Баранников	299th Guards Artillery Regiment	Guard Senior Sergeant	24 March 1943	—
Ardalyon Baranov; Russian: Ардальон Вениаминович Баранов	93rd Rifle Regiment	Lieutenant	31 May 1945	—
Vasily Baranov; Russian: Василий Андреевич Баранов	1st Guards Mechanized Brigade	Guards Captain	29 June 1945	—
Viktor Ilyich Baranov; Russian: Виктор Ильич Баранов	13th Light Tank Brigade	Colonel	21 March 1940	—
Viktor Kirillovich Baranov; Russian: Виктор Кириллович Баранов	1st Guards Cavalry Corps	Lieutenant-General	29 May 1945	—
Volodymyr Baranov; Ukrainian: Володимир Петрович Баранов	111th Rifle Regiment	Lieutenant	15 January 1944	—
Ivan Egorovich Baranov; Russian: Иван Егорович Баранов	135th Separate Reconnaissance Company	Senior Lieutenant	27 February 1945	—
Ivan Efimovich Baranov; Russian: Иван Ефимович Баранов	807th Aviation Assault Regiment	Senior Lieutenant	23 February 1945	—
Ivan Mikhailovich Baranov; Russian: Иван Михайлович Баранов	487th Rifle Regiment	Senior Lieutenant	27 February 1945	—
Mikhail Dmitrievich Baranov; Russian: Михаил Дмитриевич Баранов	183rd Fighter Regiment	Senior Lieutenant	12 August 1942	—
Mikhail Pavlovich Baranov; Russian: Михаил Павлович Баранов	239th Guards Rifle Regiment	Guards Junior Sergeant	15 January 1944	—
Mikhail Semyonovich Baranov; Russian: Михаил Семёнович Баранов	157th Fighter Aviation Regiment	Junior Lieutenant	24 August 1943	—
Nikolai Andreevich Baranov; Russian: Николай Андреевич Баранов	213th Rifle Division	Lieutenant Colonel	26 October 1943	—
Nikolai Artemovich Baranov; Russian: Николай Артёмович Баранов	1st Separate Detachment	Senior Seaman	31 May 1945	—
Nikolai Vasilievich Baranov; Russian: Николай Васильевич Баранов	1372nd Rifle Regiment	Lieutenant Colonel	24 March 1945	—
Pyotr Aleksandrovich Baranov; Russian: Пётр Александрович Баранов	139th Tank Regiment	Senior Lieutenant	22 February 1944	—
Pyotr Grigorievich Baranov; Russian: Пётр Григорьевич Баранов	5th Guards Bomber Aviation Regiment	Guards Junior Lieutenant	31 December 1942	—
Vasily Baranyuk; Ukrainian: Василь Никифорович Баранюк	108th Tank Brigade	Colonel	31 May 1945	—
Aleksandr Barayulin; Russian: Александр Адамович Бараулин	22nd Guards Artillery Regiment	Guards Senior Lieutenant	1 November 1943	—
Dmitry Barashev; Russian: Дмитрий Иванович Барашев	752nd Bomber Aviation Regiment	Senior Lieutenant	25 March 1943	—
Feoktist Barabasov; Russian: Феоктист Александрович Барбасов	1178th Rifle Regiment	Lieutenant Colonel	23 September 1944	—
Pyotr Barbashev; Russian: Пётр Парфёнович Барбашев	34th Motorized Rifle Regiment	Lance Sergeant	13 December 1942 †	Killed in action on 9 November 1942 after using body as human shield to cover a bunker
Mikhail Barbashinov; Russian: Михаил Никанорович Барбашинов	37th Assault Aviation Regiment	Major	14 September 1945	—
Nikolai Barbolin; Russian: Николай Степанович Барболин	115th Guards Fighter and Anti-Tank Artillery Regiment	Guards Senior Sergeant	26 October 1943	—
Oleksiy Barvinsky; Ukrainian: Олексій Дмитрович Барвінський	691st Artillery Regiment	Lieutenant	24 December 1943	—
Aleksandr Bardanov; Russian: Александр Иванович Барданов	39th Artillery Cannon Brigade	Senior Lieutenant	9 October 1943	—
Aleksandr Bardeev; Russian: Александр Петрович Бардеев	366th Close-range Bomber Aviation Regiment	Major	13 December 1942	—
Pavlo Bardjukov; Ukrainian: Павло Лаврентійович Бардуков	305th Guards Rifle Regiment	Red Army Guard	24 March 1945	—
Evgeny Barilovich; Russian: Евгений Алексеевич Барилович	Soviet Black Sea Fleet	Captain	10 January 1979	—
David Barinov; Russian: Давид Маркович Баринов	26th Guards Mechanized Brigade	Guards Major-General	17 October 1943	—
Ivan Barinov; Russian: Иван Михайлович Баринов	101st Mortar Regiment	Senior Lieutenant	24 March 1945 †	Killed in action on 24 August 1944
Nikolai Barinov; Russian: Николай Михайлович Баринов	95th Rifle Regiment	Junior platoon commander	25 October 1938	—
Mikhail Barkov; Russian: Михаил Иванович Барков	73rd Guards Separate Anti-tank Battalion	Red Army Guard	22 July 1944	—
Nikolai Barkov; Russian: Николай Фёдорович Барков	1050th Rifle Regiment	Senior Lieutenant	31 May 1945	—
Sergey Barkov; Russian: Сергей Егорович Барков	111th Separate Reconnaissance Company	Senior Sergeant	13 September 1944	—
Viktor Barkovsky; Russian: Виктор Антонович Барковский	591st Fighter Aviation Regiment	Junior Lieutenant	14 February 1943 †	Killed in action on 20 May 1942
Ilya Barmin; Russian: Илья Елизарович Бармин	23rd Tank Brigade	Junior Political Instructor	12 April 1942	—
Andrey Barsky; Russian: Андрей Иванович Барский	12th Guards Dive Bomber Aviation Regiment	Guards Captain	15 May 1946	—
Aleksandr Barsukov; Russian: Александр Яковлевич Барсуков	8th Guards Independent Motorized Battalion	Guard Lieutenant	31 May 1945	—
Vasily Barsukov; Russian: Василий Николаевич Барсуков	18th Guards Fighter Aviation Regiment	Guards Captain	19 April 1945	—
Ivan Barsukov; Russian: Иван Петрович Барсуков	35th Border Detachment	Major	11 August 1983	—
Mikhail Barsukov; Russian: Михаил Михайлович Барсуков	3rd Belorussian Front	Colonel-General	19 April 1945	—
Makar Bartashou; Belarusian: Макар Уласавіч Барташоў	12th Assault Air Division	Colonel	14 September 1945	—
Razhen Bartsits; Russian: Ражден Михайлович Барциц	Azov Naval Flotilla	Red Navy Man	16 May 1944	—
Daniil Barchenkov; Russian: Даниил Гаврилович Барченков	897th Fighter Regiment	Major	29 June 1945	—
Ivan Barchenko-Yemelyanov; Russian: Иван Павлович Барченко-Емельянов	Reconnaissance Detachment of the Northern Fleet	Captain	5 November 1944	—
Abrek Barsht; Russian: Абрек Аркадьевич Баршт	118th Separate Reconnaissance Aviation Regiment	Major	10 April 1945	—
Georgiy Barykin; Russian: Георгий Филиппович Барыкин	144th Anti-tank Artillery Regiment	Captain	4 June 1944	—
Gennadi Barykov; Russian: Геннадий Иванович Барыков	753rd Rifle Regiment	Senior Sergeant	29 June 1945	—
Arkadi Baryshev; Russian: Аркадий Фёдорович Барышев	300th Guards Rifle Regiment	Red Army Guard	21 July 1944	—
Nikolai Baryshev; Russian: Николай Герасимович Барышев	1007th Light Artillery Regiment	Red Army man	29 March 1944	—
Bator Basanov; Russian: Батор Манджиевич Басанов	93rd Guards Rifle Regiment	Guard Senior Sergeant	24 March 1945	—
Pyotr Basyankou; Belarusian: Пётр Харытонавіч Басянкоў	326th Tank Battalion	Senior Sergeant	24 March 1945	—
Vladimir Basinsky; Russian: Владимир Лукьянович Басинский	165th Guards Ground Attack Aviation Regiment	Guards Lieutenant	18 August 1945	—
Vladimir Baskov; Russian: Владимир Сергеевич Басков	291st Fighter Regiment	Major	23 February 1948	—
Mikhail Baskov; Russian: Михаил Николаевич Басков	51st Separate Motorized Battalion	Corporal	13 September 1944	—
Sergei Baskov; Russian: Сергей Павлович Басков	562nd Rifle Regiment	Major	29 June 1945	—
Vladimir Basmanov; Russian: Владимир Иванович Басманов	2nd Engineering Company	Senior Lieutenant	29 June 1945	—
Gavriil Basmanov; Russian: Гавриил Иванович Басманов	360th Rifle Regiment	Red Army man	16 October 1943	—
Ivan Basov; Russian: Иван Сидорович Басов	26th Anti-tank Artillery Brigade	Colonel	23 September 1944	—
Fyodor Basov; Russian: Фёдор Евсеевич Басов	1893rd Separate Artillery Regiment	Lieutenant Colonel	10 January 1944	—
Mihran Bastanjyan; Armenian: միհրան Բոստանջյան	1118th Rifle Regiment	Red Army man	22 February 1944	—
Ivan Basteev; Russian: Иван Васильевич Бастеев	89th Rifle Regiment	Colonel	25 October 1943	—
Arsenti Bastrakov; Russian: Арсентий Михайлович Бастраков	191st Guards Rifle Regiment	Guards Sergeant-Major	5 October 1944 †	Committed suicide in action with last grenade on 17 February 144
Georgiy Bastrakov; Russian: Георгий Фёдорович Бастраков	15th Guards Airborne Regiment	Guard Lieutenant	17 October 1943	—
Evgeni Basulin; Russian: Евгений Дмитриевич Басулин	239th Fighter Aviation Regiment	Captain	28 September 1943	—
Pyotr Batavin; Russian: Пётр Фёдорович Батавин	126th Guards Rifle Regiment	Red Army Guard	24 March 1945	—
Ryhor Batalau; Belarusian: Рыгор Міхайлавіч Баталаў	229th Guards Rifle Regiment	Guards Major	26 October 1943	—
Fyodor Batalov; Russian: Фёдор Алексеевич Баталов	437th Rifle Regiment	Captain	9 August 1941	—
Mikhail Batarov; Russian: Михаил Фёдорович Батаров	611th Fighter Aviation Regiment	Major	18 August 1945	—
Gilyfan Batarshin; Tatar: Гыйльфан Батыршин	NKVD	Junior Commander	25 October 1938	—
Nikolai Batashev; Russian: Николай Иванович Баташев	128th Mortar Regiment	Senior Sergeant	10 January 1944	—
Vasil Bateha; Ukrainian: Василь Афанасійович Батеха	282nd Guards Rifle Regiment	Guards Lieutenant	22 February 1944	—
Oleksiy Batievsky; Ukrainian: Олексій Михайлович Батиевский	35th Aviation Assault Regiment	Senior Lieutenant	6 March 1945	—
Sergei Batinkov; Russian: Сергей Алексеевич Батиньков	208th Aviation Assault Regiment	Captain	29 June 1945	—
Pavel Batitsky; Ukrainian: Павло Федорович Батицький	Chief of Staff	General	7 May 1965	—
Vladimir Batov; Russian: Владимир Васильевич Батов	734th Rifle Regiment	Captain	24 March 1945	—
Pavel Batov; Russian: Павел Иванович Батов	65th Army	Lieutenant-General; Colonel-General	3 October 1943; 2 June 1945	Twice Hero of the Soviet Union
Matvei Batrakov; Russian: Матвей Степанович Батраков	765th Rifle Regiment	Lieutenant-Colonel	11 September 1941	—
Mikhail Batrakou; Belarusian: Міхаіл Рыгоравіч Батракоў	120th Separate Tank Brigade	Senior Lieutenant	24 March 1945	—
Mariya Batrakova; Russian: Мария Степановна Батракова	463rd Rifle Regiment	Junior Lieutenant	19 March 1944	—
Mikhail Batukov; Russian: Михаил Сергеевич Батуков	104th Separate Battalion	Senior Sergeant	22 February 1944	—
Aleksandr Baturin Russian: Александр Герасимович Батурин	71st Aviation Regiment	Senior Lieutenant	23 October 1942	—
Nikolai Baturin Russian: Николай Павлович Батурин	36th Guards Tank Brigade	Guards Lieutenant	24 March 1945	—
Pyotr Batyrev Russian: Пётр Михайлович Батырев	163rd Guards Fighter Aviation Regiment	Guards Captain	23 February 1945 †	Killed in action on 30 September 1944
Sergei Batyshev Russian: Сергей Яковлевич Батышев	545th Rifle Regiment	Major	23 September 1944	—
Vasily Batyaev Russian: Василий Сергеевич Батяев	53rd Guards Fighter Aviation Regiment	Captain	15 May 1946	
Stepan Bakhaiev; Russian: Степан Антонович Бахаев	523rd Fighter Aviation Regiment	Captain	13 November 1951	—
Vasily Bakharev; Russian: Василий Никифорович Бахарев	42nd Rifle Regiment	Red Army man	29 October 1943	—
Ivan Bakharev; Russian: Иван Иванович Бахарев	267th Guards Rifle Regiment	Guards Senior Sergeant	20 December 1943 †	Killed in action on 30 September 1943
Pyotr Bakharev; Russian: Пётр Михайлович Бахарев	239th Guards Rifle Regiment	Guards Lieutenant	15 January 1944	—
Georgi Bakhvalov; Russian: Георгий Павлович Бахвалов	11th Separate Reconnaissance Aviation Regiment	Captain	4 February 1940	—
Valentin Bakhvalov; Russian: Валентин Николаевич Бахвалов	12th Guards Rifle Division	Guards Major	31 May 1945	—
Vasily Bakhvalov; Russian: Василий Петрович Бахвалов	2nd Bomber Aviation Regiment	Junior Commander	15 January 1940	—
Vladimir Bakhirev; Russian: Владимир Николаевич Бахирев	176th Guards Rifle Regiment	Guards Captain	3 June 1944 †	Killed self and surrounding enemy forces with last grenade on 9 February 1944
Ivan Bakhmetev; Russian: Иван Андреянович Бахметьев	120th Rifle Regiment	Colonel	30 October 1943	—
Grigory Bakhtadze; Georgian: გიორგი ბახტაძე	1038th Rifle Regiment	Lieutenant	3 June 1944	—
Aleksandr Bakhtin; Russian: Александр Егорович Бахтин	615th Rifle Regiment	Senior Lieutenant	10 January 1944	—
Ivan Bakhtin; Russian: Иван Павлович Бахтин	190th Aviation Assault Regiment	Lieutenant Colonel	18 August 1945	—
Mikhail Bakhtin; Russian: Михаил Иванович Бахтин	43rd Guards Ground Attack Air Regiment	Guards Lieutenant	23 February 1945	—
Semyon Bakhtin; Russian: Семён Алексеевич Бахтин	667th Rifle Regiment	Junior Lieutenant	3 June 1944	—
Dmitro Bachinsky; Ukrainian: Дмитро Григорович Бачинський	3rd Artillery Division	Captain	10 April 1945	—
Vasily Bachurin; Russian: Василий Иванович Бачурин	384th Separate Marine Rifle Battalion	Starshina 1st class	20 April 1945 †	Killed in action on 27 March 1944
Fedor Bachurin; Russian: Фёдор Игнатьевич Бачурин	3rd Tank Battalion	Guard Lieutenant	29 June 1945 †	Killed in action on 11 January 1945
Ivan Basharin; Russian: Иван Васильевич Башарин	810th Assault Aviation Regiment	Senior Lieutenant	19 August 1944	—
Aleksandr Bashkin; Russian: Александр Иванович Башкин	436th Separate Anti-tank Fighter Battalion	Senior Sergeant	18 November 1944	—
Fedor Bashkirov; Russian: Фёдор Андреевич Башкиров	62nd Attack Aviation Regiment	Captain	1 July 1944	—
Ivan Bashkirov; Russian: Иван Сергеевич Башкиров	487th Rifle Regiment	Sergeant	27 February 1945	—
Viktor Bashkirov; Russian: Виктор Андреевич Башкиров	519th Fighter Aviation Regiment	Captain	4 February 1944	—
Vyacheslav Bashkirov; Russian: Вячеслав Филиппович Башкиров	788th Fighter Aviation Regiment	Political Instructor	8 February 1943	—
Ivan Bashmanov; Russian: Иван Андреевич Башманов	1052nd Rifle Regiment	Captain	15 May 1946	—
Andrey Bashtyrkov; Russian: Андрей Андреевич Баштырков	24th Mine-Torpedo Aviation Regiment	Captain	22 February 1943 †	Killed in action on 14 January 1943
Oleksandr Bashchenko; Ukrainian: Олександр Петрович Бащенко	1st tank battalion	Lieutenant	24 March 1944 †	Killed in action on 10 October 1944
Pyotr Bajuk; Ukrainian: Петро Ксенофонтович Баюк	229th Rifle Regiment	Captain	5 October 1943 †	Killed in action on 5 October 1943
Nikolai Bevs; Russian: Николай Сидорович Бевз	201st Mortar Regiment	Junior Lieutenant	10 January 1944	—
Talgat Bigeldinov; Kazakh: Талғат Жақыпбекұлы Бигелдинов	44th Guards Ground Attack Air Regiment	Guards Senior Lieutenant, Guards Captain	26 October 1944; 27 June 1945	Twice Hero of the Soviet Union
Madi Begenov; Kazakh: Мәди Қайбиұлы Бегенов	619th Rifle Regiment	Sergeant	19 March 1944	—
Valentin Beglov; Russian: Валентин Алексеевич Беглов	959th Rifle Regiment	Captain	27 June 1945 †	Killed in action 7 March 1945
Boris Begoulev; Russian: Борис Петрович Бегоулев	120th Rifle Regiment	Medic	25 October 1938	—
Leonid Beda; Ukrainian: Леонід Гнатович Біда	5th Guards Ground Attack Air Regiment	Guards Senior Lieutenant, Guards Major	26 October 1944 29 June 1945	Twice Hero of the Soviet Union
Efim Bedin; Russian: Ефим Васильевич Бедин	253rd Rifle Division	Major-General	23 October 1943	—
Ivan Bedin; Russian: Иван Петрович Бедин	1372nd Anti-aircraft Artillery Regiment	Major	10 April 1945	—
Stepan Bidnenko; Ukrainian: Степан Петрович Бідненко	51st Guards Tank Regiment	Guard Lieutenant	27 June 1945	—
Nikolai Bedrenko; Russian: Николай Васильевич Бедренко	7th Guards Airborne Regiment	Guard Corporal	28 April 1945	—
Mikhail Bedrishev; Russian: Михаил Александрович Бедрышев	1140th Rifle Regiment	Red Army Man	10 January 1944	—
Vladimir Bezbokov; Russian: Владимир Михайлович Безбоков	7th Guards Aviation Regiment	Guard Captain	29 June 1945	—
Vasily Bezborodov; Russian: Василий Петрович Безбородов	64th Guards Tank Brigade	Guards Major	31 May 1945	—
Oleksei Bezverkhy; Ukrainian: Олексій Гнатович Безверхий	156th Guards Fighter Aviation Regiment	Guards Senior Lieutenant	27 June 1945	—
Vitaliy Bezgalosov; Russian: Виталий Мефодьевич Безголосов	227th Rifle Regiment	Sergeant-Major	15 May 1946 †	Killed in action 30 April 1945
Anatoliy Bezdvorny; Ukrainian: Анатолій Андрійович Бездворный	1972nd Anti-tank Artillery Regiment	Red Army Man	24 March 1945	—
Vasil Bezmenov; Ukrainian: Василь Іванович Безменов	915th Artillery Regiment	Senior Lieutenant	31 March 1943 †	Killed in action on 4 January 1943
Vasily Bezmenov; Russian: Василий Иванович Безменов	49th Guards Tank Brigade	Guard Sergeant-Major	27 February 1945	—
Ivan Beznoskov; Russian: Иван Захарович Безносков	333rd Guards Rifle Regiment	Guard Captain	10 April 1945	—
Grigory Bezobrazov; Russian: Григорий Иванович Безобразов	10th Guards Aviation Regiment	Guard Senior Lieutenant	18 September 1943	—
Grigory Bezrodnyh; Ukrainian: Григорій Михійович Безродних	1075th Rifle Regiment	Red Army Man	21 July 1942 †	Killed in action 16 November 1941
Nikolai Bezrukov; Russian: Николай Григорьевич Безруков	1st Tank Battalion	Major	17 October 1943	—
Filipp Bezrukov; Russian: Филипп Иванович Безруков	10th Separate Guards Battalion	Red Army Guard	4 June 1944 †	Killed in action 12 May 1943
Grigory Bezuglov; Ukrainian: Григорій Вікторович Безуглов	60th Guards Cavalry Regiment	Guard Captain	15 January 1944	—
Vladimir Bezuglyi; Russian: Владимир Андреевич Безуглый	310th Rifle Regiment	Red Army Man	16 October 1943	—
Vladimir Bezukladnikov; Russian: Владимир Николаевич Безукладников	1118th Rifle Regiment	Junior Lieutenant	22 February 1944	—
Mikhail Bezukh; Russian: Михаил Иванович Безух	565th Assault Aviation Regiment	Major	1 July 1944	—
Viktor Beztsinnyi; Ukrainian: Віктор Миколайович Безцінний	685th Rifle Regiment	Lieutenant	30 October 1943	—
Ivan Beida; Ukrainian: Іван Мартинович Бейда	178th Tank Brigade	Junior Lieutenant	10 January 1944	—
Mikhail Bekashonok; Russian: Михаил Васильевич Бекашонок	129th Guards Fighter Aviation Regiment	Guard Captain	27 June 1945	—
Serikqazi Bekbosinov; Kazakh: Серікқазы Бекбосынов	300th Guards Rifle Regiment	Red Army Guard	27 July 1944	—
Vasily Beketov; Russian: Василий Семёнович Бекетов	170th Guards Rifle Regiment	Guards Senior Sergeant	24 March 1945	—
Mikhail Beketov; Russian: Михаил Иванович Бекетов	733rd Rifle Regiment	Junior Lieutenant	7 April 1940	—
Nikolai Belevin; Russian: Николай Иванович Белавин	33rd Guards Ground Attack Air Regiment	Guard Captain	26 October 1944	—
Sergei Belan; Russian: Сергей Абрамович Белан	74th Separate Motoroized Battalion	Senior Sergeant	13 September 1944	—
Nikolai Belashev; Russian: Николай Никонорович Белашев	1075th Rifle Regiment	Red Army Man	21 July 1942 †	Killed in action 16 November 1941
Fedor Belevich; Russian: Фёдор Николаевич Белевич	738th Rifle Regiment	Red Army Man	31 May 1945	—
Vasil Bilenko; Ukrainian: Василь Данилович Біленко	282nd Guards Rifle Regiment	Guards Junior Sergeant	22 February 1944	—
Yuri Belenogov; Russian: Юрий Сергеевич Беленогов	119th Tank Regiment	Junior Lieutenant	3 June 1944 †	Killed in action 2 September 1943
Vera Belik; Ukrainian: Віра Лук'янівна Білик	46th Guards Night Bomber Aviation Regiment	Guard Lieutenant	23 February 1944 †	Killed in action on 25 August 1944
Pyotr Belik; Ukrainian: Петро Олексійович Білик	8th Separate Motorized Regiment	Lieutenant Colonel	14 February 1943	—
Vasily Belikov; Russian: Василий Иванович Беликов	1st Motorized Rifle Battalion	Guard Sergeant	24 April 1944	—
Viktor Belikov; Russian: Виктор Матвеевич Беликов	109th Guards Ground Attack Aviation Regiment	Guard Senior Lieutenant	27 June 1945	—
Oleh Belykov; Ukrainian: Олег Степанович Бєліков	19th Separate Fighter Aviation Regiment	Captain	19 August 1944	—
Pyotr Belykov; Ukrainian: Петро Васильович Бєліков	240th Separate Reconnaissance Aviation Squadron	Senior Lieutenant	21 July 1942	—
Sergei Belikov; Russian: Сергей Иосифович Беликов	341st Separate Sapper Battalion	Major	24 March 1945 †	Killed in action on 12 November 1944
Zakariya Belibayev; Kazakh: Закария Белібаев	18th Separate Pontoon-and-Bridge Battalion	Red Army Man	17 October 1943	—
Efim Belinsky; Russian: Ефим Семёнович Белинский	113th Artillery Regiment	Lieutenant	24 March 1945 †	Killed in action on 16 December 1944
Aleksandr Belkin; Russian: Александр Никитович Белкин	164th Fighter Aviation Regiment	Senior Lieutenant	4 February 1944	—
Afanasy Beloborodov; Russian: Афанасий Павлантьевич Белобородов	Commander of the 43rd Army	Lieutenant-General	22 July 1944 19 April 1945	Twice Hero of the Soviet Union
Aleksandr Kuzmich Belov; Russian: Александр Кузьмич Белов	1124th Rifle Regiment	Starshina	22 July 1944	—
Aleksandr Fyodorovich Belov; Russian: Александр Фёдорович Белов	346th Rifle Regiment	Senior Sergeant	24 March 1945	—
Aleksei Efimovich Belov; Russian: Александр Фёдорович Белов	667th Rifle Regiment	Senior Lieutenant	3 June 1944	—
Aleksei Ivanovich Belov; Russian: Алексей Ефимович Белов	29th Guards Rifle Regiment	Guard Corporal	15 January 1944	—
Arkady Belov; Russian: Аркадий Степанович Белов	931st Rifle Regiment	Junior Lieutenant	13 November 1943	—
Vasily Mikhailovich Belov; Russian: Василий Михайлович Белов	11th Motorized Rifle Brigade	Red Army Man	23 October 1943	—
Vasily Timofeevich Belov; Russian: Василий Тимофеевич Белов	1292nd Rifle Regiment	Red Army Man	3 June 1944 †	Killed in action on 25 March 1944
Grigory Belov; Russian: Григорий Андреевич Белов	16th Guards Chernigov Cavalry Division	Guards Colonel	15 January 1944	—
Yevtikhy Belov; Russian: Евтихий Емельянович Белов	10th Guards Tank Corps	Guard Lieutenant-General	29 May 1945	—
Ivan Leonovich Belov; Russian: Иван Леонович Белов	631st Rifle Regiment	Captain	24 March 1945	—
Ivan Mikhailovich Belov; Russian: Иван Михайлович Белов	5th Mixed Aviation Regiment	Lieutenant	5 February 1940	—
Mikhail Belov; Russian: Михаил Алексеевич Белов	965th Rifle Regiment	Major	24 March 1945	—
Nikolai Belov; Russian: Николай Максимович Белов	424th Tank Battalion	Guard Lieutenant	10 January 1944	—
Pavel Belov; Russian: Павел Алексеевич Белов	61st Army of the Central Front	Lieutenant-General	15 January 1944	—
Fedor Belov; Russian: Фёдор Иванович Белов	683rd Artillery Regiment	Senior Sergeant	10 April 1945	—
Yuri Belov; Russian: Юрий Николаевич Белов	68th Mechanized Brigade	Senior Sergeant	29 June 1945	—
Oleksandr Belygurov; Ukrainian: Олександр Іванович Бєлогуров	57th High-Speed Bomber Aviation Regiment	Sergeant-Major	7 February 1940	—
Aleksandr Belodedov; Russian: Александр Иванович Белодедов	1042nd Rifle Regiment	Major	31 May 1945 †	Killed in action on 12 March 1945
Vasily Belozertsev; Russian: Василий Дмитриевич Белозерцев	29th Rifle Regiment	Lance Sergeant	16 October 1943	—
Nikolai Belozertsev; Russian: Николай Александрович Белозерцев	955th Rifle Regiment Reconnaissance Squadron	Senior Sergeant	10 January 1944	—
Ivan Belozerov; Russian: Иван Павлович Белозёров	6th Guards Fighter Aviation Regiment	Guards Senior Lieutenant	16 May 1944	—
Mykhailo Biloivanenko; Ukrainian: Михайло Іванович Білоіваненко	133rd Separate Guards Communication Battalion	Guard Sergeant	26 October 1943	—
Kumza Bilokin; Ukrainian: Кузьма Филимонович Білокінь	103rd Assault Aviation Regiment	Captain	26 October 1944	—
Pyotr Belokon; Russian: Пётр Ксенофонтович Белоконь	117th Anti-Tank Fighter Battalion	Senior Sergeant	21 February 1945	—
Dmitry Belokopytov; Russian: Дмитрий Иванович Белокопытов	592nd Rifle Regiment	Red Army Man	19 March 1944	—
Vladimir Belomestnykh; Russian: Владимир Корнилович Беломестных	12th Separate Sapper Battalion	Sergeant-Major	30 October 1943	—
Grigory Belomutov; Russian: Григорий Тихонович Беломутов	705th Rifle Regiment	Red Army Man	17 October 1943	—
Mark Bilonozhko; Ukrainian: Марк Миколайович Білоножко	42nd Separate Sapper-Engineer Battalion	Captain	17 October 1943 †	Killed in action on 26 September 1943
Ivan Belopolsky; Russian: Иван Павлович Белопольский	529th Rifle Regiment	Red Army Man	29 October 1943	—
Yevstrat Belopukhov; Russian: Евстрат Степанович Белопухов	1033rd Rifle Regiment	Lieutenant	17 October 1943	—
Vladimir Belorossov; Russian: Владимир Александрович Белороссов	181st Panzer Brigade	Junior Lieutenant	10 March 1944	—
Anton Bilous; Ukrainian: Антон Іванович Білоус	810th Attack Air Regiment	Lieutenant	15 May 1946	—
Volodymyr Bilous; Ukrainian: Володимир Микитович Білоус	142nd Cannon Artillery Brigade	Lieutenant	24 March 1945	—
Vasily Ignatievich Belousov; Russian: Василий Игнатьевич Белоусов	15th Separate Motorized Pontoon-Bridge Battalion	Lieutenant	10 January 1944	—
Vasily Savelievich Belousov; Russian: Василий Савельевич Белоусов	212th Guards Rifle Regiment	Red Army Guard	17 January 1943	—
Vitaly Belousov; Russian: Виталий Фёдорович Белоусов	666th Artillery Regiment	Major	31 May 1945	—
Vladimir Belousov; Russian: Владимир Игнатьевич Белоусов	9th Assault Aviation Regiment	Captain	21 March 1940	—
Leonid Belousov; Russian: Леонид Георгиевич Белоусов	4th Guards Fighter Aviation Regiment	Guard Major	10 April 1957	—
Mikhail Ignatievich Belousov; Russian: Михаил Игнатьевич Белоусов	1179th Rifle Regiment	Lieutenant	26 October 1943	—
Nikolai Belousov; Russian: Николай Петрович Белоусов	193rd Fighter Aviation Regiment	Lieutenant	1 July 1944	—
Pavel Belousov; Russian: Павел Александрович Белоусов	269th Rifle Regiment	Red Army Man	10 January 1944	—
Stepan Belousov; Russian: Степан Мартынович Белоусов	233rd Guards Rifle Regiment	Guard Captain	26 October 1943 †	Killed in action 17 October 1943
Ivan Bilousko; Russian: Іван Васильович Білоусько	45th Guards Tank Brigade	Guard Senior Lieutenant	31 May 1945	—
Klavdi Beloshapkin; Russian: Клавдий Флегонтович Белошапкин	196th Guards Artillery Regiment	Guards Junior Lieutenant	20 December 1943	—
Andrej Bjely; Belarusian: Андрэй Анісімавіч Белы	685th Rifle Regiment	Junior Lieutenant	30 October 1943	—
Danylo Bilyj; Ukrainian: Данило Микитович Білий	8th Guards Mechanized Brigade	Guard Colonel	25 October 1943	—
Spiridon Belyj; Russian: Спиридон Ефимович Белый	150th Guards Fighter and Anti-Tank Artillery Regiment	Guard Lieutenant	19 March 1944	—
Josip Bіlih; Ukrainian: Йосип Назарович Білих	2nd Guards Cavalry Division	Guards Colonel	27 June 1945	—
Andrey Belgin; Russian: Андрей Антонович Бельгин	214th Guards Rifle Regiment	Guard Captain	1 November 1943 †	Killed in action on 6 July 1943
Aleksi Belsky; Russian: Алексей Ильич Бельский	273rd Guards Rifle Regiment	Guard Major	27 February 1945	—
Iosif Belskih; Russian: Иосиф Михайлович Бельских	145th Separate Fighter and Anti-tank Battalion	Senior Sergeant	3 June 1944	—
Feodosij Bilchenko; Ukrainian: Феодосій Лукич Більченко	218th Guards Rifle Regiment	Guard Senior Sergeant	27 February 1945	—
Vitalij Belyuzhenko; Ukrainian: Віталій Степанович Белюженко	KGB	Colonel of the State Security of the USSR	24 November 1980	—
Evel Belyavin; Russian: Евель Самуилович Белявин	80th Guards Bomber Aviation Regiment	Guard Senior Lieutenant	4 February 1944	—
Boris Belyavsky; Russian: Борис Васильевич Белявский	19th Guards Mortar Brigade	Guard Sergeant	10 April 1945	—
Nikolai Belyavsky; Russian: Николай Иванович Белявский	147th Guards Rifle Regiment	Guard Senior Sergeant	3 June 1944	—
Semyon Belyavsky; Russian: Семён Логвинович Белявский	100th Guards Rifle Regiment	Guard Lieutenant	24 March 1945	—
Aleksandr Belyaev; Chuvash: Александр Филиппович Беляев	41st Guards Rifle Division	Guard Lieutenant Colonel	20 December 1943	—
Boris Belyaev; Russian: Борис Владимирович Беляев	246th Guards Rifle Regiment	Guard Major	24 March 1945	—
Vasily Belyaev; Russian: Василий Александрович Беляев	61st Guards Rifle Regiment	Guards Junior Lieutenant	29 June 1945	—
Vladimir Aleksandrovich Belyaev; Russian: Владимир Александрович Беляев	120th Guards Rifle Regiment	Guard Captain	22 February 1944	—
Vladimir Maksimovich Belyaev; Russian: Владимир Максимович Беляев	282nd Guards Rifle Regiment	Guard Senior Sergeant	20 December 1943	—
Vladimir Prokofievich Belyaev; Russian: Владимир Прокофьевич Беляев	78th Guards Rifle Regiment	Guard Senior Sergeant	22 February 1944	—
Vyacheslav Belyaev; Russian: Вячеслав Васильевич Беляев	1st Guards Tank Brigade	Guard Senior Lieutenant	27 February 1945	—
Ivan Belyaev; Russian: Иван Потапович Беляев	685th Rifle Regiment	Lieutenant	24 March 1945	—
Irinei Belyaev; Russian: Ириней Фёдорович Беляев	27th Guards Fighter Aviation Regiment	Guard Captain	5 May 1991 †	Killed in action on 8 July 1943
Lavrentiy Belyaev; Russian: Лаврентий Семёнович Беляев	280th Guards Rifle Regiment	Guard Junior Lieutenant	22 February 1944 †	Killed in action on 1 October 1943
Pyotr Belyaev; Russian: Пётр Михайлович Беляев	22nd Guards Motorized Rifle Brigade	Guard Major	27 June 1945	—
Yakov Belyaev; Russian: Яков Дмитриевич Беляев	69th Separate Reconnaissance Battalion	Sergeant	31 August 1941 †	Killed in action on 6 July 1941
Aleksandr Belyakov; Russian: Александр Васильевич Беляков	Special-Purpose Army No.1	Military Engineer 1st Class	24 July 1936	—
Ivan Dementevich Belyakov; Russian: Иван Дементьевич Беляков	793rd Rifle Regiment	Senior Lieutenant	26 October 1943 †	Killed in action on 15 October 1943
Ivan Fedorovich Belyakov; Russian: Иван Фёдорович Беляков	37th Guards Rifle Regiment	Red Army Guard	31 May 1945	—
Ivan Yakovlevich Belyakov; Russian: Иван Яковлевич Беляков	594th Assault Aviation Regiment	Senior Lieutenant	18 August 1945	—
Nikolai Belyakov; Russian: Николай Александрович Беляков	386th Separate Marine Battalion	Captain	17 November 1943	—
Vasily Belyandra; Russian: Василий Яковлевич Беляндра	23rd Guards Motorized Rifle Brigade	Guard Junior Lieutenant	17 November 1943	—
Pyotr Belyanik; Russian: Петро Никифорович Белясник	126th Fighter Aviation Regiment	Captain	28 April 1943	—
Vasily Benberin; Russian: Василий Митрофанович Бенберин	44th Guards Tank Brigade	Guard Junior Lieutenant	27 February 1945	—
Fedir Bendeberya; Ukrainian: Федір Кузьмич Бендеберя	1st Rifle Battalion	Guard Lieutenant	24 March 1945	—
Chichiko Bendeliani; Georgian: ჭიჭიკო კაიაროვიჩი ბენდელიანი	54th Guards Fighter Aviation Regiment	Guard Major	24 August 1943	—
Stepan Bendikov; Ukrainian: Степан Михайлович Бендиков	107th Artillery Regiment	Lieutenant Colonel	31 May 1945	—
Aleksei Benevolensky; Russian: Алексей Павлович Беневоленский	558th Howitzer Artillery Regiment	Lieutenant	18 November 1944	—
Nikolai Benesh; Russian: Николай Алексеевич Бенеш	205th Guards Rifle Regiment	Guard Lieutenant	16 October 1943	—
Viktor Benke; Russian: Виктор Владимирович Бенке	9th Guards Tank Brigade	Guard Senior Lieutenant	27 February 1945	—
Ivan Berbetov; Russian: Иван Петрович Бербетов	20th Panzer Brigade	Senior Lieutenant	24 March 1945	—
Aleksandr Berbeshkin; Russian: Александр Андреевич Бербешкин	203rd Guards Rifle Regiment	Guard Major	16 October 1943	—
Geli Berdin; Bashkir: Ғәли Иркәбай улы Бирҙин	280th Guards Rifle Regiment	Guard Captain	22 February 1944	—
Leonid Berdichevsky; Russian: Леонид Афанасьевич Бердичевский	64th Guards Independent Tank Regiment	Guard Lieutenant Colonel	24 March 1945 †	Killed in action on 31 July 1944
Gavriil Berdnikov; Russian: Гавриил Васильевич Бердников	100th Guards Rifle Regiment	Guard Senior Lieutenant	24 March 1945	—
Nikolai Berdnikov; Russian: Николай Анфимович Бердников	328th Artillery Regiment	Senior Sergeant	15 May 1946	—
Dmitry Berdov; Russian: Дмитрий Михайлович Бердов	78th Rifle Regiment	Senior Lieutenant	25 August 1944 †	Killed in action on 4 January 1944
Vasily Berdyshev; Russian: Василий Архипович Бердышев	696th Separate Sapper Battalion	Corporal	30 October 1943	—
Georgy Beregovoy; Ukrainian: Гео́ргій Тимофі́йович Берегови́й	90th Guards Ground Attack Aviation Regiment; Soyuz 3	Guard Captain; Cosmonaut	26 October 1944; 1 November 1968	Both soldier and cosmonaut
Nikolai Berezhkov; Russian: Николай Борисович Бережков	807th Assault Aviation Regiment	Lieutenant	18 August 1945	—
Ivan Berezhnoy; Ukrainian: Іван Михайлович Бережной	261st Guards Rifle Regiment	Guard Junior Lieutenant	24 March 1945 †	Killed in action on 10 April 1944
Mykola Berezhnyj; Ukrainian: Микола Іванович Бережний	398th Artillery Regiment	Sergeant-Major	23 September 1944	—
Grigory Berezhok; Ukrainian: Григорій Карпович Бережок	33rd Howitzer Artillery Regiment	Senior Lieutenant	20 May 1940	—
Andrey Berezin; Russian: Андрей Арсентьевич Березин	5th Heavy Motorized Pontoon-bridge Regiment	Red Army Man	29 June 1945	—
Ivan Berezin; Russian: Иван Николаевич Березин	975th Rifle Regiment	Red Army Man	24 March 1945 †	Killed in action on 26 June 1944
Semyon Berezin; Russian: Семён Петрович Березин	252nd Rifle Regiment	Senior Lieutenant	21 March 1940	—
Vadim Berezovsky; Ukrainian: Вадим Леонідович Березовський	31st Submarine Division	Captain 1st Class	30 March 1970	—
Efim Berezovsky; Hebrew: יפים ברזובסקי	692nd Artillery Regiment	Senior Lieutenant	10 January 1944	—
Ivan Berezutsky; Russian: Иван Михайлович Березуцкий	63rd Guards Fighter Aviation Regiment	Guard Major	23 February 1945	—
Nikolai Berendeev; Russian: Николай Михайлович Берендеев	160th Artillery Regiment	Red Army Man	11 April 1940	—
Grigory Beresnev; Russian: Григорий Ефимович Береснев	975th Rifle Regiment	Red Army Man	24 March 1945 †	Killed in action on 26 June 1944
Pavel Berestnev; Russian: Павел Максимович Берестнев	45th Fighter Aviation Regiment	Senior Lieutenant	24 May 1943	—
Pyotr Berestov; Russian: Пётр Филиппович Берестов	331st Rifle Division	Major-General	27 June 1945	—
Fyodor Berestov; Russian: Фёдор Сергеевич Берестов	201st Guards Rifle Regiment	Guard Sergeant	24 March 1945 †	Killed in action on 27 October 1944
Mihailo Berestovenko; Ukrainian: Михайло Порфирович Берестовенко	1063rd Rifle Regiment	Lieutenant	21 July 1944	—
Vasily Berestovoi; Russian: Василий Степанович Берестовой	823rd Artillery Regiment	Lieutenant	24 March 1945	—
Boris Berestovsky; Ukrainian: Борис Іванович Берестовський	332nd Tank Battalion	Senior Sergeant	10 January 1944	—
Mikhail Beryozkin; Russian: Михаил Яковлевич Берёзкин	435th Rifle Regiment	Senior Sergeant	29 June 1945	—
Sergei Beryozkin; Russian: Сергей Дмитриевич Берёзкин	242nd Separate Anti-tank Fighter Battalion	Senior Sergeant	24 March 1945	—
Nikolai Berzarin; Russian: Николай Эрастович Берзарин	5th Shock Army	Lieutenant-General	6 April 1945	—
Janis Berzins; Latvian: Jānis Bērziņš	6th Pontoon-bridge Brigade	Lieutenant Colonel	23 September 1944	—
Nikolai Beriya; Georgian: ნიკოლოზ ბერია	6th Guards Rifle Regiment	Red Army Guard	17 November 1943	—
Aleksandr Berkutov; Russian: Александр Максимович Беркутов	101st Guards Fighter Aviation Regiment	Guard Major	2 August 1944	—
Ibrahim Berkutov; Tatar: Ибраһим Билал улы Беркутов	616th Separate Sapper Battalion	Junior Lieutenant	13 November 1943	—
Dmitry Berlinsky; Russian: Дмитрий Михайлович Берлинский	288th Guards Rifle Regiment	Guard Lieutenant Colonel	27 February 1945	—
Dmitry Bernatsky; Russian: Дмитрий Васильевич Бернацкий	38th Guards Rifle Regiment	Guard Captain	27 June 1945 †	Killed in action on 23 January 1945
Mikhail Bernikov; Russian: Михаил Михайлович Берников	809th Assault Aviation Regiment	Major	15 May 1946	—
Vaclovas Bernotenas; Lithuanian: Vaclovas Bernotėnas	156th Rifle Regiment	Lieutenant	4 June 1944	—
Vladimir Beroshvili; Georgian: ვლადიმერ ბეროშვილი	205th Guards Rifle Regiment	Guard Junior Lieutenant	16 October 1943 †	Killed in action on 4 October 1943
Giorgi Beruashvili; Georgian: გიორგი ბერუაშვილი	132nd Separate Sapper Battalion	Red Army Man	10 January 1944	—
Aleksandr Besedin; Russian: Александр Васильевич Беседин	936th Rifle Regiment	Senior Lieutenant	22 February 1944	—
Nikolai Besedin; Russian: Николай Фёдорович Беседин	957th Rifle Regiment	Red Army Man	23 October 1943	—
Israel Beskin; Russian: Израиль Соломонович Бескин	70th Army	Lieutenant-General	31 May 1945	—
Aleksandr Bespalov; Russian: Александр Иванович Беспалов	578th Rifle Regiment	Junior Lieutenant	29 June 1945	—
Georgiy Bespalov; Russian: Георгий Иванович Беспалов	272nd Guards Mortar Regiment	Guard Captain	9 February 1944	—
Ivan Bespalov; Russian: Иван Антонович Беспалов	65th Guards Tank Brigade	Guard Captain	31 May 1945	—
Mikhail Bespalov; Russian: Михаил Гаврилович Беспалов	1st Brigade of the Pacific Fleet	Captain 3rd Class	14 September 1945	—
Aleksei Bespyatov; Russian: Алексей Иванович Беспятов	935th Rifle Regiment	Lieutenant Colonel	22 July 1944	—
Aleksandr Bessonov; Russian: Алексей Иванович Беспятов	18th Panzer Corps Reconnaissance Squad	Senior Sergeant	10 March 1944 †	18 October 1943
Vsevolod Bessonov; Russian: Всеволод Борисович Бессонов	Soviet submarine K-8	Captain 2nd Class	26 June 1970 †	Died in the sinking of K-8
Sergei Beschastny; Ukrainian: Сергій Арсентійович Бесчастний	235th Assault Aviation Regiment	Captain	15 May 1946	—
Georgi Beshnov; Russian: Георгий Степанович Бешнов	360th Rifle Regiment	Captain	24 March 1945	—
Kamchari Bzhigakov; Russian: Камчари Барокович Бжигаков	7th Guards Cavalry Regiment	Guard Senior Lieutenant	27 June 1945	—
Georgiy Bzarov; Russian: Георгий Николаевич Бзаров	32nd Guards Rifle Regiment	Guard Lieutenant Colonel	15 January 1944 †	Killed in action on 23 November 1943
Aleksandr Bibilashvili; Georgian: ალექსანდრე ბიბილაშვილი	80th Guards Rifle Regiment	Guard Captain	24 March 1945 †	Killed in action on 10 October 1944
Ivan Bibishev; Russian: Иван Фролович Бибишев	285th Assault Aviation Regiment	Lieutenant	24 August 1943 †	Killed in action on 18 January 1943
Nikifor Biganenko; Ukrainian: Никифор Ілліч Біганенко	124th Guards Artillery Regiment	Guard Lieutenant Colonel	31 May 1945	—
Oleksandr Bіdnenko; Ukrainian: Олександр Іванович Бідненко	961st Rifle Regiment	Major	27 February 1945	—
Volodymyr Bizhko; Ukrainian: Володимир Єгорович Біжко	92nd Guards Ground Attack Air Regiment	Guard Lieutenant	15 May 1946	—
Dmitry Bizyaev; Russian: Дмитрий Иванович Бизяев	173rd Guards Ground Attack Air Regiment	Guard Lieutenant	15 May 1946	—
Ivan Biema; Russian: Іван Спиридонович Бійма	66th Guards Tank Brigade	Guard Major	31 May 1945	—
Yevgeniy Bikbov; Tatar: Евгений Бикбов	25th Guards Tank Brigade	Guard Sergeant	24 March 1945	—
Soltan Bikaev; Bashkir: Солтан Хәмит улы Бикәев	586th Tank Battalion	Captain	20 December 1943	—
Ivan Biketov; Russian: Иван Владимирович Бикетов	48th Rifle Regiment	Major	23 October 1943	—
Salman Biktimerov; Bashkir: Сәлмән Ғәлиәхмәт улы Биктимеров	60th Guards Cavalry Regiment	Guard Senior Sergeant	15 January 1944	—
Giorgi Bilanishvili; Georgian: გიორგი ბილანიშვილი	343rd Rifle Regiment	Major	10 January 1944	—
Pavel Bilonov; Russian: Павел Семёнович Билаонов	681st Rifle Regiment	Major	13 September 1944	—
Kumza Bilibin; Russian: Кузьма Яковлевич Билибин	International Tank Brigade	Junior Commander	4 July 1937 †	Killed in action on 6 March 1937
Aleksandr Bilyukin; Russian: Александр Дмитриевич Билюкин	196th Fighter Aviation Regiment	Captain	2 November 1944	—
Kondraty Bilyutin; Russian: Кондратий Васильевич Билютин	78th Guards Rifle Regiment	Guard Colonel	19 June 1943	—
Yevgeniy Birbraer; Russian: Евгений Абрамович Бирбраер	225th Guards Rifle Regiment	Guard Senior Lieutenant	26 October 1943 †	Killed in action on 6 October 1943
Yakov Birenboim; Russian: Яков Абрамович Биренбойм	15th Guards Aviation Regiment	Guard Lieutenant Colonel	17 October 1943 †	Killed in action on 6 October 1943
Ivan Birtsev; Russian: Иван Фёдорович Бирцев	257th Rifle Regiment	Medic	11 April 1940 †	Killed in action on 22 February 1943
Ivan Birchenko; Ukrainian: Іван Кузьмич Бірченко	172nd Tank Brigade	Senior Lieutenant	8 September 1945	—
Sergey Biryuzov; Russian: Сергей Семёнович Бирюзов	Soviet Air Forces	Marshal of the Soviet Union	1 February 1958	—
Aleksandr Biryukov; Russian: Александр Иванович Бирюков	105th Guards Rifle Regiment	Guard Sergeant	13 September 1944	—
Boris Vasilevich Biryukov; Russian: Борис Васильевич Бирюков	92nd Fighter Aviation Regiment	Lieutenant	20 November 1941	—
Vasili Nikolaevich Biryukov; Russian: Василий Николаевич Бирюков	723rd Assault Aviation Regiment	Senior Lieutenant	23 February 1945	—
Vasili Yakovlevich Biryukov; Russian: Василий Яковлевич Бирюков	52nd Guards Cavalry Regiment	Guard Major	27 February 1945	—
Grigory Biryukov; Russian: Григорий Иванович Бирюков	1001st Rifle Regiment	Senior Lieutenant	24 March 1945	—
Ivan Biryukov; Russian: Иван Семёнович Бирюков	199th Guards Rifle Regiment	Guard Senior Lieutenant	22 July 1944 †	Killed in action on 25 June 1944
Konstantin Biryukov; Russian: Константин Михайлович Бирюков	71st Rifle Regiment	Junior Lieutenant	25 October 1943 †	Killed in action on 2 October 1943
Nikolai Biryukov; Russian: Николай Иванович Бирюков	20th Guards Rifle Corps	Guards Major-General	28 April 1945	—
Serafim Biryukov; Russian: Серафим Кириллович Бирюков	42nd Aviation Regiment	Captain	20 June 1942	—
Konstantin Biryulya; Russian: Константин Пименович Бирюля	355th Separate Marines Battalion of the Pacific Fleet	Sergeant	14 September 1945	—
Kumza Biserov; Russian: Кузьма Фёдорович Бисеров	207th Guards Rifle Regiment	Guard Corporal	8 September 1945	—
Prokopi Bityukov; Russian: Прокопий Семёнович Битюков	241st Guards Rifle Regiment	Guard Sergeant-Major	17 October 1943	—
Pyotr Bityutsky; Russian: Пётр Семёнович Битюцкий	66th Assault Aviation Regiment	Commissar	5 November 1942 †	Killed in action on 13 August 1941
Sergei Bitsaev; Russian: Сергей Владимирович Бицаев	845th Fighter Aviation Regiment	Lieutenant	18 August 1945	—
Vasily Blagov; Russian: Василий Иванович Благов	249th Separate Sapper Battalion	Sergeant	27 February 1945	—
Aleksei Blagoveshchensky; Belarusian: Аляксей Сяргеевіч Благавешчанскі	Soviet Volunteer Fighter Pilots in China	Captain	14 November 1938	—
Konstantin Blagodarov; Russian: Константин Владимирович Благодаров	8th Guards Ground Attack Aviation Regiment	Guard Senior Lieutenant	20 April 1945	—
Pavel Blagadeetev; Russian: Павел Сергеевич Благодетелев	467th Guards Mortar Regiment	Guard Senior Lieutenant	10 April 1945	—
Ivan Blazhevich; Lithuanian: Jonas Blaževičius	99th Guards Rifle Division	Guard Major-General	28 April 1945 †	Killed in action on 24 April 1945
Andri Blazhkun; Ukrainian: Андрій Федорович Блажкун	202nd Guards Rifle Regiment	Red Army Guard	24 March 1945	Killed in action on 27 November 1944
Aleksandrs Blaus; Latvian: Aleksandrs Blaus	572nd Rifle Regiment	Captain	24 March 1945	—
Sergei Blinnikov; Russian: Сергей Александрович Блинников	23rd Motorized Assault Aapper Brigade	Major	10 April 1945	—
Aleksei Blinov; Russian: Алексей Павлович Блинов	177th Guards Fighter Aviation Regiment	Guard Senior Lieutenant	23 February 1948	—
Vladimir Blinov; Russian: Владимир Карпович Блинов	170th Separate Engineer-Sapper Battalion	Sergeant	24 March 1945	—
Ivan Blinov; Russian: Иван Алексеевич Блинов	9th Guards Cavalry Regiment	Guard Senior Lieutenant	31 May 1945	—
Konstantin Blinov; Russian: Константин Минаевич Блинов	119th Tank Battalion	Junior Lieutenant	17 April 1943	—
Nikita Blinov; Russian: Никита Павлович Блинов	6th Guards Tank Brigade	Guard Senior Lieutenant	5 November 1942 †	Killed in action on 2 April 1942
Pavel Blinov; Russian: Павел Фёдорович Блинов	141st Guards Ground Attack Air Regiment	Guard Senior Lieutenant	10 April 1945	—
Viktor Blokhin; Russian: Виктор Алексеевич Блохин	173rd Rifle Regiment	Sergeant	21 July 1944 †	Killed in action on 14 June 1944
Ivan Blokhin; Russian: Иван Иванович Блохин	239th Fighter Aviation Regiment	Major	28 September 1943	—
Fyodor Blokhin; Russian: Фёдор Тимофеевич Блохин	875th Rifle Regiment	Staff Sergeant	24 March 1943	—
Aleksandr Bluvshtein; Russian: Александр Абрамович Блувштейн	5th Guards Airborne Brigade	Guard Major	24 April 1944	—
Nikolai Bobin; Russian: Николай Алексеевич Бобин	7th Aviation Regiment	Captain	31 December 1942	—
Valentin Bobkov; Russian: Валентин Васильевич Бобков	106th Guards Fighter Aviation Regiment	Guard Captain	27 June 1945	—
Viktor Bobkov; Russian: Виктор Николаевич Бобков	609th Rifle Regiment	Corporal	24 March 1945 †	Died of wounds on 17 October 1944
Grigory Bobkov; Russian: Григорий Евдокимович Бобков	43rd Rifle Regiment	Sergeant-Major	30 October 1943	—
Nikolai Bobkov; Russian: Николай Ефимович Бобков	1077th Rifle Regiment	Commissar and Senior Lieutenant	24 March 1945	—
Vitali Boborykin; Russian: Виталий Николаевич Боборыкин	126th Guards Rifle Regiment	Guard Lieutenant	24 March 1945	—
Ivan Boborykin; Russian: Иван Павлович Боборыкин	345th Tank Battalion	Sergeant	10 January 1944	—
Kostantin Boboshko; Russian: Костянтин Матвійович Бобошко	26th Guards Artillery Regiment	Guard Captain	4 June 1944	—
Tukhtasin Boboyev; Uzbek: Toʻxtasin Boboyev	154th Separate Reconnaissance Unit	Lance Sergeant	1 January 1944	—
Mikola Bobro; Ukrainian: Микола Макарович Бобро	95th Rifle Regiment	Staff Sergeant	24 March 1945	—
Vladimir Bobrov (pilot); Russian: Владимир Иванович Бобров	104th Guards Fighter Aviation Regiment	Guard Lieutenant Colonel	20 March 1991	—
Ivan Bobrov; Russian: Иван Яковлевич Бобров	409th Rifle Regiment	Senior Lieutenant	15 January 1944 †	Killed in action on 9 September 1943
Leonid Bobrov; Russian: Леонід Миколайович Бобров	134th Guards Bomber Aviation Regiment	Guard-Major	19 April 1945	—
Mikhail Bobrov; Russian: Михаил Иванович Бобров	609th Rifle Regiment	Lieutenant	24 April 1945	—
Nikolai Aleksandrovich Bobrov; Russian: Николай Александрович Бобров	44th Separate High-speed Bomber Aviation Regiment	Staff Sergeant	10 February 1943 †	Killed in action on 12 July 1942
Nikolai Galaktionovich Bobrov; Russian: Николай Галактионович Бобров	956th Rifle Regiment	Junior Lieutenant	22 February 1944 †	Killed in action on 4 October 1943
Fyodor Bobrov; Russian: Фёдор Александрович Бобров	42nd Guards Rifle Division	Guards Major-General	28 April 1945 †	Killed in action on 25 September 1944
Aleksandr Bobrovsky; Russian: Александр Андреевич Бобровский	880th Guards Bomber Aviation Regiment	Guard Captain	18 December 1956 †	Killed in action on 7 November 1956
Sergey Bobruk; Belarusian: Сяргей Антонавіч Бабрук	47th Guards Rifle Division	Guard Colonel	19 March 1944	—
Yefim Bova; Russian: Ефим Ермолаевич Бова	58th Separate Sapper Battalion	Corporal	4 June 1944 †	Killed in action on 20 July 1943
Vasiliy Bovt; Russian: Василий Афанасьевич Бовт	180th Guards Rifle Regiment	Guard Sergeant	15 May 1946	—
Stepan Bogaychuk; Russian: Степан Романович Богайчук	369th Artillery Regiment	Senior Lieutenant	16 November 1943	—
Vladimir Bogatkin; Russian: Владимир Владимирович Богаткин	1st Separate Anti-tank Artillery Battalion	Guard Captain	29 June 1945 †	Killed in action on 30 August 1944
Nikolai Bogatov; Russian: Николай Павлович Богатов	237th Tank Brigade	Sergeant-Major	23 September 1944	—
Pavel Bogatov; Russian: Павел Михайлович Богатов	210th Separate Communications Company	Lieutenant	10 January 1944	—
Pyotr Bogatov; Russian: Пётр Антонович Богатов	399th Howitzer Artillery Regiment	Lieutenant	23 September 1944	—
Vasily Bogatyrev; Russian: Василий Васильевич Богатырёв	364th Guards Artillery Regiment	Guard Lieutenant	15 May 1946 †	Killed in action on 3 April 1945
Kharun Bogatyrev; Russian: Харун Умарович Богатырёв	51st Guards Tank Brigade	Guard Major	17 November 1943	—
Ivan Bogatyr; Russian: Иван Иванович Богатырь	56th Rifle Regiment	Corporal	20 June 1942	—
Pyotr Bogatyr; Russian: Пётр Устинович Богатырь	136th Rifle Regiment	Junior Commissar	7 April 1940	—
Yegor Bogatsky; Russian: Егор Петрович Богацкий	48th Guards Tank Brigade	Guard Captain	31 May 1945	—
Aleksandr Bogachev; Russian: Александр Александрович Богачёв	51st Tallinn Mine-torpedo Aviation Regiment	Junior Lieutenant	6 March 1945	—
Vasiliy Bogachev; Russian: Василий Гаврилович Богачёв	10th Tank Regiment	Captain	27 December 1941 †	Killed in action on 29 September 1941
Aleksandr Bogashev; Russian: Александр Иннокентьевич Богашев	529th Rifle Regiment	Senior Lieutenant	13 September 1944	—
Dmitry Bogdan; Russian: Дмитрий Филиппович Богдан	565th Separate Sapper Battalion	Captain	24 March 1945 †	Killed in action on 20 March 1944
Viktor Bogdanenko; Russian: Виктор Александрович Богданенко	530th Anti-tank Artillery Regiment	Sergeant	27 June 1945	—
Grigory Bogdanenko; Russian: Григорий Иванович Богданенко	45th Guards Tank Brigade	Guard Sergeant-Major	26 April 1944	—
Aleksandr Bogdanov; Russian: Александр Петрович Богданов	Military advisor in the Democratic Republic of Afghanistan	Major	21 June 1984 †	Killed in action on 18 May 1984
Anatoli Bogdanov; Russian: Анатолий Сергеевич Богданов	58th Guards Ground Attack Aviation Regiment	Guard Senior Lieutenant	15 May 1946	—
Viktor Bogdanov; Russian: Виктор Иванович Богданов	828th Assault Aviation Regiment	Captain	18 August 1945	—
Grigory Bogdanov; Russian: Григорий Богданович Богданов	385th Rifle Regiment	Senior Lieutenant	17 October 1943 †	Killed in action on 1 October 1943
Ivan Bogdanov; Russian: Иван Васильевич Богданов	122nd Guards Separate Anti-tank Fighter Battalion	Guard Senior Sergeant	18 November 1944	—
Nikolai Vasilievich Bogdanov; Russian: Николай Васильевич Богданов	18th Guards Artillery Regiment	Guard Colonel	8 October 1942	—
Nikolai Dmitrievich Bogdanov; Russian: Николай Дмитриевич Богданов	34th Guards Artillery Regiment	Guard Major	16 October 1943	—
Pyotr Dmitrievich Bogdanov; Russian: Пётр Дмитриевич Богданов	1069th Rifle Regiment	Lieutenant	27 February 1945	—
Pyotr Moiseevich Bogdanov; Russian: Пётр Моисеевич Богданов	108th Separate Motorized Assault Sapper Battalion	Senior Lieutenant	10 April 1945 †	Killed in action on 1 February 1945
Pyotr Nikolaevich Bogdanov; Russian: Пётр Николаевич Богданов	66th Rifle Regiment	Staff Sergeant	27 June 1945	—
Semyon Bogdanov; Russian: Семён Ильич Богданов	2nd Tank Army; 2nd Guards Tank Army	Lieutenant-General; Guards Colonel-General	11 March 1944; 6 April 1945	Twice Hero of the Soviet Union
Khamzya Bogdanov; Tatar: Хәмзә Богданов	22nd Guards Motorized Rifle Brigade	Guards Colonel	31 May 1945	—
Pyotr Bogdanovich; Russian: Пётр Константинович Богданович	49th Rifle Division	Major-General	6 April 1945	—
Aleksandr Bogolyubov; Russian: Александр Николаевич Боголюбов	2nd Byelorussian Front	Colonel-General	29 May 1945	—
Aleksei Bogomaz; Russian: Алексей Лукич Богомаз	281st Guards Rifle Regiment	Guard Senior Lieutenant	24 March 1945	—
Grigory Bogomazov; Russian: Григорий Иванович Богомазов	158th Fighter Regiment	Senior Lieutenant	2 September 1945	—
Aleksandr Bogomolov; Russian: Александр Фёдорович Богомолов	1050th Rifle Regiment	Captain	27 February 1945	—
Aleksei Bogomolov; Russian: Алексей Максимович Богомолов	6th Guards Aviation Regiment	Guard Major	18 September 1943	—
Ivan Bogomolov; Russian: Иван Григорьевич Богомолов	931st Rifle Regiment	Staff Sergeant	13 November 1943	—
Konstantin Bogomolov; Russian: Константин Иванович Богомолов	69th Mechanized Brigade	Sergeant	17 November 1943	—
Nikolai Bogomolov; Russian: Николай Тимофеевич Богомолов	142nd Rifle Regiment	Staff Sergeant	24 March 1945	—
Semyon Bogomolov; Russian: Семён Иванович Богомолов	7th Separate Motorized Pontoon-and-Bridge Battalion	Sergeant	20 December 1943	—
Sergei Bogomolov; Russian: Сергей Александрович Богомолов	12th Mortar Regiment	Junior Lieutenant	3 June 1944	—
Samuil Bogorad; Russian: Самуил Нахманович Богорад	Submarine of the Baltic Fleet	Captain 3rd Class	8 July 1945	—
Vladimir Boguslavsky; Russian: Владимир Григорьевич Богуславский	67th Guards Rifle Division	Commissar and Guard Captain	22 July 1944	—
Viktor Bogutsky; Russian: Виктор Степанович Богуцкий	99th Independent Guards Intelligence Aviation Regiment	Guard Senior Lieutenant	18 August 1945 †	Killed in action on 23 February 1945
Ivan Bagushevich; Belarusian: Іван Міхайлавіч Багушэвіч	161st Separate Guards Cannon Artillery Regiment	Guard Lieutenant Colonel	26 October 1943	—
Afanasi Bodakov; Russian: ru:	224th Rifle Regiment	Lieutenant Colonel	29 June 1945	—
Vasiliy Bodnya; Russian: Василий Григорьевич Бодня	35th Guards Rifle Regiment	Guard Sergeant	27 June 1945	—
Aleksei Bodrov; Russian: Алексей Федотович Бодров	1st Guards Tank Brigade	Guards Junior Lieutenant	27 February 1945 †	Killed in action on 16 January 1945
Aleksandr Bodryashov; Russian: Александр Тимофеевич Бодряшов	145th Separate Anti-tank Fighter Battalion	Sergeant	3 June 1944	—
Ivan Boev; Russian: Иван Капитонович Боев	553rd Separate Sapper Battalion	Staff Sergeant	17 October 1943	—
Dmitry Boenko; Russian: Дмитрий Петрович Боенко	Intelligence Department of the 23rd Rifle Corps	Captain	3 June 1944 †	Killed in action on 20 October 1943
Aleksandr Bozhenko; Russian: Александр Гаврилович Боженко	344th tank battalion	Guard Sergeant-Major	10 January 1944	—
Vasiliy Boiko; Russian: Василий Романович Бойко	4th Rifle Division	Senior Political Instructor	7 April 1940	—
Grigory Boiko; Russian: Григорий Евдокимович Бойко	514th Separate Dive Bomber Aviation Regiment	Senior Lieutenant	21 July 1942 †	Killed in action on 7 June 1942
Dmitry Boiko; Russian: Дмитрий Дмитриевич Бойко	759th Rifle Regiment	Major	13 September 1944	—
Ivan Ivanovich Boiko; Russian: Иван Иванович Бойко	84th Guards Separate Sapper Battalion	Guard Senior Sergeant	26 October 1943	—
Ivan Nikiforovich Boiko; Russian: Иван Никифорович Бойко	69th Guards Tank Regiment; 64th Guards Tank Brigade	Guard Lieutenant Colonel	10 January 1944; 26 April 1944	Twice Hero of the Soviet Union
Nikolai Boiko; Russian: Николай Павлович Бойко	34th Guards Artillery Regiment	Guard Senior Lieutenant	16 October 1943	—
Saveli Boiko; Russian: Савелий Иванович Бойко	17th Guards Rifle Regiment	Guard Sergeant-Major	29 June 1945	—
Ivan Boikov; Russian: Иван Тимофеевич Бойков	155th Guards Ground Attack Aviation Regiment	Guard Senior Lieutenant	27 June 1945	—
Nikolai Boikov; Russian: Николай Сафронович Бойков	78th Rifle Regiment	Red Army Man	16 October 1943 †	Missing in action and presumed dead on 3 October 1943
Aleksandr Boitsov; Russian: Александр Герасимович Бойцов	218th Guards Rifle Regiment	Guard Lieutenant Colonel	15 January 1944	—
Arkadi Boitsov; Russian: Аркадий Сергеевич Бойцов	16th Fighter Aviation Regiment	Major and Commissar	14 July 1953	—
Yevgeni Boitsov; Russian: Евгений Васильевич Бойцов	289th Rifle Regiment	Senior Lieutenant	10 April 1945	—
Ivan Boitsov; Russian: Иван Никитович Бойцов	278th Motorized Rifle Regiment	Red Army Man	7 April 1940 †	Killed in action on 27 February 1940
Igor Boitsov; Russian: Игорь Михайлович Бойцов	96th Guards Artillery Regiment	Guard Senior Lieutenant	13 February 1944 †	Killed in action on 16 January 1944
Filipp Boitsov; Russian: Филипп Степанович Бойцов	74th Guards Ground Attack Aviation Regiment	Guards Senior Lieutenant	23 February 1945	—
Viktor Boichenko; Russian: Виктор Кузьмич Бойченко	496th Separate Reconnaissance Company	Corporal	1 November 1943	—
Aleksei Bokanev; Russian: Алексей Михайлович Боканев	498th Rifle Regiment	Red Army Man	24 March 1945	—
Nikolai Bokiy; Russian: Николай Андреевич Бокий	2nd Guards Fighter Aviation Regiment	Guards Junior Lieutenant	24 July 1943	—
Aleksandr Bolbas; Russian: Александр Карпович Болбас	11th Motorized Rifle Brigade	Captain	10 January 1944	—
Sergei Bolgarin; Russian: Сергей Иванович Болгарин	86th Cavalry Regiment	Corporal	24 March 1945	—
Ivan Boldun; Russian: Иван Корнеевич Болдун	1323rd Rifle Regiment	Sergeant-Major	15 January 1944	—
Aleksandr Boldrev; Russian: Александр Иванович Болдырев	347th Guards Self-propelled Artillery Regiment	Guards technician-lieutenant	31 May 1945	—
Ivan Bolesov; Russian: Иван Егорович Болесов	62nd Tank Regiment	Junior Platoon Commander	21 March 1940 †	Killed in action on 12 March 1940
Ivan Bolodurin; Russian: Иван Петрович Болодурин	234th Guards Rifle Regiment	Guards Sergeant	15 January 1944 †	Killed in action on 29 September 1943
Pyotr Boloto; Russian: Пётр Осипович Болото	84th Guards Rifle Regiment	Guards Junior Sergeant	5 November 1942	—
Andrey Bolotov; Russian: Андрей Иванович Болотов	467th Rifle Regiment	Senior Lieutenant	15 January 1944	—
Vasiliy Bolotov; Russian: Василий Гаврилович Болотов	61st Ground Attack Aviation Regiment	Senior Lieutenant	12 April 1942	—
Pavel Bolotov; Russian: Павел Васильевич Болотов	108th Tank Brigade	Captain	27 February 1945	—
Pavel Bolsunovsky; Russian: Павел Филиппович Болсуновский	791st Artillery Regiment	Lieutenant Colonel	27 June 1945 †	Killed in action on 26 April 1945
Georgy Boltaev; Russian: Георгий Семёнович Болтаев	172nd Guards Rifle Regiment	Guards Captain	31 May 1945	—
Pyotr Boltenkov; Russian: Пётр Михайлович Болтенков	270th Guards Rifle Regiment	Guards Senior Sergeant	22 February 1944	—
Aleksandr Boltushkin; Russian: Александр Павлович Болтушкин	78th Guards Rifle Regiment	Guards Senior Sergeant	18 May 1943 †	Killed in action on 2 March 1943
Ivan Bolkhovitin; Russian: Иван Григорьевич Болховитин	576th Artillery Regiment	Senior Sergeant	13 November 1943	—
Dmitry Bolshakov; Russian: Дмитрий Иванович Большаков	140th Guards Rifle Regiment	Guards Junior Sergeant	31 May 1945	—
Nikifor Bolshakov; Russian: Никифор Григорьевич Большаков	301st Howitzer Artillery Regiment	Senior Lieutenant	15 January 1940	—
Sergei Bolshakov; Russian: Сергей Петрович Большаков	426th Anti-tank Artillery Regiment	Senior Lieutenant	23 May 1945	—
Aleksandr Bondarev; Russian: Александр Митрофанович Бондарев	520th Rifle Regiment	Junior Lieutenant	10 January 1944	—
Andrey Bondarev; Russian: Андрей Леонтьевич Бондарев	17th Guards Rifle Corps	Guards Lieutenant-General	16 October 1943	—
Dmitry Bondarev; Russian: Дмитрий Иванович Бондарев	955th Rifle Regiment	Red Army Man	23 October 1943	—
Ivan Bondarev; Russian: Иван Иванович Бондарев	49th Guards Tank Brigade	Guards Senior Sergeant	27 February 1945	—
Matvei Bondarev; Russian: Матвей Арсентьевич Бондарев	32nd Guards Artillery Regiment	Guards Captain	10 April 1945 †	Killed in action on 24 January 1945
Vasili Yemelyanovich Bondarenko; Russian: Василий Емельянович Бондаренко	487th Rifle Regiment	Senior Lieutenant	27 February 1945	—
Vasili Yefimovich Bondarenko; Russian: Василий Ефимович Бондаренко	16th Guards Fighter Aviation Regiment	Guards Senior Lieutenant	27 June 1945	—
Vladimir Pavlovich Bondarenko; Russian: Владимир Павлович Бондаренко	694th Rifle Regiment	Lieutenant	16 May 1944	—
Ivan Antonovich Bondarenko; Russian: Иван Антонович Бондаренко	1041st Rifle Regiment	Major	3 June 1944 †	Killed in action on 26 March 1944
Ivan Maksimovich Bondarenko; Russian: Иван Максимович Бондаренко	459th Rifle Regiment	Captain	24 March 1945	—
Mikhail Grigorevich Bondarenko; Russian: Михаил Григорьевич Бондаренко	9th Minesweepder Division of the Baltic Fleet	Lieutenant Captain	22 January 1944 †	Killed in action on 8 November 1943
Mikhail Zakharovich Bondarenko; Russian: Михаил Захарович Бондаренко	198th Ground Attack Aviation Regiment	Lieutenant; Major	6 June 1942; 24 August 1943	Twice Hero of the Soviet Union
Mikhail Ivanovich Bondarenko; Russian: Михаил Иванович Бондаренко	981st Anti-aircraft Artillery Regiment	Red Army Man	24 December 1943 †	Killed in action on 22 October 1943
Pyotr Bondarenko; Russian: Пётр Николаевич Бондаренко	115th Guards Anti-tank Artillery Regiment	Guards Junior Sergeant	26 October 1943 †	Killed in action on 7 October 1943
Yakov Bondarenko; Russian: Яков Александрович Бондаренко	1075th Rifle Regiment	Red Army Man	21 July 1942 †	Killed in action on 16 November 1941
Filipp Bondarchuk; Russian: Филипп Яковлевич Бондарчук	132nd Guards Rifle Regiment	Guards Junior Sergeant	24 March 1945 †	Killed in action on 22 August 1944
Aleksandr Bondar; Russian: Александр Алексеевич Бондарь	866th Fighter Aviation Regiment	Senior Lieutenant	19 August 1944	—
Aleksandr Bondar; Russian: Александр Афанасьевич Бондарь	59th Guards Ground Attack Aviation Regiment	Guards Captain	13 April 1944 †	Killed in action on 28 October 1943
Anton Bondar; Russian: Антон Филиппович Бондарь	4th Guards Rifle Regiment	Guards Senior Sergeant	23 September 1944	—
Vladimir Bondar; Russian: Владимир Павлович Бондарь	1672nd Anti-tank Artillery Regiment	Senior Sergeant	23 May 1945	—
Georgiy Bondar; Russian: Георгий Герасимович Бондарь	957th Rifle Regiment	Junior Lieutenant	23 October 1943	—
Ivan Bondar; Russian: Иван Калистратович Бондарь	87th Rifle Division	Lieutenant Colonel	23 May 1945 †	Killed in action on 16 April 1944
Anatoli Bonin; Russian: Анатолий Петрович Бонин	358th Rifle Regiment	Lieutenant	10 January 1944	—
Viktor Bonin; Russian: Виктор Егорович Бонин	108th Tank Brigade	Junior Lieutenant	24 March 1945	—
Grigory Bordakov; Russian: Григорий Фокович Бордаков	904th Rifle Regiment	Sergeant	10 April 1945	—
Aleksey Bordunov; Russian: Алексей Николаевич Бордунов	1344th Rifle Regiment	Red Army Man	19 April 1945	—
Viktor Bordunov; Russian: Виктор Никитович Бордунов	664th Rifle Regiment	Sergeant	24 March 1945	—
Andrey Bordyugov; Russian: Андрей Алексеевич Бордюгов	955th Ground Attack Aviation Regiment	Senior Lieutenant	18 August 1945	—
Nikolai Boreev; Russian: Николай Ильич Бореев	1958th Anti-tank Fighter Artillery Regiment	Senior Lieutenant	9 February 1944	—
Arkadi Boreiko; Russian: Аркадий Александрович Борейко	9th Guards Rifle Corps	Guards Major-General	15 January 1944	—
Sergei Borzenko; Russian: Сергей Александрович Борзенко	18th Army Newspaper	Major	17 November 1943	—
Ivan Borzov; Russian: Иван Иванович Борзов	1st Guards Mine-torpedo Aviation Regiment	Guards Major	22 July 1944	—
Fyodor Boridyko; Russian: Фёдор Петрович Боридько	44th Guards Tank Brigade	Guards Major	27 February 1945	—
Ivan Borin; Russian: Иван Андрианович Борин	7th Guards Cavalry Regiment	Guards Senior Sergeant	27 June 1945	—
Ivan Borisevich; Russian: Иван Андреевич Борисевич	971st Artillery Regiment	Senior Sergeant	22 August 1944	—
Vasiliy Borisenko; Russian: Василий Павлович Борисенко	42nd Rifle Regiment	Lieutenant	10 January 1944	—
Vladimir Borisenko; Russian: Владимир Александрович Борисенко	1428th Light Artillery Regiment	Major	1 July 1944	—
Grigory Borisenko; Russian: Григорий Яковлевич Борисенко	207th Separate Reconnaissance Battalion	Captain	17 November 1939	—
Ivan Borisenko; Russian: Иван Иванович Борисенко	73rd Guards Fighter Aviation Regiment	Guard Captain	15 May 1946	—
Mikhail Borisenko; Russian: Михаил Петрович Борисенко	881st Self-propelled Artillery Regiment	Captain	13 September 1944	—
Stepan Borisenko; Russian: Степан Григорьевич Борисенко	655th Artillery Regiment	Sergeant	31 May 1945 †	Killed in action on 15 February 1945
Anatoly Borisky; Russian: Анатолий Васильевич Борискин	106th Guards Separate; Reconnaissance Company	Guards Senior Sergeant	22 February 1944	—
Pyotr Boriskin; Russian: Пётр Никитович Борискин	87th Separate Tank Regiment	Junior Lieutenant	27 June 1945	—
Fyodor Boriskin; Russian: Фёдор Иванович Борискин	1129th Rifle Regiment	Corporal	13 November 1943	—
Aleksandr Borisov; Russian: Александр Михайлович Борисов	1st Tank Regiment	Senior Sergeant	22 July 1941	—
Boris Borisov; Russian: Борис Степанович Борисов	184th Guards Rifle Regiment	Guards Captain	20 December 1943	—
Vasili Aleksandrovich Borisov; Russian: Василий Александрович Борисов	750th Aviation Regiment	Major	31 December 1942	—
Vasili Dmitrievich Borisov; Russian: Василий Дмитриевич Борисов	8th Separate Reconnaissance; Aviation Regiment	Captain	23 February 1945	—
Vladimir Aleksandrovich Borisov; Russian: Владимир Александрович Борисов	44th Guards Rifle Division	Guards Major-General	6 April 1945	—
Vladimir Ivanovich Borisov; Russian: Владимир Иванович Борисов	10th Guards Aviation Regiment	Guards Captain	19 August 1944	—
Georgiy Borisov; Russian: Георгий Алексеевич Борисов	130th Independent Reconnaissance Company	Senior Sergeant	27 June 1945	—
Ivan Grigorevich Borisov; Russian: Иван Григорьевич Борисов	9th Guards Fighter Aviation Regiment	Guards Senior Lieutenant	1 November 1943	—
Ivan Dmitrievich Borisov; Russian: Иван Дмитриевич Борисов	5th Fighter Aviation Regiment	Senior Lieutenant	7 February 1940 †	Killed in action on 25 December 1939
Ivan Fyodorovich Borisov; Russian: Иван Фёдорович Борисов	36th Guards Tank Brigade	Guards Junior Lieutenant	28 April 1945	—
Leonid Borisov; Russian: Леонид Николаевич Борисов	228th Guards Rifle Regiment	Guards Senior Lieutenant	27 June 1945 †	Killed in action on 1 February 1945
Mikhail Alekseevich Borisov; Russian: Михаил Алексеевич Борисов	62nd Fighter Aviation Regiment	Junior Lieutenant	6 May 1965 †	Killed in action on 10 August 1942
Mikhail Alekseevich Borisov; Russian: Михаил Алексеевич Борисов	42nd Rifle Regiment	Junior Lieutenant	10 January 1944 †	Killed in action on 13 October 1943
Mikhail Vladimirovich Borisov; Russian: Михаил Владимирович Борисов	51st Mine-torpedo Aviation Regiment	Lieutenant	6 March 1945	—
Mikhail Ivanovich Borisov; Russian: Михаил Иванович Борисов	957th Rifle Regiment	Captain	23 October 1943	—
Mikhail Pavlovich Borisov; Russian: Михаил Павлович Борисов	18th Separate Motorized; Pontoon-and-Bridge Battalion	Corporal	10 April 1945	—
Mikhail Semyonovich Borisov; Russian: Михаил Семёнович Борисов	212th Guards Rifle Regiment	Guards Colonel	17 October 1943	—
Mikhail Fyodorovich Borisov; Russian: Михаил Фёдорович Борисов	58th Motorized Rifle Brigade	Guards Senior Sergeant	10 January 1944	—
Nikolai Borisovich Borisov; Russian: Николай Борисович Борисов	215th Rifle Regiment	Major	22 July 1944	—
Nikolai Denisovich Borisov; Russian: Николай Денисович Борисов	2nd Guards Mechanized Brigade	Red Army Guard	29 June 1945	—
Nikolai Ivanovich Borisov; Russian: Николай Иванович Борисов	177th Guards Rifle Regiment	Guards Captain	15 May 1946	—
Pyotr Pavlovich Borisov; Russian: Пётр Павлович Борисов	11th Rifle Division	Brigade Commander	20 May 1940 †	Killed in action on 5 February 1940
Pyotr Sergeevich Borisov; Russian: Пётр Сергеевич Борисов	686th Ground Attack Aviation Regiment	Senior Lieutenant	15 May 1946	—
Aleksandr Borisyuk; Russian: Александр Евстафьевич Борисюк	588th Rifle Regiment	Senior Sergeant	24 March 1945	—
Ivan Borisyuk; Russian: Иван Иванович Борисюк	676th Rifle Regiment	Junior Lieutenant	7 August 1943	—
Sergey Borisyuk; Russian: Сергей Фёдорович Борисюк	797th Rifle Regiment	Red Army Man	13 September 1944	—
Artem Borichevsky; Russian: Артём Иванович Боричевский	190th Rifle Regiment	Captain	24 March 1945	—
Andrey Borovikov; Russian: Андрей Евстигнеевич Боровиков	59th Aviation Squadron	Senior Lieutenant	25 October 1938 †	Killed in action on 6 August 1938
Mariya Borovichenko; Russian: Мария Сергеевна Боровиченко	32nd Guards Artillery Regiment	Guards Sergeant	6 May 1965 †	Killed in action on 14 July 1943
Orest Borovkov; Russian: Орест Николаевич Боровков	3rd Long-Range Bomber Aviation Corps	Major	22 February 1939	—
Pavel Borovkov; Russian: Павел Игнатьевич Боровков	76th Separate Assault Sapper Battalion	Junior Sergeant	10 April 1945	—
Andrey Borovykh; Russian: Андрей Егорович Боровых	157th Fighter Aviation Regiment	Junior Lieutenant; Captain	24 August 1943; 23 February 1945 †	—
Ilya Borodavkin; Russian: Илья Сергеевич Бородавкин	330th Guards Anti-tank Artillery Regiment	Guards Senior Sergeant	24 December 1943	—
Viktor Borodatchev; Russian: Виктор Иванович Бородачёв	40th Guards Fighter Aviation Regiment	Guards Captain	1 July 1944	—
Aleksei Borodin; Russian: Алексей Иванович Бородин	504th Ground Attack Aviation Regiment	Senior Lieutenant	1 May 1943	—
Viktor Borodin; Russian: Виктор Петрович Бородин	565th Ground Attack Aviation Regiment	Senior Lieutenant	18 August 1945	—
Georgiy Borodin; Russian: Георгий Демьянович Бородин	12th Anti-tank Artillery Regiment	Senior Sergeant	16 May 1944	—
Ivan Borodin; Russian: Иван Фёдорович Бородин	7th Guards Cavalry Regiment	Red Army Guard	27 June 1945	—
Leonid Borodin; Russian: Леонид Григорьевич Бородин	1137th Light Artillery Regiment	Junior Sergeant	31 May 1945	—
Nikolai Vasilievich Borodin; Russian: Николай Васильевич Бородин	43rd Fighter Aviation Regiment	Senior Lieutenant	23 February 1945	—
Nikolai Ivanovich Borodin; Russian: Николай Иванович Бородин	171st Guards Rifle Regiment	Guards Senior Sergeant	24 March 1945	—
Sergei Borodulin; Russian: Сергей Дмитриевич Бородулин	3rd Guards Mortar Regiment	Red Army Guard	24 March 1945 †	Killed in action on 26 June 1944
Stepan Borozenets; Russian: Степан Николаевич Борозенец	569th Ground Attack Aviation Regiment	Lieutenant	18 August 1945	—
Ivan Boronin; Russian: Иван Константинович Боронин	366th Bomber Aviation Regiment	Major	13 December 1942	—
Mikhail Boronin; Russian: Михаил Петрович Боронин	9th Guards Mine-torpedo Aviation Regiment	Guards Lieutenant	22 February 1944	—
Nikifor Boronin; Russian: Никифор Данилович Боронин	215th Rifle Regiment	Sergeant	22 July 1944	—
Vladimir Borsoev; Russian: Владимир Бузинаевич Борсоев	7th Guards Anti-tank Artillery Brigade	Guards Colonel	6 May 1965 †	Killed in action on 8 March 1945
Roman Bortnik; Russian: Роман Иосифович Бортник	965th Rifle Regiment	Colonel	24 March 1945	—
Matvey Bortovsky; Russian: Матвей Нестерович Бортовский	9th Tank Regiment	Major	31 May 1945	—
Sergey Borshchev; Russian: Сергей Тимофеевич Борщёв	79th Guards Ground Attack Aviation Regiment	Guard Lieutenant Colonel	15 May 1946	—
Ivan Borshchik; Russian: Иван Владимирович Борщик	239th Artillery Regiment	Senior Lieutenant	24 March 1945 †	Killed in action on 21 August 1944
Aleksei Bosov; Russian: Алексей Петрович Босов	8th Motorized Brigade	Senior Lieutenant	17 November 1939	—
Vasiliy Botylev; Russian: Василий Андреевич Ботылёв	393rd Independent Marines Battalion	Lieutenant Captain	18 September 1943	—
Maksim Bocharikov; Russian: Максим Петрович Бочариков	132nd Guards Rifle Regiment	Guards Sergeant	24 March 1945	—
Arkadi Bocharnikov; Russian: Аркадий Николаевич Бочарников	533rd Anti-tank Artillery Regiment	Corporal	24 March 1945 †	Killed in action on 25 October 1944
Georgiy Bocharnikov; Russian: Георгий Алексеевич Бочарников	823rd Artillery Regiment	Sergeant-Major	15 May 1946	—
Ivan Bocharnikov; Russian: Иван Петрович Бочарников	21st Guards Tank Brigade	Guards Senior Lieutenant	25 August 1944 †	Killed in action on 11 November 1943
Pyotr Bocharnikov; Russian: Пётр Степанович Бочарников	429th Rifle Regiment	Junior Lieutenant	13 September 1944	—
Vladimir Bocharov; Russian: Владимир Михайлович Бочаров	Spanish Civil War Aviation Detachment	Captain	31 December 1936 †	Captured, tortured, and executed on 13 November 1936
Ivan Ivanovich Bocharov; Russian: Иван Иванович Бочаров	481st Rifle Regiment	Senior Sergeant	3 June 1944	—
Ivan Kirillovich Bocharov; Russian: Иван Кириллович Бочаров	222nd Separate Sapper Battalion	Junior Sergeant	31 May 1945	—
Maksim Bocharov; Russian: Максим Георгиевич Бочаров	705th Rifle Regiment	Junior Sergeant	17 October 1943	—
Nikolai Bocharov; Russian: Николай Павлович Бочаров	280th Rifle Regiment	Commissar	12 January 1942	—
Sergei Bocharov; Russian: Сергей Иванович Бочаров	538th Rifle Regiment	Senior Sergeant	10 April 1945	—
Yakov Bocharov; Russian: Яков Васильевич Бочаров	76th Guards Rifle Regiment	Guards Senior Sergeant	22 February 1944 †	Killed in action on 2 October 1943
Pyotr Bochek; Russian: Пётр Семёнович Бочек	76th Guards Rifle Regiment	Guards Sergeant	24 March 1945	—
Vasiliy Bochenkov; Russian: Василий Тимофеевич Боченков	172nd Guards Rifle Regiment	Guards Captain	31 May 1945	—
Ivan Bochenkov; Russian: Иван Андреевич Боченков	61st Separate Motorized Pontoon-Bridge Battalion	Senior Sergeant	30 October 1943	—
Pyotr Bochin; Russian: Пётр Антонович Бочин	10th Guards Bomber Aviation Regiment	Guards Lieutenant	1 November 1943	—
Aleksandr Bochkarev; Russian: Александр Григорьевич Бочкарёв	47th Guards Tank Brigade	Guards Sergeant-Major	27 February 1945 †	Killed self with grenade to avoid capture on 17 January 1945
Vasiliy Bochkarev; Russian: Василий Никифорович Бочкарёв	1140th Rifle Regiment	Sergeant	10 January 1944	—
Mikhail Bochkarev; Russian: Михаил Степанович Бочкарёв	95th Rifle Regiment	Captain	25 October 1938	—
Pyotr Bochkarev; Russian: Пётр Васильевич Бочкарёв	1959th Anti-tank Artillery Regiment	Captain	26 October 1944	—
Ivan Bochkov; Russian: Иван Васильевич Бочков	19th Guards Fighter Aviation Regiment	Guards Captain	1 May 1943	—
Kirill Bochkovich; Russian: Кирилл Васильевич Бочкович	384th Independent Marines Battalion	Starshina 2nd Class	20 April 1945 †	Killed in action on 24 August 1944
Vladimir Bochkovsky; Russian: Владимир Александрович Бочковский	1st Guards Tank Brigade	Guards Captain	26 April 1944	—
Grigory Boyarinov; Russian: Григорий Иванович Бояринов	Spetsnaz	Colonel	28 April 1980 †	Killed in action in Afghanistan on 27 December 1979
Vladimir Boyarintsev; Russian: Владимир Сергеевич Бояринцев	359th Separate Communications Battalion	Senior Sergeant	24 March 1945	—
Timofei Boyarintsev; Russian: Тимофей Алексеевич Бояринцев	109th Rifle Regiment	Senior Sergeant	16 October 1943	—
Boyarkin Vasili; Russian: Василий Илларионович Бояркин	60th Guards Cavalry Regiment	Guards Senior Sergeant	15 January 1944	—
Vasiliy Boyarshinov; Russian: Иванович Бояршинов Василий	627th Artillery Regiment	Junior Sergeant	10 January 1944	—
Aleksei Bragin; Russian: Алексей Васильевич Брагин	825th Ground Attack Aviation Regiment	Lieutenant	15 May 1946	—
Vasili Yefimovich Bragin; Russian: Василий Ефимович Брагин	854th Rifle Regiment	Lieutenant	24 March 1945	—
Vasili Petrovich Bragin; Russian: Василий Петрович Брагин	491st Rifle Regiment	Junior Sergeant	24 March 1945	—
Nikolai Bragin; Russian: Николай Михайлович Брагин	90th Tank Battalion	Commissar	21 March 1940 †	Killed in action on 7 March 1940
Nikolai Braginets; Russian: Николай Григорьевич Брагинец	63rd High-Speed Bomber Aviation Regiment	Senior Lieutenant	19 May 1940	—
Terentiy Bragonin; Russian: Терентий Иванович Брагонин	156th Guards Artillery Regiment	Guards Senior Sergeant	16 November 1943	—
Aleksandr Brazhnikov; Russian: Александр Николаевич Бражников	237th Ground Attack Aviation Regiment	Senior Lieutenant	23 February 1945	—
Ivan Brazhnikov; Russian: Иван Моисеевич Бражников	132nd High-Speed Bomber Aviation Regiment	Sergeant	27 March 1942	—
Anatoli Brandis; Ukrainian: Анатолій Якович Брандис	75th Guards Ground Attack Aviation Regiment	Guard Senior Lieutenant; Guard Captain	23 February 1945; 29 June 1945	Twice Hero of the Soviet Union
Ivan Bratus; Ukrainian: Іван Іванович Братусь	297th Separate Anti-tank Division	Senior Sergeant	16 October 1943	—
Gennadiy Bratchikov; Russian: Геннадий Иванович Братчиков	"Ovin" Intelligence Department	Major	24 March 1945	—
Nikolai Bratsyuk; Russian: Николай Захарович Брацюк; Ukrainian: Брацюк Микола Захарович	305th Tank Battalion	Major	15 January 1944 †	Killed in action on 23 July 1943
Nikolai Alekseevich Bredikhin; Russian: Николай Алексеевич Бредихин	62nd Guards Tank Brigade	Guards Sergeant-Major	10 April 1945	—
Nikolai Fyodorovich Bredikhin; Russian: Николай Фёдорович Бредихин	60th Tank Regiment	Major	15 January 1944	—
Anatoliy Bredov; Russian: Анатолий Фёдорович Бредов	155th Rifle Regiment	Sergeant	24 March 1945 †	Killed self with grenade to avoid capture on 11 October 1944
Stepan Breus; Russian: Степан Лаврентьевич Бреус	32nd Artillery Regiment	Corporal	13 September 1944	—
Yakov Breus; Russian: Яков Георгиевич Бреус; Ukrainian: Бреус Яків Георгійович	161st Rifle Regiment	Lieutenant	10 February 1942	—
Vladimir Breusoc; Russian: Владимир Ефимович Бреусов	960th Rifle Regiment	Red Army Man	1 November 1943	—
Stepan Breusov; Russian: Степан Тихонович Бреусов	1126th Rifle Regiment	Junior Lieutenant	22 July 1944	—
Konstantin Brekhov; Russian: Константин Владимирович Брехов	62nd Ground Attack Aviation Regiment	Captain	1 May 1943	—
Georgiy Brik; Russian: Григорий Евдокимович Брик	42nd Guards Rifle Regiment	Guards Captain	10 April 1945	—
Pavel Brikel; Russian: Павел Порфирьевич Брикель	6th Guards Cavalry Division	Guards General-Major	29 May 1945	—
Timofei Brilev; Russian: Тимофей Ефимович Брилёв	276th Guards Light Artillery Regiment	Guards Sergeant-Major	16 November 1943	—
Pavel Brilin; Russian: Павел Тимофеевич Брилин	71st Guards Rifle Regiment	Guards Red Army Man	19 April 1945	—
Pyotr Brinko; Russian: Пётр Антонович Бринько	13th Fighter Aviation Regiment	Lieutenant	17 July 1941	—
Aleksei Brintkov; Russian: Алексей Петрович Бритиков	85th Guards Fighter Aviation Regiment	Guard Captain	15 May 1946	—
Vladimir Brovarets; Russian: Владимир Тимофеевич Броварец	248th Cadet Brigade	Lieutenant	17 October 1943	—
Nikolai Brovtsev; Russian: Николай Михайлович Бровцев	923rd Rifle Regiment	Captain	29 June 1945 †	Killed in action on 15 April 1945
Ivan Brovchenko; Russian: Иван Никонович Бровченко; Ukrainian: Бровченко Іван Никонович	936th Rifle Regiment	Red Army Man	13 September 1944	—
Vladimir Brodyuk; Russian: Владимир Владимирович Бродюк	12th Independent Marine Corps Brigade	Junior Lieutenant	5 November 1944	—
Nikolai Brozgol; Russian: Николай Израилевич Брозголь	24th Separate Guards Heavy Cannon Artillery Brigade	Guards Colonel	16 May 1944	—
Ivan Bronets; Russian: Иван Иванович Бронец; Ukrainian: Бронець Іван Іванович	6th Light Tank Brigade	Junior Commander	17 November 1939 †	Killed in action on 24 August 1939
Yulian Bronitsky; Russian: Юлиан Марьянович Броницкий	899th Artillery Regiment	Lieutenant Colonel	29 October 1943	—
Mikhail Bronnikov; Russian: Михаил Максимович Бронников	67th Guards Rifle Division	Guard Colonel	22 July 1944	—
Aleksandr Brosalov; Russian: Александр Никанорович Бросалов	436th Artillery Regiment	Senior Sergeant	27 June 1945	—
Fyodor Brui; Russian: Фёдор Филиппович Бруй; Belarusian: Бруй Фёдар Піліпавіч	520th Rifle Regiment	Major	29 October 1943	—
Ivan Brusov; Russian: Иван Никифорович Брусов	1995th Anti-aircraft Artillery Regiment	Junior Sergeant	10 April 1945 †	Killed in action on 25 January 1945
Ivan Bryzgalov; Russian: Иван Иванович Брызгалов	1452nd Self-propelled Artillery Regiment	Junior Sergeant	24 March 1945 †	Killed in action on 7 August 1944
Pavel Bryzgalov; Russian: Павел Александрович Брызгалов	178th Guards Fighter Aviation Regiment	Guards Senior Lieutenant	15 May 1946	—
Aleksei Brykin; Russian: Алексей Александрович Брыкин	1360th Anti-aircraft Artillery Regiment	Major	10 April 1945	—
Nikolai Bryl; Russian: Николай Харлампиевич Брыль	89th Guards Separate Communications Company	Guards Sergeant	24 March 1945	—
Vasiliy Bryn; Russian: Василий Мартынович Брынь	89th Guards Separate Sapper Battalion	Guards Corporal	26 October 1943	—
Fyodor Brysev; Russian: Фёдор Яковлевич Брысев; Ukrainian: Брысев Федір Якович	109th Aviation Regiment	Captain	19 August 1944	—
Aleksei Bryukhanov; Russian: Алексей Иванович Брюханов	320th Separate Reconnaissance Company	Sergeant	30 October 1943 †	Killed in action on 17 October 1943
Stepan Bryukhanov; Russian: Степан Степанович Брюханов	996th Ground Attack Aviation Regiment	Senior Lieutenant	29 June 1945	—
Pavel Bryakin; Russian: Павел Константинович Брякин	202nd Guards Rifle Regiment	Guards Corporal	10 January 1944	—
Grigory Buachidze; Georgian: ბუაჩიძე გრიგოლ	115th Guards Anti-tank Artillery Regiment	Guards Senior Sergeant	26 October 1943	—
Vitaly Bubenin; Russian: Виталий Дмитриевич Бубенин	Border Guard Service	Senior Lieutenant	21 March 1969	—
Leonid Buber; Russian: Леонид Ильич Бубер	212th Rifle Regiment	Lieutenant	7 April 1940	—
Pavel Bubliy; Russian: Павел Семёнович Бублий	1164th Rifle Regiment	Major	24 March 1945	—
Fyodor Bublikov; Russian: Фёдор Борисович Бубликов	70th Guards Ground Attack Aviation Regiment	Guards Senior Lieutenant	2 August 1944	—
Nikolai Bubnov; Russian: Николай Матвеевич Бубнов	11th Separate Guards Tank Brigade	Guards Colonel	4 November 1943 †	Killed in action on 2 August 1943
Boris Buvin; Russian: Борис Петрович Бувин	Detachment of the Azov Flotilla	Lieutenant	16 May 1944	—
Ivan Buvin; Russian: Иван Иванович Бувин	339th Separate Anti-Tank Fighter Battalion	Senior Lieutenant	26 October 1944	—
Aleksandr Bugaev; Russian: Александр Лаврентьевич Бугаев	345th Separate Sapper Battalion	Senior Lieutenant	24 March 1945	—
Viktor Bugaev; Russian: Виктор Елисеевич Бугаев	332nd Tank Battalion	Guards Sergeant	10 January 1944	—
Gadzhi Buganov; Russian: Гаджи Османович Буганов	23rd Shock Assault Rifle Battalion	Captain	24 March 1945	—
Feoktist Budanov; Russian: Феоктист Андреевич Буданов	63rd Guards Rifle Division	Guard Colonel	13 February 1944	—
Viktor Budaragin; Russian: Виктор Александрович Бударагин	1st Guards Mine-Torpedo Aviation Regiment	Guards Lieutenant	19 August 1944	—
Nikolai Budarin; Russian: Николай Петрович Бударин	241st Guards Rifle Regiment	Guards Lieutenant Colonel	17 October 1943	—
Mikhail Budenkov; Russian: Михаил Иванович Буденков	59th Guards Rifle Regiment	Guards Senior Sergeant	24 March 1945	—
Semyon Budyonny; Russian: Семён Михайлович Будённый	1st Cavalry Army	Marshall of the Soviet Union	1 February 1958; 24 April 1963; 22 February 1968	—
Ivan Budilin; Russian: Иван Михайлович Будилин	685th Rifle Regiment	Junior Sergeant	30 October 1943	—
Gavril Budnik; Russian: Гавриил Дмитриевич Будник	151st Rifle Regiment	Red Army Man	16 October 1943	—
Nikolai Budylin; Russian: Николай Васильевич Будылин	10th Guards Rifle Regiment	Guards Lieutenant Colonel	16 October 1943	—
Konstantin Budykov; Russian: Константин Александрович Будьков	1071st Rifle Regiment	Major	27 February 1945	—
Mikola Budyuk; Ukrainian: Микола Васильович Будюк	953rd Light Self-propelled Artillery Regiment	Captain	24 March 1945	—
Semyon Buzdalin; Russian: Семён Григорьевич Буздалин	132nd Guards Rifle Regiment	Guards Junior Lieutenant	29 October 1943	—
Fyodor Buzikov; Russian: Фёдор Петрович Бузиков	74th Guards Ground Attack Aviation Regiment	Guards Senior Lieutenant	13 April 1944 †	Killed in action on 14 January 1944
Vadim Buzinov; Russian: Вадим Николаевич Бузинов	148th Fighter Aviation Regiment	Captain	18 August 1945	—
Mikhail Buzinov; Russian: Михаил Васильевич Бузинов	274th Guards Light Artillery Regiment	Guards Lieutenant Colonel	24 December 1943	—
Ivan Buzytskov; Russian: Иван Дмитриевич Бузыцков	Border Guard Service	Junior Sergeant	26 August 1941	—
Pyotr Buiko; Russian: Пётр Михайлович Буйко	4th Medical Battalion	Military Physician 2nd Class	7 August 1944 †	Burned alive by the Gestapo on 15 October 1943
Pavel Buinevich; Belarusian: Павел Мікалаевіч Буйневіч	447th Rifle Regiment	Sergeant	27 February 1945	—
Nikolai Buinov; Russian: Николай Васильевич Буйнов	7th Guards Mechanized Brigade	Guards Junior Lieutenant	24 March 1945	—
Ivan Bukaev; Russian: Иван Прокофьевич Букаев	78th Guards Rifle Regiment	Red Army Guard	18 May 1943	—
Ivan Bukanov; Russian: Иван Александрович Буканов	308th Artillery Regiment	Lieutenant	3 June 1944	—
Malgajdar Bokenbayev; Kazakh: Малғаждар Бөкенбаев	1081st Rifle Regiment	Lieutenant	27 February 1945	—
Akakiy Bukiya; Georgian: აკაკი ბუკია	745th Self-propelled Artillery Regiment	Major	24 March 1945	—
Fyodor Buklov; Russian: Фёдор Григорьевич Буклов	139th Guards Artillery Regiment	Guards Lieutenant	15 May 1946	—
Yefim Bukotkin; Russian: Ефим Егорович Букоткин	931st Rifle Regiment	Sergeant-Major	15 May 1946 †	Killed in action on 26 April 1945
Viktor Bulavsky; Russian: Виктор Константинович Булавский	402nd Artillery Regiment	Lieutenant	15 January 1940 †	Killed in action on 26 December 1939
Aleksandr Bulaev; Russian: Александр Дмитриевич Булаев	159th Fighter Aviation Regiment	Major	2 September 1943 †	Killed in plane crash on 17 May 1943
Ivan Bulaenko; Russian: Иван Савельевич Булаенко	11th Guards Airborne Regiment	Guards Lieutenant Colonel	28 April 1945	—
Aleksei Bulanov; Russian: Алексей Парфёнович Буланов	334th Bomber Aviation Regiment	Captain	15 May 1946	—
Vladimir Bulat; Russian: Владимир Андреевич Булат	175th Guards Artillery-Mortar Regiment	Guard Sergeant	31 May 1945	—
Vasil Bulatov; Tatar: Васил Булатов	40th Rifle Regiment	Junior Lieutenant	23 August 1944	—
Mikhail Bulatov; Russian: Михаил Алексеевич Булатов	369th Separate Sapper Battalion	Senior Sergeant	19 April 1945	—
Khozat Bulatov; Bashkir: Хоҙат Сәлимйән улы Булатов	58th Guards Cavalry Regiment	Guards Sergeant	9 February 1944	—
Aleksei Bulakhov; Russian: Алексей Анисимович Булахов	97th Guards Rifle Regiment	Guards Lieutenant Colonel	24 March 1945	—
Aleksandr Bulgakov; Russian: Александр Герасимович Булгаков	20th Tank Brigade	Captain	26 September 1944	—
Andrei Alekseevich Bulgakov; Russian: Андрей Алексеевич Булгаков	106th Guards Separate Reconnaissance Company	Red Army Guard	22 February 1944	—
Andrei Panteleevich Bulgakov; Russian: Андрей Пантелеевич Булгаков	265th Fighter Aviation Regiment	Senior Lieutenant	18 August 1945	—
Pyotr Bulgakov; Russian: Пётр Семёнович Булгаков	1035th Rifle Regiment	Red Army Man	17 October 1943 †	Killed in action on 29 September 1943
Stepan Bulda; Russian: Степан Константинович Булда	129th Rifle Regiment	Red Army Man	13 September 1944	—
Mikhail Buldakov; Russian: Михаил Григорьевич Булдаков	146th Guards Rifle Regiment	Guards Captain	27 June 1945	—
Vladimir Bulychev; Russian: Владимир Константинович Булыгин	Soviet Navy Radiation Safety Training Center	Captain 1st Class	27 July 1990	—
Viktor Bulychev; Russian: Виктор Алексеевич Булычев	393rd Guards Self-Propelled Artillery Regiment	Guard Lieutenant	27 February 1945	—
Sergei Bulychev; Russian: Сергей Сергеевич Булычев	6th Army Komsomol Department	Captain	22 February 1944	—
Iosif Bumagin; Russian: Иосиф Романович Бумагин	396th Rifle Regiment	Lieutenant	27 June 1945 †	Killed in action on 24 April 1945
Yuri Bunimovich; Russian: Юрий Эммануилович Бунимович	1st Guards Mine-Torpedo Aviation Regiment	Guards Senior Lieutenant	22 January 1944	—
Ziya Bunyadov; Azerbaijani: Ziya Bünyadov	123rd Separate Rifle Company	Captain	27 February 1945	—
Vasiliy Buntovskikh; Russian: Василий Васильевич Бунтовских	33rd Separate Sapper Battalion	Lieutenant	10 January 1944	—
Aleksandr Burak; Russian: Александр Кондратьевич Бурак	208th Ground Attack Aviation Regiment	Senior Lieutenant	29 June 1945	—
Andrey Burak; Russian: Андрей Матвеевич Бурак	198th Guards Rifle Regiment	Red Army Guard	13 November 1943	—
Vasiliy Burakov; Russian: Василий Николаевич Бураков	712th Rifle Regiment	Lieutenant	17 October 1943	—
Vladimir Burba; Russian: Владимир Трофимович Бурба	220th Guards Rifle Regiment	Guards Lieutenant	24 March 1945 †	Killed in action on 7 August 1944 after throwing self under enemy tank with bag of grenades and detonating them
Aleksandr Burda; Russian: Александр Фёдорович Бурда	64th Guards Tank Brigade	Guards Lieutenant Colonel	24 April 1944 †	Killed in action on 25 January 1944
Vladimir Burdasov; Russian: Владимир Леонтьевич Бурдасов	102nd Guards Anti-tank Artillery Regiment	Guards Lieutenant	24 March 1945 †	Killed in action on 23 August 1944
Aleksei Burdeinei; Russian: Алексей Семёнович Бурдейный	2nd Guards Tank Corps	Guards Lieutenant-General	19 April 1945	—
Vasiliy Burenko; Russian: Василий Иванович Буренко	128th Guards Artillery Regiment	Guards Junior Lieutenant	26 October 1944	—
Nikolai Burka; Russian: Николай Лукьянович Бурка	836th Rifle Regiment	Senior Lieutenant	29 October 1943	—
Mikhail Burkin; Russian: Михаил Иванович Буркин	52nd Mine-Torpedo Aviation Regiment	Lieutenant Colonel	14 September 1945	—
Valery Burkov; Russian: Валерий Анатольевич Бурков	50th Mixed Aviation Regiment	Colonel	17 October 1991	—
Anatoly Burkovsky; Russian: Анатолий Трофимович Бурковский	935th Rifle Regiment	Major	24 March 1945	—
Ivan Burkut; Russian: Иван Сидорович Буркут	42nd Separate Sapper Battalion	Sergeant	13 November 1943 †	Killed in action on 2 October 1943
Ivan Burlak; Russian: Иван Емельянович Бурлак	897th Rifle Regiment	Senior Sergeant	24 March 1945	—
Isak Burlaka; Russian: Исак Ефимович Бурлака	1176th Rifle Regiment	Red Army Man	23 September 1944	—
Ivan Burlakov; Russian: Иван Семёнович Бурлаков	66th Guards Rifle Regiment	Guards Lieutenant	31 May 1945	—
Stepan Burlachenko; Russian: Степан Филиппович Бурлаченко	47th Guards Tank Brigade	Guards Junior Sergeant	27 February 1945	—
Anton Burlachuk; Russian: Антон Игнатьевич Бурлачук	601st Rifle Regiment	Red Army Man	31 May 1945 †	Killed after detonating grenades on self when fully surrounded by German troops on 17 February 1945
Pavel Burlutsky; Russian: Павел Иванович Бурлуцкий	26th Guards Aviation Regiment	Guards Lieutenant Colonel	19 August 1944	—
Grigory Burmak; Russian: Григорий Васильевич Бурмак	21st Guards Tank Brigade	Guards Lieutenant	24 March 1945	—
Vasily Burmaka; Russian: Василий Антонович Бурмака	809th Ground Attack Aviation Regiment	Lieutenant	15 May 1946	—
Ivan Burmakov; Russian: Иван Дмитриевич Бурмаков	31st Guards Rifle Division	Guards Major-General	19 April 1945	—
Vladimir Burmatov; Russian: Владимир Александрович Бурматов	255th Fighter Aviation Regiment	Senior Lieutenant	31 May 1944	—
Vilen Burmistrov; Russian: Вилен Иванович Бурмистров	22nd Guards Motorized Rifle Brigade	Guards Sergeant-Major	10 January 1944 †	Killed in action on 24 September 1943
Ivan Alekseevich Burmistrov; Russian: Иван Алексеевич Бурмистров	S-1 Submarine of the Spanish Navy	Captain 3rd Class	14 November 1938	—
Ivan Nikolaevich Burmistrov; Russian: Иван Николаевич Бурмистров	225th Guards Rifle Regiment	Red Army Guard	26 October 1943	—
Mikhail Burmistrov; Russian: Михаил Фёдорович Бурмистров	150th High-Speed Bomber Aviation Regiment	Major	17 November 1939 †	Killed in action on 25 August 1939
Yuri Burmistrov; Russian: Юрий Васильевич Бурмистров	5th Guards Mechanized Regiment	Guards Private	18 December 1956 †	Killed self with grenade to avoid capture on 24 October 1956 in Budapest
Sergei Burnazyan; Armenian: Սերգեյ Բուռնազյան	866th Fighter Aviation Regiment	Senior Lieutenant	2 August 1944 †	Killed in action on 15 April 1943
Aleksandr Burnashov; Russian: Александр Анфиногенович Бурнашов	457th Rifle Regiment	Senior Sergeant	25 September 1944	—
German Burov; Russian: Герман Петрович Буров	15th Division of the Azov Flotilla	Starshina 2nd Class	16 May 1944	—
Dmitry Burtsev; Russian: Дмитрий Петрович Бурцев	34th Guards Artillery Regiment	Guard Sergeant	16 October 1943	—
Kirill Burtsev; Russian: Кирилл Максимович Бурцев	493rd Anti-tank Artillery Regiment	Red Army Man	21 February 1945 †	Killed in action on 17 August 1944
Sergei Burchenkov; Russian: Сергей Васильевич Бурченков	34th Guards Artillery Regiment	Guards Senior Sergeant	10 April 1945	—
Josef Buršík; Czech: Josef Buršík	1st Separate Czechoslovak Rifle Brigade	Junior Lieutenant	21 December 1943	—
Andrey Buryndin; Russian: Андрей Александрович Бурындин	16th Guards Cavalry Regiment	Guards Sergeant-Major	31 May 1945	—
Yevgeni Burykhin; Russian: Евгений Иннокентьевич Бурыхин	6th Guards Anti-tank Artillery Regiment	Guards Senior Sergeant	19 April 1945	—
Mikhail Buryak; Russian: Михаил Иванович Буряк	997th Rifle Regiment	Red Army Man	24 March 1945 †	Killed in action on 9 May 1944
Nikolai Buryak; Russian: Николай Васильевич Буряк	247th Fighter Aviation Regiment	Senior Lieutenant	4 February 1944	—
Nikolai Busargin; Russian: Николай Матвеевич Бусаргин	932nd Rifle Regiment	Lieutenant	15 May 1946	—
Ivan Buslayev; Russian: Иван Ефимович Буслаев	213th Rifle Division	Colonel	26 October 1943	—
Fyodor Buslov; Russian: Фёдор Васильевич Буслов	136th Guards Ground Attack Aviation Regiment	Guards Senior Lieutenant	29 June 1945	—
Georgiy Butaev; Russian: Георгий Данилович Бутаев	712th Rifle Regiment	Lieutenant	17 October 1943 †	Killed in action on 5 October 1943
Semyon Butenin; Russian: Семён Иванович Бутенин	5th Separate Tank Battalion	Senior Sergeant	31 March 1943	—
Ivan Butenko; Russian: Иван Ефимович Бутенко	25th Guards Tank Brigade	Guards Lieutenant	10 January 1944	—
Leonid Butkevich; Belarusian: Леанід Уладзіміравіч Буткевіч	1331st Rifle Regiment	Lieutenant	25 October 1943	—
Aleksandr Andreevich Butko; Russian: Александр Андреевич Бутко	167th Guards Light Artillery Regiment	Guards Lieutenant Colonel	17 October 1943	—
Aleksandr Sergeevich Butko; Russian: Александр Сергеевич Бутко	667th Ground Attack Aviation Regiment	Senior Lieutenant	4 February 1944	—
Pyotr Butko; Russian: Пётр Клементьевич Бутко	1010th Rifle Regiment 266th Rifle Division	Junior Lieutenant	15 May 1946	—
Vasiliy Butkov; Russian: Василий Васильевич Бутков	1st Tank Corps	Lieutenant-General	19 April 1945	—
Leontiy Butkov; Russian: Леонтий Анисифорович Бутков	164th Guards Rifle Regiment	Guards Senior Lieutenant	16 May 1944	—
Pavel Butov; Russian: Павел Григорьевич Бутков	1339th Rifle Regiment	Red Army Man	17 November 1943 †	Died of wounds on 3 November 1943
Viktor Butorin; Russian: Виктор Васильевич Буторин	62nd Guards Cavalry Regiment	Guard Senior Sergeant	15 January 1944	—
Nikolai Butorin; Russian: Николай Васильевич Буторин	25th Guards Rifle Regiment	Guards Sergeant	16 October 1943	—
Viktor Butylkin; Russian: Виктор Васильевич Бутылкин	118th Artillery Regiment 69th Rifle Division	Lieutenant	30 October 1943	—
Ivan Butyrin; Russian: Иван Ульянович Бутырин	1st Tank Battalion	Guards Lieutenant	26 October 1943 †	Killed in action on 5 July 1943
Sergei Butyakov; Russian: Сергей Николаевич Бутяков	398th Tank Battalion	Junior Lieutenant	7 April 1940 †	Killed in action on 11 February 1940
Vasiliy Bufetov; Russian: Василий Иванович Буфетов	121st Separate High-Powered Artillery Brigade	Lieutenant	15 May 1946	—
Sergei Bufetov; Russian: Сергей Игнатьевич Буфетов	96th Artillery Regiment	Captain	18 November 1944 †	Died of wounds on 22 June 1944
Aleksei Bukhanov; Russian: Алексей Дмитриевич Буханов	36th Guards Bomber Aviation Regiment	Guards Lieutenant	27 June 1945	—
Filipp Bukhnin; Russian: Филипп Петрович Бухнин	783rd Ground Attack Aviation Regiment	Lieutenant	18 August 1945	—
Pyotr Bukhonka; Russian: Пётр Николаевич Бухонка	350th Separate Engineer Battalion	Red Army Man	19 March 1944	—
Vasiliy Bukhtiyarov; Russian: Василий Прохорович Бухтияров	1238th Self-propelled Artillery Regiment	Lieutenant	24 March 1945	—
Mikhail Bukhtyev; Russian: Михаил Артемьевич Бухтуев	15th Guards Tank Brigade	Guards Sergeant	22 August 1944 †	Killed on 25 June 1944 while committing the first known ramming of an armoured train with a tank
Pyotr Bukhtulov; Russian: Пётр Харитонович Бухтулов	1431st Light Artillery Regiment	Sergeant	15 May 1946	—
Andrey Buts; Russian: Андрей Фёдорович Буц	929th Rifle Regiment	Red Army Man	13 September 1944	—
Iosip Butsky; Ukrainian: Йосип Іванович Буцький	515th Rifle Regiment	Major	24 March 1945	—
Ivan Butsykov; Russian: Иван Иванович Буцыков	34th Guards Artillery Regiment	Guards Lieutenant Colonel	16 October 1943	—
Valentin Buchavi; Russian: Валентин Романович Бучавый	34th Bomber Aviation Regiment	Senior Lieutenant	15 May 1946	—
Boris Buchin; Russian: Борис Владимирович Бучин	136th Guards Ground Attack Aviation Regiment	Guards Senior Lieutenant	19 April 1945	—
Mikhail Bushilov; Russian: Михаил Иванович Бушилов	67th Guards Tank Regiment	Guards Sergeant-Major	10 January 1944	—
Aleksei Bushmakin; Russian: Алексей Петрович Бушмакин	16th Guards Mechanized Brigade	Guards Major	10 April 1945	—
Daniil Bushtruk; Russian: Даниил Иванович Буштрук	200th Guards Rifle Regiment	Guards Lieutenant Colonel	23 October 1943	—
Anton Buyuly; Russian: Антон Ефимович Буюклы	165th Rifle Regiment	Senior Sergeant	6 May 1965 †	Killed in action on 14 August 1945
Ivan Buyunkov; Russian: Иван Иванович Буянков	86th Rifle Regiment	Captain	29 October 1943	—
Viktor Buyanov; Russian: Виктор Николаевич Буянов	146th Fighter Aviation Regiment	Major	2 September 1943	—
Mikhail Buyanov; Russian: Михаил Кондратьевич Буянов	609th Rifle Regiment	Sergeant	24 March 1945	—
Nikolai Bykasov; Russian: Николай Владимирович Быкасов	156th Guards Fighter Aviation Regiment	Guards Senior Lieutenant	10 April 1945	—
Aleksei Bykov; Russian: Алексей Васильевич Быков	568th Rifle Regiment	Red Army Man	30 October 1943	—
Boris Bykov; Russian: Борис Иванович Быков	1176th Rifle Regiment	Sergeant	23 September 1944	—
Vasiliy Bykov; Russian: Василий Иванович Быков	3rd Torpedo Brigade of the Northern Fleet	Senior Lieutenant	5 November 1944	—
Vladimir Byakov; Russian: Владимир Иванович Быков	439th Anti-tank Artillery Regiment	Major	10 April 1945 †	Killed in action on 31 January 1945
Yegor Bykov; Russian: Егор Иванович Быков	39th Guards Rifle Regiment	Guards Corporal	10 April 1945 †	Killed in action on 25 January 1945
Ivan Bykov; Russian: Иван Михайлович Быков	32nd Guards Artillery Regiment	Guards Senior Lieutenant	2 June 1942	—
Ivan Bykov; Russian: Иван Михайлович Быков	446th Rifle Regiment	Senior Sergeant	27 February 1945	—
Leonid Bykov; Russian: Леонид Тимофеевич Быков	28th Tank Regiment	Guards Lieutenant	10 April 1945	—
Mikhail Ivanovich Bykov; Russian: Михаил Иванович Быков	17th Motorized Rifle Division	Lieutenant	7 April 1940 †	Killed in action on 26 February 1940
Mikhail Nikiforovich Bykov; Russian: Михаил Никифорович Быков	28th Guards Motorized Rifle Brigade	Guards Major	26 September 1944	—
Mikhail Semyonovich Bykov; Russian: Михаил Семёнович Быков	571st Ground Attack Aviation Regiment	Captain	15 May 1946	—
Nikolai Ivanovich Bykov; Russian: Николай Иванович Быков	215th Guards Rifle Regiment	Guard Colonel	24 March 1945	—
Nikolai Petrovich Bykov; Russian: Николай Петрович Быков	237th Ground Attack Aviation Regiment	Senior Lieutenant	1 July 1944	—
Yuri Bykov; Russian: Юрий Михайлович Быков	691st Rifle Regiment	Sergeant	16 May 1944	—
Leonid Bykovets; Russian: Леонид Александрович Быковец	28th Guards Fighter Aviation Regiment	Guards Senior Lieutenant	18 August 1945	—
Viktor Bykovsky; Russian: Виктор Иванович Быковский	224th Guards Rifle Regiment	Guards Lieutenant	26 October 1943	—
Yevgeny Bykovsky; Russian: Евгений Власович Быковский	5th Guards Fighter Aviation Regiment	Guards Junior Lieutenant	14 May 1965 †	Killed in action on 27 April 1943
Mikhail Bykovsky; Russian: Михаил Иванович Быковский	467th Rifle Regiment	Captain	15 January 1944	—
Vasily Bystrov; Russian: Василий Александрович Быстров	74th Guards Rifle Division	Guards Sergeant-Major	6 April 1945	—
Nikolai Bystrov; Russian: Николай Игнатьевич Быстров	996th Ground Attack Aviation Regiment	Senior Lieutenant	29 June 1945	—
Pavel Bystrov; Russian: Павел Дмитриевич Быстров	252nd Tank Regiment	Major	24 March 1945 †	Killed in action on 25 August 1944
Sergei Bystrov; Russian: Сергей Михайлович Быстров	Spanish Civil War Т-26 tank Unit	Junior Commander	31 December 1936 †	Killed in action on 9 November 1936
Boris Bystrykh; Russian: Борис Степанович Быстрых	99th Bomber Aviation Regiment	Senior Lieutenant	5 November 1942	—
Nikolai Bychkov; Russian: Николай Васильевич Бычков	685th Rifle Regiment	Sergeant	30 October 1943	—
Oleg Bychkovsky; Russian: Олег Анатольевич Бычковский	130th Separate Anti-tank Regiment	Lieutenant	22 February 1944 †	Killed in action on 8 October 1943
Aleksey Byakov; Russian: Алексей Иванович Бяков	725th Rifle Regiment	Red Army Man	21 March 1940	—

== Partisans ==
Name	Area	Date of award	Notes
David Bakradze; Georgian: დავით ბაქრაძე	Bryansk and Sumy resistance	7 August 1944	—
Ivan Bakulin; Russian: Иван Иванович Бакулин	Kharkiv underground	8 May 1965 †	Tortured to death on 24 September 1942
Grigory Balitsky; Ukrainian: Григорій Васильович Балицький	Bryansk underground	7 March 1943	—
Ivan Banov; Russian: Иван Николаевич Банов	Partisan organizer	4 February 1944	—
Yemelyan Barykin; Russian: Емельян Игнатьевич Барыкин	Gomel underground	1 January 1944	—
Yakov Batyuk Ukrainian: Яків Петрович Батюк	Partisan	8 May 1965 †	—
Ivan Bevs; Russian: Иван Васильевич Бевз	Vinnitsa underground	8 May 1965 †	Killed in action on 13 January 1943
Iosif Belsky; Belarusian: Іосіф Аляксандравіч Бельскі	Minsk ungerground	15 August 1945	—
Anastasiya Biseniek; Russian: Анастасия Александровна Бисениек	Dno resistance organization	8 May 1965 †	Executed on 13 October 1943
Ivan Bovkun; Ukrainian: Іван Михайлович Бовкун	Chernigov resistance	4 January 1944	—
Aleksei Bondarenko; Russian: Алексей Дмитриевич Бондаренко	Bryansk underground	1 September 1942	—
Vladimir Illarionovich Bondarenko; Russian: Владимир Илларионович Бондаренко	Gomel and Chernigov underground	2 May 1945 †	Killed in action on 6 November 1943
Hubertas Borisa; Lithuanian: Hubertas Borisa	Kanaus underground	1 July 1958 †	Tortured to death by the Gestapo on 27 April 1944
Aleksei Borovikov; Russian: Алексей Алексеевич Борканюк	Carpathian Mountains resistance	8 May 1965 †	Executed on 3 October 1942
Aleksei Borodi; Russian: Алексей Демьянович Бородий	Zhytomyr underground	8 May 1965 †	Executed on 30 May 1943
Timofei Borodin; Russian: Тимофей Степанович Бородин	Gomel underground	8 May 1965 †	Executed on 20 June 1942
Petr Braiko; Ukrainian: Петро Овсійович Брайко	Sydir Kovpak partisan unit	7 August 1944	—
Anton Brinsky; Russian: Антон Петрович Бринский	Interstate partisan organizer	4 February 1944	—
Ivan Bugaichenko; Russian: Иван Федотович Бугайченко	Zhytomyr underground	8 May 1965 †	Buried alive on 14 January 1943
Boris Bulat; Russian: Борис Адамович Булат	Belarusian resistance	15 August 1944	—
Tikhan Bumazhkov; Belarusian: Ціхан Піменавіч Бумажкоў	"Red October" partisan detachment in Belarus	6 August 1941	—
Oleg Bychok; Russian: Олег Сергеевич Бычок; Ukrainian: Бичок Олег Сергійович	Minsk Resistance	5 November 1944 †	Killed in action on 7 May 1944

== Arctic explorers ==
Name	Accomplishment	Date of award
Oleksiy Babenko; Ukrainian: Олексій Федорович Бабенко	First to land a Mi-4 helicopter at the North Pole	29 August 1955
Mikhail Babushkin; Russian: Михаил Сергеевич Бабушкин	Co-pilot of the first airplane to land at the North Pole	27 June 1937
Konstantin Badygin; Russian: Константин Сергеевич Бадигин	Second in Command of the Icebreaker Georgiy Sedov	2 March 1940
Nikolai Bekasov; Russian: Николай Михайлович Бекасов	Radio operator of the Icebreaker Georgiy Sedov	3 February 1944
Mikhail Prokofievich Belousov; Russian: Михаил Прокофьевич Белоусов	Captain on the icebreaker Joseph Stalin	3 February 1940
Viktor Borovkov; Russian: Виктор Дмитриевич Боровков	North-2 Expedition pilot	6 December 1949
Viktor Buinitsky; Russian: Виктор Харлампиевич Буйницкий	Crew member of the Icebreaker Georgiy Sedov	3 February 1940
Dmitry Butorin; Russian: Дмитрий Прокопьевич Буторин	Crew member of the Icebreaker Georgiy Sedov	3 February 1940

== Test pilots ==
Name	Accomplishment	Date of award
Georgy Baydukov; Russian: Георгий Филиппович Байдуков	Non-stop flight across Arctic Ocean on an ANT-25	24 July 1936
Grigory Bakhchivandzhi; Russian: Григорий Яковлевич Бахчиванджи	Performed tests on the Bereznyak-Isayev BI-1	28 April 1973 †
Oleksandr Bezhevets; Ukrainian: Олександр Савович Бежевець	Testing the MiG-25R and flying 50 reconnaissance sorties. Also tested the MiG-23B, MiG-27K, MiG-31, MiG-29, and An-124 among other aircraft.	3 April 1975
Nikolai Bezdetnov; Russian: Николай Павлович Бездетнов	Tested numerous helicopters including the Ka-25, Ka-27, Ka-50, Mil Mi-2, Mil Mi-4, and Mil Mi-8.	25 July 1985
Boris Nikolaevich Biryukov; Russian: Борис Николаевич Бирюков	Tested the MiG-17 and MiG-19.	1 May 1957
Stanislav Bliznyuk; Russian: Станислав Григорьевич Близнюк	Tested Il-62M, Il-86, Il-96-300, Il-102, and Il-38 aircraft.	5 February 1990
Fyodor Bogdanov; Russian: Фёдор Дмитриевич Богданов	Performed 38 bailout tests on an Il-28	16 September 1957
Vasili Petrovich Borisov; Russian: Василий Петрович Борисов	Tested Tu-104, Tu-134, Tu-144, Tu-154, and Tu-22 aircraft and their respective variants.	26 April 1971
Sergei Brovtsev; Russian: Сергей Георгиевич Бровцев	Tested the Yak-24, Yak-100, Mil Mi-6, Mil Mi-1, Ka-15, Il-10, La-7, La-9, and MiG-9.	25 June 1958
Aleksandr Bryandinsky; Russian: Александр Матвеевич Бряндинский	Tested Tupolev TB-3, Petlyakov Pe-8, and Ilyushin DB-3 bombers; set a distance record.	17 July 1938
Fyodor Burtsev; Russian: Фёдор Иванович Бурцев	Tested various aircraft including the MiG-15, MiG-17, MiG-19	22 July 1966

== Cosmonauts ==
Name	Mission	Date of award
Aleksandr Balandin; Russian: Александр Николаевич Баландин	Soyuz TM-9	11 August 1990
Pavel Belyayev; Russian: Павел Иванович Беляев	Voskhod 2	23 March 1965
Anatoly Berezovoy; Russian: Анатолий Николаевич Березовой	Soyuz T-5	10 December 1982
Valery Bykovsky; Russian: Валерий Фёдорович Быковский	Vostok 5 Soyuz 22	22 June 1963; 28 September 1976

== National leaders ==
Name	Role	Date of award	Notes
Ahmed Ben Bella; Arabic: أحمد بن بلّة	President of Algeria	30 April 1964	Socialist Revolutionary from the National Liberation Front
Leonid Brezhnev; Russian: Леонид Ильич Брежнев	General Secretary of the Communist Party of the Soviet Union	18 December 1966; 18 December 1976; 19 December 1978; 18 December 1981	All four were birthday gifts
