= Viktor Borodachev =

Russian aviator (1918–1968)

Viktor Ivanovich Borodachev
- Виктор Иванович Бородачёв
- Born: 23 August 1918; Shiroky village, RSFSR (located within present-day Zhirnovsky District)
- Died: 11 July 1968 (aged 49); Moscow, USSR
- Military career
- Allegiance: Soviet Union
- Branch: Soviet Air Force
- Service years: 1936–1968
- Rank: General-major of Aviation
- Conflicts: World War II; Winter War; Eastern Front
- Awards: Hero of the Soviet Union

Viktor Ivanovich Borodachev (Russian: Виктор Иванович Бородачёв; 23 August 1918 - 11 July 1968) was a Soviet Air Force Major general, World War II flying ace and Hero of the Soviet Union.
