= Mikhail Ivanovich Bondarenko =

Artillerist of the Soviet Army

Mikhail Ivanovich Bondarenko (1901–1943) (Russian: Михаил Иванович Бондаренко) was an artillerist of the Soviet Army during World War II. He was given the title Hero of the Soviet Union posthumously.
