= Mikhail Grigoryevich Bondarenko =

Hero of the Soviet Union (1912–1943)

Mikhail Grigoryevich Bondarenko (Russian: Михаил Григорьевич Бондаренко; 1912 – 8 November 1943) was a captain-lieutenant in Soviet Navy during World War II who was awarded the title Hero of the Soviet Union for his actions in the Kerch-Eltigen operation.
