= Deaths in January 1984 =

The following is a list of notable deaths in January 1984.

Entries for each day are listed alphabetically by surname. A typical entry lists information in the following sequence:

- Name, age, country of citizenship at birth, subsequent country of citizenship (if applicable), reason for notability, cause of death (if known), and reference.

== January 1984 ==
=== 1 ===
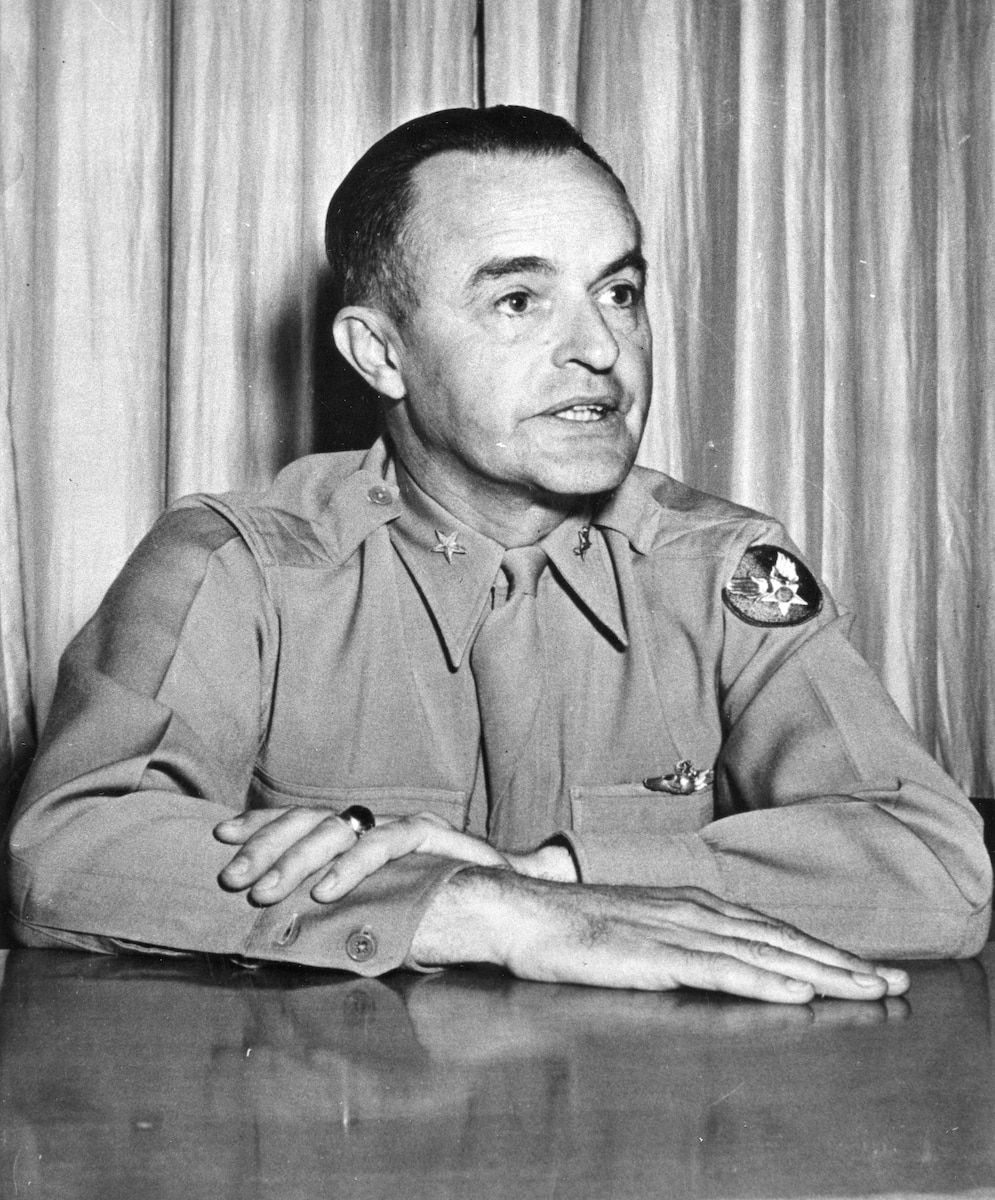
Hume Peabody

- Stephen Appleby, 71, English pilot
- A. E. Clouston, 75, New Zealand-born British test pilot and senior officer in the Royal Air Force
- David C. Eldredge, 62, American politician
- Max Ellmer, 73, Swiss tennis player
- Paula Grogger, 91, Austrian writer
- Walter Hennecke, 85, German admiral during World War II
- Billy Hill, 72, English gangster
- Kenzo Izutsu, 42, Japanese swimmer
- Alexis Korner, 55, British blues musician and broadcaster
- Joaquín Rodríguez Ortega, 80, Spanish bullfighter, lung cancer
- Hazel Measner, 58, Canadian pitcher
- Richard Parkhouse, 73, English cricketer
- Hume Peabody, 90, American career aviator and military officer
- Bent Blach Petersen, 59, Danish rower and Olympian
- Carleton Simmons, 78, American athlete, coach and financier
- Augustin Souchy, 91, Silesian anarchist, antimilitarist, labour union official and journalist
- Kaarlo Vähämäki, 91, Finnish gymnast
- Taufiq Wahby, 93, Kurdish writer, linguist and politician
- Allen Wheeler, 80, Royal Air Force officer and pilot

=== 2 ===
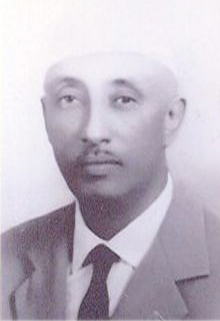
Haji Bashir

- Haji Bashir, 72, Somali politician
- Ivan Grove, 89, American football, basketball and track coach and college athlete
- Achmadi Hadisoemarto, 56, Indonesian soldier and politician
- Henry McKechnie, 68, Australian politician and wheat grower
- Leon Pape, 58, medical physicist
- Kenneth Sitzberger, 38, American diver
- Manuel Solis, 94, Mexican sports shooter and Olympian

=== 3 ===
- Karl Brugger, 42 or 43, German foreign correspondent and author
- Elizabeth Pickett Chevalier, 87, American writer
- Louis A. Craig, 92, American military officer
- David Dunkle, 72, American paleontologist
- Sebastià Juan i Arbó, 81, Spanish novelist and playwright
- Alfred A. Lama, 84, American architect and politician
- Fritz Mattick, 82, German botanist
- Fergus McDonell, 73, English film editor and director
- Morris Sugden, 64, British chemist who specialised in combustion research
- Ivete Vargas, 56, Brazilian journalist and politician

=== 4 ===
- Hisarlı Ahmet, Turkish ashik (b. 1908, exact age unknown)
- Wilfred Burns, 60, British town planner
- Owen Burrows, 80, Australian cricketer
- Jameson Clark, 76, Scottish actor
- Robert Firth, 65, American judge
- Richard Hughes, 77, Australian journalist
- Enoch Jenkins, 91, Welsh sports shooter and Olympian
- Constantin Krage, 83, Danish architect
- Julien Lefèvre, 76, Luxembourgish sculptor
- Gösta Lindh, 59, Swedish association football and Olympic medalist
- Abe Olman, 96, American songwriter and music publisher
- Frank Peratrovich, 88, American businessman and politician
- Orval Prophet, 61, Canadian country music performer
- Sir Kenneth Thompson, 1st Baronet, British businessman and politician
- Reza Zanjani, Iranian cleric

=== 5 ===
- Augusts Annuss, 90, Latvian painter
- Giuseppe Fava, 58, Italian writer and journalist, assassinated
- Reg Horne, 75, English professional golfer
- Alice Mendham Powell, 80, American progressive educator, college professor, and school founder
- Sushil Ramgoolam, 61, former First Lady of Mauritius
- Alfred Scott, 82, New Zealand cricketer
- Dmitri Vasilyev, 83, Soviet and Russian film director
- Vaclav Vytlacil, 91, American artist and art instructor

=== 6 ===
- Hermann Engelhard, 80, German middle-distance runner and Olympic medalist
- Icie Hoobler, 91, American biochemist
- Ernest Laszlo, 85, Hungarian-American cinematographer
- Surjit Singh Randhawa, 32, Indian field hockey player

=== 7 ===
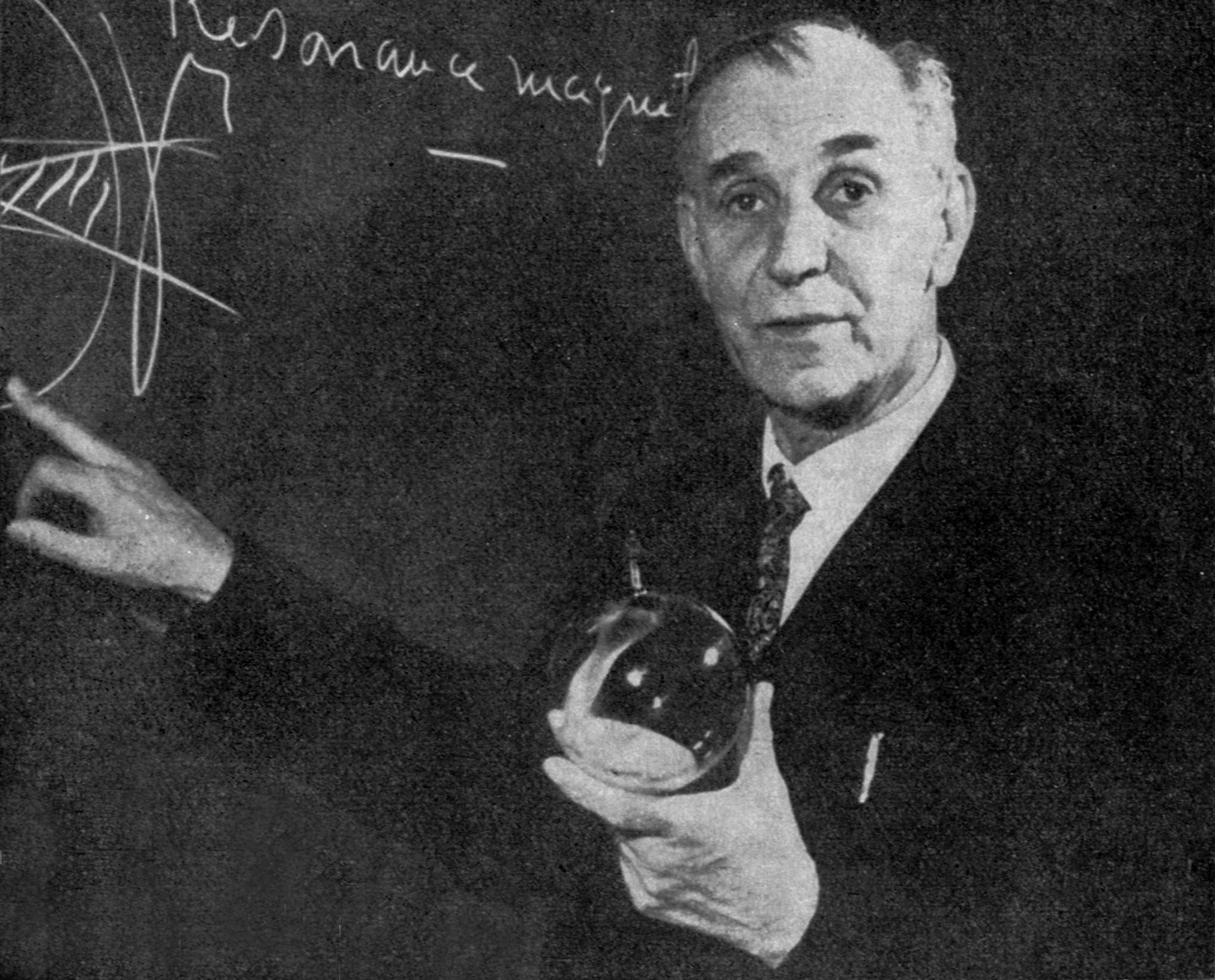
Alfred Kastler

- Costică Acsinte, 86, Romanian photographer
- Karl August Bühler, 79, German politician
- Siddheshwar Shastri Chitrav, 83, Indian Vedic scholar, lexicographer, translator and writer of Marathi literature
- Walter Forde, 85, British actor, screenwriter and director
- Alfred Kastler, 81 French physicist, Nobel Prize laureate
- Reginald Taylor, 74, English cricketer who played first-class cricket for Essex
- Ambroz Testen, 86, Franciscan and Croatian expressionistic painter

=== 8 ===
- Baba Sali, 94, Moroccan Sephardic rabbi and kabbalist
- Alexander Williams, 80, British colonial administrator

=== 9 ===
- Bob Dyer, 74, American vaudeville entertainer, singer, radio and television personality who was primarily active in Australia
- Frederick Gibberd, 76, English architect, town planner and landscape designer
- Seán MacEntee, 94, Irish Fianna Fáil politician
- Sir Deighton Lisle Ward, 74, 4th Governor-General of Barbados

=== 10 ===
- Alexander Brewer, 77, English first-class cricketer and British Army officer
- Toivo Loukola, 81, Finnish runner and Olympic gold medalist
- Souvanna Phouma, 82, Prime Minister of the Kingdom of Laos
- Ernest Albert Vasey, 82, a British politician and actor
- Laurie Wallis, 61, Australian politician
- Christopher Woolner, 90, British Army officer

=== 11 ===
- Fritz Geißler, 62, German composer
- Allie Lampard, 98, Australian cricketer
- Jack La Rue, 81, American actor, heart attack
- Ahmad Yunus Mokoginta, 62, Indonesian military officer and a signatory to the Petition of Fifty
- Karl Smidt, 80, German naval commander
- Erik Stensiö, 92, Swedish paleozoologist
- Gwyn Thomas, 91, Welsh rugby league footballer

=== 12 ===
- Marina Chechneva, 61, Russian "Night Witch" aviator during World War II
- Mohammad Tabrani, 79, Indonesian journalist and politician

=== 13 ===
- Fulvio Bernardini, 78, Italian football player and coach
- John Bolster, 73, British racing driver and journalist
- Ian Campbell, 81, Scottish painter
- Gustav Harteneck, 91, German general during WWII
- Themis Rigas, 39, Greek footballer

=== 14 ===
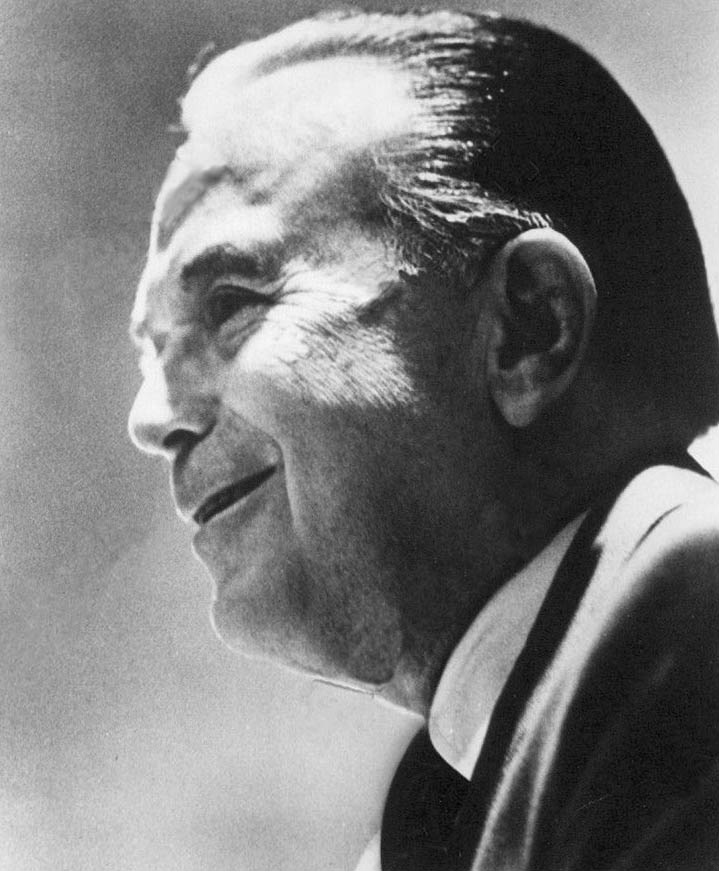
Ray Kroc

- Brooks Atkinson, 89, American theater critic
- Paul Ben-Haim, 86, Israeli composer
- Cipriano Elis, 76, Spanish racing cyclist
- Saad Haddad, 47 or 48, Lebanese military officer and militia leader
- Ray Kroc, 81, American entrepreneur, heart failure
- Dipya Mongkollugsana, 65, Thai oral surgeon, naval commander, and sports shooter
- Sidney Stretton, 81, English cricketer

=== 15 ===
- Vera Bell, 79, Jamaican poet, short-story writer and playwright
- Titus Burckhardt, 75, Swiss writer
- Fazıl Küçük, 77, Turkish Cypriot politician and a medical doctor who served as the first Vice President of the Republic of Cyprus

=== 16 ===
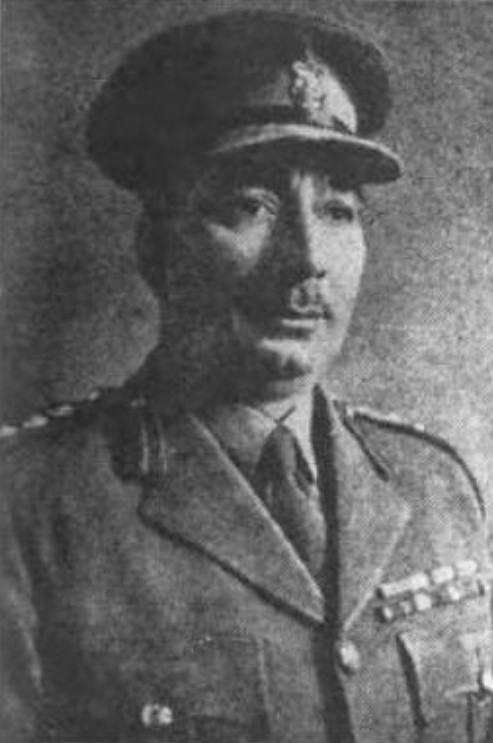
Mohammad Akbar Khan

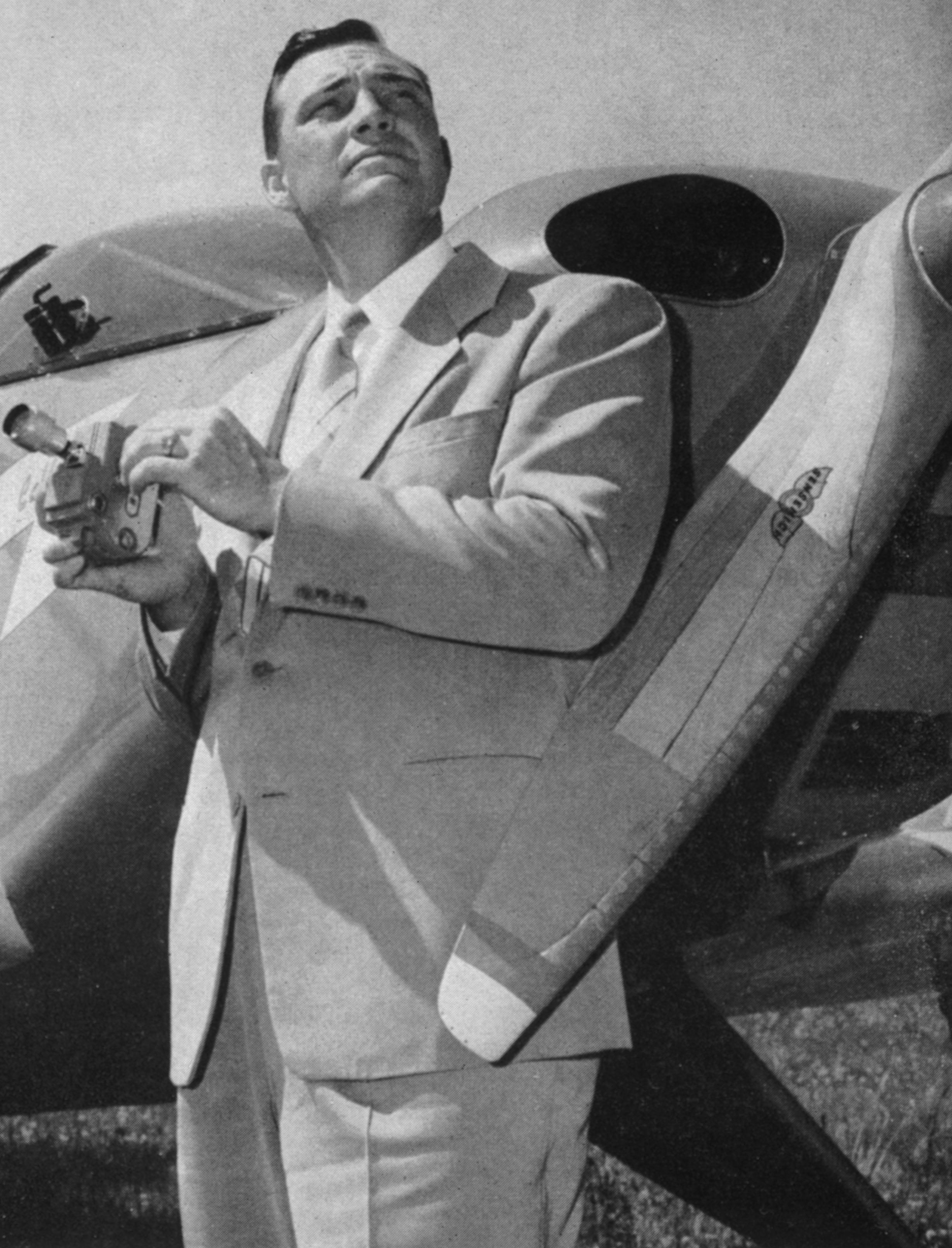
Kenneth Arnold

- Mohammad Akbar Khan, 89, Pakistani general, was the first Muslim Brigadier of the British Indian Army and the first native Major General of the Pakistan Army.
- Kenneth Arnold, 68, American aviator, businessman, and politician, his 1947 UFO sighting led the American press to coin the terms "flying saucer" and "flying disk" (or "disc") to describe the sighted objects, colorectal cancer
- León Dujovne, Argentine, 85, writer, philosopher, essayist and journalist
- Ivan Barchenko-Yemelyanov, 69, a Soviet Navy officer and Hero of the Soviet Union
- Józef Nowak, 58, Polish actor
- Frederick Scherger, 79, senior commander in the Royal Australian Air Force
- C. M. Stephen, 65, Indian politician
- Nikolai Yanenko, 62, Soviet mathematician and academician

=== 17 ===
- Ángel Arteaga, 55, Spanish musician and composer
- Birger Åsander, 74, Swedish actor
- Geoffrey Bell, 87, English cricketer and educator
- Kostas Giannidis, 80, Greek composer and pianist
- Marie Hall Ets, 88, American children's book writer & illustrator (In the Forest, Play With Me, Nine Days to Christmas).
- Helmut Mertens, 66, German fighter ace of World War II
- Rajarambapu Patil, 63, Indian politician
- George Rigaud, 78, Argentinian actor
- Trần Văn Hữu, 87, Prime Minister of the State of Vietnam
- Anna Martinowa Zarina, 76, Latvian artist

=== 18 ===
- José Carlos Ary dos Santos, 46, Portuguese poet, lyricist, and poetry reader
- Max Bentley, 63, Canadian professional ice hockey player
- Robert Hennion, 85, French film director
- Malcolm H. Kerr, 52, American academic who was president of the American University of Beirut at the time of his murder
- Lord Athol Layton, 62, English-Australian professional wrestler, amateur boxer, and professional wrestling commentator
- Panteleimon Ponomarenko, 81, Soviet statesman and politician
- Vassilis Tsitsanis, 69, Greek songwriter and bouzouki player

=== 19 ===
- Frances Dorothy Acomb, 76, American academic and historian
- Gösta Bengtsson, 86, Swedish sailor and Olympic gold medalist
- Robert Lucas, 79, Austrian Jewish writer
- Habibur Rehman, 58, Pakistani field hockey player and Olympic medalist
- Wolfgang Staudte, 77, German film director, script writer and actor

=== 20 ===
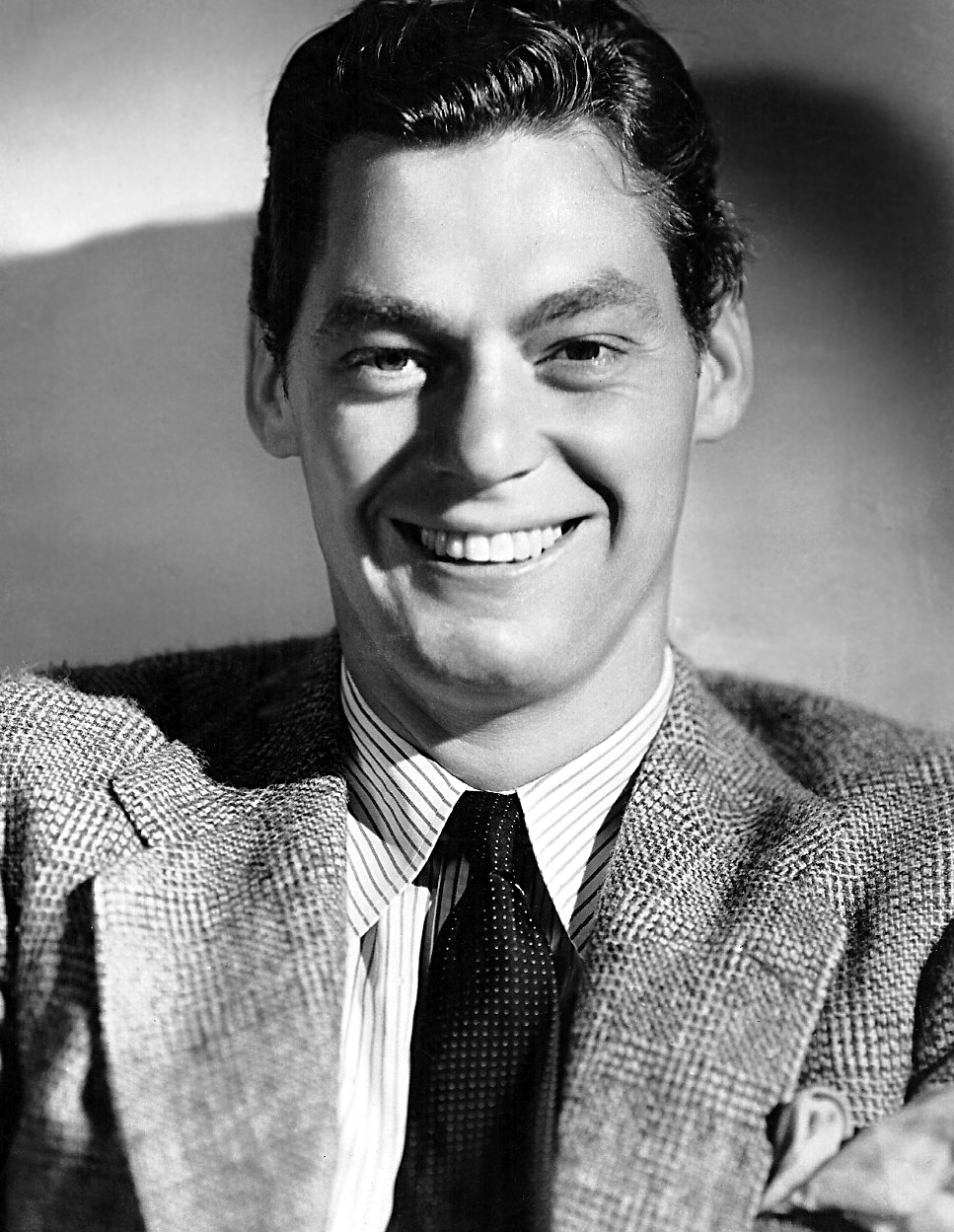
Johnny Weissmuller

- Charles Greville, 7th Earl of Warwick, 72, British peer and the last Earl of Warwick
- Hagbart Haakonsen, 88, Norwegian cross-country skier
- Richard Shorter, 77, English cricketer
- Artur Svensson, 83, Swedish sprinter and Olympic medalist
- Georg Thurmair, 74, German poet and hymnwriter
- Johnny Weissmuller, 79, Hungarian-born American swimmer and actor, pulmonary edema

=== 21 ===
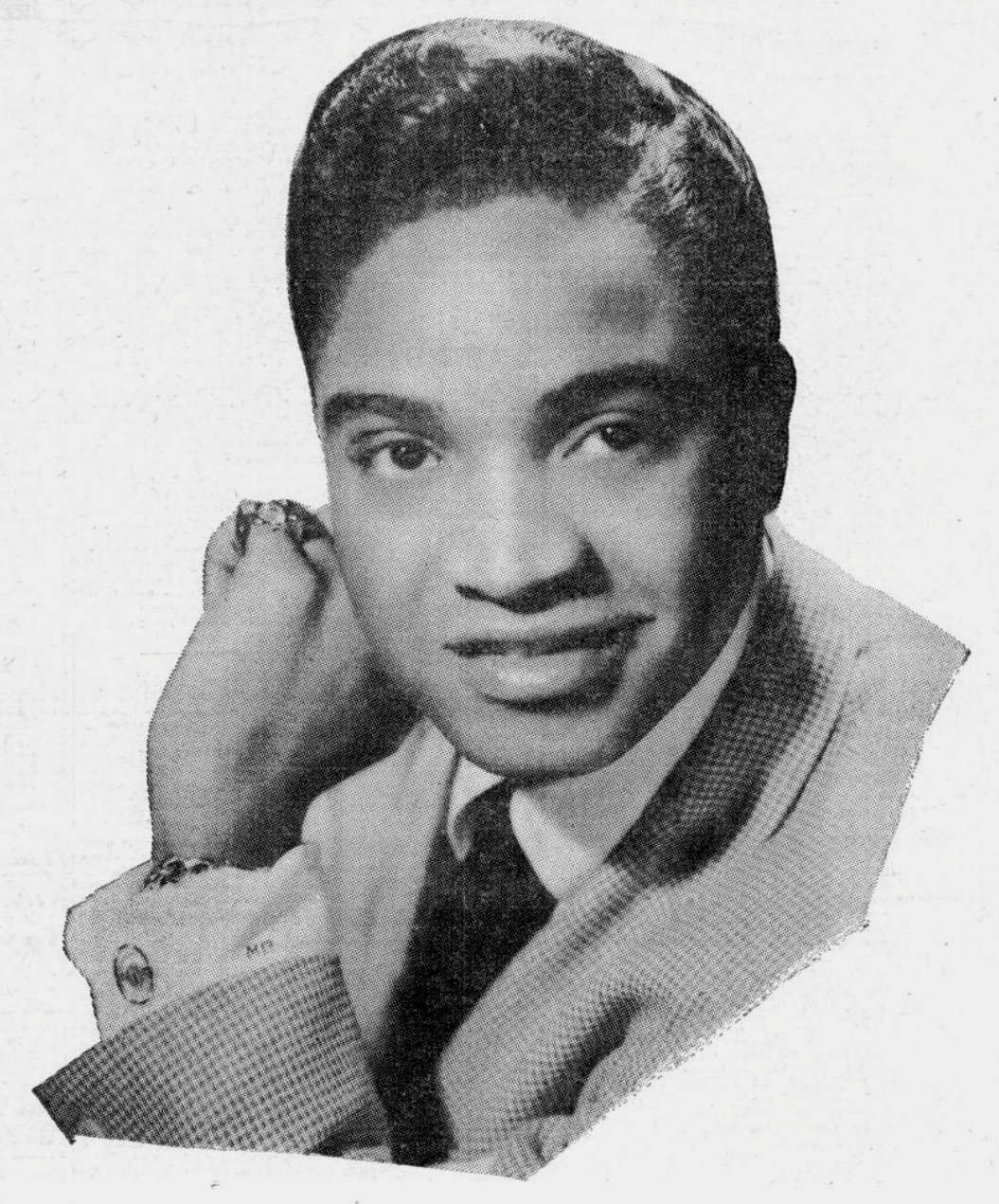
Jackie Wilson

- Roger Blin, 76, French actor and director
- Fang Ganmin, 77, Chinese French-trained painter, sculptor and educator,
- Archduke Gottfried of Austria, 81, claimant to the defunct throne of the Grand Duchy of Tuscany
- May Mills, 93, Australian sports administrator and educator
- Hywel Murrell, 75, British psychologist
- Edgar Percival, 86, Australian aircraft designer and pilot
- Giannis Skarimpas, 90, Greek writer, dramatist, and poet
- Grace Vaughan, 61, Australian politician
- Jackie Wilson, 49, American singer

=== 22 ===
- Fyodor Bakunin, 81, Soviet Army major general
- Noël Bowater, 91, English politician
- Campanal I, 71, Spanish footballer and sports manager
- John Factor, 91, Prohibition-era gangster and con artist, affiliated with the Chicago Outfit.
- Mikiel Gonzi, 98, Roman Catholic Archbishop of Malta
- Hisato Ichimada, 90, Japanese banker and politician
- Chaïm Perelman, 71, Belgian philosopher of Polish-Jewish origin
- Konstantin Pysin, 73, Soviet political figure
- Alexey Rantala, 42, bishop of the Orthodox Church of Finland
- Pavel Ștefan, 69, Romanian communist politician
- Josef Walcher, 29, Austrian Alpine skier

=== 23 ===
- Muin Bseiso, 57, Palestinian poet and playwright
- William Eyton-Jones, 89, British Merchant Navy Captain and master mariner
- Samuel Gardner, 92, American composer and violinist
- Marguerite Gautier-van Berchem, 91, Swiss archaeologist and art historian
- Dean Goffin, 67, New Zealand composer
- Sanapia, 88 or 89, Comanche medicine woman and spiritual healer
- Hans Christian Sørensen, 83, Danish gymnast
- François Lepenant, 90, French racing cyclist

=== 24 ===
- Bruce Cochran, 64, Canadian businessman, publisher, and politician
- Bernard Cowen, 51, Irish Fianna Fáil politician
- Kalervo Kinos, 78, Finnish gymnast

=== 25 ===
- Denton Massey, 83, Canadian engineer, Anglican priest and politician
- B. Puttaswamayya, 86, Indian novelist, playwright and journalist

=== 26 ===
- Edwin Boxshall, 86, British intelligence officer
- Baijnath Kureel, 63, Indian politician
- Olga Manuilova, 90, Soviet sculptor
- Leny Marenbach, 76, German actress
- Nathan Rocyn-Jones, 81, Welsh international rugby union player

=== 27 ===
- Mohamed Ahmed, 66, Comorian politician
- Douglas Camfield, 52, heart attack
- Margaret Gibb, 91, British political activist for the Labour Party in the North East of England
- Lucy Duff Grant, 89, British nurse, matron, President of the Royal College of Nursing
- Hans Krag, Norwegian writer, publisher, and translator
- Arthur Steiner, 87, Austrian writer and sports journalist

=== 28 ===
- Al Dexter, 78, American country musician and songwriter
- Abdur Rezzak Khan, 83, Bengali anti-British freedom fighter, communist revolutionary and politician
- John MacVane, 71, American broadcast journalist and war correspondent
- Sohrab Modi, 86, Indian stage and film actor, director and producer
- Bill Radcliffe, 66, Manx language activist, author, and teacher
- Eddie Keenan, 89, American football guard

=== 29 ===
- Frances Goodrich, 93, American screenwriter
- Humphrey Lestocq, 65, British actor
- Edzard Schaper, 75, German author
- John Macnaghten Whittaker, 78, British mathematician

=== 30 ===
- Susan Grey Akers, 94, American librarian and the first woman to hold an academic deanship at the University of North Carolina
- Crox Alvarado, 73, Costa Rican actor
- Andi Aziz, 59, Indonesian military officer
- Kenneth Burns Conn, 87, Canadian First World War flying ace
- Hilding Ekelund, 90, Finnish architect
- Alejandro Goicoechea, 88, Spanish engineer
- Luke Kelly, 43, lead singer of Irish band The Dubliners
- Anatoly Olizarenko, 47, Soviet cyclist
- Yangmaso Shaiza, 62 or 63, Indian politician

=== 31 ===
- Idris Al-Mutawakil Alallahi Shah of Perak, 59, 33rd Sultan of Perak
- Josef Charvát, 86, Czech doctor and endocrinologist
- George Harmon Coxe, 82, American writer, suicide
- Jack Egan, 79, Irish hurler
