= Charles Daly =

Charles or Charlie Daly may refer to:

- Charles Dudley Daly (1880–1959), known as Charlie, American football player and coach
- Charles P. Daly (1816–1899), American politician, author and president of the American Geographical Society
- Charles Daly firearms, U.S. firearms company
- Charlie Daly (1896–1923), member of the Irish Republican Army
- Chuck Daly (1930–2009), basketball coach

== See also ==
- Charles Daily (1900–1974), English first-class cricketer
- Charles Daley (1890–1976), Canadian politician
