= Viktor Leonov =

Soviet sailor (1916–2003)

Viktor Nikolayevich Leonov
- Виктор Николаевич Леонов
- Born: 21 November [O.S. 8 November] 1916; Zaraysk, Ryazan Governorate, Russian Empire
- Died: 7 October 2003 (aged 86); Moscow, Russian Federation
- Military career
- Allegiance: Soviet Union
- Branch: Soviet Navy
- Service years: 1937–1956
- Rank: Captain 2nd rank
- Conflicts: World War II
- Awards: Hero of the Soviet Union (twice)

Viktor Nikolayevich Leonov (Russian: Виктор Николаевич Лео́нов; 21 November [O.S. 8 November] 1916 – 7 October 2003) was a Soviet Navy officer and twice Hero of the Soviet Union. Considered a national legend in the Soviet era after the Second World War, he frequently gave speeches to Communist organizations about the war, but he became obscure after the fall of the Soviet Union.

== Early life ==
Leonov was born on 21 November [O.S. 8 November] 1916 in the city of Zaraysk to a working-class family. From 1931 to 1933, he studied at the school of factory apprenticeship at the Kalibr Plant in Moscow, where he worked as a pattern fitter and combining work with social activities. He also served as the member of the plant committee of the Komsomol, chairman of the workshop committee of inventors and head of the youth brigade. In 1937 he joined the Soviet Navy and was assigned to the Northern Fleet, where he completed a training course in the S.M. Kirov Training Squadron for Diving at the city of Polyarny. He was sent for further service on the submarine Shch-402.

== World War II ==
Following the start of Operation Barbarossa in 1941, Leonov sent a report on his enrollment in the 181st Separate Reconnaissance Detachment of the Northern Fleet, in which he conducted about 50 combat operations in the rear of the enemy since 18 July 1941. In 1942, he became a member of the Communist Party of Soviet Union. In December 1942, after being awarded an officer rank, he became a commissar, and a year later he was assigned to the 181st Special Reconnaissance Detachment of the Northern Fleet. In April 1944 he was promoted to lieutenant.

In October 1944, during the Petsamo-Kirkenes Offensive, the naval scouts under the command of Leonov landed on the shore occupied by the Wehrmacht, and for two days made their way to the designated point in the harsh off-road conditions, unable to make fire in order to warm up and prepare food. On the morning of October 12, they suddenly attacked the 88-mm battery at Cape Krestovoy. They managed to capture it and also capture a large number of German soldiers. When a boat with German soldiers attempted to make landing towards their position, Leonov along with a detachment of Ivan Barchenko-Yemelyanov repulsed the attacks, and captured about 60 enemy soldiers. This battle ensured the success of the Soviet landing in Liinakhamari, which led to capture of the port and city by Soviet forces. Thus, Leonov's detachment, by its actions, created favorable conditions for the landing of Soviet troops in the ice-free port of Liinakhamari and the subsequent capture of Petsamo and Kirkenes. For doing so he was awarded the title Hero of the Soviet Union for the first time on 5 November 1944.

After the defeat of Nazi Germany in May 1945, Leonov was assigned to the Far East where he took part in the Soviet–Japanese War in August 1945. As a front-line intelligence officer attached to the 140th Separate Reconnaissance Detachment of the Soviet Pacific Fleet headquarters, the unit under his command took part in the amphibious landing of the Soviet troops into Japanese-occupied Korea, where they landed at the port cities of Seishin, Genzan and Rajin-guyok, in the northeastern portion of the peninsula. At the port city of Genzan, the naval scouts under Leonov's command were credited with capturing and disarming 200 officers and 3500 soldiers of the Imperial Japanese Army in addition to capturing three artillery batteries, five aircraft and several ammunition depots, without suffering from a single casualty. Leonov received the title Hero of the Soviet Union for the second time on 14 September 1945.

== Later life ==
After the war, Leonov continued his military service in the Northern Fleet and in the Central Office of the Soviet Navy. In 1950 he graduated from the Caspian Higher Naval Red Banner School named after Sergei Kirov in Baku, Azerbaijan SSR, and in 1952, he was promoted to Captain 2nd Rank. From 1953 to 1956, he was a student of the Voroshilov Naval Academy in Leningrad, and graduated from the second year of the academy. In July 1956, he was transferred to the reserve. From 1957 to 1987, he worked as an engineer at the Research Institute of Petroleum Engineering in Moscow. He died in Moscow on 7 October 2003 and was buried in the Leonovskoye Cemetery.

== Awards and honors ==
=== Medals and decorations ===
USSR and Russia

- Twice Hero of the Soviet Union (5 November 1944 and 14 September 1945)
- Order of Lenin (5 November 1944)
- Two Order of the Red Banner (3 October 1942 and 18 December 1944)
- Order of Alexander Nevsky (10 April 1944)
- Order of the Patriotic War 1st class (11 March 1985)
- Medal "For Courage" (15 December 1941)
- Medal "For Battle Merit"
- Order of the Red Star
- Medal of Zhukov (1994)
- Medal "For the Defence of the Soviet Transarctic" (1944)
- Medal "For the Victory over Germany in the Great Patriotic War 1941–1945" (1945)
- Medal "For the Victory over Japan" (1945)
- jubilee medals

Foreign

- Order of the National Flag, 2nd class (North Korea)
- Medal for the Liberation of Korea (North Korea)

=== Memorials and commemorations ===
- Honorary citizen of Polyarny
- In his hometown of Zaraysk, a bronze bust was installed in his honor.
- In the city of Krasnodar, a street is named in honor of Leonov. In the same city, a bust of Leonov was installed at the entrance to school#11 in the fall of 2019.
- A children and youth sports school in Polyarny was named after Leonov.
- A Vishnya-class intelligence ship of the Russian Navy which was named Odograf, was renamed to Viktor Leonov in 2004. As of 2020, the ship continues to remain in active service.
- A monument of Leonov was unveiled at the headquarters of Russian Pacific Fleet Special Forces unit at Russky Island in Primorsky Krai.
- In 2016, on the 100th anniversary of the birth of Leonov, the Union of Military Sailors established and issued a commemorative jubilee medal "100 Years Since the Birth of Twice Hero of the Soviet Union, Captain 2nd Rank V.N. Leonov"
- In 2018, on the facade of the residence of the Russian survivalist Fyodor Konyukhov in Moscow, the Union of Military Sailors installed a memorial plaque in honor of Leonov.
