= Mendham =

Mendham may refer to:

- Mendham, Saskatchewan, Canada
- Mendham, Suffolk, England
- Mendham Borough, New Jersey, USA
- Mendham Township, New Jersey, USA

== People with the surname ==
- Alice Mendham Powell, Americana educator
- John Mendham, English MP
- Joseph Mendham, English clergyman and controversialist
- Peter Mendham, English former footballer
