= Sarojini Jugnauth =

First Lady of Mauritius

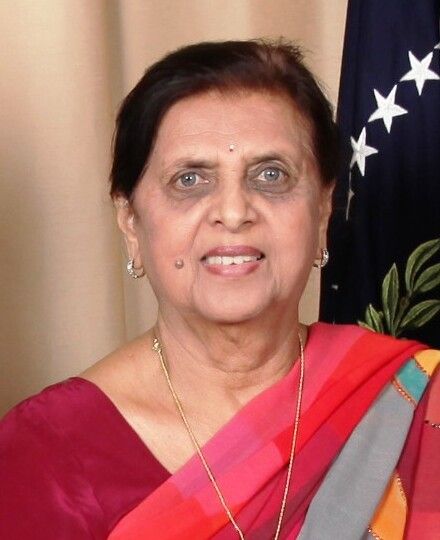
- Jugnauth in 2016

First Lady of Mauritius
- In role 7 October 2003 – 31 March 2012
- Preceded by: Marie Rose Danielle Offmann
- Succeeded by: Aneetah Purryag

Spouse of the Prime Minister of Mauritius
- In office 17 December 2014 – 23 January 2017
- Preceded by: Veena Ramgoolam
- Succeeded by: Kobita Jugnauth
- In office 12 September 2000 – 30 September 2003
- Preceded by: Veena Ramgoolam
- Succeeded by: Arriane Bérenger
- In office 30 June 1982 – 20 December 1995
- Preceded by: Lady Sushil Ramgoolam
- Succeeded by: Veena Ramgoolam

Personal details
- Born: Sarojini Ballah; 20 April 1938 (age 88) Quatre Bornes, British Mauritius
- Party: Militant Socialist Movement
- Spouse(s): Sir Anerood Jugnauth (1956–2021)
- Children: Pravind Jugnauth; Shalini Malhotra
- Occupation: Teacher, Spouse of Prime Minister, First Lady

Sarojini Ballah, Lady Jugnauth (commonly known as Lady Sarojini Jugnauth), is the widow of Sir Anerood Jugnauth, a former Spouse of the Prime Minister of Mauritius from 1982 to 1995 and from 2000 to 2003, most recently from 2014 to 2017. She was the First Lady of Mauritius from 2003 to 2012 when her husband served as President of the country. She is a primary school teacher by profession and is the mother of Shalini Malhotra and Pravind Jugnauth.

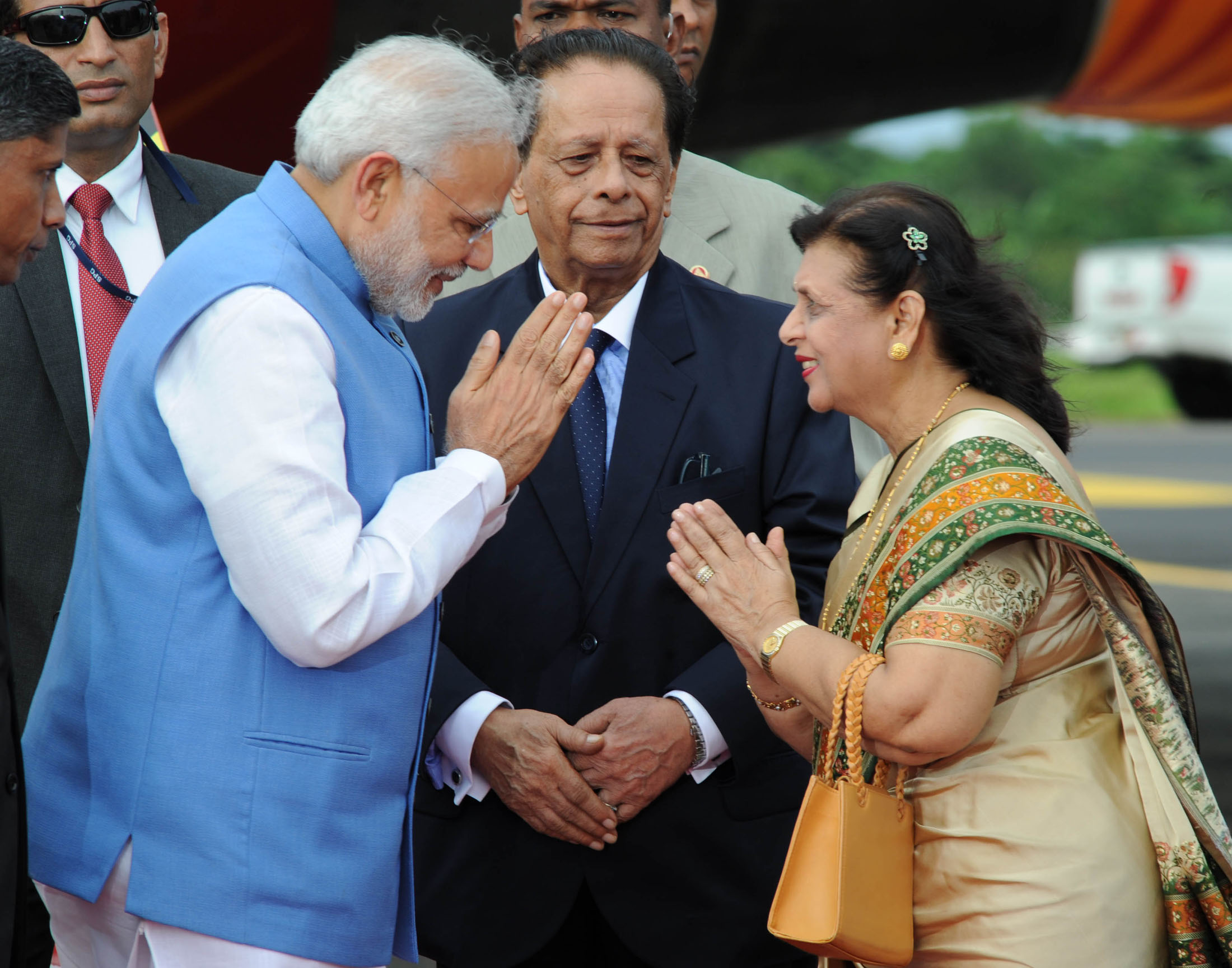
Jugnauth (right) and her husband (center) greet Indian Prime Minister Narendra Modi in 2015

She took an active role in social activities being the patron of various charitable organizations and also participates in various political activities in support of her family and party. Over the years, she generally retained a high approval rate as wife of the prime minister. She became a subject of controversy in 1992 when the bank of Mauritius issued a Rs. 20 note with her effigy on it. The inauguration of the note was done by her husband and other members of the government.

Due to various pressure from other political parties and unpopularity of then government, the note was subsequently removed from circulation while prime minister Jugnauth apologized in parliament stating that it was a mistake for which he was terribly sorry. The government collapsed in 1995 after losing the general elections.

== Personal life ==
Sarojini Ballah married Sir Anerood Jugnauth on 18 December 1956. They have two children, Shalini (Mrs Malhotra) and Pravind who was the Prime Minister of Mauritius between 2019 up to 10 November 2024. She is the grandmother of five grandchildren that is Anusha, Divya, Sonika, Sonali and Sara.
