= Paul Saltman =

American Professor of Biology (1928-1999)

- Born: April 11, 1928; Los Angeles, California, U.S.
- Died: August 27, 1999 (aged 71)
- Education: California Institute of Technology
- Known for: Establishment of Warren National University
- Awards: Most Valuable Professor, University of California, San Diego
- Scientific career
- Fields: Chemistry, Nutrition science
- Workplaces: University of California, San Diego, Procter and Gamble

Paul Saltman (April 11, 1928 – August 27, 1999) was an American biologist who was Professor of Biology at the University of California, San Diego, for more than three decades, and an internationally renowned nutrition expert. He received a B.S. in chemistry (1949) and Ph.D. in biochemistry (1953) from the California Institute of Technology. He commenced employment at the Keck School of Medicine at USC, until 1967, when he accepted the position of provost of Revelle College at the University of California, San Diego, "to bring undergraduate education to the same high level of academic excellence that marks the graduate program at the heavily science-oriented college." In 1972 Saltman was appointed Vice Chancellor for Academic Affairs. In 1980, he returned to full-time research and teaching at UCSD. After his death, from prostate cancer in 1999, the Paul D. Saltman Endowed Chair in Science Education was established by UCSD to recognize a distinguished senior member of Biological Sciences faculty for his/her commitment to, and success in teaching science. Saltman was married to Barbara Saltman for over 50 years, and is survived by sons David and Joshua, and five grandchildren.

== Contributions to nutritional science ==
Saltman's research focused on the chemistry, biochemistry and nutritional role of trace metals such as iron, copper, zinc and manganese. His approach to nutritional science made the point that it is an exact science, and can be accurately measured and tested. He often clearly differentiated between the concept of eating food, about which he noted: "food is not in itself a science, it is a sensual experience required for survival", and nutrition. Nutritional requirements, he maintained, could in theory be provided with total parenteral nutrition. "With TPN feeding all of the nutrients that a human being needs, from the time of infancy to the latter years, one can be maintained alive and well and growing without ever eating a morsel of food or drinking a drop of liquid."

His discoveries allowed for improvements in dietary and supplement strategies to prevent anemia, enhance physical performance and decrease the chance of heart disease. Clinical applications of his research included reduction of free radical damage to hearts, prevention of anemia, enhanced physical performance, and better bone and skeletal metabolism. His findings were of interest to the food industry and he was a consultant to Procter and Gamble, Mars and other food manufacturers. His academic writings are able to be purchased from Chemical and Engineering News, and are also held in the Mandeville Special Collections Library. His 1985 lecture in the Leon Pape Memorial Lecture Series reflected his overall philosophy, and was titled "Science Is With People: A Tribute to Leon Pape".

He was an advocate of eating all types of food, including red meat and occasional "junk food", while always stressing the importance of exercise and supplements. He wrote "The University of California San Diego Nutrition Book" as a popular science book for the layperson, and believed that science has a duty to assist and educate not only university students, but also the general public. He was "the antithesis of the ivory tower academic, and expanded his role as a teacher to include the public at large. He did a half-hour series called "Patterns of Life" for National Educational Television and a series for PBS." He was also considered an outstanding teacher, and an inspiration to his students. Robert C. Dynes, UCSD Chancellor wrote of him : " His love of learning, his enthusiasm for science, his communication skills, made him a role model for students and faculty alike. My tenure here has been enriched by knowing him—by his advice, his personal integrity, his passion for teaching and for life."

== Personal life ==
Saltman appeared as a contestant on the October 22, 1959, episode of Groucho Marx's TV quiz program You Bet Your Life.

Saltman died from prostate cancer on August 27, 1999, at the age of 71.
