= S. Chesterfield Smith =

American politician (1896–1969)

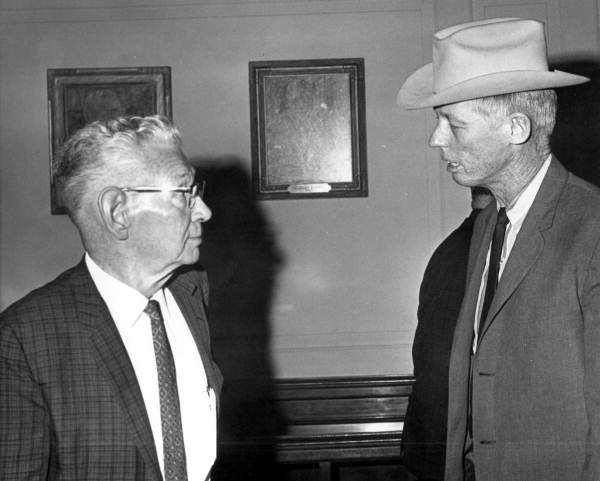
- Smith (left) with Doyle E. Carlton Jr., 1965

Member of the Florida House of Representatives from DeSoto County
- In office 1951–1966

Member of the Florida House of Representatives from DeSoto–Hardee–Highlands
- In office 1966–1967

Personal details
- Born: January 13, 1896 Arcadia, Florida, U.S.
- Died: March 1, 1969 (aged 73)
- Party: Democratic

S. Chesterfield Smith (January 13, 1896 – March 1, 1969), also known as S. C. Smith, was an American politician. He served as a Democratic member of the Florida House of Representatives.

== Life and career ==
Smith was born in Arcadia, Florida. He was a druggist.

Smith served in the Florida House of Representatives from 1951 to 1967.

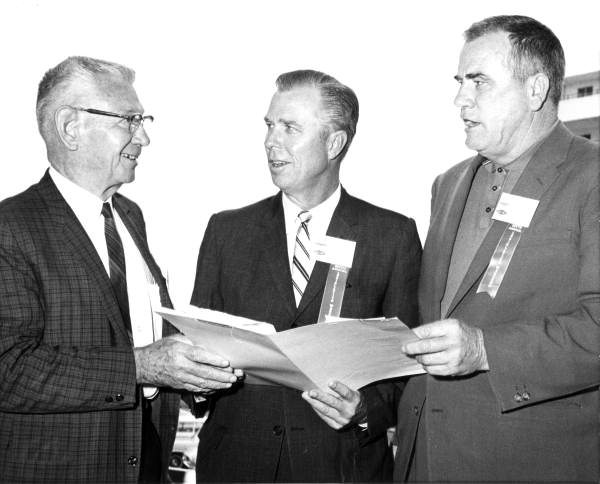
Smith (left) with David C. Eldredge and Luther C. Tucker, 1964

Smith died on March 1, 1969, at the age of 73.
