= Spouse of the prime minister of Mauritius =

Spouse of the Prime Minister of Mauritius
- Coat of arms of Mauritius
- Incumbent; Veena Ramgoolam since 13 November 2024
- Residence: Clarisse House
- Inaugural holder: Lady Sushil Ramgoolam
- Formation: 12 March 1968
- Salary: None

The Spouse of the Prime Minister of Mauritius is the title given to the wife or husband of the Prime Minister of Mauritius. To date it has been held by only five women with Veena Ramgoolam being the latest.

== Public role ==
The role of the Prime Ministerial Consort is not an official office and as such they are not given a salary or official duties, however, is still generally regarded as a public figure, frequently accompanying the prime minister on campaign and other public appearances, and often hosting dignitaries at the prime minister's residence. The spouse of the Prime Minister of Mauritius frequently participates in humanitarian and charitable work.

== List of spouses of the Mauritius prime ministers ==
Name	Term begins	Term ends	Prime Minister
Lady Sushil Ramgoolam	12 March 1968	30 June 1982	Sir Seewoosagur Ramgoolam
Lady Sarojini Jugnauth	30 June 1982	20 December 1995	Sir Anerood Jugnauth
Veena Ramgoolam	27 December 1995	11 September 2000	Dr. Navin Ramgoolam
Lady Sarojini Jugnauth	12 September 2000	30 September 2003	Sir Anerood Jugnauth
Arriane Bérenger	30 September 2003	5 July 2005	Paul Bérenger
Veena Ramgoolam	5 July 2005	17 December 2014	Dr. Navin Ramgoolam
Nandanee Oogarah-Soornack	5 December 2005	17 December 2014	Dr. Navin Ramgoolam
Lady Sarojini Jugnauth	17 December 2014	23 January 2017	Sir Anerood Jugnauth
Kobita Jugnauth	23 January 2017	13 November 2024	Pravind Jugnauth
Veena Ramgoolam	13 November 2024	Current	Dr. Navin Ramgoolam

== See also ==
- First Lady of Mauritius
- Prime Minister of Mauritius
- List of prime ministers of Mauritius
