= Kobita Jugnauth =

Spouse of former prime minister of Mauritius

The Honorable Kobita Jugnauth
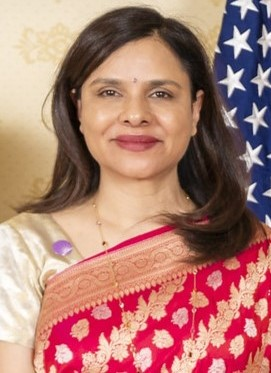
- Jugnauth in 2022

Spouse of the Prime Minister of Mauritius
- Assumed role 23 January 2017 – 13 November 2024
- Preceded by: Lady Sarojini Jugnauth
- Succeeded by: Veena Ramgoolam

Personal details
- Born: Kobita Ramdanee Mauritius
- Party: MSM
- Spouse: Pravind Jugnauth (m. 1992)

Kobita Jugnauth (née Ramdanee) is the wife of Pravind Jugnauth, the leader of the Militant Socialist Movement (MSM) and a former Prime Minister of Mauritius. She held the title of spouse of the Prime Minister from 2017 to 2024.

== Early life ==
Kobita is the daughter of Lady Ursule Jeannine Maunick (sister of Édouard Maunick) and Sir Kailash Ramdanee. Sir Kailash Ramdanee founded the Mauritius Pharmaceuticals Manufacturing Co. Ltd which pioneered the manufacture of medicines in Mauritius. Kobita completed her secondary education at Queen Elizabeth College, Mauritius.

Kobita Ramdanee married Pravind Jugnauth in 1992. They have three daughters: Sonika (born 1994), Sonali (born 1996) and Sara.
