= Pyrenula mattickiana =

Scientific classification
- Kingdom: Fungi
- Division: Ascomycota
- Class: Eurotiomycetes
- Order: Pyrenulales
- Family: Pyrenulaceae
- Genus: Pyrenula
- Species: P. mattickiana

Binomial name
- Pyrenula mattickiana Aptroot & Sipman (2013)
- Holotype: Serra dos Órgãos National Park, Brazil

Species of lichen-forming fungus

Pyrenula mattickiana is a species of corticolous (bark-dwelling) crustose lichen in the family Pyrenulaceae. The species forms smooth yellowish-brown crusts on tree bark and produces dark brown to black conical fruiting bodies 0.7–1.0 mm across that stand on the thallus surface. It is known only from its type locality in Serra dos Órgãos National Park in southeastern Brazil, where it was collected at elevations between roughly 1,600 and 2,000 m (5,200 and 6,600 ft).

== Taxonomy ==
This species was described as new by Harrie Sipman and André Aptroot in 2013. The holotype was collected by Fritz Mattick in Serra dos Órgãos National Park (Rio de Janeiro state, Brazil) at roughly 1,600–2,000 m elevation, along the track from Abrigo 2, on tree bark. The authors distinguished it from similar species such as P. circumfiniens based on spore features and by differences in ostiole position and endospore development.

== Description ==
This species produces smooth, yellowish‑brown crusts several centimeters across. The thallus is about 50–100 μm thick and lies mostly inside the bark, with only a thin, approximately 25 μm-thick cortical layer exposed. Its perithecia (fruiting bodies) are dark brown to black and conical, standing on the thallus surface. They measure 0.7–1.0 mm across and have heavily carbonized walls roughly 300 μm thick on the sides but much thinner at the base. There are no red, potassium hydroxide (KOH)‑reactive crystals in the walls. The pores are depressed and pale brown. The hamathecium is clear, with unbranched filaments about 1 μm wide. The asci are around 80 μm long and 10 μm wide and produce eight ascospores, usually in a single row. Each spore has three cross‑walls (septa) and measures 17–18 μm long by 6.5–7.5 μm wide. The spores are pale reddish brown with thin septa; the end chambers are rounded or triangular and the central chamber is elongated. A thickened inner wall is present at the tips. No asexual reproductive structures or diagnostic secondary metabolites are known to occur in Pyrenula mattickiana.

== Habitat and distribution ==
As of its original publication, Pyrenula mattickiana was known only from the original collection at the type locality in Serra dos Órgãos in southeast Brazil, growing on bark. No addition locations were reported in Aptroot and colleagues' 2025 compilation of Brazilian lichen species.

== See also ==
- List of Pyrenula species
