= Sushil Ramgoolam =

First Lady of Mauritius (1922–1984)

The Right Honorable Lady Ramgoolam

Spouse of the Prime Minister of Mauritius
- In office 12 March 1968 – 30 June 1982
- Monarch: Elizabeth II
- Preceded by: Position established
- Succeeded by: Lady Sarojini Jugnauth

Personal details
- Born: Sushil Ramjoorawon; 2 October 1922 Saint Aubin, Rivière des Anguilles, British Mauritius
- Died: 5 January 1984 (aged 61) State House, Le Réduit, Mauritius
- Party: Labour Party
- Spouse: Sir Seewoosagur Ramgoolam (1900–1985)
- Children: Navin Ramgoolam, Sunita Ramgoolam-Joypaul

Sushil Ramjoorawon, The Right Honorable Lady Ramgoolam (2 October 1922 – 5 January 1984; commonly known as Lady Sushil Ramgoolam) was the wife of the late Sir Seewoosagur Ramgoolam, father of the nation, leader of the Labour Party from 1959 to 1982, former Prime Minister of Mauritius (1968–1982) and former Governor General of Mauritius (1983–1985). She was First Lady of Mauritius while her husband was in office of Governor General and Prime Minister of Mauritius from 1968 to 1982. Her son Navin Ramgoolam has also been Prime Minister of Mauritius (1995–2000, 2005–2014, 2024–Present).

== Personal life ==
Sushil Ramgoolam born in Saint Aubin, Rivière des Anguilles, was the eldest daughter of Thacoordial and Anjanee Ramjoorawon. She had five sisters and two brothers. In 1939, at the age of 17, she married Seewoosagur Ramgoolam. They had a daughter, Sunita (now Mrs. Joypaul) and a son, Navin(chandra), who has been elected Prime Minister of Mauritius three times. She was married to Sir Seewoosagur Ramgoolam for 46 years.

On 5 January 1984, just after the new year celebrations, Lady Sushil died at the age of 61 at State House, Le Réduit and was given a state funeral.

== Memorial ==
Various public places such as a college in Triolet, a social welfare complex in Bel Air Rivière Sèche, a recreational center in Pointe Aux Piments and a Medi-Clinic in Flacq, among others, bear the name of Lady Sushil Ramgoolam.

== See also ==
- First Lady of Mauritius
- Spouse of the prime minister of Mauritius
- Veena Ramgoolam
- Sir Seewoosagur Ramgoolam
- Navin Ramgoolam
