= Luther C. Tucker =

American politician (1911–1966)

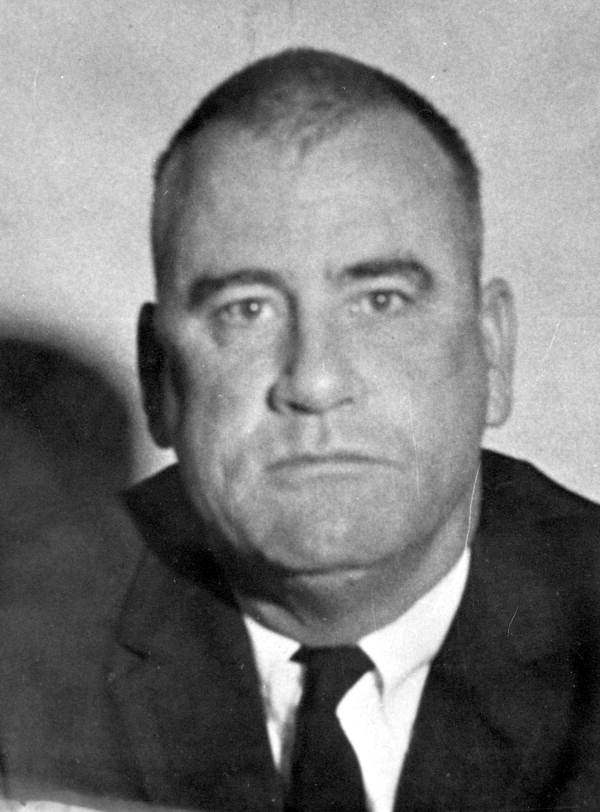
- Tucker in 1961

Member of the Florida Senate
- In office 1949–1951
- In office 1961–1963

Personal details
- Born: February 21, 1911 Hosford, Florida, U.S.
- Died: August 1, 1966 (aged 55) Wakulla County, Florida, U.S.
- Party: Democratic
- Children: 3; including Donald L. Tucker

Luther C. Tucker (February 21, 1911 – August 1, 1966) was an American politician. He served as a Democratic member of the Florida Senate.

== Life and career ==
Tucker was born in Hosford, Florida. He was a road contractor.

Tucker served in the Florida Senate from 1949 to 1951 and again from 1961 to 1963.

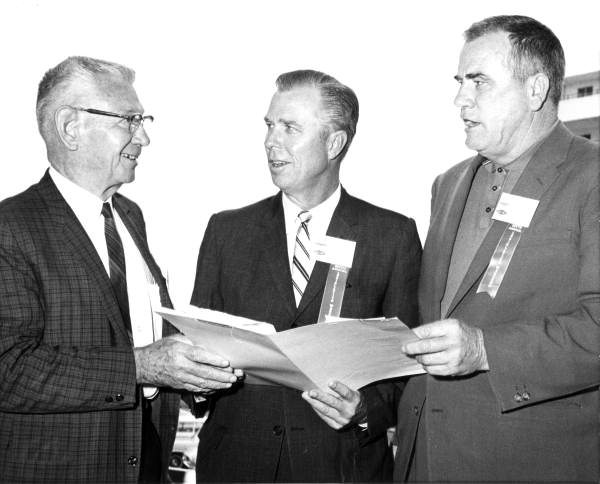
Tucker (right) with S. Chesterfield Smith and David C. Eldredge, 1964

Tucker died on August 1, 1966 in Wakulla County, Florida, at the age of 55.
