= Sidney Stretton =

English cricketer

Personal information
- Full name: Sidney Stretton
- Born: 20 November 1902; Stamford, Lincolnshire, England
- Died: 14 January 1984 (aged 81); Sutton-in-Ashfield, Nottinghamshire, England
- Batting: Left-handed
- Bowling: Left-arm fast

Domestic team information
- Years: Team
- 1928: Northamptonshire

Career statistics
Competition	First-class
Matches	1
Runs scored	1
Batting average	0.50
100s/50s	–/–
Top score	1
Balls bowled	192
Wickets	2
Bowling average	60.00
5 wickets in innings	–
10 wickets in match	–
Best bowling	1/120
Catches/stumpings	1/–
- Source: Cricinfo, 17 November 2011

Sidney Stretton (20 November 1902 – 14 January 1984) was an English cricketer. Stretton was a left-handed batsman who bowled left-arm fast. He was born at Stamford, Lincolnshire. He was registered at birth as Sydney Stretton.

Stretton made a single first-class appearance for Northamptonshire against Surrey at the County Ground, Northampton in the 1928 County Championship. In Northamptonshire's first-innings he was dismissed for a duck by Alan Peach, while in their second-innings he was dismissed for a single run by the same bowler. With the ball, he took the wickets of Charles Daily and Bob Gregory for the cost of 120 runs from 32 overs.

He died at Sutton-in-Ashfield, Nottinghamshire on 14 January 1984.
