= Clarisse House =

Official residence of the Prime Minister of Mauritius

- Location within Mauritius

General information
- Location: 37, Riverwalk - Vacoas, Vacoas, Mauritius
- Coordinates: 20°17′47.92″S 57°30′15.08″E
- Completed: 1860

The Clarisse House is the official residence of the Prime Minister of Mauritius at 37, Riverwalk Vacoas, Plaines Wilhems. It is frequently used for governmental conferences, summits and other official purposes, including the Prime Minister's New Year Speech. The current occupant of this house is the present Prime Minister, Dr. Navin Ramgoolam. The Prime Minister's Office is located at Port Louis.

== History ==
The house was originally built by Edmond de Chazal, he named it after his wife (née Claire Rouillard) 'Clary House'. The domains had an area of 2.25 hectares (5 88/160 acres).

== See also ==
- State House - Official residence of the president
- List of prime ministers of Mauritius
- Spouse of the prime minister of Mauritius
