= Richard Parkhouse =

English cricketer

Personal information
- Full name: Richard John Parkhouse
- Born: 2 March 1910; Clydach, Glamorgan, Wales
- Died: 1 January 1984 (aged 73); Hereford, England
- Batting: Right-handed

Domestic team information
- Years: Team
- 1939: Glamorgan
- FC debut: 15 July 1939 Glamorgan v Hampshire
- Last FC: 19 July 1939 Glamorgan v Surrey

Career statistics
Competition	First-class
Matches	2
Runs scored	0
Batting average	0.00
100s/50s	0/0
Top score	0
Catches/stumpings	0/–
- Source: CricketArchive, 12 April 2008

Richard John Parkhouse (2 March 1910 – 1 January 1984) was a cricketer. A right-handed batsman, he played internationals for Egypt and Nigeria and first-class cricket for Glamorgan.

== Biography ==
Born in Clydach in 1910, Richard Parkhouse started his cricket career playing for his local club and Llanelli in the 1930s before becoming a teacher in Egypt. Whilst in Egypt, he played for the Egyptian national side against HM Martineau's XI in Cairo in April 1939, scoring a century in the first innings.

In July of that year, he played his only two first-class matches for Glamorgan against Hampshire and Surrey. After World War II, he played two matches for Nigeria against the Gold Coast in Lagos$1 and eventually became a coach in Scotland.
