= Richard Shorter =

English cricketer

Personal information
- Full name: Richard Nicholas Shorter
- Born: 26 July 1906; Loughton, Essex, England
- Died: 20 January 1984 (aged 77); Drogheda, County Louth, Ireland
- Batting: Left-handed
- Bowling: Right-arm medium

Domestic team information
- Years: Team
- 1927–1929: Essex

Career statistics
Competition	First-class
Matches	23
Runs scored	108
Batting average	6.00
100s/50s	0/0
Top score	21
Balls bowled	1,557
Wickets	15
Bowling average	46.33
5 wickets in innings	0
10 wickets in match	0
Best bowling	3/14
Catches/stumpings	12/–
- Source: Cricinfo, 22 April 2012

Richard Nicholas Shorter (26 July 1906 – 20 January 1984) was an English cricketer. Shorter was a left-handed batsman who bowled right-arm medium pace. He was born at Loughton, Essex, and was educated at Repton School.

Shorter made his first-class debut for Essex against Nottinghamshire at Trent Bridge in the 1926 County Championship. He made 22 further first-class appearances for the county, the last of which came against Cambridge University in 1929. In his 23 first-class appearances, Shorter scored 108 runs at an average of 6.00, with a high score of 21. With the ball, he took 15 wickets at a bowling average of 46.33, with best figures of 3/14.

He died at Drogheda, County Louth, Ireland, on 20 January 1984.
