= Kalibr Instrument Plant =

Kalibr Plant

Kalibr Instrument Plant (Russian: Завод «Калибр») is a company based in Moscow, Russia.

The Moscow Kalibr Instrument Plant produces universal and specialized calibrating instruments for use by industrial plants and defense facilities, and has produced ordnance measuring devices for missile artillery organizations. The Kalibr plant is attempting to develop markets for its products in developing countries.

== History ==
At the beginning of 1931 the construction of the Kalibr plant, the first large specialized enterprise for the production of precision measuring instruments, which was commissioned in 1932, began near the village of Maryino.

Before the beginning of the Great Patriotic War, Kalibr produced calibers, micrometers, calipers, and end measures of length.

On October 16, 1941 the Kalibr plant was ordered by the State Defense Committee to stop work and evacuate the enterprise. It was necessary to dismantle, load, transport and install machine tools and other equipment in a new place as soon as possible, in new conditions to establish the supply of materials to the plant and begin to give the products needed by the front. It was decided to evacuate Kalibr to the Uzbek SSR, to the village of Chirchik near Tashkent. Initially, the train trains were heading towards Tashkent, but then the GKO decided to locate the plant in Chelyabinsk.

After the war, the list of products manufactured by the plant was gradually updated and expanded. In the 1960s, the production of control and measuring machines for automatic lines in mechanical engineering was intensively developed and the production of high-precision instruments (profilers, long gauges and special-purpose calibers) was increased.

The plant's products have received numerous awards from both All-Union and foreign exhibitions. Much attention was paid at that time to the automation of the production process. The workshops were equipped with flow-mechanized conveyor and automatic lines for the manufacture of micrometers and calipers of a new generation.

In 1971 the Kalibr plant was awarded the Order of the October Revolution. From 1937 to 1973 the volume of product production increased by more than 30 times.

== Kalibr Technopark ==
Nominally exists. Due to the low demand for products, the Board of Directors decided not to increase production volumes, but to conduct small-scale production of tools according to individual orders.

The Kalibr technopark has been organized in most of the territory of the enterprise, which offers premises for various purposes — offices, warehouses, conferences, small-scale production. A coworking with the same name is part of the infrastructure of the Kalibr Technopark. In the 4th quarter of 2019 the technopark plans to launch a new facility — Kalibr Park, a business center with parking.

On the territory there is a manufacturer of domestic complexes Skala-R, with production facilities and a demo room.
