= Konstantin Pysin =

Soviet politician (1910–1984)

- Константин Пысин

First Deputy Prime Minister of the Russian Soviet Federative Socialist Republic
- In office December 1964 – 1971
- Preceded by: Leonid Maximov

Minister of Agriculture
- In office April 1962 – 8 March 1963
- Premier: Nikita Khrushchev
- Preceded by: Mikhail Olshanski

Personal details
- Born: 12 December 1910 Ekaterinovka, Perm, Russian Empire
- Died: 22 January 1984 (aged 73) Moscow, Soviet Union
- Party: Communist Party

Konstantin Georgiyevich Pysin (Russian: Константин Георгиевич Пысин; 12 December 1910 – 22 January 1984) was a Soviet political figure who served as the minister of agriculture between 1962 and 1963. He was a member of the Communist Party and served in different positions in the party.

== Early life and education ==
Pysin was born in Ekaterinovka, Perm Governorate, on 12 December 1910. He studied at a pedagogy college in Kungur, Perm, between 1926 and 1929. He graduated from the Perm Agricultural Institute in 1935.

== Career ==
After graduating from the pedagogy college Pysin worked as a teacher in Vinsk from 1929 to 1931. Then he served as a zootechnician of the regional land department in Perm between 1935 and 1937. He worked as an assistant at the Perm Agricultural Institute from 1938 to 1941.

In 1939 he became a member of the All-Union Communist Party of Bolsheviks and was deputy secretary of the Perm regional committee of the party from 1943 to 1945. In 1945 he worked as a deputy at the Perm regional executive committee and was the secretary of the Perm regional committee between 1946 and 1947. From 1949 he worked in the Altai branch of the party serving in the regional executive committee (1949–1955). Psyin was a deputy of the Supreme Soviet in the third and fourth convocations between 1950 and 1970. He was the 1st secretary of the Altai regional committee from 1955 to 1961. He served as a member central committee of the Communist Party from 1956 to 1971.

In 1961 he was named as the deputy minister of agriculture which he held until 1962. He was appointed minister of agriculture in April 1962, replacing Mikhail Olshanski in the post. Pysin visited the United States for one month from September 1962 to reviews the farmlands in the West and Midwest regions. He was in office until 8 March 1963 when he was removed by Nikita Khrushchev from the post due to the failure in the agricultural production. He served as the inspector of the central committee in 1963. Pysin was named as the first deputy chair of the council of ministers of the Russian Soviet Federative Socialist Republic in December 1964, replacing Leonid Maximov in the post. Pysin's tenure lasted until 1971 when he retired from politics and public offices.

== Death ==
Pysin died on 22 January 1984 in Moscow.

=== Awards ===
Psyin was the recipient of the Order of Lenin (two times and the Order of the Red Banner of Labor (two times).
