= Hume Peabody =

American Brigadier General

George Hume Peabody
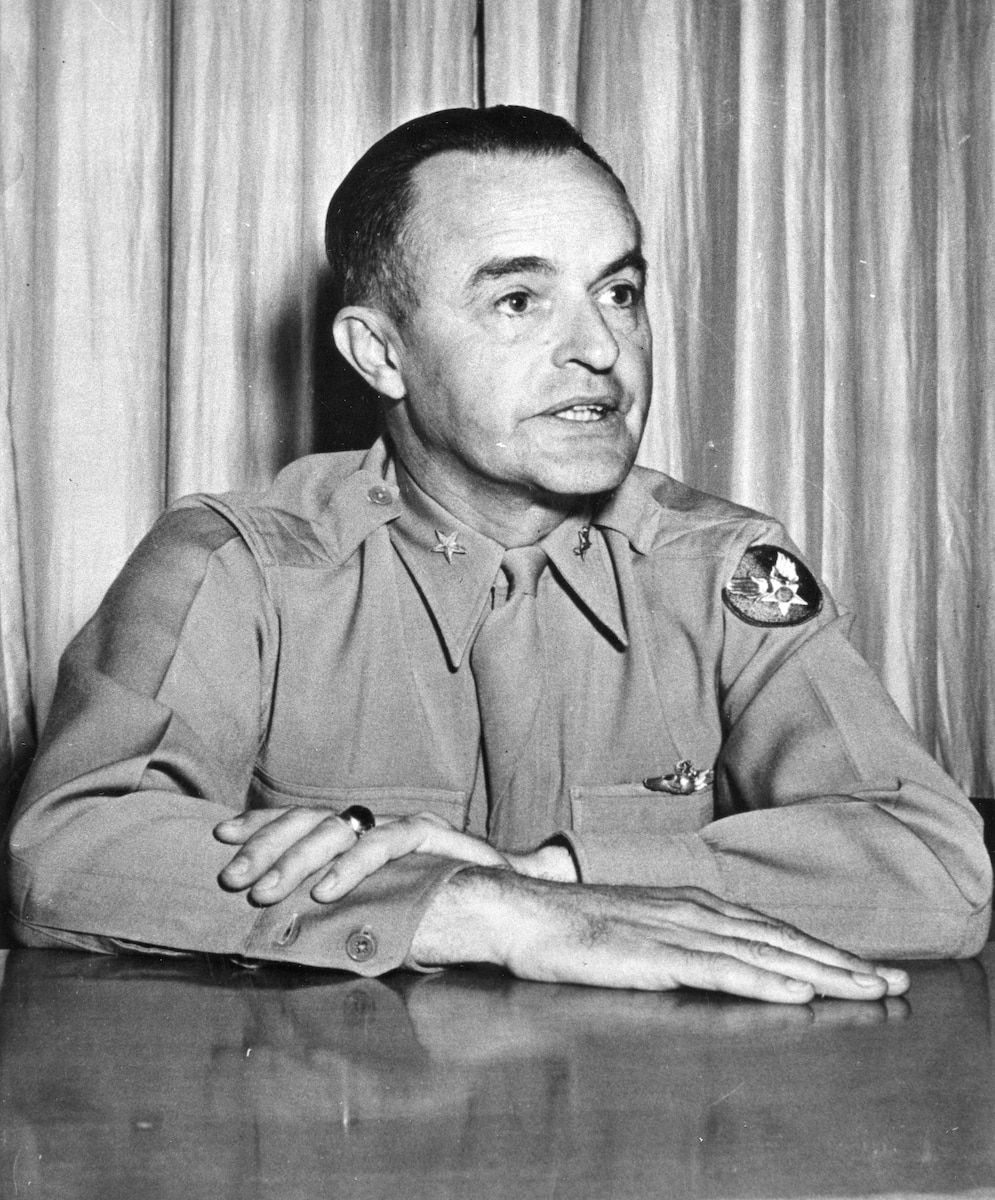
- Born: 24 November 1893; Shinglehouse, Pennsylvania, U.S.
- Died: 1 January 1984 (aged 90) Leonardtown, Maryland, U.S.
- Buried: Arlington National Cemetery, Virginia, U.S.
- Allegiance: United States
- Branch: United States Cavalry; United States Army Air Corps
- Service years: 1915–1946
- Rank: Brigadier General
- Commands: II Air Support Command; Army Air Forces School of Applied Tactics; III Tactical Air Command
- Conflicts: Mexican Expedition; World War I; World War II
- Awards: Army Distinguished Service Medal; Legion of Merit

Brigadier General Hume Peabody (24 November 1893 – 1 January 1984) was an American career aviator and military officer. A graduate of the United States Military Academy at West Point, New York, with the class of 1915, known as the class the stars fell on, he served with the 3rd Cavalry in the Mexican Expedition. During World War I, he became an aviator, and transferred to United States Army Air Service in 1920. Between the world wars, he was professor of military science and tactics at the University of California, Berkeley. from 1924 to 1928, and attended the Air Corps Tactical School, the Command and General Staff School, and the United States Army War College. During World War II he commanded the II Air Support Command, the Army Air Forces Tactical Center, and the III Tactical Air Command.

== Early life ==
George Hume Peabody was born in Shinglehouse, Pennsylvania, on 24 November 1893. He entered the United States Military Academy at West Point, New York, from which he graduated on 12 June 1915, ranked 63rd in his class. The class of 1915 became known as the class the stars fell on because more than a third of the class eventually became general officers. His classmates included Dwight Eisenhower and Omar Bradley, who became five-star generals.

== World War I ==
Peabody was commissioned as a second lieutenant in the 3rd Cavalry, which was stationed at Brownsville, Texas, on border patrol duty. and participated in the Mexican Expedition, and was involved in a skirmish with bandits at Tahuachal and at Villa Verde Ranches, Mexico, on 17 and 18 June 1916. He was promoted to first lieutenant on 1 July. In March 1917, the 3rd Cavalry moved to Fort Sam Houston, Texas, where he was promoted to captain on 3 July 1917.

On 28 August 1917, Peabody became a student officer at Signal Corps Aviation School, at Rockwell Field, near San Diego, California, from which he graduated on 13 December 1917. He remained there, with the rank of major in the Aviation Section, Signal Corps from 16 January 1918, until 2 February 1918, when he moved to Ellington Field, Texas. He then went to Eberts Field, Arkansas, on 19 March. On 10 May, he became a student officer at Massachusetts Institute of Technology. In September 1918, he went to Washington, D.C., where he served with the Training Section of the Air Service. He went to France on 7 October, where he joined the American Expeditionary Force.

== Between the wars ==
Peabody's service in France was brief; World War I ended in November 1918, and on 2 December, he returned to the United States, where he was stationed at March Field, California. He reverted to his substantive rank of captain on 27 February 1920, and transferred to the United States Army Air Service on 2 July. He was stationed at Luke Field in the Territory of Hawaii from 30 June to 10 November 1922, then returned to the United States, where he served at Crissy Field, California, until 4 May 1923, when he became a professor of military science and tactics at the University of California, Berkeley. He was promoted to major again on 18 September 1924.

After nearly four years as an instructor, Peabody became a student again. On 10 August 1928, he became a student officer at the Air Corps Tactical School at Langley Field, Virginia. He then went to Fort Leavenworth, Kansas, as a student officer at the Command and General Staff School on 25 June 1929. He officially changed his name to "Hume Peabody" in July 1930. In July 1931, he became an instructor at the Air Corps Tactical School, which was now located at Maxwell Field, Alabama. From July 1934 to June 1935, he was student officer at the United States Army War College in Washington, D.C. He was executive office of the 18th Composite Wing at Fort Shafter in the Territory of Hawaii from September 1935 to September 1937, with the rank of lieutenant colonel from 1 July 1936. He was a member of the Air Corps Board at Maxwell Field until November 1938, when he returned to Washington, D.C., as the chief of the Plans Division in the Office of the Air Corps.

== World War II ==
In September 1939, Peabody became the G-4 (logistics officer) on the staff of General Headquarters Air Force at Langley Field; it moved to Bolling Field, D.C., in June 1941. He became a temporary colonel on 1 March 1940, and then one in the wartime Army of the United States on 2 July 1941. He commanded the II Air Support Command at Oklahoma City, Oklahoma, from September 1941 until April 1942. He became a brigadier general on 16 April 1942. He then returned to Washington, D.C., as A-2 (intelligence officer) with the Air Staff. In June he became the director of War Organization and Movement at Headquarters, United States Army Air Forces. His son, Captain Hume Peabody Jr., graduated with the West Point Class of 1941, but was killed in an air crash in Gibraltar on 27 October 1942.

From November 1942 to March 1944, Peabody was the commandant of the Army Air Forces School of Applied Tactics in Orlando, Florida. It was redesignated the Army Air Forces Tactical Center on 1 November 1943. He was commanding general of the III Tactical Air Command from March to November 1944, when he went to the European Theater of Operations as director of post-hostilities planning at the headquarters of the United States Strategic Air Forces in Europe. He returned to the United States on 26 November 1945. His final assignment was as commanding general of the Eastern Flight Training from 2 March to 3 October 1946. He retired from the Army on a disability as a brigadier general on 31 October 1946.

== Death ==
He died in Leonardtown, Maryland, on 1 January 1984, and was buried in Arlington National Cemetery.

== Dates of rank ==
Insignia	Rank	Component	Date	Reference
	Second Lieutenant	3rd Cavalry	12 June 1915	
	First Lieutenant	3rd Cavalry	1 July 1916	
	Captain	United States Cavalry	3 July 1917	
	Major (temporary)	Aviation Section, Signal Corps	16 January 1918	
	Major (temporary)	United States Cavalry	30 July 1918	
	Captain (reverted)	United States Cavalry	27 February 1920	
	Major	United States Army Air Service	2 July 1920	
	Captain (reverted)	United States Army Air Service	4 November 1922	
	Major	United States Army Air Service	18 September 1924	
	Lieutenant Colonel	United States Army Air Service	1 July 1936	
	Colonel (temporary)	United States Army Air Corps	1 March 1940	
	Colonel	Army of the United States	2 July 1941	
	Brigadier General	Army of the United States	16 April 1942	
	Colonel (substantive)	United States Army Air Corps	1 December 1943	
	Brigadier General (retired)	Army of the United States	31 October 1946	
