= Paula Grogger =

Austrian writer (1892–1984)

- Born: 12 July 1892; Öblarn
- Died: 1 January 1984 (aged 91)
- Writing career
- Notable work: The Grimmingtor

Paula Grogger (12 July 1892 in Öblarn - 1 January 1984 in Öblarn) was an Austrian writer.

== Life ==
Paula Grogger was the daughter of the merchant Franz Grogger and his wife Maria from Öblarn in Styria. From 1907 to 1912, she attended the teachers training college of the Ursuline nuns in Salzburg. She was one of the few women at the time to take the Austrian matriculation examination, the Matura. She then returned to Styria and taught the Enns handicrafts until 1929.

He first novel, The Grimmingtor (1926), was a triumphant success and drew a picture of the Styrian landscape with the symbol of the mountain Grimming. The style, the criticism was simply, dialect and yet strong. Similar to the work of Enrica von Handel-Mazzetti, the novel was still independent, with hearty humor and restrained tragedy and high above the common literature. The book was repeatedly translated and republished.

Grogger belonged to the illegal Nazi Bund of German writers in Austria. After the Austrian Annexation, in 1938, she paid homage to Adolf Hitler in the Confession book of German poets. When the Gestapo, however, concerning Grogger's political stance, presented a request to the District Administrator of Gröbming, he replied on 6 November 1939: "To this day she made no positive contribution to National Socialism."

In 1952, she was awarded the Peter Rosegger Prize of the province of Styria. In 1966 she was appointed as a professor. She received honors including the Poet Steinschild of 1999, the Enrica-Handel-Mazzetti-special prize, the Silver Archduke Johann plaque, and the Ring of Honor of Styria.

She was deeply religious and interested in folklore, and was also involved in community theatre.

In 1980, she retired from literary activity at the age of 88 years, and she died at 91 years old, in her house in Öblarn, which serves today as a museum.

== Works ==
- 1917 Das Christkindl im Steirerland
- 1926 Das Grimmingtor
- 1927 Die Sternsinger, Das Gleichnis von der Weberin
- 1929/1977 Räuberlegende
- 1932 Das Röcklein des Jesuskindes
- 1933 Das Spiel von Sonne, Mond und Sternen
- 1935 Der Lobenstock
- 1937/1967 Die Hochzeit. Ein Spiel vom Prinzen Johann (ein Stück über Erzherzog Johann)
- 1947/1962 Bauernjahr
- 1949 Der Antichrist und unsere Liebe Frau
- 1954 Gedichte
- 1958 Die Mutter,Die Reise nach Salzburg
- 1962 Aus meinem Paradeisgarten
- 1975 Späte Matura oder Pegasus im Joch
- 1977 Der himmlische Geburtstag, Sieben Legenden, Die Räuberlegende
- 1980 Der Paradeisgarten
- 1983 Geschichte der Kindheit

Without date:

- Die Reise nach Brixen, Gestrickte Zirkuswelt, Die selige Jugendzeit, Vom Leben das Beste, Kinderszenen
- Die Legende von der Mutter, Die Legende vom Rabenknaeblein, Ein Stück aus meinem Garten
- Da Tag is' vorbei (Liedtext, Weise und Satz: Lorenz Maierhofer)

== Awards ==
- 1936 Austrian Cross of Merit for Arts and Science and Art 1st class
- December 1961 Ring of Honor of Styria
- 1968 Poet Steinschild of 1999 because Nazi revivalism prohibited association with the extreme right-wing cultural association poet stone Offenhausen
