= Siddheshwar Shastri Chitrav =

- Born: 1 February 1894; India
- Died: 7 January 1984 (aged 83)
- Occupations: Vedic scholar, writer
- Awards: Padma Shri

Siddheshwar Shastri Chitrāv (1 February 1894 - 7 January 1984) was an Indian Vedic scholar, lexicographer, translator and writer of Marathi literature. Chitrav was credited with the translations of many upanishads into Marathi language. He also wrote many dictionaries such as Mahabhashayshabadkosh, Prachin Bharatiya Sthalakosha and Shri Ganesh Kosha.He established the Bhartiya Chitrakosh Mandal which later published three encyclopedias. He was honoured by the Government of India in 1970 with Padma Shri, the fourth highest Indian civilian award.

== See also ==
- Upanishad
- Vedas
