= Petition of Fifty =

Protest against Suharto's usage of Pancasila

The Petition of Fifty (Indonesian: Petisi 50) was a document protesting then President Suharto's use of state philosophy Pancasila against political opponents. Issued on 5 May 1980 as an "Expression of Concern", it was signed by fifty prominent Indonesians including former Army Chief of Staff Nasution, former Jakarta governor Ali Sadikin and former prime ministers Burhanuddin Harahap and Mohammad Natsir.

The critics suggested that: Suharto regarded himself as the embodiment of Pancasila; that Suharto regarded any criticism of himself as criticism of the philosophy of the Indonesian state; Suharto used Pancasila "as a means to threaten political enemies"; Suharto approved dishonourable actions by the military; soldiers' oaths were put above the constitution; and that soldiers were urged "to choose friends and enemies based solely on Suharto's assessment".

== Background ==
Intending to avert ideological threats from the left (i.e., Communism) and the right (i.e. political Islam), in 1978 the New Order government introduced compulsory instruction in the state philosophy, Pancasila, to government departments, schools, workplaces, etc., which attracted criticism and ridicule from intellectuals.

At a general meeting of the commanders of Indonesia's Armed Forces (ABRI) on 27 March 1980, President Suharto said that ABRI had promised to commit itself to not amending the Indonesian state philosophy of Pancasila or the 1945 Constitution. He went on to say, that as a socio-political force, ABRI had to choose the right political partners that had proved their desire to maintain Pancasila and the 1945 Constitution, because there were socio-political forces who had their doubts about them. He repeated these thoughts in a speech the following month marking the anniversary of the Indonesian Special Forces. These speeches prompted a spirited response, and led to the issuing of the Petition of Fifty, so called because it was signed by fifty prominent individuals.

== The document ==
EXPRESSION OF CONCERN

By the Grace of God, we the undersigned, who are a group of voters in the last general elections, express the deep concern of the people over the remarks of President Suharto in his speeches before a meeting of the Armed Forces commanders in Pekanbaru on 27 March 1980 and at the anniversary of the Koppassandha in Cijantung on 16 April 1980. We are concerned about President Suharto's speeches that:

a) Express the presumption that among our people who are working hard to develop although they are under an increasingly heavy burden, there is a polarisation between those who want to "preserve Pancasila" on one side and those who want to "replace Pancasila" on the other, such that there are concerns that new conflicts could arise between elements of society;
b) Misinterpret Pancasila such that it can be used as a threat against political opponents. In fact Pancasila was intended by the founders of the Republic of Indonesia as a means to unite the Nation;
c) Justify non-praiseworthy actions by the authorities to make plans to suspend the 1945 Constitution using the Seven Articles [Armed Forced Oath] and the Soldier's Oath as an excuse, despite the fact that it is not possible for these oaths to be above the 1945 Constitution;
d) Persuading the Armed Forces to take sides, not standing above all societal groups, but choosing their friends and enemies based on the based assessment of the authorities;
e) Give the impression that he is the personification of Pancasila such that any rumour about him is interpreted as being anti-Pancasila;
f) Make accusations there are efforts to take up arms, subvert, infiltrate or other evil efforts against the forthcoming general election
Given the thoughts contained in these speeches of President Suharto are an inseparable element of the implementation of governing the nation and of the forthcoming general election, we urge the representatives in the House of Representatives and People's Consultative Assembly to respond to the president's speeches on 27 March and 16 April 1980.

Jakarta, 5 May 1980

Signed

H.M. Kamal, A.Y. Mokoginta, Suyitno Sukirno, M. Jasin (Lt Gen (ret.)), Ali Sadikin, Prof Dr. Mr. Kasman Singodimedjo, M. Radjab Ranggasoli, Bachrun Martosukarto SH, Abdul Mu'thi SH (Bandung), M. Amin Ely, Ir. H.M. Sanusi, Mohammad Natsir, Ibrahim Madylao, M. Ch Ibrahim, Bustaman SH, Burhanuddin Harahap SH, Dra S.K. Trimurti, Chris Siner Key Timu, Maqdir Ismail, Alex Jusuf Malik SH, Julius Hussein SE, Darsjaf Rahman, Slamet Bratanata, Endy Syafruddin, Wachdiat Sukardi, Ibu Theodora Walandouw, Hoegeng, M. Sriamin, Edi Haryono, Dr. A.H. Nasution, Drs A.M. Fatwa, Indra K. Budenani, Drs. Sulaiman Hamzah, Haryono, S. Yusuf, Ibrahim G. Zakir, Ezra MTH, Shah, Djalil Latuconsina (Surabaya), Djoddy Happy (Surabaya), Bakri A.G. Tianlean, Dr. Yudilherry Justam, Drs. Med. Dody Ch. Suriadiredja, A. Shofandy Zakariyya, A. Bachar Mu'id, Mahjuddin Nawawi, Syafruddin Prawinegara SH, Manai Sophiaan, Moh. Nazir, Anwar Harjono, Azis Saleh and Haji Ali Akbar.

== Government response ==
The Petition was read in front of the members of the People's Representative Council (DPR) on 13 May 1980 in an effort to persuade the representatives to ask the president what he had meant by the two speeches. The delegation to the legislature was led by Maj. Gen. (ret.) Dr Azis Saleh. On 3 July 1980, 19 DPR produced a document containing two number of questions to the president. They asked whether the president agreed that the Expression of Concern contained important issues deserving the attention of all sides, especially the legislature and the government, and whether the people of Indonesia deserved a comprehensive and detailed explanation about the issues raised. These questions were passed on to the president in a letter on 14 July. The questions provoked a variety of reactions in the House. One DPR member, Soedardji, did not agree the president had to answer the questions. However, his party colleague Anwar Nuris said it was a normal part of the constitutional process.

On 1 August 1980, Suharto wrote to DPR Speaker Daryatmo with his response, enclosing a transcripts of his two speeches that prompted the "Expression of Concern". He wrote that he was sure the experienced DPR members would understand the meaning of the speeches, but that if they were still not satisfied, he suggested the members ask their questions to the appropriate DPR commissions in keeping with DPR standing procedures. The government would then be happy to provide additional explanations, through the defence minister/military commanders, especially about the issues raised by the "Petition of 50" [quotes in the original]. The DPR speaker told reporters that in his view, this response had paid attention to the 19 DPR members, and had shown respect for the DPR.

As the government controlled all committees, genuine public discourse was thus concluded and the "New Order" status-quo of dwifungsi, the unity of Golkar and ABRI, and the preeminence of Pancasila were re-asserted. In his Independence Day speech the same August, Suharto reiterated that "The one and only way for us to take is to implement development...[for which purpose] we must all be able to maintain dynamic regional stability." Suharto later revoked the critics' travel privileges, and forbade newspapers from printing their pictures or quoting them. Members of the group were unable to obtain bank loans and contracts. Suharto remarked: "I didn't like what the so-called Petition of Fifty did. I didn't like their methods, even more so because they called themselves patriots".
