= Ivan Barchenko-Yemelyanov =

Hero of the Soviet Union

Ivan Pavlovich Barchenko-Yemelyanov
- Ива́н Па́влович Ба́рченко-Емелья́нов
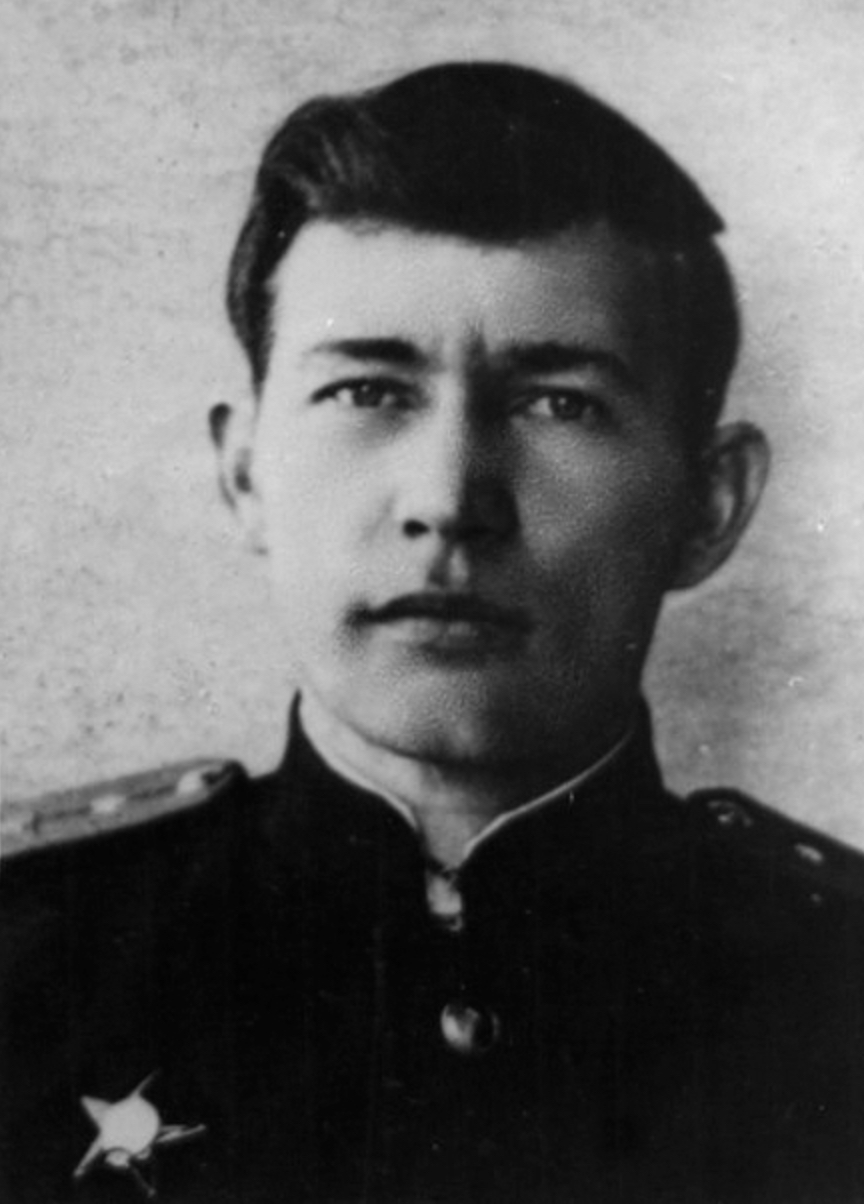
- Born: 4 January 1915; Vybut, Krestetsky Uyezd, Novgorod Governorate, Russian Empire
- Died: 16 January 1984 (aged 69); Leningrad, Russian SFSR, Soviet Union
- Military career
- Allegiance: Soviet Union
- Branch: Soviet Navy
- Service years: 1939–1961
- Rank: Colonel
- Conflicts: World War II
- Awards: Hero of the Soviet Union

Ivan Pavlovich Barchenko-Yemelyanov (Russian: Ива́н Па́влович Ба́рченко-Емелья́нов); (4 January 1915 - 16 January 1984) was a Soviet Navy officer and Hero of the Soviet Union.

== Early life ==
Barchenko was born on 3 January 1915 in the village of Vybut in Krestetsky Uyezd, to a peasant family. From 1930 to 1933, he studied at forestry colleges at Parfinsky District and Oranienbaum. He worked as an accountant-auditor and a transport technician at logging operations in Torbinsky timber industry enterprise in Okulovsky District.

In 1938, he joined the Soviet Naval Infantry. He graduated from the courses for junior lieutenants in 1941, at the city of Polyarny in Murmansk region.

== World War II ==
Following the start of Operation Barbarossa in June 1941, he commanded a reconnaissance platoon, then a company. On 1942, he served assistant chief of staff of the battalion of the 1st Consolidated Regiment of the 12th Naval Rifle Brigade of the Northern Fleet. He became a member of the Communist Party of Soviet Union on 1942. On 1943, he served as commander of the reconnaissance detachment of the Northern regions on the Sredny and Rybachy Peninsulas. Barchenko took part in Arctic naval operations, landing at Cape Pikshuev and conducted dozens of raids and landings behind enemy lines.

He distinguished himself during the Petsamo-Kirkenes Operation. During the breakthrough of the landing force to the port of Liinakhamari in Murmansk region, he was tasked with capturing the enemy's battery and stronghold at Cape Krestovy in order to support the landing operation in the port of Liinakhamari. On the night of October 10, 1944, the detachment landed on the shore of the Malaya Volokovaya Bay of the Murmansk region, occupied by the Wehrmacht. On October 12, 1944, the detachment led by him, after a 30-kilometer raid, captured the enemy's battery and stronghold at Cape Krestovy. When a boat with a Nazi soldiers attempted to make landing towards their position, Barchenko along with a detachment of Viktor Leonov repulsed the attacks, and captured about 60 enemy soldiers. This battle ensured the success of the Soviet landing in Liinakhamari, which led to capture of the port and city by Soviet forces. For doing so he was awarded the title Hero of the Soviet Union on 5 November 1944.

After the end of hostilities in the Arctic at the end of 1944, Captain Barchenko was transferred to the Dnieper Flotilla, where he participated in hostilities on the Oder River and other rivers within Poland and Germany, during the Battle of Berlin.

== Later life ==
After the war, Barchenko continued to serve in the Soviet Navy. From 1945 he served in the Baltic Fleet. From 1949 to 1953, he was a company commander of the cadets of the chemical faculty at the Military Engineering-Technical University in Leningrad. In 1961, Barchenko was in reserve, and then in retirement. From 1961 to 1963, he taught at the Leningrad Higher Naval School. From 1963, he worked in a research and production organization.

He died in Leningrad on 16 January 1984 and was buried at the Cemetery of the Victims of January 9.

== Awards and honors ==
"Gold Star" Hero of the Soviet Union (November 5, 1944)
Order of Lenin (November 5, 1944)
Order of the Patriotic War, 2nd class (1944)
Order of the Red Star, twice (1941, 1944)
Medal "For Battle Merit"
Medal "For the Defence of the Soviet Transarctic"
Medal "For the Capture of Berlin"
Medal "For the Victory over Germany in the Great Patriotic War 1941–1945"
Jubilee Medal "Twenty Years of Victory in the Great Patriotic War 1941-1945"
Jubilee Medal "Thirty Years of Victory in the Great Patriotic War 1941–1945"
Jubilee Medal "In Commemoration of the 100th Anniversary of the Birth of Vladimir Ilyich Lenin"
Jubilee Medal "30 Years of the Soviet Army and Navy"
Jubilee Medal "40 Years of the Armed Forces of the USSR"
Jubilee Medal "50 Years of the Armed Forces of the USSR"
Jubilee Medal "60 Years of the Armed Forces of the USSR"
Medal "Veteran of Labour"
Medal "In Commemoration of the 250th Anniversary of Leningrad"
Medal "For Impeccable Service", 1st class
