= Jack Egan (Cork hurler) =

Irish hurler

Personal information
- Born: 22 July 1904 Electric Terrace, Cork, Ireland
- Died: 31 January 1984 (aged 79) Wilton, Cork, Ireland

Sport
- Sport: Hurling
- Position: Midfield
Clubs
- Years: Club
- Glen Rovers; Blackrock
Inter-county
- Years: County
- 1926-1928: Cork
Inter-county titles
- Munster titles: 2
- All-Irelands: 2
- NHL: 0

Thomas John "Jack" Egan (22 July 1904 – 31 January 1984) was an Irish hurler who played as a midfielder for the Cork senior team.

Born in Cork city, Egan initially played hurling for the local Blackpool club Glen Rovers. He arrived on the inter-county scene when he first linked up with the Cork junior team. He joined the senior panel during the 1926 championship. Egan won two All-Ireland Senior Hurling Championship medals and two Munster Senior Hurling Championship. At club level, Egan won several championship medals in the different grades with Glen Rovers and later Blackrock.

He retired from inter-county hurling following the conclusion of the 1928 championship.

== Hurling career ==
=== Club ===
In 1924 Egan was a key member of the Glen Rovers team that reached the final of the junior championship for the first time. Dohenys provided the opposition, however, the game was so one-sided in favour of "the Glen" that Doheny's conceded after fifty minutes. It was Egan's first championship medal.

The following year Glen Rovers reached the final of the intermediate championship. A 7-2 to 2-3 defeat of Innicarra gave Egan a championship medal in that grade.

Egan later played club hurling with Blackrock.

=== Inter-county ===
Egan first appeared for Cork as a member of the junior team in 1925. After playing no part in Cork's run to the All-Ireland decider, he was included at right corner-forward for the delayed decider against Dublin. A 5-6 to 1-0 victory gave Egan an All-Ireland Junior Hurling Championship medal.

In 1926, in a season in which he captained his club's junior side, Egan was drafted onto the Cork senior panel. He was an unused substitute throughout the majority of the campaign, but collected a set of All-Ireland Senior Hurling Championship and Munster Senior Hurling Championship medals following respective defeats of Tipperary and Kilkenny.

Egan made his senior championship debut on 13 May 1928, in a 4-8 to 0-3 Munster semi-final defeat of Waterford. He was later dropped to the substitutes' bench, as Cork completed a clean sweep of Munster and All-Ireland titles once again.

== Personal life ==
Thomas John (Jack) Egan was born in Cork in 1904. His father was trade unionist and politician Michael Egan. Jack Egan worked at the Ford Motor Company factory in Cork for several decades. He died following a road traffic incident in January 1984, aged 79.

== Honours ==
=== Team ===
Glen Rovers

- Cork Intermediate Hurling Championship (1): 1925
- Cork Junior Hurling Championship (1): 1924

Cork

- All-Ireland Senior Hurling Championship (2): 1926 (sub), 1928 (sub)
- Munster Senior Hurling Championship (2): 1926 (sub), 1928 (sub)
- All-Ireland Junior Hurling Championship (1): 1925
- Munster Junior Hurling Championship (1): 1925 (sub)
