= Hisarlı Ahmet =

Turkish folk poet-singer

Ahmet Hisarlı (1908 – January 4, 1984), also known by the pen name Hisarlı Ahmet, was a Turkish ashik.

== Life ==
Born in the Yukarı Hisar neighborhood of Kütahya which was the centre of the old city. Spent his childhood and youth with his father. Learned to play trichord bağlama at "Gezeks" which young boys gather at, entertain and chat with each other. Learned to play clarinet at his military age and after he came back he moved to downtown. He opened a coffeehouse afterwards this coffeehouse been a place that all famous ashiks around the Anatolia came by. In here he taught to youngs how to play bağlama and sing.

Muzaffer Sarısözen invited him to TRT Ankara Radio Studios and proposed him to stay in Ankara but he refused. He changed his surname "İnegöllüoğlu" to "Hisarlı" which is used as a nickname.

On January 4, 1984, he died in Kütahya.

== Selected works ==
- Elif Dedim Be Dedim
- Kütahya'nın Pınarları Akışır
- Ben Kendimi Gülün Dibinde Buldum
- Feracemin Ucu Sırma
- Gar mı Yağdı Kütahya'nın Dağına
- Yağmur Yağar Her Dereler Sel Alır
- Hisardan İnmem Diyor (Menberi)
- Meşeden Gel A Sürmelim
- A İstanbul Sen Bir Han mısın
- Gidin Bulutlar Gidin
- Duman Vardır Güzel İzmir Başında
- Ah Hamamcı Bu Hamama Güzellerden Kim Gelir
- Altın Tas İçinde Kınam Ezdiler
- Portakalım Çaya Düştü
- Fincanın Dibi Noktalı
- Bedestene Vardım Şalvar İsterim
- Yasemen Dalına Yâr Neden Eğmeli
- Havada Durna Sesi Gelir
- Karanfil Oylum Oylum
- İki Bülbül Derelerde Ün Eder
- Depeköy Üstüne Tüfeng Asayım
- İğnem Düştü Yerlere
- Aydın Meşeleri Dalleri Yerde
- Çatal Çam Başına Goydum Keseri
- Mustafa'm Kaşların Kare
- Söğüt Dallerinde Beslenen Bülbül
- Şu Karşıki Dağda Bir Kuzu Meler
- Leyla'm Zülüflerin Çengeldir Çengel
- Gara Goyun Goyunların Beyidir
- Sıyırdılar Serpuşumu Başımdan
- Eremedim Vefasına Dünyanın
- Aya Bak Yıldıza Bak
- Merhaba
- Elveda
- Sabah Salası
