= Anna Martinowa Zarina =

- Born: Anna Zariņa; 17 September 1907; Riga, Latvia
- Died: 17 January 1984 (aged 76); Antwerp, Belgium
- Known for: Painting

Anna Martinowa Zarina (Latvian: Anna Zariņa; 17 September 1907 – 17 January 1984) was a Latvian artist who lived and worked in Belgium and primarily worked with oil paint.

== Biography ==
Zarina was born in Riga, Latvia, in 1907, and died in Antwerp, Belgium, in 1984. She attended the Latvian Academy of Art in 1928 and in 1935 received her diploma, afterwards moving to Antwerp. Zarina was a professor at the Royal Academy of Fine Arts (Antwerp) until 1972, with a particular focus on figurative painting.
