= Fritz Mattick =

German bryologist

Wilhelm Fritz Mattick
- Born: 17 May 1901; Dresden, German Empire
- Died: 3 January 1984 (aged 82); West Berlin, West Germany
- Education: Dresden University of Technology
- Scientific career
- Fields: Bryology
- Workplaces: Free University of Berlin
- Author abbrev. (botany): Mattick

Wilhelm Fritz Mattick (German: [ˈmatɪk]; 17 May 1901 – 3 January 1984) was a German botanist specializing in moss research (bryology).

== Biography ==
Mattick attended the teachers' seminary in 1914 and became a teacher in Dresden, where he also completed his studies. In 1927 he received his Dr. rer. techn. degree at the Dresden University of Technology. After he had already worked for some time at the Dresden University of Technology alongside his teaching activities as a research assistant, in 1931 he switched completely to scientific studies.

From 1932 to 1945 he was a research assistant at the Berlin Botanical Garden and Botanical Museum, where he was in charge of the lichen collection, and he was also in charge of plant-geographical mapping. For political reasons, an extension of his activity in Dahlem was refused in 1945. Mattick switched to Reinhold Tüxen's working group in Stolzenau and stayed there until 1947. From 1947 he was employed again in Dahlem and in 1953 was appointed curator.

In 1958, he became professor of plant geography at the Free University of Berlin. In 1959 Mattick founded the scientific journal Nova Hedwigia together with Johannes Gerloff, which focused on research on cryptogams such as mosses, lichens, fungi and algae; he was also the editor of Willdenowia magazine. His retirement took place in 1966, but he continued to work regularly at the museum afterwards.

Mattick built an index card catalog of lichen literature references published before 1950. Peter Scholz and Harrie J. M. Sipman continued the catalog. It is now available online and searchable as "Mattick's Literature Index".

Fritz Mattick died in West Berlin in 1984 at the age of 82. His grave is in the Dahlem forest cemetery.

== Eponymy ==
Mattick has had several taxa named in his honour, including the genera Mattickiolichen Tomas. & Cif. (1952) and Mattickiomyces Cif. & Tomas. (1953), and the species Hypotrachyna mattickiana Sipman, Elix & T.H.Nash (2009) and Pyrenula mattickiana Sipman & Aptroot (2013).
