= Leon Pape =

American medical physicist

- Born: February 8, 1925
- Died: January 2, 1984 (aged 58)
- Education: University of Southern California
- Known for: 4-MeV Van de Graaf Laboratory at CSU, Leon Pape Memorial Lecture Series
- Awards: Outstanding Professor Award, California State University, Los Angeles
- Scientific career
- Fields: Medicine, Physics
- Workplaces: California State University, Los Angeles, August Krogh Institute, Copenhagen

Leon Pape (February 8, 1925 – January 2, 1984) was a medical physicist who received his BSc, MSc (1953) and PhD (1965) in Physics from the University of Southern California. He became certified in radiological physics by the American Board of Radiology and from 1955 to 1962 he worked as a radiological physicist at the Cedars of Lebanon Hospital in Los Angeles. He served at the California State University Los Angeles as radiation safety officer and as professor of physics until 1971, and worked on the development of studies in biophysics, radiological health physics, and electron microscopy. He was elevated to departmental head of physics at Cal State Los Angeles, and advocated with the California legislature to secure adequate funding for the 4-MeV Van de Graaf Laboratory, unique to CSU system. From 1971 until his death he worked at the August Krogh Institute at the University of Copenhagen, Denmark, in the zoophysiological laboratory. His central research area was membrane biophysics.

== Select published works ==
=== Thesis ===
Pape, L. (1953). Report on investigation of asymmetrical resonance pressure broadening of the helium lambda5875 line.

=== Dissertation ===
Pape, L. (1965). Investigation of Some Structurally Related Characteristics of the Urinary Glycoprotein of Tamm and Horsfall (Doctoral dissertation, University of Southern California).

=== Articles ===
- Pape, Leon; Baker, S.; Gildenhorn, Hyman L. A Technic for Cross-Calibration of X-Ray Units Utilizing Half-Value-Layer Determinations
- Jacobs, Melville L.; Pape, Leon Dosimetry for a Total-Body Irradiation Chamber
- Springer, Elliott B.; Pape, Leon; Elsner, Fred; Jacobs, Melville L. High-Energy Radiography (Cobalt 60 and Cesium 137) for Tumor Localization and Treatment Planning

== Leon Pape Memorial Lecture Series ==
The Leon Pape Memorial Lecture Series was inaugurated by CSU after his "untimely death in January 1984 prompted the establishment of this lecture series in his memory, encompassing his many interests." The award of this Lectureship is highly prestigious, with many Nobel Laureates and prominent academics having delivered it since its inception.

- 1984 : "Radioactivity in the Service of Humanity"

Rosalyn S. Yalow, Nobel Laureate in Physiology or Medicine, 1977. Senior Medical Investigator, Veterans Administration Medical Center, New York

- 1985 : "Science Is With People: A Tribute to Leon Pape"

Paul Saltman, professor of biology, University of California, San Diego

- 1986 : "The Dilemma of Nuclear Weapons"

Marvin L. Goldberger, president and professor of physics, California Institute of Technology

- 1987 : "How Old is the Observable Universe?"

William A. Fowler, Nobel Laureate in Physics, 1983, institute professor of physics, emeritus, California Institute of Technology

- 1988 : "The Nature of Metals and Alloys"

Linus Pauling, Nobel Laureate in Chemistry, 1954, Nobel Laureate in Peace, 1962, research professor, Linus Pauling Institute of Science and Medicine

- 1989 : "The Life of the Stars"

Hans A. Bethe, Nobel Laureate in Physics, 1967, professor emeritus of physics, Cornell University

- 1990 : "A Brief History of the First 15 Billion Years"

Leon M. Lederman, Nobel Laureate in Physics, 1988, director emeritus, Fermi National Accelerator Laboratory and professor of physics, University of Chicago

- 1991 : "Visual Awareness"

Francis H.C. Crick, Nobel Laureate in Physiology or Medicine, 1962, J.W. Kieckhefer Distinguished Research Professor, Salk Institute for Biological Studies

- 1992 : "Simplicity and Complexity"

Murray Gell-Mann, Nobel Laureate in Physics, 1969, Robert Andrews Millikan Professor of Theoretical Physics, California Institute of Technology

- 1993 : "The Challenge of Drug Discovery"

Gertrude B. Elion, Nobel Laureate in Physiology or Medicine, 1988, Scientist Emeritus, Burroughs Wellcome Company

- 1994 : "Black Holes and Time Warps: Einstein's Outrageous Legacy"

Kip S. Thorne, Richard P. Feynman Professor of Theoretical Physics, California Institute of Technology

- 1995 : "Nuclear Weapons: Where Do We Go From Here?"

Sidney D. Drell, MacArthur Fellow, 1984–1989, professor and deputy director Stanford Linear Accelerator Center

- 1996 : "In Search of the Fundamental Building Blocks of Nature"

Samuel C.C. Ting, Nobel Laureate in Physics, 1976, Thomas Dudley Cabot Institute Professor, Massachusetts Institute of Technology

- 1997 : "Two Atmospheric Problems: Ozone Depletion and Global Warming"

F. Sherwood Rowland, Nobel Laureate in Chemistry, 1995, Donald Bren Research Professor of Chemistry, University of California, Irvine

- 1998 : "Superfluidity in Helium Three: The Discovery Through the Eyes of a Graduate Student"

Douglas D. Osherfoff, Nobel Laureate in Physics, 1996, MacArthur Fellow, 1981–1986, Professor of Physics and Applied Physics, Stanford University

- 1999 : "Holding onto Atoms and Molecules with Laser Light"

Steven Chu, Nobel Laureate in Physics, 1997, Theodore and Frances Geballe Professor of Physics and Applied Physics, Stanford University

- 2000 : "Electronic Structure of Matter: Wave Functions and Density Functionals"

Walter Kohn, Nobel Laureate in Chemistry, 1998, professor of physics, emeritus, and research professor, University of California, Santa Barbara

- 2001 : "Viruses: The Essence of Life, but Sneaky Critters"

David Baltimore, Nobel Laureate in Physiology or Medicine, 1975, National Medal of Science Recipient, 1999, President, California Institute of Technology

- 2002 : "Freezing Time"

Ahmed H. Zewail, Nobel Laureate in Chemistry, 1999, Linus Pauling Professor of Chemistry and professor of physics, California Institute of Technology

- 2003 : "Light at Bicycle Speed ...and Slower Yet!"

Lene Vestergaard Hau, MacArthur Fellow, 2001–2006, Gordon McKay Professor of Applied Physics and professor of physics, Lyman Laboratory, Harvard University

- 2004 : "Can Nuclear Weapons Proliferation Be Stopped?"

Wolfgang K. H. Panofsky, Ph.D., professor and director emeritus, Stanford Linear Accelerator Center, Stanford University

- 2005 : "What Can We Do With A Quantum Liquid?"

Anthony J. Leggett, Nobel Laureate in Physics, 2003, MacArthur Fellow, professor and advanced studies professor of physics, University of Illinois at Urbana–Champaign

- 2006 : "The Future of Physics"

David J. Gross, Nobel Laureate in Physics, 2004, director, Kavli Institute for Theoretical Physics, University of California, Santa Barbara, Frederick W. Gluck Professor of Theoretical Physics

- 2007 : "Small Wonders: The World of Nanoscience"

Horst L. Stormer, Nobel Laureate in Physics, 1998, Isidor Isaac Rabi Professor of Physics, Columbia University, New York, adjunct physics vice president, Bell Labs, Lucent Technologies, Murray Hills, NJ

- 2008 : "Why are we so excited about carbon nanostructures?"

Mildred S. Dresselhaus, Ph.D., Institute Professor of Electrical Engineering and Physics, Massachusetts Institute of Technology; President of the American Physical Society (1984) and president of the American Association for the Advancement of Science (1997)

- 2009 : "Unveiling a black hole at the center of our galaxy"

Andrea M. Ghez, Ph.D., professor of physics and astronomy, UCLA; MacArthur Fellow (2008); Sackler Prize(2004); National Academy of Sciences and American Academy of Arts and Sciences (elected)

- 2010 : "How Science Changed California and The West"

Kevin Owen Starr, PhD, professor of history at USC and California's state librarian emeritus.
