= David C. Eldredge =

American politician

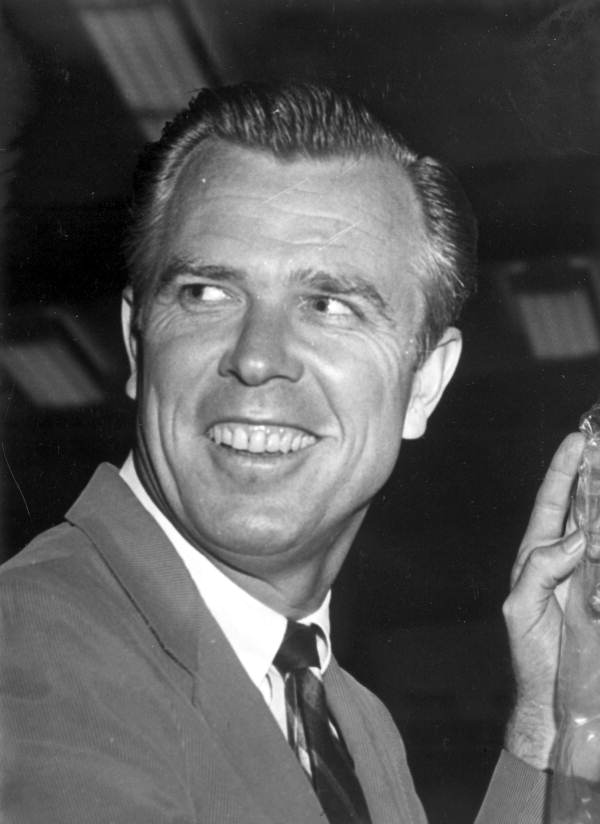
- Eldredge in 1961

Member of the Florida House of Representatives from Dade County
- In office 1959–1963

Personal details
- Born: August 6, 1921 Miami, Florida, U.S.
- Died: January 1, 1984 (aged 62)
- Party: Democratic
- Education: Georgia School of Technology; University of Miami

David C. Eldredge (August 6, 1921 – January 1, 1984) was an American politician. He served as a Democratic member of the Florida House of Representatives.

== Life and career ==
Eldredge was born in Miami, Florida. He attended Georgia School of Technology and the University of Miami.

Eldredge served in the Florida House of Representatives from 1959 to 1963.

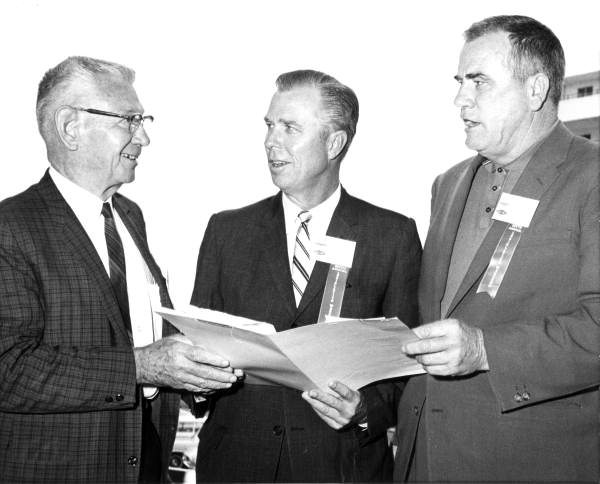
Eldredge (center) with S. Chesterfield Smith and Luther C. Tucker, 1964

Eldredge died on January 1, 1984, at the age of 62.
