= Ahmad Yunus Mokoginta =

Indonesian military officer

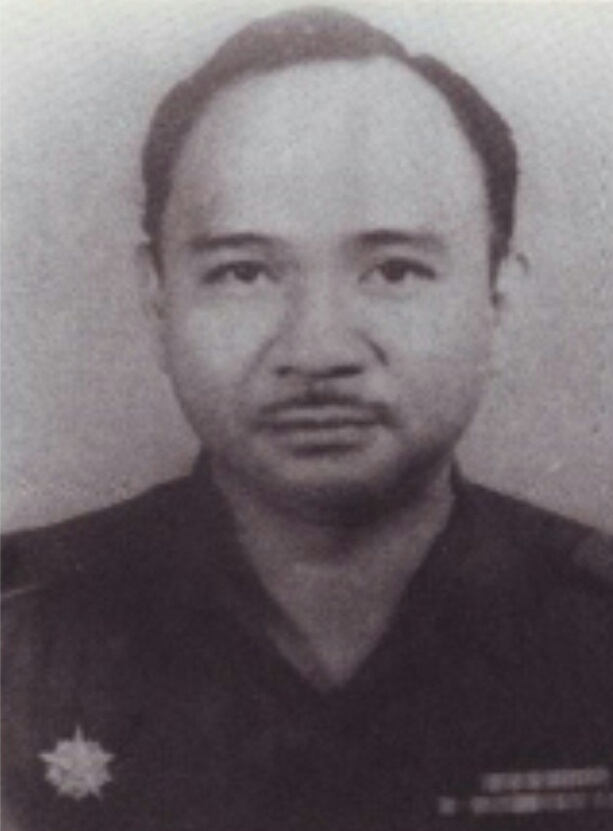

Commander of the Indonesian Army Command and Staff College
- In office 12 March 1956 – 16 April 1958
- Preceded by: GPH Djatikoesoemo
- Succeeded by: Latief Hendraningrat
- In office 1 October 1951 – 8 April 1953
- Preceded by: office established
- Succeeded by: GPH Djatikoesoemo

Regional Commander of Kodam VII/Wirabuana
- In office 1950–1950
- Preceded by: Office established
- Succeeded by: Alexander Evert Kawilarang

Java Regional Military Police Commander
- In office 1949–1950
- Preceded by: Gatot Soebroto
- Succeeded by: Siswondo Parman

Personal details
- Born: April 28, 1921 Kotamobagu, North Sulawesi
- Died: January 11, 1984 (aged 62) Jakarta
- Spouse: Koriyati Mokoginta
- Children: 9
- Education: Koninklijke Militaire Academie (1941)
- Nickname: A. Y. Mokoginta

Military service
- Allegiance: Indonesia
- Branch/service: Indonesian Army
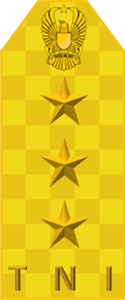
- Rank: Lieutenant General TNI
- Unit: Military Police Corps

Lt. Gen. Ahmad Yunus Mokoginta, commonly known as A. Y. Mokoginta (28 April 1921 – 11 January 1984), was an Indonesian military officer and a signatory to the Petition of 50, coming from an aristocratic family in Bolaang Mongondow.

== Early life ==
Born in Kotamobagu, North Sulawesi on April 28, 1921, Mokoginta was the son of Abraham Patra Mokoginta, a former jogogu (prime minister) of the Bolaang Mongondow Kingdom. Moving to Java with his father, he studied at an Algemene Middelbare School in Semarang.

== Military career ==
In 1941, he entered the Koninklijke Militaire Academie in Bandung, relocated after the German occupation of the Netherlands. During the Japanese occupation and after the Proclamation of Indonesian independence, he was involved in youth movements. He was staff officer in Brigade III of the Siliwangi Division and served as an aide to General Oerip Soemohardjo. He served as Commander of the Java Regional Military Police, replacing Gatot Soebroto from 1948 to 1950.

In 1949, after the transfer of power from the Netherlands to the Republic of Indonesia, Mokoginta was elected as the officer in charge of the Military Territorial Region in East Indonesia. He was appointed to lead Territory VII which was headquartered in Makassar with the rank of Lieutenant Colonel. On 5 April 1950 he was captured by forces led by Captain Andi Aziz during the Makassar Uprising. In August 1950 Territory VII was changed to Kodam VII/Wirabuana and Lt. Col. A. Y. Mokoginta was replaced by commander Alexander Evert Kawilarang.

He was the first SSKAD Commander from 1951 to 1953 and team leader of the Army Doctrine Committee, formulating the TNI's ideology in order to deal with infiltration from foreign powers and interference from within the country. Together with Colonel Soewarto, they prepared SESKOAD as an institution that produced modern Indonesian officers. He was also the Head of the Education Curriculum Formulating Team at the Indonesian Military Academy at Magelang.

He was in Medan, North Sumatra, during the 30th September Movement and with Brigadier General Ishak Djuarsa, Commander of Kodam I/Iskandar Muda, Brigadier General Darjatmo and Brigadier General Sobirin, Commander of Kodam II/Bukit Barisan and Brigadier General Makmun Murod, Commander of Kodam Sriwijaya, in purging communist, participated in the Anti-Communist purges in Sumatra, supporting the anti-Communist paramilitary group, Pemuda Pancasila in purging communist.

Retiring from the Armed Forces, he became Indonesian ambassador to Sudan and Morocco, from 1967 to 1970 and signed the petition of 50, criticizing the New Order government of Suharto.

His health began to deteriorate in 1982 and died in 1984, being buried in the Kalibata Heroes' Cemetery.
