= Charles Daily =

English cricketer

Charles Edwin Daily (28 April 1900 – 30 June 1974) was an English first-class cricketer active 1923–1929 who played for Surrey. He was born and died in Ockley.
