= First ladies and gentlemen of Mauritius =

Spouse of the president of Mauritius

First Lady of Mauritius
- Coat of arms of Mauritius
- Incumbent; Mrs. Brinda Gokhool since 6 December 2024
- Residence: State House
- Inaugural holder: Lady Ringadoo
- Formation: 12 March 1992
- Salary: None

First Lady (French: Première dame) or First Gentleman of Mauritius is a term used by the media for the spouse of the sitting president of Mauritius.

== Role of the first lady/gentlemen ==
The spouse does not have any official duties or salary, but tend to participate in humanitarian and charitable work.

== First ladies/gentlemen of Mauritius ==
No.	Name	Portrait	Took office	Left office	President of Mauritius
1.	Lady Ringadoo		12 March 1992	30 June 1992	Sir Veerasamy Ringadoo
2.	Zohra Uteem		30 June 1992	15 February 2002	Cassam Uteem
3.	Marie Offmann		25 February 2002	7 October 2003	Karl Offmann
4.	Lady Sarojini Jugnauth		7 October 2003	31 March 2012	Sir Anerood Jugnauth
5.	Aneetah Purryag		21 July 2012	29 May 2015	Kailash Purryag
6.	Anwar Fakim		5 June 2015	23 March 2018	Ameenah Gurib-Fakim
7.	Sayukta Roopun		2 December 2019	2 December 2024	Prithvirajsing Roopun
8.	Brinda Gokhool		6 December 2024	Present	Dharam Gokhool

== See also ==
- President of Mauritius
- List of presidents of Mauritius
- Spouse of the prime minister of Mauritius
