= Alice Mendham Powell =

American educator (1903 – 1984)

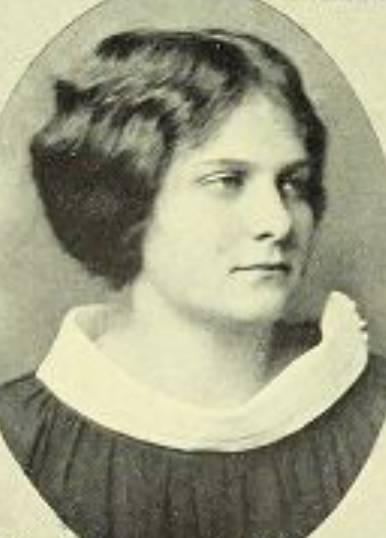
- Alice Mendham Powell, from the 1925 yearbook of Barnard College
- Born: Alice Coe Mendham; August 14, 1903; New York City
- Died: January 5, 1984 (age 80); Hampton, Virginia
- Occupations: Educator, school founder

Alice Coe Mendham Powell (August 14, 1903 – January 5, 1984) was an American progressive educator, college professor, and school founder. She advocated for federal early childhood education programs, and for universal kindergarten.

== Early life and education ==
Alice Coe Mendham was born in New York City, the daughter of Louis Philippe Mendham and Alice Hudson Coe. Her mother died in 1907, and her father, a stockbroker, died in 1923. She graduated from Barnard College in 1925, with further studies at the Sorbonne, the University of Minnesota, and the University of Chicago. She completed doctoral studies at the University of Maryland in 1958, with a dissertation titled "Racial awareness and social behavior in an interracial four-year-old group."

== Career ==
Powell worked at the Little Red School House and the Bank Street School as a young woman. She founded the Green Acres School in Bethesda, Maryland in 1934, and was the school's director until 1939. She taught at the Kindergarten Teacher Training College in Brisbane in the 1940s, while her husband's work took the Powells to Australia for a few years. From 1948 to 1952, she was associated with the Institute for Child Study at the University of Maryland. From 1954 until 1970, Powell was head of the early childhood education program at Hampton Institute. She launched the early childhood education department at Old Dominion University in 1970, and retired from academic work in 1972.

In 1978 Powell gave an oral history interview to doctoral student Edith Lisolette Gordon, which is now in the collection of the Bank Street College of Education Archives. She advocated for federal early childhood education programs and universal kindergarten, and spoke at conferences about early childhood policy. She was co-founder of the Washington, D.C. chapter of the Progressive Education Association. She served two terms as president of the Virginia Association for Early Childhood Education, and was president of the Tidewater Association for Early Childhood Education.

== Personal life and legacy ==
Mendham married professor and diplomat Webster Clay Powell; they had two daughters, Nina and Gail. Her husband died in 1967, and she died in 1984, at the age of 80, at a hospital in Hampton, Virginia. The Green Acres School gives an annual Alice Mendham Powell Award to an alumnus who "demonstrated independent thought and made outstanding professional, philanthropic, or volunteer accomplishments".
