= Vladimir Borsoev =

Red Army officer

- Владимир Бузинаевич Борсоев
- Born: April 13, 1906; Holbot, Irkutsk Governorate, Russian Empire
- Died: March 8, 1945 (age 38); Poland
- Military career
- Allegiance: Soviet Union
- Branch: Soviet Army
- Service years: 1941–1945
- Rank: Colonel
- Units: 1st Ukrainian Front, Soviet Army, USSR
- Awards: Hero of the Soviet Union

Vladimir Borsoev was the commander of the 7th Guards anti-tank artillery brigade in the Second World War for which he was posthumously awarded the title Hero of the Soviet Union.

== Early life ==
Borsoev was born April 13, 1906, in Holbot, Irkutsk in the Russian Empire. He was an ethnic Buryat.

In 1932 he entered the Leningrad Artillery School and in 1941 he graduated from M.V. Frunze Military Academy.

== World War II ==
Borsoev was sent to the Eastern Front of World War II in June 1941. He participated in the Battle of Kursk and offensive campaigns in Ukraine and Poland. On March 8, 1945, Guard Colonel Vladimir Borsoev in battles on the Oder bridgehead was seriously wounded and died of his wounds. He was buried in Lviv, Ukraine.

On 6 May 1965 Guard Colonel Vladimir Borsoev was posthumously awarded the title Hero of the Soviet Union "for courage and heroism in the battles against the Nazi invaders" by Decree of the Presidium of the Supreme Soviet.

== Honours and awards ==
- Hero of the Soviet Union (1965)
- Order of Lenin (1944)
- Order of Lenin (1965)
- Order of the Patriotic War (1945)
- Order of the Red Star (1941)

== Memory ==
- One of the streets in the city of Ulan-Ude is named in his honor.
