= List of Heroes of the Soviet Union (P) =

The title Hero of the Soviet Union was the highest distinction of the Soviet Union. It was awarded 12,775 times. Due to the large size of the list, it has been broken up into multiple pages.

- Ivan Pavkin ru
- Iosif Pavlenko ru
- Nikolai Pavlenko ru
- Dmitry Pavlikov ru
- Aleksandr Pavlichenko ru
- Lyudmila Pavlichenko
- Aleksandr Georgievich Pavlov ru
- Aleksandr Ivanovich Pavlov ru
- Aleksey Dmitrievich Pavlov ru
- Aleksey Nikolaevich Pavlov ru
- Anatoly Pavlov ru
- Anton Pavlov ru
- Boris Pavlov ru
- Valentin Pavlov ru
- Vasily Aleksandrovich Pavlov ru
- Vasily Vasilyevich Pavlov ru
- Vasily Georgievich Pavlov ru
- Vasily Mikhailovich Pavlov ru
- Vasily Fyodorovich Pavlov ru
- Vitaly Pavlov ru
- Vladimir Vladimirovich Pavlov ru
- Vladimir Grigorievich Pavlov ru
- Vladimir Fyodorovich Pavlov ru
- Georgy Vasilyevich Pavlov ru
- Georgy Petrovich Pavlov ru
- Grigory Pavlov ru
- Dmitry Grigorevich Pavlov
- Dmitry Ivanovich Pavlov ru
- Yefim Pavlov ru
- Ivan Dmitrievich Pavlov ru
- Ivan Mikhailovich Pavlov ru
- Ivan Fomich Pavlov (twice)
- Konstantin Pavlov ru
- Lavr Pavlov ru
- Mikhail Nikitovich Pavlov (colonel) ru
- Mikhail Nikitovich Pavlov (aviator) ru
- Nikifor Mikhailovich Pavlov ru
- Nikifor Savelevich Pavlov ru
- Nikolai Dmitrievich Pavlov ru
- Nikolai Nikitovich Pavlov ru
- Nikolai Pavlovich Pavlov ru
- Nikolai Spiridonovich Pavlov ru
- Pavel Ivanovich Pavlov ru
- Pavel Ilyich Pavlov ru
- Pavel Prokopevich Pavlov ru
- Pyotr Yegorovich Pavlov ru
- Pyotr Pavlovich Pavlov ru
- Pyotr Trofimovich Pavlov ru
- Sergey Pavlov ru
- Timofey Pavlov ru
- Fyodor Pavlov ru
- Yuri Pavlov ru
- Yakov Pavlov
- Ivan Pavlovich ru
- Aleksey Pavlovsky ru
- Anatoly Pavlovsky ru
- Ivan Pavlovsky
- Ilya Pavlovsky ru
- Rafail Pavlovsky ru
- Fyodor Illarionovich Pavlovsky ru
- Fyodor Kirillovich Pavlovsky ru
- Mikhail Pavlotsky ru
- Nikolai Pavlushkin ru
- Arkady Pavlushko ru
- Valentin Pavlyuk ru
- Konstantin Pavlyukov ru
- Ivan Pavlyuchenko ru
- Ignat Pavlyuchenkov ru
- Boris Padalko ru
- Yakov Paderin ru
- Yuri Padorin ru
- Leonid Padukov ru
- Yevsigny Paygusov ru
- Aleksandr Paykov ru
- Sergey Pavalin ru
- Vladimir Palagin ru
- Georgy Palamarchuk ru
- Aleksandr Palansky ru
- Anton Paliev ru
- Fyodor Paly ru
- Ivan Palilov ru
- Sergey Palchikov ru
- Anton Panarin ru
- Mikhail Panarin ru
- Vladimir Panasyuk ru
- Igor Panganis ru
- Pyotr Panezhda ru
- Aleksey Panzhensky ru
- Mikhail Panikakha
- Boris Panin ru
- Ivan Panin ru
- Pavel Panin ru
- Andrey Panikhidnikov ru
- Mikhail Panichkin ru
- Nikolai Panichkin ru
- Aleksey Pankov ru
- Boris Pankov ru
- Vasily Pankov ru
- Ilya Pankov ru
- Mikhail Pankov ru
- Aleksandr Pankratov ru
- Vasily Pankratov ru
- Georgy Pankratov ru
- Sergey Pankratov ru
- Aleksandr Panov ru
- Aleksey Panov ru
- Anatoly Panov ru
- Vasily Panov ru
- Dmitry Panov ru
- Mikhail Panov
- Nikolai Panov ru
- Pavel Panov ru
- Pyotr Panov ru
- Stepan Panov ru
- Gavriil Panteleev ru
- Lev Panteleev ru
- Anatoly Pantelkin ru
- Aleksey Georgievich Panfilov ru
- Aleksey Pavlovich Panfilov ru
- Vasily Panfilov ru
- Dmitry Panfilov ru
- Ivan Panfilov
- Mikhail Panfilov ru
- Nikandr Panfilov ru
- Aleksey Panchenko ru
- Boris Panchenko ru
- Grigory Panchenko ru
- Dmitry Panchenko ru
- Ivan Panchenko ru
- Konstantin Panchenko ru
- Mikhail Panchenko ru
- Trofim Pancheshny ru
- Vasily Panchikov ru
- Ivan Pankov ru
- Ivan Papanin (twice)
- Arnold Papel ru
- Lazar Papernik ru
- Nikolai Papivin ru
- Vladimir Papidze ru
- Pavel Papin
- Georgy Papuashvili ru
- Semyon Papulov ru
- Ivan Papyshev ru
- Aleksandr Paradovich ru
- Ivan Paramonov ru
- Konstantin Paramonov ru
- Pavel Paramonov ru
- Yefim Parakhin ru
- Vladimir Parakhnevich ru
- Feodosy Parashchenko ru
- Dmitry Parovatkin ru
- Mikhail Parsegov
- Afanasy Parfyonov ru
- Viktor Parfyonov ru
- Zoya Parfyonova
- Pavel Parfilov ru
- Nikifor Parkhomenko ru
- Nikolai Parkhomenko ru
- Yefim Parkhomchuk ru
- Viktor Parshin ru
- Georgy Parshin (twice)
- Ivan Parshin ru
- Mikhail Parshin ru
- Nikolai Parshin ru
- Fyodor Parshin ru
- Yuri Parshin ru
- Timofey Parshutkin ru
- Ivan Parygin ru
- Artyom Pasechnik ru
- Nikolai Pasov ru
- Aleksandr Passar ru
- Yuri Pastorov ru
- Gennady Pastukhov ru
- Dmitry Pastukhov ru
- Pyotr Pastyryov ru
- Grigory Pasynkov ru
- Ivan Pasynok ru
- Aleksey Pasko
- Yevdokiya Pasko
- Nikolai Pasko
- Aleksandr Patrakov ru
- Aleksey Patrin ru
- Ivan Patrushev ru
- Fyodor Pakhalchuk ru
- Nikolai Pakhanov ru
- Ivan Pakholyuk ru
- Aleksey Pakhomov ru
- Grigory Pakhomov ru
- Dmitry Pakhomov ru
- Pyotr Pakhomov ru
- Nikolai Pakhotishchev ru
- Viktor Patsayev
- Valentin Patsyuchenko ru
- Pyotr Pashin ru
- Valentin Pashirov ru
- Aleksey Pashkevich ru
- Stepan Pashkevich ru
- Aleksandr Pashkov ru
- Aleksey Pashkov ru
- Andrey Pashkov ru
- Ivan Pashkov ru
- Anisim Pashchenko ru
- Ivan Pashchenko ru
- Grigory Pevnev ru
- Viktor Pevunov ru
- Grigory Pegov ru
- Vasily Pedko ru
- Naum Peysakhovsky ru
- Aleksandr Pelevin ru
- Vladimir Pelipenko ru
- Zinovy Penaki ru
- Ivan Penkov ru
- Mikhail Penkov ru
- Ivan Penya ru
- Dmitry Penyazkov ru
- Yevgeny Pepelyaev
- Nikolai Pepelyaev ru
- Aleksey Pervukhin ru
- Aleksandr Pervushin ru
- Semyon Perevyortkin ru
- Yefrem Perevertnyuk ru
- Andrey Perevoznikov ru
- Mikhail Perevozny ru
- Nikolai Perevozchenko ru
- Pyotr Pereguda ru
- Aleksandr Peregudov ru
- Aleksey Peregudov ru
- Iosif Peredery ru
- Stepan Perekalsky ru
- Grigory Perekrestov ru
- Aleksey Perelet
- Aleksandr Perepelitsa ru
- Polikarp Perepelitsa ru
- Mikhail Perepechin ru
- Pyotr Perepechin ru
- Pyotr Peresumkin ru
- Fyodor Peresypkin ru
- Vasily Peretrukhin ru
- Ivan Perekhoda ru
- Alif Piriyev
- Yerofey Perminov ru
- Ivan Perminov ru
- Veniamin Permyakov ru
- Vladimir Permyakov ru
- Dmitry Perov ru
- Ivan Perov
- Anatoly Perfilev ru
- Nikolai Perfilev ru
- Franz Perkhorovich
- Fyodor Pershikov ru
- Boris Pershin ru
- Konstantin Pershin ru
- Ivan Pershuov ru
- Dmitry IvanovichPeskov ru
- Dmitry Mikhailovich Peskov ru
- Ivan Peskov ru
- Konstantin Peskov ru
- Pavel Peskov ru
- Aleksey Pesterev ru
- Georgy Pesterev ru
- Boris Pestrov ru
- Vasily Pestryakov ru
- Aleksandr Petelin ru
- Yuri Petelin ru
- Georgy Peters ru
- Pavel Petikin ru
- Maksim Petin ru
- Iosif Petlyuk ru
- Ivan Ilyich Petrakov ru
- Ivan Fyodorovich Petrakov ru
- Anatoly Petrakovsky
- Pavel Petrakov ru
- Ivan Petrashev ru
- Valentin Petrashov ru
- Vasily Vasilyevich Petrenko ru
- Vasily Gavrilovich Petrenko ru
- Vasily Yakovlevich Petrenko ru
- Gennady Petrenko ru
- Grigory Petrenko ru
- Dmitry Petrenko ru
- Yevgeny Petrenko ru
- Ivan Petrenko ru
- Nikolai Petrenko ru
- Stepan Petrenko ru
- Afanasy Petrik ru
- Andrey Petrikov ru
- Andrey Petrichenko ru
- Ivan Petrichenko ru
- Vasily Petrishchev ru
- Sergey Petrishchev ru
- Aleksandr Ivanovich Petrov ru
- Aleksandr Pavlovich Petrov ru
- Aleksandr Fyodorovich Petrov (corporal) ru
- Aleksandr Fyodorovich Petrov (lieutenant) ru
- Aleksey Vasilyevich Petrov ru
- Aleksey Ivanovich Petrov (colonel) ru
- Aleksey Ivanovich Petrov (soldier) ru
- Anton Vasilyevich Petrov ru
- Anton Ilyich Petrov ru
- Anton Petrovich Petrov ru
- Vadim Petrov ru
- Vasily Vasilyevich Petrov ru
- Vasily Vasilyevich Petrov ru
- Vasily Ivanovich Petrov
- Vasily Stepanovich Petrov (twice)
- Vasily Yakovlevich Petrov ru
- Viktor Petrov ru
- Vladimir Aleksandrovich Petrov ru
- Vladimir Yakovlevich Petrov ru
- Vyacheslav Petrov ru
- Georgy Georgievoch Petrov ru
- Georgy Ivanovich Petrov ru
- Grigory Petrovich Petrov ru
- Dmitry Petrov ru
- Yevgeny Petrov ru
- Ivan Vasilyevich Petrov ru
- Ivan Yefimovich Petrov
- Ivan Ivanovich Petrov ru
- Ivan Petrovich Petrov ru
- Ivan Timofeevich Petrov ru
- Igor Petrov ru
- Mikhail Zakharovich Petrov ru
- Mikhail Ivanovich Petrov ru
- Mikhail Illarionovich Petrov ru
- Mikhail Petrovich Petrov (general)
- Mikhail Petrovich Petrov (colonel)
- Mikhail Timofeevich Petrov ru
- Nikolai Andreevich Petrov ru
- Nikolai Ivanovich Petrov ru
- Nikolai Semyonovich Petrov ru
- Nikolai Stepanovich Petrov ru
- Pavel Gavrilovich Petrov ru
- Pyotr Mikhailovich Petrov
- Roman Petrov ru
- Semyon Petrov ru
- Antonina Petrova
- Galina Petrova
- Georgy Petrovsky ru
- Konstantin Maksimovich Petrovsky ru
- Konstantin Ostapovich Petrovsky ru
- Aleksey Petropavlov ru
- Suren Petrosyan ru
- Vasily Petrochenko ru
- Yevdokim Petrunin ru
- Nikolai Petrukhin ru
- Vasily Petrushevich ru
- Aleksandr Petrushevsky ru
- Ivan Petrushin ru
- Vasily Petryuk ru
- Aleksandr Petryaev ru
- Aleksey Petukhov ru
- Ivan Petukhov ru
- Ignaty Petukhov ru
- Nikolai Dmitrievich Petukhov ru
- Nikolai Yevgenevich Petukhov ru
- Adam Petushkov ru
- Aleksey Petushkov ru
- Iosif Petchenko ru
- Sergey Petyalin ru
- Yefim Pechyonkin ru
- Nikolai Pechyony ru
- Vasily Pechenyuk ru
- Nikita Pechenyuk ru
- Fyodor Pechenyuk ru
- Aleksandr Pecheritsa ru
- Mikhail Pechersky ru
- Georgy Pechkovsky ru
- Aleksandr Peshakov ru
- Vasily Peshekhonov ru
- Aleksandr Ivanovich Peshkov ru
- Vladimir Peshkov ru
- Andrey Peshchenko ru
- Pyotr Piven ru
- Nikolai Pivnyuk ru
- Viktor Pivovar ru
- Mikhail Yevdokimovich Pivovarov ru
- Mikhail Ivanovich Pivovarov ru
- Sergey Pivovarov ru
- Vladimir Pivchenkov ru
- Nikolai Pigida ru
- Ivan Pigin ru
- Nikolai Pigorev ru
- Nikolai Pidzhakov ru
- Ivan Pidtykan ru
- Aleksandr Pikalov ru
- Vladimir Pikalov
- Konstantin Pikachyov ru
- Ivan Pikin ru
- Aleksandr Pikunov ru
- Valentin Pilipas ru
- Vladimir Pilipenko ru
- Ivan Pilipenko ru
- Mikhail Vasilyevich Pilipenko ru
- Mikhail Korneevich Pilipenko ru
- Yakov Pilipenko ru
- Dmitry Pilipchenko ru
- Aleksandr Pilnikov ru
- Pyotr Andreevich Pilyutov
- Vasily Vasilyevich Pimenov ru
- Vasily Markelovich Pimenov ru
- Ivan Ivanovich Pimenov ru
- Ivan Timofeevich Pimenov ru
- Matvey Pinsky ru
- Andrey Pinchuk ru
- Grigory Pinchuk ru
- Nikolai Pinchuk
- Timofey Pinchuk ru
- Georgy Pinyaev ru
- Aleksey Pirmisashvili ru
- Vladimir Pirogov ru
- Ivan Pirogov ru
- Timofey Pirogov ru
- Aleksandr Pirogovsky ru
- Stepan Pirozhenko ru
- Boris Pirozhkov ru
- Andrey Piryazev ru
- Andrey Pisarev ru
- Gennady Pisarev ru
- Georgy Pisarev ru
- Nikolai Pisarevsky ru
- Andrey Pisarenko ru
- Nikolai Pisarenko ru
- Pavel Pisarenko ru
- Ivan Piskaryov ru
- Vasily Yemelyanovich Pisklov ru
- Vasily Kirillovich Pisklov ru
- Ivan Piskun ru
- Boris Piskunov ru
- Vasily Piskunov ru
- Mikhail Piskunov ru
- Viktor Pislegin ru
- Vladimir Pismenny ru
- Vyacheslav Pismenny ru
- Ivan Pismenny ru
- Georgy Pitersky ru
- Dmitry Pichugin ru
- Yevgeny Pichugin ru
- Ivan Pichugin ru
- Mikhail Pichugin ru
- Vasily Pichugov ru
- Ivan Pishkan ru
- Boris Pishchikevich ru
- Andrian Pishchulin ru
- Ivan Piyavchik ru
- Dmitry Plakidin ru
- Mikhail Plaksa ru
- Vladimir Platitsin ru
- Aleksey Platov ru
- Mikhail Platov ru
- Venedikt Platonov ru
- Georgy Platonov ru
- Konstantin Platonov ru
- Nikolai Yevgenevich Platonov ru
- Nikolai Yevtikhievich Platonov ru
- Nikolai Lavrentevich Platonov ru
- Aleksey Plakhotnik ru
- Daniil Plakhotnik ru
- Nikolai Plakhotny ru
- Savely Plakhotya ru
- Boris Plashkin ru
- Vasily Plesinov ru
- Pavel Pletenskoy ru
- Pyotr Pletnyov ru
- Andrey Plekhanov ru
- Ivan Plekhanov ru
- Nikolai Plekhanov ru
- Aleksandr Pleshakov ru
- Aleksey Pleshakov ru
- Ivan Pleshev ru
- Ivan Pleshivtsev ru
- Ivan Pleshkov ru
- Pyotr Pleshkov ru
- Issa Pliyev
- Ivan Plis ru
- Igor Ploskonos ru
- Mikhail Nikolayevich Plotkin ru
- Aleksandr Plotnikov ru
- Dmitry Plotnikov ru
- Pavel Artemyevich Plotnikov (twice)
- Pavel Mikhailovich Plotnikov ru
- Fyodor Plotnikov ru
- Pyotr Plotyansky ru
- Ivan Plokhikh ru
- Aleksey Plokhov ru
- Vasily Plokhoy ru
- Mikhail Plugaryov ru
- Aleksey Plugatar ru
- Timofey Pluzhnikov ru
- Artyom Plysenko ru
- Nikolai Plysyuk ru
- Nikolai Plyusnin ru
- Aleksandr Plyushch ru
- Sergey Plyushchenko ru
- Aleksandr Plyakin ru
- Ivan Plyakin ru
- Yakov Plyashechnik ru
- Aleksandr Poverenny ru
- Pyotr Povetkin ru
- Ivan Povoroznyuk ru
- Stepan Pogodaev ru
- Dmitry Pogodin
- Nikolai Pogodin ru
- Vasily Pogorelov ru
- Vasily Pogorelov ru
- Ivan Pogorelov ru
- Mikhail Pogorelov ru
- Semyon Pogorelov ru
- Aleksandr Pogoreltsev ru
- Aramais Pogosyan ru
- Daniil Pogpebnoy ru
- Pavel Poda ru
- Yegor Podanev ru
- Stepan Podgaynov ru
- Vladimir Podgorbunsky ru
- Leonid Podgorbunsky ru
- Timofey Podgorny ru
- Aleksandr Poddavashkin ru
- Aleksey Poddubny ru
- Nikolai Poddubny ru
- Vladimir Podzigun ru
- Viktor Podkolodnov ru
- Stepan Podkopaev ru
- Ivan Podkopay ru
- Sergey Podluzsky ru
- Stepan Podnavozny ru
- Valentin Podnevich ru
- Ivan Podoltsev ru
- Nikolai Podorozhny ru
- Nikolai Podsadnik ru
- Aleksandr Podchufarov ru
- Mikhail Podshibyakin ru
- Matevy Podymakhin ru
- Ivan Pozharsky
- Nikolai Pozharsky ru
- Pyotr Pozdeev ru
- Aleksey Pavlovich Pozdnyakov ru
- Aleksey Petrovich Pozdnyakov ru
- Konstantin Posdnyakov ru
- Sergey Pozdnyakov ru
- Fyodor Pozdnyakov ru
- Nikolai Pozevalkin ru
- Viktor Poznyak ru
- Aleksandr Poznyakov ru
- Timofey Pozolotin ru
- Mikhail Pokalo ru
- Ivan Pokalchuk ru
- Ivan Pokatilov ru
- Nikolai Pokachalov ru
- Vasily Pokidko ru
- Aleksandr Poklikushkin ru
- Vasily Pokolodny ru
- Dmitry Pokramovich ru
- Vladimir Pokrovsky ru
- Georgy Pokrovsky ru
- Nikolai Pokrovsky ru
- Pyotr Pokryshev (twice)
- Aleksandr Pokryshkin (thrice)
- Nikolai Polagushin ru
- Ivan Polbin (twice)
- Ivan Polevoy ru
- Pavel Polevoy ru
- Nikolai Polezhaev ru
- Semyon Polezhaev ru
- Sergey Poleshaykin ru
- Fyodor Poletaev ru
- Sergey Poletsky ru
- Nikolai Poleshchikov ru
- Vasily Poleshchuk ru
- Mariya Polivanova
- Gerasin Polikanov ru
- Ilya Polikakhin ru
- Aleksandr Polin ru
- Aleksey Polin ru
- Viktor Polinsky ru
- Semyon Politov ru
- Ivan Ivanovich Polishchuk ru
- Ivan Mikhailovich Polishchuk ru
- Iosif Polishchuk ru
- Spiridon Polishchuk ru
- Pavel Polkovnikov ru
- Ivan Polovets ru
- Aleksandr Polovinkin ru
- Valentin Polovinkin ru
- Vasily Polovinkin ru
- Polikarp Polovinko ru
- Gavriil Polovchenya ru
- Pavel Pologov ru
- Ivan Polozkov ru
- Konstantin Polozov ru
- Yuri Polony ru
- Yevgeny Polonsky ru
- Aleksey Polosin
- Yevgeny Poltavky ru
- Pavel Poluboyarov ru
- Nikolai Polukarov ru
- Aleksandr Polunin ru
- Ivan Polunin ru
- Valery Polunovsky ru
- Vladimir Polupanov ru
- Ivan Polukhin ru
- Pyotr Polushkin ru
- Georgy Poluektov ru
- Stepan Poluektov ru
- Grigory Poluyanov ru
- Vasily Polygalov ru
- Pavel Polygalov ru
- Fyodor Polynin
- Dmitry Polynkin ru
- Natan Polyusuk ru
- Valery Polyakov
- Vasily Vasilyevich Polyakov ru
- Vasily Georgievich Polyakov ru
- Vasily Trofimovich Polyakov ru
- Vitaly Polyakov ru
- Vladimir Polyakov ru
- Ivan Vasilyevich Polyakov ru
- Ivan Kuzmich Polyakov ru
- Ivan Matveevich Polyakov ru
- Konstantin Polyakov ru
- Leonid Polyakov ru
- Mikhail Pavlovich Polyakov ru
- Nikolai Polyakov ru
- Pavel Polyakov ru
- Sergey Polyakov ru
- Ivan Polyanichkin ru
- Aleksandr Polyansky ru
- Nikolai Polyansky ru
- Pyotr Polyansky ru
- Stepan Polyansky
- Aleksandr Pomazunov
- Vasily Pomeshchik ru
- Dmitry Pomukchinsky ru
- Semyon Ponmarchuk ru
- Aleksey Ponomaryov ru
- Vasily Ponomaryov ru
- Viktor Ponomaryov ru
- Georgy Ponomaryov ru
- Dmitry Ponomaryov ru
- Ivan Ponomaryov ru
- Mikhail Petrovich Ponomaryov ru
- Mikhail Sergeevich Ponomaryov
- Nikolai Ponomaryov ru
- Pavel Yelizarovich Ponomaryov ru
- Pavel Ivanovich Ponomaryov ru
- Pavel Sergeevich Ponomaryov ru
- Pyotr Ponomaryov ru
- Sergey Alekseevich Ponomaryov ru
- Sergey Dmitrievich Ponomaryov ru
- Aleksey Ponomarenko ru
- Arkady Ponomarenko ru
- Viktor Ponomarenko ru
- Ivan Ponomarenko ru
- Ilya Ponomarenko ru
- Leonid Ponomarenko ru
- Pavel Ponomarenko ru
- Andrey Ponomarchuk ru
- Lavrenty Ponomarchuk ru
- Steoan Ponomarchuk ru
- Aleksandr Popkov ru
- Boris Popkov ru
- Valery Popkov ru
- Vasily Popkov ru
- Vitaly Popkov (twice)
- Fyodor Popkov ru
- Stanislav Poplavsky
- Aleksandr Vasilyevich Popov ru
- Aleksandr Grigorievich Popov ru
- Aleksandr Sergeevich Popov ru
- Aleksandr Fyodorovich Popov ru
- Aleksey Popov ru
- Anatoly Arkhipovich Popov ru
- Anatoly Fyodorovich Popov ru
- Andrey Andreevich Popov ru
- Andrey Ivanovich Popov ru
- Andrey Kirillovich Popov ru
- Andrey Fyodorovich Popov ru
- Boris Popov ru
- Vasily Andreevich Popov ru
- Vasily Ivanovich Popov ru
- Vasily Lazarevich Popov ru
- Vasily Stepanovich Popov
- Gennady Popov ru
- Georgy Vasilyevich Popov ru
- Georgy Yevdokimovich Popov ru
- Georgy Timofeevich Popov ru
- Dmitry Popov ru
- Ivan Anisimovich Popov ru
- Ivan Mikhailovich Popov ru
- Ivan Petrovich Popov ru
- Ivan Stepanovich Popov ru
- Konstantin Popov ru
- Leonid Ivanovich Popov (twice)
- Leonid Ilyich Popov ru
- Markian Popov
- Mikhail Nikolaevich Popov ru
- Mikhail Romanovich Popov ru
- Nikolai Antonovich Popov ru
- Nikolai Zakharovich Popov ru
- Nikolai Ivanovich Popov ru
- Nikolai Ilyich Popov ru
- Nikolai Isaakovich Popov ru
- Nikolai Mikhailovich Popov ru
- Nikolai Fyodorovich Popov ru
- Pavel Popov ru
- Pyotr Georgievich Popov ru
- Pyotr Dmitrievich Popov ru
- Semyon Popov ru
- Stepan Popov ru
- Fyodor Grigorievich Popov ru
- Fyodor Kuzmich Popov ru
- Nadezhda Popova
- Vladimir Popovich ru
- Grigory Popovich ru
- Pavel Popovich (twice)
- Pavel Popravka ru
- Aleksandr Popryadukhin ru
- Aleksey Popugaev ru
- Nikolai Popudrenko ru
- Ivan Porechenkov ru
- Vasyl Poryk ru
- Pavel Porosenkov ru
- Zinaida Portnova
- Sergey Portnyagin ru
- Andrey Portyanko ru
- Ivan Posadsky ru
- Pavel Posvit ru
- Aleksandr Poskonkin ru
- Ivan Poskryobyshev ru
- Nikolai Posokhin ru
- Grigory Posokhov ru
- Pavel Pospelov ru
- Sergey Postevoy ru
- Aleksey Postnov ru
- Aleksey Postny ru
- Nikolai Potapenko ru
- Filipp Potapenko ru
- Aleksandr Zakharovich Potapov ru
- Aleksandr Semyonovich Potapov ru
- Vasily Potapov ru
- Dmitry Kapitonovich Potapov ru
- Dmitry Mefodevich Potapov ru
- Dmitry Sergeevich Potapov ru
- Mikhail Potapov
- Pyotr Potapov ru
- Sergey Potapov ru
- Eduard Potapov ru
- Nikolai Poteev ru
- Aleksey Potyomkin ru
- Gennady Potyomkin ru
- Mikhail Potyomkin ru
- Ivan Potekhin ru
- Andrey Potopolsky ru
- Pyotr Potryasov ru
- Nikolai Potuzhny ru
- Dmitry Potylitsyn ru
- Vasily Pokhvalin ru
- Ivan Pokhlebaev ru
- Ivan Potseluev ru
- Nikolai Pochivalin ru
- Nikolai Pochtaryov ru
- Timofey Pochtaryov ru
- Pyotr Pochukalin ru
- Stepan Poshivalnikov ru
- Yakov Poshtarenko ru
- Aleksey Poyushchev ru
- Vladimir Poyarkov ru
- Vladimir Pravik
- Mikhail Prasolov ru
- Georgy Preobrazhensky ru
- Yevgeny Preobrazhensky ru
- Aleksandr Presnyakov ru
- Ivan Presnyakov ru
- Nikolai Pribylov ru
- Dmitry Privalov ru
- Ivan Privalov ru
- Aleksandr Prigara ru
- Aleksey Priglebov ru
- Aleksey Prikazchikov ru
- Pyotr Prilepa ru
- Nikolai Primak ru
- Pavel Primak ru
- Ivan Primakin ru
- Pavel Primakov ru
- Vasily Priputnev ru
- Timofey Prisekin ru
- Nikolai Prisyagin ru
- Vasily Prikhodtsev ru
- Vasily Prikhodko ru
- Gennady Prikhodk ru
- Ivan Prikhodk ru
- Nazar Prikhodk ru
- Nikolai Prikhodk ru
- Pyotr Prikhodk ru
- Sergey Prikhodk ru
- Konstantin Provalov
- Grigory Provanov ru
- Vasily Prokatov ru
- Anatoly Prokashev ru
- Vladimir Prokopenko ru
- Georgy Prokopenko ru
- Grigory Prokopenko ru
- Anatolu Prokopchik ru
- Nikolai Prokopyuk ru
- Viktor Prokofev ru
- Vladimir Prokofev ru
- Gavriil Prokofev ru
- Timofey Prokofiev
- Fyodor Prokofev ru
- Aleksey Prokudin ru
- Vasily Pronin ru
- Ivan Pronin ru
- Konstantin Pronin ru
- Mikhail Pronin
- Ivan Prosandeev ru
- Pyotr Prosvetov ru
- Mikhail Prosvirnin ru
- Mikhail Prosvirnov ru
- Yakov Proskyrin ru
- Ivan Proskurov
- Ivan Proskuryakov ru
- Ivan Prosolov ru
- Yemelyan Prosyanik ru
- Ivan Prosyanoy ru
- Vasily Protasyuk ru
- Ivan Protvin ru
- Valentin Protopopov ru
- Ivan Protopopov ru
- Viktor Protchev ru
- Nikolai Prokhorenko ru
- Aleksandr Aleksandrovich Prokhorov ru
- Aleksandr Vasilyevich Prokhorov ru
- Aleksey Prokhorov (twice)
- Vasily Ivanovich Prokhorov ru
- Vasily Nikitovich Prokhorov ru
- Yevgeny Prokhorov ru
- Zinon Prokhorov ru
- Ivan Prokhorov ru
- Mikhail Prokhorov ru
- Nikolai Prokhorov ru
- Leonid Protsenko ru
- Stepan Protsenko ru
- Nikolai Proshenkov ru
- Ivan Proshin ru
- Aleksey Proshlyakov ru
- Grigory Proshchaev ru
- Nikolai Prudky ru
- Dmitry Prudnikov ru
- Mikhail Prudnikov ru
- Fyodor Prudchenko ru
- Dumitru Prunariu
- Grigory Prutko ru
- Stepan Prutkov ru
- Vladimir Prygov ru
- Aleksandr Prygunov ru
- Daniil Prytkov ru
- Aleksandr Pryashennikov ru
- Nikolai Pryanichnikov ru
- Ivan Pryakhin ru
- Ivan Pstygo ru
- Andrey Ptitsyn ru
- Aleksandr Ptukhin ru
- Yevgeny Ptukhin
- Roland de la Poype
- Stepan Pugaev ru
- Maksim Pugach ru
- Anatoly Pugachyov ru
- Arseny Pugachyov ru
- Viktor Pugachyov
- Terenty Pygachyov ru
- Fyodor Pugachyov ru
- Pavel Pudovkin ru
- Ivan Puzanov ru
- Lev Puzanov ru
- Anatoly Puzikov ru
- Sergey Puzyryov ru
- Fyodor Puzyryov ru
- Yakov Puzyrkin ru
- Gely Pukito ru
- Trofim Pukov ru
- Grigory Pulov
- Grigory Pulkin ru
- Vasily Pulny ru
- Konstantin Pulyaevsky ru
- Pyotr Pumpur
- Vasily Pundikov ru
- Mikhail Pupkov ru
- Kuzma Purgin ru
- Nikolai Purgin ru
- Pavel Purin ru
- Fyodor Purtov ru
- Semyon Pustelnikov ru
- Aleksey Pustovalov ru
- Nikolai Pustyntsev ru
- Endel Puusepp
- Vasily Putilin ru
- Mikhail Putilin ru
- Sidor Putilov ru
- Aleksandr Putin ru
- Ivan Putintsev ru
- Nikolai Putko ru
- Nikolai Pukha ru
- Ivan Pukhov ru
- Nikolai Pukhov
- German Puchkov ru
- Mikhail Puchkov ru
- Ivan Pushanin ru
- Aleksey Pushanka ru
- Fedora Pushina
- Konstantin Pushkaryov ru
- Sergey Pushkaryov ru
- Anatoly Pushkarenko ru
- Anatoly Pushkin ru
- Yefim Pushkin ru
- Nikolai Pushkin ru
- Mikhail Pushchin ru
- Vladimir Pchelintsev
- Aleksandr Pchyolkin ru
- Gennady Pshenitsin ru
- Aleksey Pshenichko ru
- Nikolai Pshenichnikov ru
- Andrey Pshenichnykh ru
- Sergey Pshyonny ru
- Yevgeny Pylaev ru
- Konstantin Pylaev ru
- Yuri Pyrkov ru
- Vasily Pyryaev ru
- Nikolai Pysin ru
- Aleksey Pytkin ru
- Yuri Pykhin ru
- Ivan Pyanzin ru
- Aleksandr Pyankov ru
- Nikolai Pyankov ru
- Grigory Penezhko ru
- Aleksandr Pyatakovich ru
- Ivan Pyatenko ru
- Mikhail Pyatikop ru
- Georgy Pyatkin ru
- Ivan Pyatkovsky ru
- Ivan Pyatykhin ru
- Ivan Pyatyarin ru
