= Go =

Go, GO, G.O., or Go! may refer to:

== Arts and entertainment ==
=== Board games ===
- Go (game), for two players
- Travel Go (formerly Go – The International Travel Game), a game based on world travel
- Go, the starting position located at the corner of the board in the board game Monopoly

=== Video games ===
- Go, a 1992 game for the Philips CD-i video game system
- Go!, a label under which U.S. Gold published ZX Spectrum games
- Go series, a turn-based, puzzle video game series by Square Enix, based on various Square Enix franchises
- Angry Birds Go!, a kart racing game based on the Angry Birds series released in 2013
- Counter-Strike: Global Offensive (CS:GO), a first-person shooter developed by Valve
- Pokémon Go, an augmented reality game based on the Pokémon series
- Go!, Computer and Video Games's handheld console gaming magazine

=== Film ===
- Go (1999 film), American film
- Go (2001 film), a Japanese film
- Go (2007 film), a Bollywood film
- Go Karts (film), an Australian film also titled as Go!

=== Literature ===
- Go (Holmes novel), by John Clellon Holmes
- Go (Kaneshiro novel), by Kazuki Kaneshiro
- Go, a novel by Simon Lewis

=== Music ===
==== Music groups ====
- Go Records, an Australian recording company
- Go! Discs, a UK record label with a subsidiary Go! Beat Records
- Go (band), a 1970s supergroup
- The Go, a Detroit garage rock band
- Grazhdanskaya Oborona, a Soviet-Russian rock band

==== Musicians ====
- G.O (singer), a member of South Korean group MBLAQ
- Rachelle Ann Go (born 1986), Filipina singer and actress

==== Albums ====
- Go (Bedük album)
- Go! (Cartman album), and the title song
- Go (Dexter Gordon album)
- Go (Doc Walker album), and the title song
- Go! (Fair Warning album)
- Go (Girugamesh album)
- Go (Go album), by the 1970s supergroup
- Go (H2O album), and the title song (see below)
- Go (Jónsi album)
- Go (Kreva album)
- Go! (Letters to Cleo album), and the title song
- Go (Mario album), and the title song
- Go (Motion City Soundtrack album)
- Go (Newsboys album), and the title song
  - Go (Newsboys EP)
- Go (Pat Benatar album), and the title song
- Go (Paul Chambers album)
- Go (Sarah Bettens album), and the title song
- Go (Vertical Horizon album)
- Go – The Very Best of Moby, and the title song (see below)
- The Go (The Go album)
- The Go (Skunkhour album)
- Go, by Hiroshima

==== Songs ====
- "Go" (Ai Otsuka song)
- "Go" (Asia song)
- "Go" (Blackpink song), 2026
- "Go" (The Chemical Brothers song)
- "Go!" (Common song)
- "Go" (Delilah song)
- "Go" (Flow song)
- "Go" (Hanson song)
- "Go!" (Joe Inoue song)
- "Go!" (Jupiter Rising song)
- "Go" (McClain Sisters song)
- "Go" (Moby song)
- "Go" (Pearl Jam song)
- "Go" (Scott Fitzgerald song)
- "Go" (The Kid Laroi and Juice Wrld song)
- "Go!" (Tones on Tail song)
- "Go", by Adéla from The Provocateur, 2025
- "Go", by Andy Hunter from Exodus
- "Go", by The Apples in Stereo from The Discovery of a World Inside the Moone
- "Go", by The Black Keys from Let's Rock
- "Go", by Blink-182 from Blink-182
- "Go", by Boys Like Girls from Love Drunk
- "Go", by the Cat Empire from Steal the Light
- "Go", by the Dance Hall Crashers from Lockjaw
- "Go", by Daniel Johnston from Respect
- "Go", by Def Leppard from Songs from the Sparkle Lounge
- "Go!", by DM Ashura
- "Go", by Earshot from The Silver Lining
- "Go", by Grimes featuring Blood Diamonds
- "Go", by H2O from Thicker than Water
- "Go", by Indigo Girls from Come On Now Social
- "Go", by The Innocence Mission from Glow
- "Go", by Jamelia from Walk with Me
- "Go", by Kelly Clarkson
- "Go!", by M83 from Junk
- "Go!", by Marillion from Marillion.com
- "Go!", by Melanie Chisholm from Northern Star
- "Go", by Meg Myers from Make a Shadow
- "Go", by Moka Only from I'm Delighted
- "Go!", by Public Service Broadcasting from The Race for Space
- "Go", by The Replacements from Stink
- "Go!", by Santigold featuring Karen O from Master of My Make-Believe
- "Go", by The Smashing Pumpkins from Machina II/The Friends & Enemies of Modern Music
- "Go", by Steriogram from Schmack!
- "Go", by Tages from Tages 2
- "Go", by Thousand Foot Krutch from The Art of Breaking
- "Go", by Triple C's from Custom Cars & Cycles
- "Go", by Valley Lodge from Use Your Weapons, used as the theme song for Last Week Tonight with John Oliver
- "Go", by The Vandals from Look What I Almost Stepped In...
- "Go!", by will.i.am from Must B 21
- "Go", by Zebrahead from Playmate of the Year
- "Go Go Go", by Chuck Berry, B-side of the single "Come On"

==== Other uses in music ====
- Go (drum), hanja term to refer to Korean drum, buk

=== Television ===
- Go (South African TV channel), a defunct South African channel
- 9Go!, an Australian channel formerly named "GO!"
- PBS Kids Go!, a former PBS kids block for older kids
- GOtv, an African pay television provider
- Go (1973 TV series), an American children's series
- Go (game show), a 1980s American game show
- Gō (TV series), an NHK Taiga drama planned for 2011
- The Go!! Show, also termed Go!!, a 1960s Australian music show
- Go! Princess Pretty Cure, the 12th series in the Pretty Cure franchise
- "Go" (Prison Break), an episode of the television series Prison Break
- "Go!", an episode of Teen Titans
- Morgana Go, a fictional character from the Philippine drama TV series Abot-Kamay na Pangarap

=== Other media ===
- Gō (art-name), a pseudonym used by Japanese artists
- Go (artwork), a pair of artworks by Kehinde Wiley
- GO (American magazine), a free lesbian magazine
- Go! (South African magazine), an English-language version of the Afrikaans travel magazine Weg!
- Go (radio), a Canadian radio program
- Go.com, a web portal created and operated by Disney
- G/O Media, runs Gizmodo, Kotaku, Deadspin and other sites
- Garowe Online, Puntland bilingual news website based in Garowe

== Sports and fitness ==
- The Suns Gorilla, nicknamed "Go", mascot of the Phoenix Suns basketball team
- Go, a large straw battering ram used in the Korean sport of Gossaum
- Go route, a pattern run in American football
- Get Outdoors Georgia ("GO" Georgia), an initiative to promote healthy activities, Georgia, US

== Transportation ==
=== Airlines ===
- Go Fly, a former British airline, now a part of easyJet
- Go! (airline), a Hawaiian airline operated by Mesa Air Group
  - Go! Mokulele, a Hawaiian airline operated as a joint venture of Mesa Air Group and Republic Airways Holdings
- Go First, in India

=== Road and rail ===
- Go! Cooperative, a community-based co-operative train operating company in the UK
- Go-Ahead Group, a UK rail and bus operating company
  - Go North East, a bus unit of Go-Ahead Group
- GoRail, a passenger rail operator in Estonia
- GO Transit, a regional public transit system in Ontario, Canada
- GoTransit (North Carolina), a branding of transit services in the Triangle region of North Carolina
- GO Transit (Wisconsin), the public transit system in Winnebago County, Wisconsin

== Language ==
- Go (verb), an English verb meaning to move from one place to another
- go, in Esperanto orthography, a name for the letter g

== People ==
- Gō (given name), a masculine Japanese given name
- Go (Korean name), or Ko, a Korean family name
- § Politicians
- § Musicians

== Places ==
- Glorioso Islands (FIPS 10-4 territory code), in the Indian Ocean, administered by France
- Goiás (GO), a state of Brazil

== Science and technology ==
=== Medicine, computing, and telecommunications ===
- Global Oncology, an American healthcare organization
- Gene ontology, a bioinformatics initiative
- Go (programming language), also known as Golang, a programming language designed at Google
- Go! (programming language), created by Francis McCabe in 2003
- Go continuous delivery, a software tool for continuous delivery of software
- GO Corp., a pen-based computing company
- Android Go, a stripped-down version of Google's Android operating system designed for low-end smartphones
- Google Go, a mobile app designed to enable use of the Google Search search engine for lower-spec devices and those with slower connections
- Gigaoctet (Go), a unit of information or computer storage
- GO (Malta), a telecommunications company in Malta
- Etihad Atheeb Telecom, a telecommunications company in Saudi Arabia that trades as "GO"

=== Electrical power ===
- Generator owner in electric industry
- Guarantee of origin (GO or GoO), an EU certification for electricity generation

=== Other uses in science and technology ===
- Gō (unit), a traditional Japanese unit of area and volume
- Go, the pass condition in go/no go testing
- Graphite oxide, or, graphene oxide

== Politics ==
=== Politicians ===
- Bong Go (born 1974), Filipino senator and politician
- Mel Go, Filipino politician
- Go of Balhae, Korean general and ruler of the 8th century

=== Other uses in politics ===
- Grassroots Out, a 2016 organisation campaigning for British withdrawal from the European Union

== Other uses ==
- In Venetian cuisine, gò is the grass goby (Zosterisessor ophiocephalus), a kind of fish

== See also ==
- AlphaGo, a computer program that plays the board game Go, developed by DeepMind Technologies while it was a subsidiary of Google
- Gomoku or Gobang, a strategy game traditionally played with go pieces
- Go go (disambiguation)
- No go (disambiguation)
- G0 (disambiguation)
- Goo (disambiguation)
- GGO (disambiguation)
- OG (disambiguation)
