= Pasko (name) =

Pasko or Paško (Macedonian: Паско; Russian or Ukrainian: Пасько) is a Slavic name, often evolved into modern adaptations due to 18th and 19th century migration such as “Pascoe” and “Paskoe” that may refer to the following people:

Given name, nickname or patronymic

- Antun Paško Kazali (1815–1894), Croatian folk-writer, poet and translator
- Pasko Kuzman (born 1947), Macedonian archaeologist
- Pasko Rakic, Yugoslav-born American neuroscientist

Surname

- Aleksey Pasko (1916–1997), Soviet soldier
- Artyom Pasko (born 1992), Russian football player
- Dhimitër Pasko (1907–1967), Albanian writer and translator
- Gennady Pasko (born 1940), Russian impressionist painter
- Grigory Pasko (born 1962), Russian journalist and former Russian Navy officer
- Martin Pasko (1954–2020), Canadian writer and media editor
- Nikolai Pasko (1918–1982), Soviet air force officer
- Paolo Pasko (born 1969), Italian singer-songwriter and musician
- Yevdokiya Pasko (1919–2017), Soviet military pilot
