= Gravity Zero =

Gravity Zero may refer to:

- "Gravity Zero", a 1957 episode of Science Fiction Theatre
- "Gravity Zero", a 2001 single by Two-Mix
- Gravity 0 (stylized: GRAVITY Ø), a 2010 album by Aqua Timez
  - "Gravity 0", a 2010 song by Aqua Timez
- "Gravity Zero", a 2014 single by Paolo Pasko

== See also ==
- "Gravity Zero Gravity", a 2007 song by Shonen Knife off the album Fun! Fun! Fun!
- microgravity
- weightlessness
- Zero Gravity (disambiguation)
- Zero-G (disambiguation)
- G0 (disambiguation)
- Go (disambiguation)
- o (disambiguation)
- 0 (disambiguation)
- Zero (disambiguation)
- Gravity (disambiguation)
