= No go =

No go or Nogo may refer to:

- Nogo A, B, C, or Nogo-66, isoforms of a neurite outgrowth inhibitory protein Reticulon 4.
- No-go area, a military or political term for an area to which access is restricted or travel is dangerous
- No-go pill, a military term for a hypnotic medication taken by soldiers to ensure they are well rested for missions
- go/no go, a process or device used in quality control
- Go-NoGo gauge, an inspection tool used to check a workpiece against its allowed tolerances
- No-go theorem, a theorem that shows that an idea is not possible even though it may look attractive
- Nogo, an alternative name for an African tree more commonly called Lecomtedoxa
- Nogo (drum), a Korean drum

== People ==
- Rajko Nogo (1945–2022), Serbian poet and literary critic
- Salif Nogo (born 1986), Burkinabé-French footballer
- Srđan Nogo (born 1981), Serbian politician

== Places ==
Australia

- Nogo River, a tributary of the Burnett River

United States

- Nogo, Arkansas, a small, unincorporated community
- Nogo, Missouri, a former town in Greene County

== Entertainment ==
- "Say No Go", a single by De La Soul
- "No-Go Showboat", a song written for the American rock band The Beach Boys from their album Little Deuce Coupe
- Hikaru no Go, a popular Japanese anime and manga
- Hikaru no Go 3, a video game of the board game genre released in 2003 by Konami
- Nogo (instrument), a traditional Korean drum set

== See also ==
- Go (disambiguation)
