= Mulroy =

Mulroy may refer to:

== People ==
- Mulroy (surname), a list of people with the surname

== Places ==
- Mulroy, Missouri, United States, a former town, now part of the city of Strafford
- Mulroy Bay, County Donegal, Ireland
- Mulroy Island, Ellsworth Land, Antarctica

== Other uses ==
- Battle of Mulroy, a Scottish clan battle fought in August 1688
