= Mikhail Petrovich Petrov =

Mikhail Petrovich Petrov may refer to:

- Mikhail Petrovich Petrov (colonel) (1904–1967), Tatar Soviet Army colonel
- Mikhail Petrovich Petrov (general) (1898–1941), Red Army major general
