= 0G =

0G, 0-G may refer to:

- 0G (album), 2001, by Two-Mix
- 0G, or Zero Generation, the mobile telephony for Mobile radio telephone
- Zero gravity, an alternative term for weightlessness
- Zero game, a state in game theory where neither player has any legal options
- Zero grade, a type of Indo-European ablaut
- Zero group, a type of mathematical trivial group
- Zero Gravity Corporation

== See also ==
- Zero-G (disambiguation)
- OG (disambiguation)
- G0 (disambiguation)
