= Zero Gravity (disambiguation) =

Zero gravity refers to weightlessness.

Zero gravity may also refer to:

== Aerospace ==
- Zero Gravity Corporation, a company operating weightless flights
- Zero Gravity Paragliders, a South Korean aircraft manufacturer
- Zero Gravity Pen or Space Pen, a brand of pen that uses pressurized ink cartridges
- Zero gravity toilet or space toilet, a toilet that can be used in a low-gravity environment

== Groups and organizations ==
- Zero Gravity Entertainment, a videogame studio that released the video game X-Men: The Ravages of Apocalypse\
- Zero Gravity, a UK-based education technology company

== Entertainment ==
- Sonic Riders: Zero Gravity, a video game
- "Zero Gravity", an episode of the TV show The Big World of Little Adam
- Wayne Shorter: Zero Gravity, a 2015 documentary about saxophonist Wayne Shorter
- Z-G (Zero Gravity), a collectible action figure game
- Zero Gravity, a term for a type of Round Up (ride)

=== Music ===
- "Zero Gravity" (Kerli song), 2012 song by Kerli
- "Zero Gravity" (Kate Miller-Heidke song), 2019 song that will represent Australia in the Eurovision Song Contest 2019
- Zero Gravity II, a 2014 mixtape by Los
- Zero Gravity I, a 2010 mixtape by Los (rapper)
- "Zero Gravity", 2004 song by Blank & Jones from the album Monument (Blank & Jones album)
- "Zero Gravity", 2009 song by Perfume from the album Triangle (Perfume album)
- "Zero Gravity", 2009 song by David Archuleta
- "Zero Gravity", 2015 song by Borgeous
- "Zero Gravity", 2015 single by Jean Michel Jarre with Tangerine Dream from the album Electronica 1: The Time Machine
- "Zero Gravity", 2016 song by ZERO-G; see List of Billboard China V Chart number-one videos of 2016
- "0-GRAVITY", 2012 song by Granrodeo off the album Crack Star Flash

== Other uses ==
- A1 Zero Gravity Championship, a pro-wrestling championship from A1 (Alpha-1) wrestling promotion
- Zero Gravity Amusement Park, Dallas, Texas, USA

== See also ==
- "Zero Gravity Zone", an episode of the television series Code Lyoko
- "Gravity Zero Gravity", a 2007 song by Shonen Knife off the album Fun! Fun! Fun!
- zero-gravity roll on roller coasters
- Zero-G (disambiguation)
- Gravity Zero (disambiguation)
