= Zero-G (disambiguation) =

Zero-G is the ability to achieve the sensation of weightlessness (for example to be falling freely in an atmosphere, or to be in zero-g). Zero-G or Zero G may refer to:

== Companies ==
- Zero Gravity Corporation (operating as Zero-G), a U.S. flight adventure company that operates simulated zero-gravity flights
- Zero-G Ltd, a privately held U.K. company producing sample CDs
- Zero-G (studio), a Japanese animation studio
- ZeroG Wireless, a fabless semiconductor company

== Arts, entertainment, media ==
- ZER0-G, a Chinese music project; see List of Billboard China V Chart number-one videos of 2016
- Zero-G, season 4 of Beyblade: Metal Fusion, a Japanese anime TV cartoon

=== Characters ===
- Kiju type 0‐G Breaker, a type of mechagozila in the Godzilla franchise
- Zero-G, a Marvel Comics character from Power Pack

=== Literature ===
- Zero G, a 2018 science fiction novel by Dan Wells
- Zero-G, a science fiction graphic novel authored by Alex Zamm
- Beyblade: Zero-G, a Japanese manga comic book

== Vehicles ==
- S3 Zero G, an A300 aircraft used to perform zero-gravity flight by S3 (Swiss Space Systems)
- Zero G, an Airbus A310 operated by AirZeroG for parabolic weightlessness flights

== Other uses ==
- ICW Zero-G Championship, a British pro-wrestling championship
- 0G (zero G), generation zero mobile radio telephone

== See also ==
- G-Zero world, political science term referring to a leaderless world
- zero-G flight
- zero-G aircraft
- Zero gravity (disambiguation)
- G0 (disambiguation)
- 0G (disambiguation)
- OG (disambiguation)
- Gravity Zero (disambiguation)
