= Konstantin Polozov =

Russian ice hockey player (1966–2025)

Konstantin Polozov (4 May 1966 – 19 August 2025) was a Russian ice hockey player. He was head coach of the hockey clubs of the Salavat Yulaev system. Polozov died on 19 August 2025, at the age of 59.

== See also ==
- List of Heroes of the Soviet Union (P)
