= Juldarigi =

Traditional Korean sport similar to tug of war

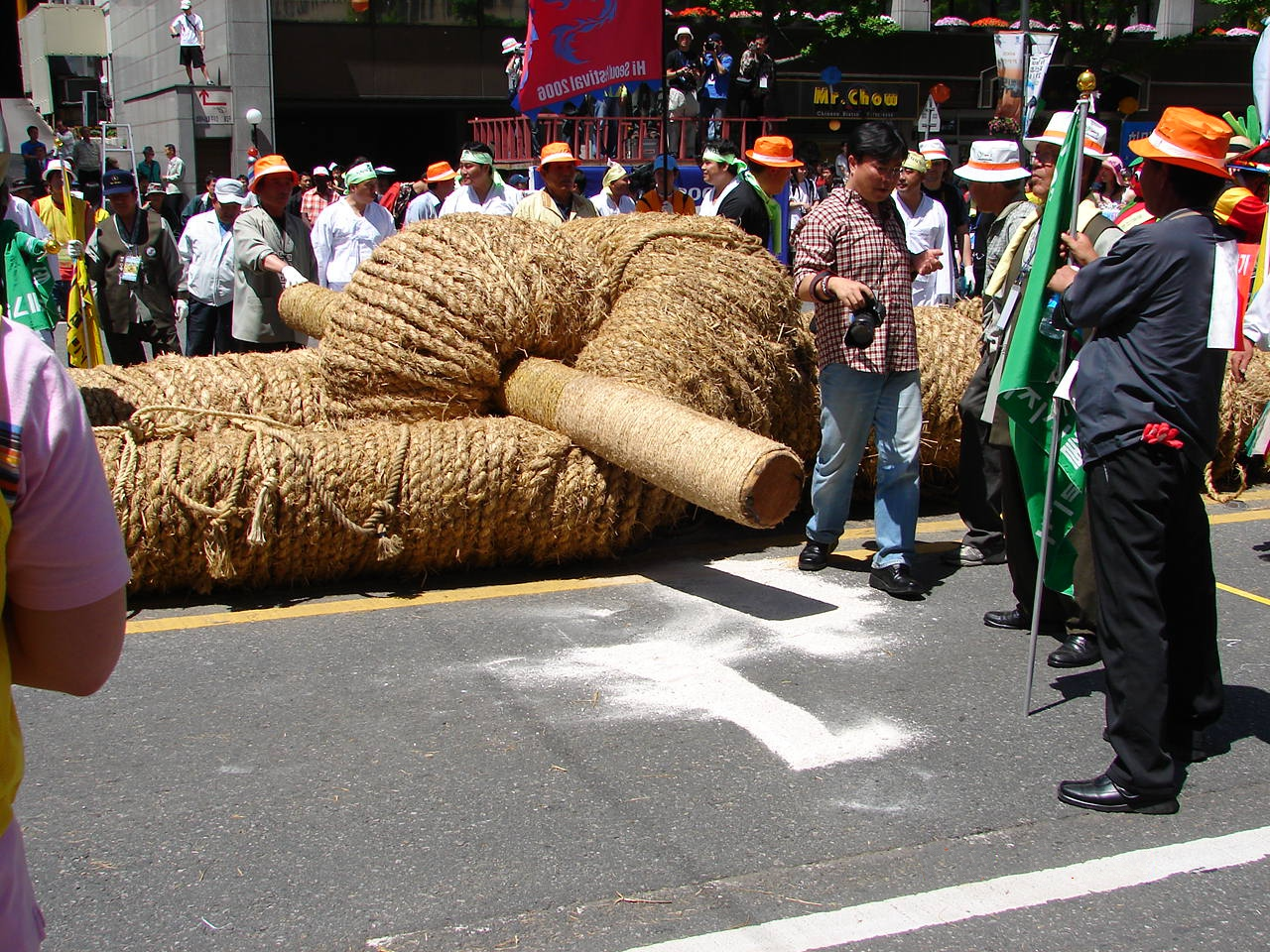
- A juldarigi rope knotted around a binyeomok at the Hi! Seoul Festival
- First played: Known since at least 1500 C.E.

Characteristics
- Contact: Non-contact
- Mixed-sex: Yes
- Type: Team sport, traditional, outdoor
- Equipment: Rice-straw ropes, binyeomok peg

Presence
- Country or region: Korea, particularly Dangjin and Yeongsang

Juldarigi (Korean: 줄다리기, also chuldarigi) is a traditional Korean sport similar to tug of war. It has a ritual and divinatory significance to many agricultural communities in the country, and is performed at festivals and community gatherings. The sport uses two huge rice-straw ropes, connected by a central peg, which are pulled by teams representing the East and West sides of the village (the competition is often rigged in favour of the Western team). A number of religious and traditional rituals are performed before and after the actual competition.

Several areas of Korea have their own distinct variations of juldarigi, and similar tug-of-war games with connections to agriculture are found in rural communities across Southeast Asia.

It is inscribed in UNESCO Intangible Cultural Heritage List from 2015 as "Tugging rituals and games" along with other similar forms in Cambodia, the Philippines and Viet Nam. It is also enlisted as South Korean Intangible Cultural Property from 1969.

== Cultural significance ==
Juldarigi is an important part of several agricultural celebrations, and is a common event at the Daeboreum lunar festival.

As with many Korean rural folk traditions, the sport is regarded as a predictor of future events, specifically harvests. The outcome of a ritualised contest between the two sides of a village (East and West) was seen as an indicator of the abundance (or otherwise) of that year's rice crop, which would be harvested in the autumn; as a result, juldarigi and similar folk sports are predominant in the rice-growing areas of the South. This is due to the common association in Southeast Asia between dragons (which the ropes of the juldarigi are thought to resemble) and rain; as a result juldarigi or similar tug-of-war ceremonies have also historically been staged during periods of drought. The connection of the two ropes used (with one rope's smaller loop being placed through the other's larger loop) is reminiscent of sexual intercourse, which also gives rise to the sport's association with fecundity.

== Equipment ==
The straw ropes used in juldarigi are immense, up to 200m in length and 1m in diameter. They can weigh as much as 40 tons. They are constructed of twisted rice straw; this choice of material is symbolic, since rice is the staple grain in the areas where juldarigi is practiced. The construction process is a communal event, reflecting the communal nature of rice cultivation. Two ropes are used, one for each team; they are connected by a wooden beam or stump known as a binyeomok, around three metres long. The rope held by the Eastern team is termed the sutjul (Korean: 숫줄 "male rope") and the Western team hold the amjul (Korean: 암줄 "female rope"). Because of the ropes' great size, they cannot be grasped directly; players attached smaller side-ropes to the main rope to act as handles and fray its ends to provide additional hand-holds.

== Ceremony ==
The ceremony leading up to the tug of war begins at around midnight on the eve of the festival. Both teams repair to their respective ropes and offer prayers for victory; this rite is known as goyu (Korean: 고유; Hanja: 告由). During this time, the teams guard their ropes against tampering, as well as preventing members of the opposing team from stepping over it (it is believed that a woman who steps over the rope at this time will conceive a male heir). Punishments can be severe; there are records of a woman being stoned to death in the early 20th century for such an infraction. The teams then gather at the festival site and perform further prayers, this time for the safety and prosperity of the village; sacrifices are also offered to Teojushin, the earth goddess. These communal rituals are called gosa (Korean: 고사; Hanja: 告祀). At dawn, after the completion of these ceremonies, the two teams fetch their ropes to the site; this involves a procession with flags and costumes, accompanied by percussion music. There is then a staged debate over the connection of the two ropes, which has a symbolic sexual aspect; innuendo and bawdy taunts of the other team are common.

Once the two ropes are lashed together around the binyeomok, the contest begins, to the shouts and cheers of the celebrants. The actual competition is short, with victory usually decided after a single pull (although some contests are played to best of three). Because of the association of the Western direction with the concept of fertility and fecundity, the match is often fixed to ensure that the West team win (and thus ensure a bounteous harvest). After celebrating at the house of their team's captain, the winners will then proceed to the house of the losing team's captain to offer their commiserations; this often resembles a funeral procession. Both ropes are taken by the winning team, dissected and sold; the straw taken from them is believed to have unusual protective or nourishing properties.

A children's version, known as gosat juldarigi (Korean: 고삿줄다리기, "alley tug-of-war") is often played in the streets before the main event.

== Regional variations ==
Two forms of juldarigi, from Gijisi (Dangjin) and Yeongsang, are recognised as Important Intangible Cultural Properties of Korea. The Yeongsan ceremony is held later in the year than elsewhere, having been moved from the lunar festival to March 1 in the mid-twentieth century (to commemorate the March First Movement). In 2009, a special ₩20000 coin was minted in South Korea commemorating the Yeongsan juldarigi. In Gijisi, where the sport has been practiced for at least 500 years, the traditional East/West divide is replaced with a division of teams into upriver and downriver. The centipede-like shape of the rope is said to resemble the way in which the villages of the region are arranged. Gijisi is also home to a museum devoted to the practice of juldarigi.

The Miryang Baekjung Festival features a unique form of this sport called gejuldarigi (Korean: 게줄다리기) or "crab tug-of-war", which is unique to Miryang. In this version, participants are tied by ropes to a central ring, and pull in all directions.

Similar communal tug-of-war games take place in Laos, Cambodia and Myanmar, in all cases having a connection to fecundity and the prospect of a bountiful harvest.

== See also ==
- Tug of war
- Gossuam
