= Tugging rituals and games =

Asian and Pacific Islanders cultural practices

- UNESCO Intangible Cultural Heritage
- Country: Cambodia - Lbaengteanhprot; Philippines - Punnuk; South Korea - Juldarigi; Vietnam - Keo co
- Reference: 01080
- Region: Asia and the Pacific

Inscription history
- Inscription: 2015 (10th session)
- List: Representative

Tugging rituals and games are four cultural practices in Cambodia, Philippines, South Korea, and Vietnam, which were collectively included in UNESCO's Intangible Cultural Heritage of Humanity List in 2015. The tugging rituals and games, namely lbaengteanhprot (Khmer: ល្បែងទាញព្រ័ត្រ), punnuk, juldarigi (Korean: 줄다리기), and keo co (Vietnamese: kéo co), include two teams, with each pulling one end of a rope, attempting to tug it from the other.

The tugging rituals and games promote social solidarity, provide entertainment and mark the start of a new agricultural cycle. While these traditional practices often emphasize competition, the game is intended to show the importance of cooperation.

They are often organized in front of a village's communal house or shrine, preceded by commemorative rites to local protective deities. Village elders play active roles in leading and organizing younger people in playing the game and holding accompanying rituals.

== Rituals and games ==
=== Lbaengteanhprot ===
Lbaengteanhprot is performed during the Cambodian New Year and Chlong Chet, a rice farming festivity. It is performed by two opposing teams, normally women against men, in an open space at a village center or in a Buddhist monastery compound.

The tugging ritual and game is practiced among the rice cultivating communities located around Tonle Sap and the area north of Angkor Wat, a UNESCO World Heritage Site.

=== Punnuk ===
In the Philippines, punnuk is practiced in Hungduan, Ifugao. The tugging ritual and game, held at the Hapao River, is performed after the completion of harvest. It formally closes the farming cycle and signals the beginning of a new one upon commencing with the punnuk.

The tugging ritual and game consists of groups of men wielding a hooked sapling of the attoba tree. The men use the hook to hold on to a woven anthropomorphic figure that is thrown in the middle of the river. They pull against the other contenders. It is believed that the winning group will have a bountiful harvest.

=== Juldarigi ===
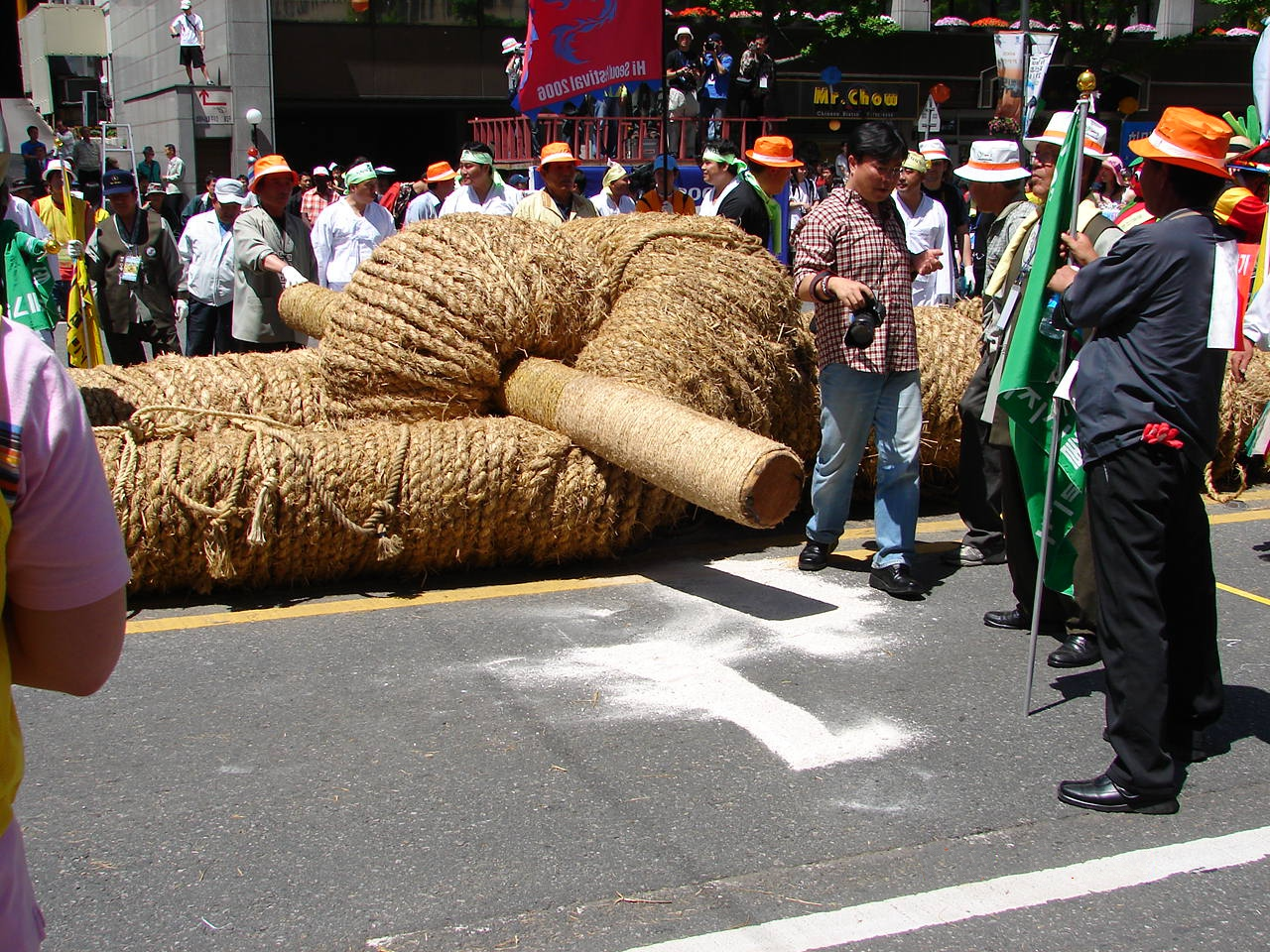
Juldarigi rope

The South Korean juldarigi is practiced in the agricultural areas of Dangjin, Namhae, Milyang, and Uiryeong, and the fishing area of Samcheok. The ropes used in juldarigi are made from kudzu, hemp, or rice straw, depending on the geographical or ecological conditions on a region or the characteristics of the local livelihood. Rope production requires the concerted efforts of the entire community over a period of almost a month. The rope symbolizes a dragon, which is believed to bring rain.

The tugging ritual and game divides the group into two teams. In places that divide participants into teams by gender, it is generally believed that women must win to bring prosperity and fertility. Meanwhile, in regions that divide teams by township, it is thought that good fortune is brought by the victory of the team from an eastward town.

=== Keo co ===
In Viet Nam, keo co is practiced mostly in the northern midlands, the Red River Delta, the north-central region, and Lao Cai Province. The tugging ritual and game is often held as a part of the spring festivities, marking the beginning of a new farming cycle and expressing wishes for healthy crops. In some areas, keo co is also tied to the stories of local heroes and their contributions in fighting against invaders and defending the people.

The tugging ritual and game is often organized in front of a village's communal house or shrine, preceded by rites for the local deities. The materials used in keo co vary depending on the ecological and cultural context of each community. They can be made of bamboo poles, rattan cords, or hemp.
