= Mikhail Petrov (colonel) =

Tatar Soviet Army colonel and Hero of the Soviet Union

- Михаил Петрович Петров
- Born: 17 November 1904; Starye Sharashli, Bakalinsky Volost, Belebeyevsky Uyezd, Ufa Governorate, Russian Empire
- Died: 5 August 1967 (aged 62); Vinnytsia, Ukrainian SSR, Soviet Union
- Military career
- Allegiance: Soviet Union
- Branch: Red Army/Soviet Army
- Service years: 1926–1954
- Rank: Colonel
- Unit: 139th Rifle Division
- Conflicts: World War II; Operation Bagration
- Awards: Hero of the Soviet Union

Mikhail Petrovich Petrov (Russian: Михаил Петрович Петров; 17 November 1904 – 5 August 1967) was a Tatar Soviet Army colonel and a Hero of the Soviet Union. Petrov was awarded the title for his actions in Operation Bagration, during which he led his regiment in encircling Mogilev. He continued to serve in the Soviet Army postwar, retiring in 1954, after which he moved to Vinnytsia.

== Early life ==
Petrov was born on 17 November 1904 in the village of Starye Sharashli in Ufa Governorate, now in the Bakalinsky District of Bashkortostan, to a peasant family. After graduating from school in the village of Bakaly in 1916, he worked as a messenger at the volost (parish) committee for four years before becoming a lineman of the Baysorovsky Telegraph Department in the Bashkir Autonomous Soviet Socialist Republic. In 1926, he was drafted into the Red Army. In 1929, he became a Communist Party of the Soviet Union member. Petrov became a political officer, rising to commissar of the 9th Separate Disciplinary Battalion of the Moscow Military District in 1940.

== World War II ==
Petrov fought in World War II from November 1941, originally as a battalion commissar. On 10 January 1942, he was awarded the Order of the Red Banner. In 1944, he graduated from the Vystrel course. Petrov became commander of the 139th Rifle Division's 364th Rifle Regiment. Petrov led the regiment in Operation Bagration. Breaking through German defenses, the regiment crossed the Pronya River, the Basy River, and the Resta River between 24 and 26 June 1944. On 27 June, Petrov was awarded the Order of the Red Banner. On 28 June the regiment crossed the Dnieper south of Mogilev. The regiment captured 215 settlements and cut off the German retreat. According to Petrov's superiors, the regiment captured 242 soldiers, 120 guns, 600 machine guns and automatic rifles, 12 tractors, 9 warehouses, 235 motor vehicles, and killed 1,200 German soldiers. He was awarded the Order of Alexander Nevsky on 19 September. On 24 March 1945, Petrov was awarded the title Hero of the Soviet Union and the Order of Lenin.

== Postwar ==
In 1949, Petrov graduated from the Leningrad Higher Armored School. He retired in 1954 as a colonel, then lived and worked in Vinnytsia. He died there on 5 August 1967.
