= OG =

OG, O.G., or Og may refer to:

== Arts and entertainment ==
=== Characters ===
- Og, in Time Bandits
- Og, in Mike, Lu & Og
- Og, the leprechaun in the stage musical Finian's Rainbow and the subsequent film adaptation
- Ogden "Og" Morrow, in Ready Player One
- Original Girls, in the TV series Teen Mom OG

=== Music ===
- "O.G.", a song by Snoop Dogg from Death Row: The Lost Sessions Vol. 1
- "O.G. Original Gangster", a song by Ice-T
- Omnium Gatherum, or OG, a Finnish band
- They Call Him OG (soundtrack), soundtrack album by Thaman S from the 2025 film of the same name

=== Other uses in arts and entertainment ===
- O.G. (film), a 2018 American film
- They Call Him OG, a 2025 Indian film by Sujeeth
- Og, the setting of the novel The Secret World of Og and its associated film

== People ==
- Og, an ancient Amorite king of Bashan
- OG Anunoby (born 1997), British basketball player
- Ogom Chijindu, Nigerian sportswoman known as "OG"

== Science and technology ==
- Oganesson, symbol Og, a chemical element
- Obstetrics and gynaecology
- Orange G, a synthetic dye
- Original gravity, used in calculating the alcohol content of a drink
- og, a namespace identifier typically tied in web pages to the Facebook Open Graph protocol

== Sports ==
- OG (esports), a professional Dota 2 team
- Offensive guard, a player position in American and Canadian football
- Own goal, goal scored for the opposition

== Other uses ==
- Original Gangsters (gang), a Swedish gang
- River Og, Wiltshire, England
- One-Two-GO Airlines (IATA airline code: OG)

== See also ==
- Ogee, an object, element, or curve that has a serpentine- or extended S-shape
- Original (disambiguation)
- 0G (disambiguation)
- Zero-G (disambiguation)
