= Dmitry Pogodin =

Soviet general

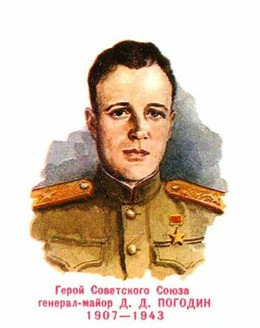
- Native name: Дмитрий Дмитриевич Погодин
- Born: 11 September 1907 Naro-Fominsk, Russian Empire (located within present-day Moscow Oblast)
- Died: 13 September 1943 (aged 36) Perekip, Kharkiv Oblast, Ukrainian SSR
- Allegiance: Soviet Union
- Rank: Major general
- Conflicts: Spanish Civil War; World War II; Soviet invasion of Poland; Winter War
- Awards: Hero of Soviet Union; Order of Lenin; Order of the Red Banner; Order of the Patriotic War

Dmitry Dmitrievich Pogodin (Russian: Дмитрий Дмитриевич Погодин; 11 September 1907 - 13 September 1943) was a Russian tank company commander in the Spanish Civil War who was awarded the title Hero of the Soviet Union. After serving in the Spanish Republican Army he rose through the ranks of the Red Army, seeing combat during the Soviet invasion of Poland and Winter War before his death in World War II when he was a major-general. He was a member of Central Committee of the Communist Party of Byelorussia.

== Biography ==
Pogodin was born on 11 September 1907 in Naro-Fominsk in a working-class Russian family. He had six classes of education in school in Yegoryevsk and a professional technical school. For some time he worked as assistant of a foreman on one of factories in Yegoryevsk. Since 1931 he served in the Red Army and was a member of Communist Party (bolsheviks). In 1932 he graduated from Oryol Tank Academy, and later from Courses for Improvement of the Command Staff in Kazan. He served as a commander of tank company in Belorussian Military District.

Since October 1936 till January 1937 Pogodin participated in the Spanish Civil War, where he succeeded during the Siege of Madrid in battle near Pozuelo de Alarcón. Tank company under command of lieutenant Pogodin attacked the enemy and knocked out 9 enemy tanks. He several times helped troops to retake the lost positions.

By the decree of the Presidium of the Supreme Soviet of the USSR at December 31, 1936, Dmitry Pogodin was awarded the title of Hero of Soviet Union and Order of Lenin for his valour shown in action in Spain. Later, in 1939, he was awarded the Gold Star No.26.

After his return from Spain in 1937 Pogodin continued his service as commander of tank company in Belorussian Military District. He was elected into the Central Committee of Communist Party (bolsheviks) of Byelorussia.

In 1939 Pogodin participated along the troops of the district in the Soviet invasion of Poland.

Later in this year he graduated from Frunze Military Academy, was the assistant commander of armored troops of Leningrad Military District, commander of the mechanized detachment of the district. He participated in the Winter War.

During the Nazi invasion of Soviet Union Pogodin was the commander of 1st Tank Regiment of 1st Tank Division. During the first days of war the regiment was deployed near Kandalaksha. At July 17, 1941, the regiment was sent to Krasnogvardeysk, to the south from Leningrad.

At August 11, 1941 the 1st Tank Division engaged 1st Panzer Division at around Moloskovitsy, but lost the battle with heavy casualties. But at August 20, 1941, a company of heavy tanks under command of Zinoviy Kolobanov (Pogodin's subordinate) managed to defeat much larger Nazi force, knocking out 43 tanks.

Later colonel Pogodin became deputy commander of 123rd Tank Brigade on the Western Front, commander of 108th Tank Brigade in April 1942, deputy commander of 30th Army (responsible for armored troops), deputy commander of automobile and armored troops of Kalinin front, deputy commander of the 1st Mechanized Corps of 53rd Army, Steppe Front.

Hero of Soviet Union, colonel Pogodin was killed in action near Perekip village, near Kharkiv at September 13, 1943, personally participating in a tank attack in crucial moment of battle. His burnt body was carried away from burning tank by his mechanic-driver, starshina A.A. Gorelyshev. After his death Pogodin was promoted to major general (at February 14, 1944) and awarded with the Order of the Red Banner for successful command of the vanguard of the 1st Mechanized Corps, capture of several fortified positions and personal boldness (he personally participated in several attacks and carried out a reconnaissance mission).

He was buried in Vladimir, where his evacuated family lived. At first his remains were interred at the central Sobornaya Square, but in 1946 after his mother's request, they were buried on the old city cemetery.

== Awards ==
- Hero of Soviet Union (31 December 1936)
- Order of Lenin (31 December 1936)
- Order of the Red Banner (27 September 1943)
- Order of the Patriotic War 1st class
- Medal "For the Defence of Leningrad"
- jubilee medals

== Memory ==
A memorial plaque was installed in Perekip, at the place of Pogodin's death. Streets in Naro-Fominsk and Vladimir are named after him. A bas relief of Dmitry Pogodin is installed at the memorial on Victory Square in Vladimir.

Post of the USSR printed an envelope with Pogodin's picture.
