= Pyotr Mikhailovich Petrov =

Hero of the Soviet Union

- Born: 16 January 1910; Petrozavodsk, Russian Empire
- Died: 23 November 1941 (aged 31) near Urazovo, Kursk Oblast, Soviet Union
- Military career
- Branch: Soviet Air Force
- Service years: 1929–41
- Rank: Major
- Commands: 254th Fighter Aviation Regiment
- Conflicts: World War II; Winter War; Eastern Front
- Awards: Hero of the Soviet Union; Order of Lenin; Order of the Red Banner

Pyotr Mikhailovich Petrov (Russian: Пётр Михайлович Петров; 16 January 1910 – 23 November 1941) was a Soviet Air Force major, flying ace, and a Hero of the Soviet Union. Petrov fought in the Winter War and was awarded the title Hero of the Soviet Union for landing his Polikarpov I-15bis on a frozen lake under fire to rescue a downed pilot. During the Winter War he claimed several victories. Petrov became commander of the 254th Fighter Aviation Regiment and led it during the first months after the German invasion of the Soviet Union. Petrov claimed about ten German aircraft until he was killed on 23 November 1941 when his Polikarpov I-16 was shot down by friendly fire.

== Early life and Interwar ==
Petrov was born on 16 January 1910 in Petrozavodsk to a working-class family. He graduated from seven classes at Railway School No. 9 and worked as a mechanic at the rail depot of Petrozavodsk station. He became a Komsomol member. Petrov was drafted into the Red Army on a Komsomol direction in 1929. He entered the Leningrad Air Force Flight-Technical School, after which he served as a mechanic in the Moscow Military District Air Force. In 1932, he joined the Communist Party of the Soviet Union. In 1936, he graduated from the Borisoglebsk Military Aviation School and became a squadron commander.

== Winter War and World War II ==
Petrov became commander of the 3rd Squadron of the 68th Fighter Aviation Regiment in the Winter War. He made several victory claims during the war. On 17 February 1940, on Lake Muola-Jarvi, pilot N. Kosichkin was shot down and crash landed on the ice. Petrov landed and strapped Kosichkin to the skis of his I-15bis under Finnish fire. When Petrov landed at his base, there were about 100 holes in the fuselage of his plane. On 7 April 1940, Petrov was awarded the title Hero of the Soviet Union and the Order of Lenin, becoming the first person born in Karelia to receive the distinction.

Petrov became commander of the Polikarpov I-16-equipped 254th Fighter Aviation Regiment of the 36th Aviation Division, part of the Air Force of the Southwestern Front. He led the regiment after the German invasion of the Soviet Union. Due to a lack of airplanes, the pilots of the regiment made seven to eight sorties a day. During an air battle over Kiev, Petrov was attacked by six Messerschmitt Bf 109s and was wounded in the shoulder. In the engagement, he was able to shoot down one of them. By November 1941, Petrov had claimed around ten personal and shared victories. On 23 November 1941, Petrov was shot down and killed by friendly antiaircraft fire near Urazovo. He was buried in the village. Petrov was posthumously awarded the Order of the Red Banner on 29 December 1941.

== Legacy ==
A street in Petrozavodsk was named for Petrov. On 8 May 2009 a plaque was placed in the Petrozavodsk station rail depot.

== Personal life ==
Petrov married Galina Semyonovna and had a son, Anatoly, who later became a Soviet Air Force lieutenant colonel.
