= GGO =

GGO may refer to:

- AI Football GGO, a Chinese television series
- Greater Greensboro Open, later the Wyndham Championship, an American golf tournament
- Ground-glass opacity
- Guiglo Airport, in Ivory Coast
- Sword Art Online Alternative Gun Gale Online, a Japanese light novel series.
