= G0 =

G0, G^{0}, G_{0}, g_{0}, or G-zero, may refer to:

== Science ==
- G_{0} phase of cell division
- G0 star, a subclass of G-class stars
- Conductance quantum ("quantum of conductance"), notated G_{0}
- Geometric continuity, notated G^{0}
- Group 0, an alternate name for Group 18 of the Periodic table – the Noble gases
  - G0, a hypothetical group in the Periodic table, which would consist of neutronium
- Standard gravity, notated g_{0}

== Other uses ==
- G0, abbreviation for ground zero
- G0, the name of the musical note G in octave 0
- G-Zero world – the term used for the emerging power vacuum in international politics in the early 21st Century
- Ghana International Airlines, IATA airline designator G0
- G0, a block of character codes in the Teletext character set

== See also ==
- 0G (disambiguation)
- Go (disambiguation)
- Zero-G (disambiguation)
