= Stepan Polyansky =

Hero of the Soviet Union (1913–1943)

Stepan Ivanovich Polyansky
- Степан Иванович Полянский
- Born: 5 April 1913; Maistrov, Novograd-Volynsky Uyezd, Volhynian Governorate, Russian Empire
- Died: 10 September 1943 (aged 30); Kharkov, Ukrainian SSR, Soviet Union
- Military career
- Allegiance: Soviet Union
- Branch: Infantry
- Service years: 1935–1943
- Rank: Lieutenant colonel
- Conflicts: World War II; Winter War; Eastern Front
- Awards: Hero of the Soviet Union; Order of Lenin; Order of the Red Banner (2)

Stepan Ivanovich Polyansky (Russian: Степан Иванович Полянский; Ukrainian: Степан Іванович Полянський; 1913 – 1943) was a Soviet officer, participant in the Soviet-Finnish war. Regiment and division commander in the Great Patriotic War. Hero of the Soviet Union (04/07/1940). Lieutenant colonel (1943). (Note: In a series of publications, it is erroneously stated that at the time of the offensive, Polyansky was a colonel (for example, in volume 4 of the biographical dictionary "The Great Patriotic War. Divisional Commanders", pp. 61-62). However, in all documents about the realities and the burial of Polyansky, as well as in his last award sheet, assigned by a higher commander after his death, he was a lieutenant colonel.)

== Biography ==
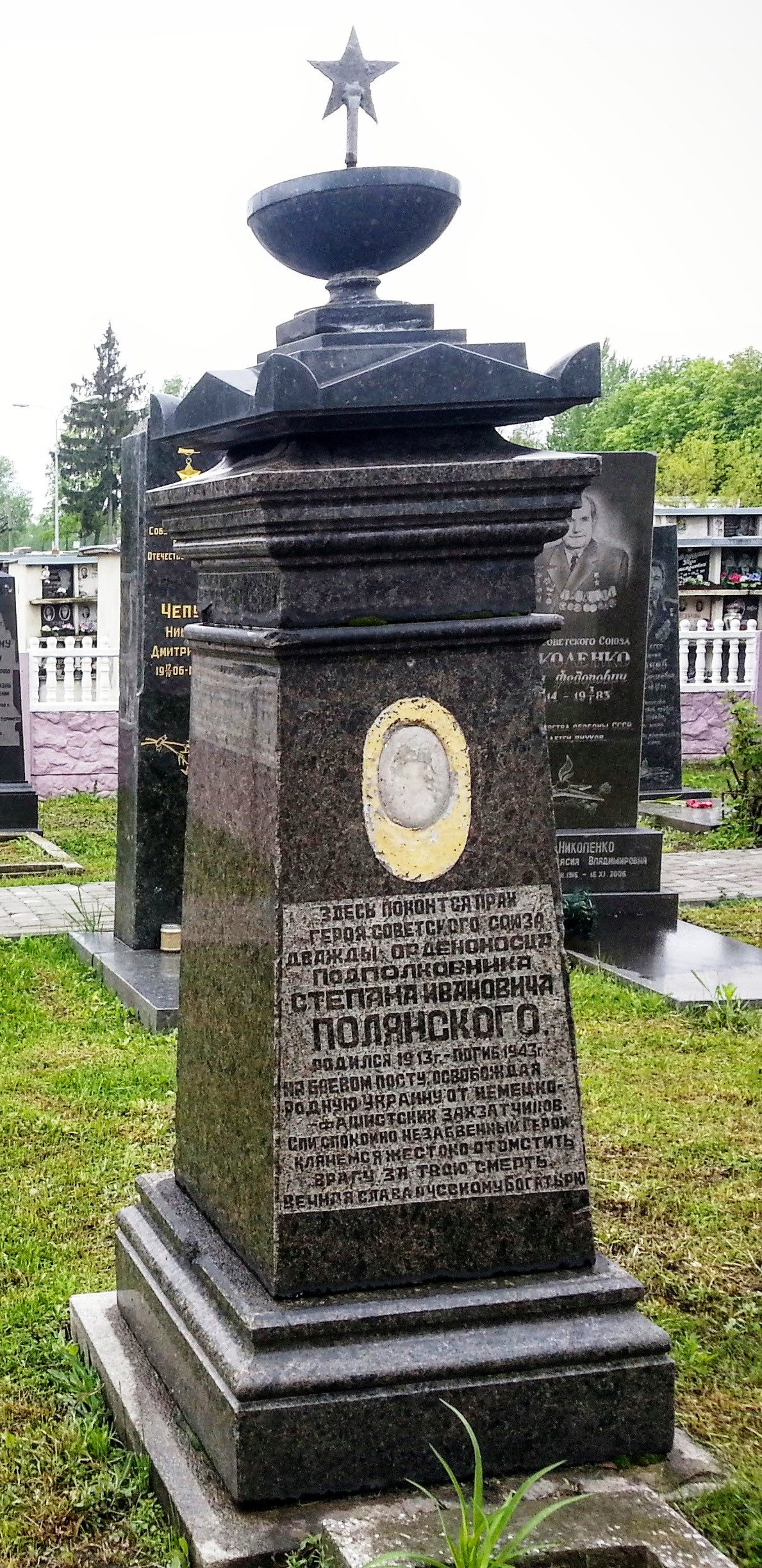
Gravestone of Polyansky on the Alley of Heroes of the city cemetery No. 2 in Kharkov

Polyansky was born on April 5 (18), 1913 in the village of Maistrov, Novograd-Volynsky Uyezd, Volhynian Governorate of the Russian Empire (now Zvyagelsky district, Zhytomyr region, Ukraine) into a peasant family. Pole (Note: Nationality "Pole" is indicated in the award documents of the Polyansky period of the Great Patriotic War, published in the OBD "Memory of the People" and in his biography in the 5th volume of the biographical dictionary "The Great Patriotic War. Divisional Commanders" (Moscow, 2014), compiled on the basis of personal files from the archives of the Russian Ministry of Defense..) or Ukrainian (Note: In the 2nd volume of the biographical dictionary "Heroes of the Soviet Union" published in 1988, the Ukrainian nationality was indicated.) by nationality.

In 1925 he graduated from the 4th grade of elementary school, in 1932 - courses for foremen. He worked as a foreman of the field-growing brigade of the collective farm "For a New Life" in his native village (Maistrovsky village council.

In November 1935 he joined the Red Army. In 1938 he graduated from the Kharkov School of Chervonny Elders named after the Central Executive Committee of the Ukrainian SSR. He served in the 233rd Rifle Regiment of the 97th Rifle Division of the Kiev Special Military District: platoon commander, company commander, assistant chief of staff of the regiment. In September 1939, as a company commander, he took part in the Liberation Campaign of the Red Army in Western Ukraine (the division operated as part of the 17th Rifle Corps of the 6th Army of the Ukrainian Front).

Participant of the Soviet-Finnish war of 1939-1940 from February 1940, when the division arrived at the front on the Karelian Isthmus. Then Lieutenant S.I. Polyansky commanded the 1st Infantry Battalion of the 233rd Infantry Regiment. On February 11, 1940, when the company's advance was stopped by withering machine-gun fire from a Finnish reinforced concrete pillbox, under the cover of a blizzard that had begun, he led the bypass movement of the assault group. The fighters broke into the trench, in hand-to-hand combat they destroyed several Finnish soldiers, then they approached the pillbox along the trench and installed explosive charges on it. The pillbox was destroyed by the explosion, the offensive continued. Polyansky was wounded three times in this battle, but did not leave the battlefield. Only after the battle was he sent to the hospital.

By decree of the Presidium of the Supreme Soviet of the USSR of April 7, 1940, "for the exemplary performance of the combat missions of the Command on the front of the fight against the Finnish White Guard and the courage and heroism shown at the same time," (Note: Quote from the text of the Decree of the Presidium of the Supreme Soviet of the USSR.) Lieutenant Stepan Ivanovich Polyansky was awarded the title of Hero of the Soviet Union with the Order of Lenin and the Gold Star medal.

After recovering in July 1940, he was appointed chief of staff of the 233rd Infantry Regiment. Member of the CPSU (b) since 1940. Before the war, in June 1941, he was enrolled in the academy. In 1942 he graduated from the accelerated course of the Military Academy of the Red Army named after M. V. Frunze.

In May 1942, he was appointed commander of the 468th Infantry Regiment of the 111th Infantry Division, which was completing its formation in the Moscow Military District (town Bezhetsk, Kalinin Region). Participated in the battles of the Great Patriotic War from July 1942, when his regiment as part of a division arrived at the front. He fought in the 30th, 39th and 61st armies on the Northwestern Front. Skillfully commanded the regiment during the First Rzhev-Sychev operation, in difficult conditions in August–September 1942, the regiment liberated 6 settlements and cleared the banks of the Volga from German troops. In this operation, the regiment destroyed up to 2000 German soldiers and captured 27 prisoners.

Then the division and the regiment were transferred to the Voronezh Front, transferred to the 3rd Tank Army and participated in the Ostrogozhsk-Rossosh and Kharkov offensive operations, and then in the Kharkov defensive operation (the division was withdrawn from the battle and sent to the reserve for replenishment on March 14, 1943) . From March 30 to June 28, 1943, Lieutenant Colonel S.I. Polyansky temporarily served as division commander (at that time the division was engaged in combat training in the reserve near the city of Novy Oskol). In early July, the division was transferred to the 7th Guards Army on the Steppe Front. At the head of the regiment, he skillfully acted in the Battle of Kursk and in the Belgorod–Kharkov offensive operation. At the beginning of the Soviet offensive in early August, his regiment broke through the German defenses near Belgorod, and on August 23, 1943, the regiment was one of the first to break into Kharkov. In June–July 1943, the regiment of Lieutenant Colonel Polyansky destroyed and captured 43 artillery pieces, 96 machine guns, 8 mortar batteries, 2 tanks, 2 self-propelled guns, 24 vehicles and many other military equipment and weapons.

On September 3, 1943, Polyansky was seriously wounded in the battle near Kharkov. On September 10, 1943, he died from his wounds. He was buried in a mass grave of Soviet soldiers on the Alley of Heroes of the city cemetery No. 2 in Kharkov (Pushkin Street, 54).

== Awards ==
- Hero of the Soviet Union (04/07/1940)
- Order of Lenin (7.04.1940)
- Two orders of the Red Banner (01/11/1943 and 10/10/1943 - posthumously).

== Memory ==
- Honorary citizen of the city of Novograd-Volynsky.
- In the city of Merefa, Kharkiv region, a memorial plaque was erected.
- Streets in the cities of Novograd-Volynsky and Kharkov are named after Polyansky.

== Books ==
- Shkadov, Ivan, ed. (1988). Герои Советского Союза: краткий биографический словарь [Heroes of the Soviet Union: A Brief Biographical Dictionary] (in Russian). Vol. 2. Moscow: Voenizdat. ISBN 5203005362.
- Team of authors, ed. (2014). Великая Отечественная: Комдивы. Военный биографический словарь. Командиры стрелковых, горнострелковых дивизий, крымских, полярных, петрозаводских дивизий, дивизий ребольского направления, истребительных дивизий. (Пивоваров – Яцун) [Great Patriotic War: Divisional Commanders. Military biographical dictionary. Commanders of rifle, mountain rifle divisions, Crimean, polar, Petrozavodsk divisions, divisions of the Rebol direction, fighter divisions. (Pivovarov - Yatsun)] (in Russian). Vol. 5. Moscow: Кучково поле. ISBN 978-5-9950-0457-8.
- Золотые звёзды Полесья [Golden Stars of Polissya] (in Russian). Kiev. 1985.
