= The Go (The Go album) =

Studio album by The Go
- Released: October 7, 2003
- Genre: Garage rock, garage punk
- Length: 53:57
- Label: Lizard King

The Go chronology
| Whatcha Doin' (1998) | The Go (2003) | Howl On the Haunted Beat You Ride (2007) |

Professional ratings
Review scores
| Source | Rating |
|---|---|
| Allmusic | link |

The Go is the second official studio album by the garage rock band The Go. Both "Blue Eyes Woman" and "Summer's Gonna Be My Girl" are featured in the 2006 remake of The Hills Have Eyes. The song "Come Back" was featured in the 2011 film Asylum Blackout. Other tracks from the album are featured in the television show My Name is Earl.

== Track listing ==
1. "Capricorn" – 2:49
2. "Ain't That Bad" – 2:18
3. "American Pig" – 3:21
4. "Come Back" – 4:20
5. "Blue Eyes Woman" – 3:01
6. "Summer's Gonna Be My Girl" – 3:41
7. "Hardened Heart Blues" – 4:28
8. "Games" – 3:49
9. "You Can Rock & Roll" – 3:22
10. "Hey Linda" – 2:43
11. "Growd Up Wrong" – 3:15
12. "He's Been Lying" – 5:11
13. "I Got It" – 11:39

== Personnel ==
- Robert "Bobby" Harlow – vocals, guitar
- John Krautner – vocals, bass
- Marc Fellis – drums
- Ken Tudrick – guitar
