= Get Outdoors Georgia =

American healthy lifestyle initiative

Get Outdoors Georgia, or "GO" Georgia, is an initiative created by the Parks, Recreation and Historic Sites Division of the Georgia Department of Natural Resources to promote family-friendly, nature-based and health-focused activities throughout the state. It addresses the growing epidemic of obesity. and its effect on the health of Georgia citizens.

Georgians' increasingly sedentary lifestyles and disconnection from nature are resulting in alarming health declines and a diminishing conservation ethic. Get Outdoors Georgia encourages citizens to take advantage of the state's diverse natural resources to get fit, lead healthier lives, bond with their families and curb the obesity epidemic.

== Program History ==
The GO Georgia initiative evolved out of the state's five-year recreation research and planning effort, the 2008 – 2013 Statewide Comprehensive Outdoor Recreation Plan (SCORP). The plan identifies health, fitness and livability of Georgia communities as a primary priority. Get Outdoors Georgia launched in July 2014 when Georgia Governor Sonny Perdue announced the GO Georgia program at a press conference at Skidaway Island State Park in Savannah and declared by proclamation that June is "Georgia Great Outdoors Month." He noted that almost every Georgia resident lives within an hour's drive of one of the 63 Georgia state parks or historic sites.

Activities such as biking, hiking and paddling clubs; specific healthy events and recreational activities throughout the state park system; the addition of a GO Georgia badge to the Junior Ranger Program; and a Library Loan ParkPass Program to make admission to state parks and historic sites accessible through local public libraries are major components of GO Georgia. In addition, a fun-loving gopher mascot2 encourages people to "go for" a walk, a hike or a day in the park.

== Online Support Program ==
The program's website was designed as a primary tool to encourage Georgians to participate in the Get Outdoors Georgia program by allowing them to search by activities that appeal to them. This functionality, which incorporates Google Maps, works in tandem with landing pages that target activity clusters with specific passions, such as camping, hiking, mountain biking, family vacation ideas and more. The result is effectively increasing the likelihood that a visit to the site will lead to a visit to the park and ultimately to a positive impact on health.

== The Epidemic of Obesity ==
In 2000, the Office of the Surgeon General reported that obesity costs the nation approximately 117 billion dollars a year. 61% of adults in the United States were overweight or obese (body mass index greater than 25). 300,000 deaths each year in the United States are attributed to obesity.

The State of Georgia ranks 14th in adult obesity and 12th in the number of overweight children.

== GA SCORP Survey Data ==
Separate surveys conducted in January 2007 and 2008 as part of Georgia's Statewide Comprehensive Outdoor Recreation Plan identified both problems and opportunities.

- Over 1.8 million Georgians are severely overweight. This costs Georgia $2.1 billion in medical costs each year.
- Children are most at risk, with structured lives, fewer opportunities to play outdoors and less physical activity.
- As outdoor recreation opportunities shrink, the waistlines of Georgia's children continue to expand.
- Georgians overwhelmingly support public outdoor recreation in the state of Georgia with 88% indicating that they think public funds should be spent on creating outdoor recreation opportunities in Georgia.

== See also ==
- Childhood obesity
- List of Georgia State Parks
- Sonny Perdue
