= Starye Sharashli =

Starye Sharashli Старые Шарашли
- Selo
- Location within Bashkortostan Location within Russia
- Coordinates: 55°13′N 53°45′E
- Country: Russia
- Region: Bashkortostan
- District: Bakalinsky District
- Time zone: UTC+5:00

Starye Sharashli (Russian: Старые Шарашли; Bashkir: Иҫке Шәрәшле, İśke Şäräşle) is a rural locality (a selo) and the administrative centre of Starosharashlinsky Selsoviet, Bakalinsky District, Bashkortostan, Russia. The population was 410 as of 2010. There are 3 streets.

== Geography ==
Starye Sharashli is located 6 km north of Bakaly (the district's administrative centre) by road. Georgiyevka is the nearest rural locality.
