= The Go =

American rock band from Detroit

- Origin: Detroit, Michigan, U.S.
- Genres: Garage rock; neo-psychedelia; garage punk
- Years active: 1996–2013
- Labels: Sub Pop; Lizard King; Cass; Italy; Burger Records
- Past members: Bobby Harlow; John Krautner; Marc Fellis; Dave Buick; Jack White; Dion Fischer; Steve Nawara; Kenny Tudrick; James McConnell; Johnny Lzr; "Magic" Jake Culkowski; Justin Walker; Ben Luckett

The Go were an American rock band from Detroit, Michigan. Formed in 1996 by Bobby Harlow, John Krautner, and Marc Fellis, the band became associated with Detroit's late-1990s garage rock revival and released records through labels including Sub Pop, Lizard King Records, Cass Records, Italy Records, and Burger Records.

The group initially attracted attention after signing with Sub Pop in 1998. Their debut album, Whatcha Doin (1999), featured guitarist Jack White, who subsequently left the band and formed The White Stripes. The Go subsequently pursued a more experimental sound on Free Electricity, followed by the self-titled The Go (2003), Howl on the Haunted Beat You Ride (2007), and Tracking the Trail of the Haunted Beat (2008).

After several years of activity and personnel changes, the band released Fiesta in 2013, which was promoted as their final album.

== History ==
=== 1996–1999: Formation and Whatcha Doin ===
The Go were formed in Detroit in 1996 by Bobby Harlow, John Krautner, and Marc Fellis. The group developed within Detroit's rock scene and became regular performers at venues including the Gold Dollar. According to accounts of the band's early history, their first Detroit performances preceded their signing to Sub Pop in 1998.

The band worked with producer Matthew Smith of Outrageous Cherry, who produced their early recordings. Sub Pop subsequently signed the group in 1998 after the label's A&R representative Dan Trager saw the band perform in Detroit.

The Go's debut album, Whatcha Doin'', was released by Sub Pop on September 7, 1999. The album featured Dave Buick on bass and Jack White on guitar. White's contributions included guitar and songwriting on selected tracks, while Harlow and Krautner were responsible for most of the album's songwriting.

Whatcha Doin' was characterized by critics as a raw Detroit garage-rock record drawing on 1960s garage rock, glam rock, rhythm and blues, and early rock and roll. The band toured extensively in the United States following its release.

=== 2000–2002: Free Electricity ===
Following the release of Whatcha Doin', White left the group. The Go returned to the studio in 2000 to record a second album, Free Electricity, with a substantially different lineup and musical approach.

The sessions featured Dion Fischer on lead guitar, with contributions from John Olson of Wolf Eyes on saxophone and Cary Loren of Destroy All Monsters on tamboura.

The album departed significantly from the straightforward garage-rock sound of the band's debut, incorporating more experimental and improvisational elements. Sub Pop did not initially release the completed record, and Free Electricity subsequently became known as a "lost" or unreleased Go album.

For many years the album circulated outside the band's official discography. In September 2026, Sub Pop officially issued Free Electricity, decades after the original recordings were made.

=== 2003–2006: The Go and the Lizard King period ===
Following further personnel changes, including the departures of Buick and Fischer and the addition of guitarist Kenny Tudrick, The Go signed with British independent label Lizard King Records.

The band's self-titled album, The Go, was recorded in England and released in 2003. The album was produced by Bobby Harlow and Martin Heath and featured Harlow, Krautner, Fellis, and Tudrick.

The Go supported the album by touring with the White Stripes during their 2003 Elephant tour. White, who had previously been a member of The Go, was by then the frontman of the White Stripes.

Despite the tour, the album received limited promotion in the United States, and The Go subsequently left Lizard King. James McConnell later joined the band on guitar.

=== 2007–2009: Howl on the Haunted Beat You Ride ===
The Go returned with Howl on the Haunted Beat You Ride, released in 2007 through Cass Records. Bobby Harlow produced the album, which combined the band's garage-rock foundation with elements of psychedelia and power pop.

The album received favorable reviews and was regarded as a significant release in the band's catalog. Pitchfork described it as a record informed by power-pop and psychedelia, while Apple Music noted its deliberately vintage production and songwriting.

The Go subsequently released Tracking the Trail of the Haunted Beat, a collection of demos, alternate recordings, and outtakes from the Howl on the Haunted Beat You Ride sessions. The collection was issued through Bellyache Records in 2008.

=== 2010–2013: Conspiracy of Owls and Fiesta ===
During this period, Harlow, Krautner, and Fellis also worked under the name Conspiracy of Owls. The project released a self-titled album through Burger Records in 2010.

The album featured songwriting by Harlow and Krautner and production by Harlow. The project incorporated other Detroit musicians and became a parallel outlet for members of The Go.

The Go returned to their own name for Fiesta, released in 2013 by Burger Records in the United States and Mauvaise Foi Records in France. The album contains 20 tracks and was presented by Burger Records as the band's final record.

Fiesta was subsequently included by Pitchfork contributor Shake Appeal in a 2013 year-end selection of notable releases.

The Go became inactive after the release of Fiesta, bringing their principal period of activity to an end in 2013.

=== 2016: Live at the Gold Dollar ===
In 2016, Third Man Records released Live at the Gold Dollar, a live recording made by The Go on November 25, 1998, shortly before the band signed with Sub Pop.

The recording documents the early lineup of Harlow, Krautner, Fellis, Dave Buick, and Jack White. Third Man described the performance as a rare surviving document of the band's early live sound.

== Musical style ==
The Go's music has been associated with Detroit's garage-rock revival, while their recordings incorporated elements of garage punk, psychedelic rock, glam rock, rhythm and blues, and power pop.

Their early work, particularly Whatcha Doin', was characterized by a raw, guitar-driven sound rooted in 1960s garage rock and Detroit rock traditions. Later releases such as Free Electricity and Howl on the Haunted Beat You Ride demonstrated a broader range of psychedelic and experimental influences.

== Members ==
=== Final lineup ===
- Bobby Harlow – vocals, guitar, bass, keyboards
- John Krautner – vocals, guitar, bass
- Marc Fellis – drums

=== Former members ===
- Dave Buick – bass
- Jack White – guitar, vocals
- Dion Fischer – guitar
- Steve Nawara – bass
- Kenny Tudrick – guitar
- James McConnell – guitar, vocals
- Johnny Lzr – keyboards
- "Magic" Jake Culkowski – bass
- Justin Walker – guitar
- Ben Luckett – drums

== Discography ==
=== Studio albums ===
- Whatcha Doin (1999)
- The Go (2003)
- Howl on the Haunted Beat You Ride (2007)
- Fiesta (2013)
- Free Electricity (2026)

Live

- Live at the Gold Dollar (2016)
