= Aleksandr Pomazunov =

- Александр Иванович Помазунов
- Born: Aleksandr Ivanovich Pomazunov; 25 August [O.S. 12 August] 1915; Verkhniy Saltiv, Volchansky Uyezd, Kharkov Governorate, Russian Empire
- Died: 12 May 1991 (aged 75); Kyiv, Ukrainian SSR, Soviet Union
- Military career
- Allegiance: Soviet Union
- Branch: Soviet Air Force
- Service years: 1936–1946
- Rank: Guard Major
- Conflicts: World War II
- Awards: Hero of the Soviet Union

Aleksandr Ivanovich Pomazunov (Russian: Александр Иванович Помазунов; 25 August [O.S. 12 August] 1915 – 12 May 1991) was a Soviet military aviation navigator. He participated in the Battles of Khalkhin Gol, and the Second World War. He was awarded the title of Hero of the Soviet Union in 1945, and had the rank of Guard Major.

== Biography ==
Aleksandr Ivanovich Pomazunov was born on 25 August [O.S. 12 August] 1915 in the village of Verkhniy Saltiv, in what was then Volchansky Uyezd, Kharkov Governorate, in the Russian Empire. He was born into a poor peasant family, the son of Ivan Maksimovich and Aksenya Savelyevna Pomazunovs. He was of Ukrainian nationality. In 1916, the Pomazunov family moved to the Donbass, to the city of Brianka, where Aleksandr Pomazunov's parents got a job at the Krasnopolye mine. In 1919, the red partisan Ivan Maksimovich Pomazunov died in battle with the White Guard near the city of Luhansk. In 1920, the mother took the young Sasha to the village of Revolyutsionnoye, Vovchansk Raion. There she remarried, leaving her son to be raised by her brother Taras Savelyevich Perepelitsa. In 1931, Pomazunov graduated from seven classes of an incomplete secondary school in the village of Rubizhne and left for Bryanka, where he entered the mining and industrial school. But he did not like the profession of a miner. After graduating from a technical school in 1934, he entered the Kharkov State Pedagogical Institute. After three years of study, Pomazunov returned to the village Verkhniy Saltov in May 1936 and worked as a physical education instructor at the local district council of physical education before being drafted into military service.

Pomazunov was drafted into the Red Army on special recruitment in October 1936 and sent to the Stalin Yeysk Naval Aviation School. After graduating in December 1937, Pomazunov was assigned to the Vitebsk Light Bomber Aviation Brigade of the Byelorussian Special Military District as an observer pilot. In April 1938, junior lieutenant Pomazunov was sent to courses at the 3rd military school of pilots and pilot-observers, after which in September 1938 he was appointed to the position of assistant navigator of an aviation squadron of the 60th high-speed bomber regiment of the Kharkov Military District, which was based at the Lebedyn airfield. In May 1939, Pomazunov, as an assistant navigator of a separate squadron from the 60th bomber regiment, was sent on a special government mission to the Mongolian People's Republic, where he took part in the battles on the Khalkhin Gol River. He fought on the P-Z bomber. He was awarded the Order of the Red Banner. After the conclusion of a truce between the USSR and Japan, Pomazunov returned to his unit and was appointed to the post of navigator of an aviation squadron. In 1940 he graduated from the Poltava advanced training courses for navigators. In the spring of 1941, the 60th high-speed bomber regiment became part of the 49th bomber aviation division of the Kharkov Military District Air Force. Before the war, most of the regiment's pilots, including Lieutenant Pomazunov, were trained on Pe-2 bombers.

== The Great Patriotic War ==
At the beginning of the Great Patriotic War, Pomazunov was in the city of Lebedin. On 7 July 1941, the regiment in which Lieutenant Pomazunov served was redeployed to the Mogilev Region of the Byelorussian Soviet Socialist Republic at the Klimovichi airfield and on July 10 joined the battles as part of the 11th Mixed Aviation Division of the Air Force of the 3rd Army of the Western Front. The task of the regiment was to bomb the columns of the advancing German troops and destroy the crossings. On 13 July 1941, a group of 4 Pe-2s, whose lead navigator was Lieutenant Pomazunov, flew out to destroy the crossing across the Dnieper near the city of Shklow. When approaching the target, the group was met with dense barrage fire. Alexander Ivanovich was wounded by shell fragments in the arm and leg, but was able to bring the bombers to the target. The crossing was destroyed by a direct hit, which delayed the advance of the Germans for several hours. When returning to their airfield, the Pe-2 group was attacked by enemy fighters. Pomazunov took possession of a machine gun and shot down one Messerschmitt Bf 109, but his plane was also set on fire, and the pilot was mortally wounded. Pomazunov took control of the plane, brought the burning plane out of the dive and reached the Soviet territory, where he and the gunner-radio operator were able to use parachutes. Pomazunov was seriously wounded and lost a lot of blood. He was taken to the hospital and was treated until September 1941.

After recovering, Lieutenant Pomazunov was assigned to the post of navigator of an aviation squadron in the 603rd short-range bomber regiment of the 43rd Mixed Aviation Division of the Western Front Air Force. Soon he was promoted to senior lieutenant and appointed navigator of the regiment. Participated in the battle for Moscow. He made more than 10 sorties to bombard concentrations of enemy troops in the areas of Balabanovo, Maloyaroslavets, Mozhaysk, Vyazma, and Tula. During this period, the flights of the Soviet bomber aviation took place in the conditions of the total superiority of German aviation in the air and, as a rule, without fighter cover. Nevertheless, the Soviet air force, despite heavy losses, carried out the assigned tasks. On 22 October 1941, Senior Lieutenant Pomazunov was the lead navigator of a group of three Pe-2s that flew out to bombard a German tank column. When approaching the target, the bombers came under dense anti-aircraft fire, they were attacked by German fighters. Pomazunov's plane was hit by a direct hit of a projectile in the console fuel tanks and caught fire. Nevertheless, the crew continued to carry out the combat mission. Pomazunov shot down an enemy Bf 109 in an air battle, brought the plane to the target and destroyed 5 tanks with a bomb attack. The pilots landed the burning Pe-2 in no man's land. In total, for the period from 21 October to 14 November 1941, thanks to the accurate bombing of navigator Pomazunov, 25 vehicles with infantry, 7 tanks, and 2 artillery batteries were destroyed. Enemy losses in manpower amounted to two companies.

After the defeat of the Nazis near Moscow, Senior Lieutenant Pomazunov took part in the battle for Rzhev until December 1942. The 603rd short-range bomber regiment operated directly under the commander of the Air Force of the Western Front and during the First Rzhev-Sychev operation performed combat missions in the interests of the Western Front. In October 1942, Pomazunov received another military rank of captain of aviation and was transferred to the position of assistant chief navigator of the newly formed 2nd Bomber Aviation Corps. On 1 December 1942, the corps was included in the 16th Air Army. On the Don Front, as part of the corps, Captain Pomazunov participated in the Battle of Stalingrad, and on the North Caucasus Front, in the Battle for the Caucasus. On 7 May 1943 Pomazunov was awarded the rank of major. In June of the same year, he was appointed assistant chief navigator for radio navigation of the 1st Bomber Aviation Corps of the 2nd Air Army of the Voronezh Front. The corps took part in the Battle of Kursk. In early August, the corps was transferred to the 5th Air Army and supported the actions of the units of the Steppe (from 20 October 1943 - the 2nd Ukrainian) Front during the Belgorod-Kharkov operation, the Battle of the Dnieper and the Zhytomyr-Berdichev operation.

In February 1944, Major Pomazunov was sent to the headquarters of the 1st Guards Bomber Aviation Division of the 2nd Guards Bomber Aviation Corps of the 5th Air Army of the 2nd Ukrainian Front and was appointed senior navigator of the division. In this position, Pomazunov fought until the end of the war. Until the summer of 1944, he took part in all operations of the 2nd Ukrainian Front, carried out as part of the Dnieper-Carpathian offensive operation (Kirovograd, Korsun-Shevchenkovsky and Uman-Botoshansky operations). On 6 July 1944, the 2nd Guards Bomber Aviation Corps was transferred to the Lviv direction and included in the 2nd Air Army of the 1st Ukrainian Front. During the Lvov-Sandomierz operation of the guard, Major Pomazunov, as the lead navigator, repeatedly led groups of bombers from 18 to 50 aircraft to destroy enemy troop concentrations and its military infrastructure. So on 15 July 1944, a group of 81 Pe-2 bombers, the leading navigator of which was Major Pomazunov, despite strong anti-aircraft fire and fighter opposition, dealt a crushing blow to the accumulation of enemy military equipment in the village of Pomorzhany, destroying 8 tanks, 42 vehicles, 3 large ammunition depots, 7 bunkers, 3 artillery batteries and destroying 32 buildings. On July 22, 1944, a group of 34 Pe-2s attacked a concentration of military echelons and enemy troops at Horodok station. As a result of the strike, 50 wagons with manpower and cargo, 5 tanks, 25 vehicles, and 12 buildings were destroyed. The crews that especially distinguished themselves during the raid, including the crew of the guard colonel Fyodor Dobysh, whose navigator was Major Pomazunov, were thanked by the corps commander and presented with commemorative photographic certificates. In August 1944, Pomazunov participated in the Iasi-Kishinev operation, during which units of the 1st Guards Bomber Division assisted the troops of the 2nd Ukrainian Front during the liberation of the city of Iași.

In the last year of the Great Patriotic War, the senior navigator of the 1st Guards Bomber Aviation Division of the 6th Guards Aviation Corps of the 2nd Air Army of the 1st Ukrainian Guards Front Major Pomazunov participated in the Sandomierz-Silesian, Lower Silesian, Upper Silesian, and Berlin operations, the storming of Berlin. He ended the war in Czechoslovakia during the Prague operation. Pomazunov repeatedly, as a leading navigator, personally led large formations of bombers numbering from 18 to 50 aircraft on the most difficult missions. In any weather conditions, he led the groups exactly to the target. Participated in the liberation of Kraków and Częstochowa, contributed to the crossing of the Vistula and Oder by ground units. During his tenure as the division's senior navigator from February 1944 until the end of the war, the regiments of the division made 4,645 sorties, during which 58 tanks, 620 vehicles, 12 railway echelons, 8 artillery batteries, 520 wagons with goods were destroyed and damaged. 42 aircraft at airfields. Enemy losses in manpower amounted to about 3,000 soldiers and officers. Three regiments of the division were awarded honorary titles, and the division itself was awarded the Order of the Red Banner and the Order of Bogdan Khmelnitsky II degree. Guard Major Pomazunov himself made 136 sorties during the war. In 9 unequal air battles, he shot down 3 enemy aircraft (2 Bf 109 and 1 Messerschmitt Bf 110). Pomazunov showed merit in the training of navigators. In 1944, he prepared 26 young pilots for combat work. Thanks to the work of Pomazunov, the navigators of the division demonstrated high combat skills, most of the navigators became snipers for bombing strikes. By decree of the Presidium of the Supreme Soviet of the USSR, for the exemplary performance of command assignments on the front of the struggle against the German invaders and the valor and courage shown at the same time, Major Aleksandr Ivanovich Pomazunov was awarded the title of Hero of the Soviet Union on 27 June 1945 with the award of the Order of Lenin and the Gold Star medal (No. 7978).

== After the war ==
After the end of World War II, Pomazunov continued to serve in the Soviet Air Forces until 1946. After being transferred to the reserve, Pomazunov remained to work in aviation. He was a test navigator in the aviation industry. For testing new transport aircraft, he was awarded the Order of the Red Banner of Labour. Then Pomazunov worked at the M. V. Frunze Central Aerodrome as a flight controller and air traffic controller. After his retirement he moved to Kyiv. Pomazunov died on 12 May 1991. He was buried in Kyiv at the Berkovets Cemetery.

== Awards ==
- Hero of the Soviet Union (27.06.1945)
- Order of Lenin (27.06.1945)
- Two Orders of the Red Banner (01.12.1939; 12.05.1945)
- Two Orders of the Patriotic War, 1st class (17.08.1944; 1985)
- Order of the Red Banner of Labour
- Order of the Red Star (04.12.1941)
- Medal "For the Defence of Stalingrad" (December 1942)

== Books ==
- Shkadov, Ivan, ed. (1988). Герои Советского Союза: краткий биографический словарь [Heroes of the Soviet Union: A Brief Biographical Dictionary] (in Russian). Vol. 2. Moscow: Voenizdat. ISBN 5203005362.
