= Global Oncology =

U.S.-based global health organization

Global Oncology (GO) is an American 501(c)(3) community-based global health organization. The organization was initially established at Harvard University in 2012 and now operates out of the Bay Area.

== Background ==
Global Oncology was founded in 2012, by Drs. Ami S. Bhatt and Franklin W. Huang when they were oncology fellows at Harvard and are now faculty at Stanford and UCSF, respectively. The organization is composed of physicians, staff, students, and members of the oncology community and other skilled professional volunteers. The mission of the organization is to improve cancer care and research in resource-limited settings through a variety of programs and efforts, including the development of training and research opportunities in global oncology. The organization collaborates with other leading organizations working in global oncology and cancer care.

The steering committee that advises the organization is composed of academic and faculty experts in cancer care and oncology drawn from Harvard-affiliated institutions and hospitals, including Harvard Medical School, Harvard School of Public Health, Beth Israel Deaconess Medical Center, Brigham and Women's Hospital, Children's Hospital Boston, Dana–Farber Cancer Institute, and Massachusetts General Hospital.

== Programming ==
An initial primary effort of GO was to raise awareness of cancer in resource-constrained settings through the GO! Talks, a bi-monthly Global Oncology seminar series that sought to educate the larger community on global oncology issues and catalyze collaborations in the field. Speakers included Paul Farmer and Eric Krakauer.

Global Oncology developed a first-of-its-kind Global Oncology Map that launched in 2015 as a resource for the global cancer community to identify projects and needs in global cancer work.

The organization also developed "Cancer and You", a booklet of cancer educational materials designed specifically for cancer patients in resource-constrained settings and has been translated into over a dozen languages.

Global Oncology designed and distributed the first comic book in Nigeria aimed at educating youth on cervical cancer and the HPV vaccine and also developed an animated comic with it.

The organization helped launch Belize's first public oncology treatment program based at Karl Heusner Memorial Hospital in Belize City, Belize.
