= Gossaum =

Traditional Korean sport

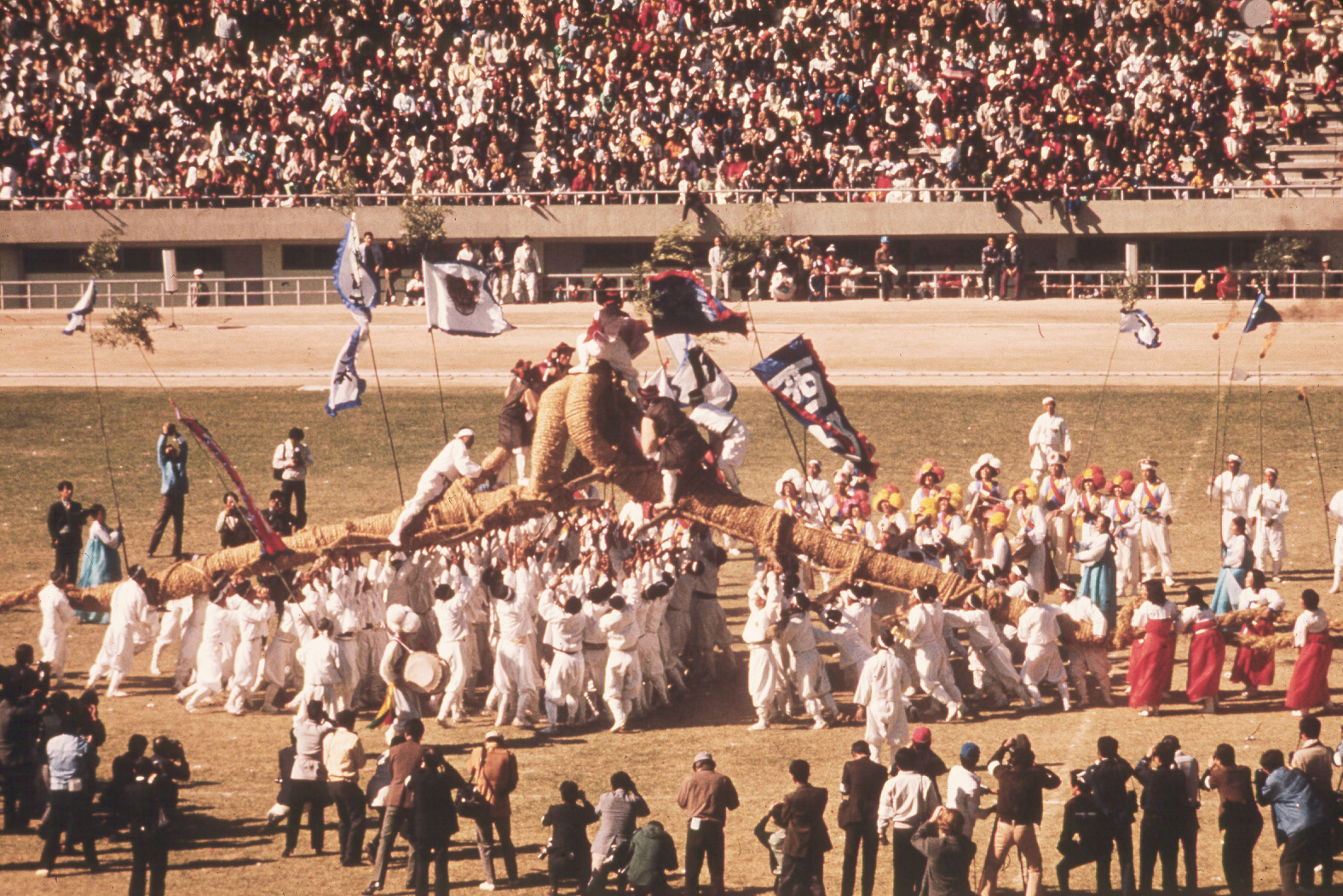
A scene from a game of Gossaum in 1989

Gossaum (Korean: 고싸움) is a traditional Korean sport played in Chilseok village, Nam-gu as part of the New Year's celebrations. It is designated an Important Intangible Cultural Property. It is played by two teams, each of which carries a Go, a large, braided straw structure. The objective is for one team to drive the other's Go to the ground. The name is derived from "go" ("loop", literally, the looped knot of a coat string) and "sseum" ("fight"). In 2002 the game was commemorated on a postage stamp.

== Setup ==
=== Go ===
Each Go is around 15m long, and consists of a large straw loop at the end of a long, thick cylinder, supported on poles. Two "tails", at the opposite end of the structure from the loop, serve to provide a rudimentary steering mechanism. During play, the two Go are lifted above head height by the teams, and the loops are brought into contact and pushed against one another. Due to the ritual nature of the contest, one team's goal is larger than the other, making the contest somewhat one-sided.

=== Teams ===
The teams are designated Dongbu ("East") and Seobu ("West"), and wear blue and red respectively. Each team consists of around 70-80 people; including the Julpaejang or leader, who sits astride the Go and directs his team; the Gomen-saram or carriers, who lift the Go; and the Kkorijul-jabi or tail-holders (predominantly women) who steer the Go using its two tails. Each team also has a number of standby players who sing and shout chants of encouragement to the players.

== Gameplay ==
At the command of the julpaejang the teams rush forward and ram the loops of their two Go against one another, attempting to drive the opposing team back or push its Go to the ground. If, after pushing, neither Go is dislodged, one of the julpaejang will give the order to retreat and the two Gos will separate before repeating the process. During such separations, the gomen-saram will raise and lower the Go to demonstrate their fighting spirit.

When one Go has been brought down four times, the game is over.

== Gossaumnori ==
Gossaum plays the central role in the Gossaumnori festival. Other aspects of this fertility rite include prayers to the spirits of the local mountains and forests, exorcism rite, and traditional music and dancing. Because the Western side of the village is thought to represent fecundity, the Seobu Go is larger than the Dongbu one, since only if Seobu win will the villager's prayers for a prosperous year be granted. Historically, in the event that no clear winner emerged, the Go would be dismantled and their straw ropes used in a tug-of-war contest instead.
