= Nikolai Pasko =

Soviet pilot (1918–1982)

- Николай Фёдорович Пасько
- Born: Nikolai Fyodorovich Pasko; 12 December 1918; Skrypai, Zmiiv Raion, Kharkiv Oblast
- Died: 16 July 1982 (aged 63); Kharkiv, Ukrainian SSR
- Military career
- Allegiance: Soviet Union
- Branch: Soviet Air Force
- Service years: 1939–1956
- Rank: Colonel
- Conflicts: World War II; Korean War
- Awards: Hero of the Soviet Union

Nikolai Fyodorovich Pasko (Russian: Николай Фёдорович Пасько; 12 December 1918 - 16 July 1982) was a pilot officer and flying ace of the Soviet Air Force, and a colonel of the Soviet Army. He served during the Second World War and Korean Wars, and was awarded the title of Hero of the Soviet Union in 1945.

== Biography ==
Nikolai Pasko was born on 12 December 1918 in the village of Skrypai (now in Kharkiv Oblast, Ukraine). After graduating from seven classes of school, he worked as a mechanic at a factory. He studied at the flying club, graduated from the school of instructor pilots. In December 1939, Pasko was called up for service in the Red Army. In 1940, he graduated from the Kachin Military Aviation Pilot School. Member of the CPSU (b) party since 1942. Since October 1942 he participated in the battles of the Great Patriotic War.

In March 1945, Senior Lieutenant Nikolai Pasko commanded a squadron of the 28th Guards Fighter Aviation Regiment of the 5th Guards Fighter Aviation Division of the 11th Fighter Air Corps of the 3rd Air Army of the 3rd Belorussian Front. By that time, he had made 265 sorties, took part in 32 air battles, shot down 15 enemy aircraft, and inflicted heavy losses on the enemy during air raids.

By decree of the Presidium of the Supreme Soviet of the Soviet Union of 18 August 1945, for "the courage and heroism shown, downing 15 enemy planes" Guard Lieutenant Nikolai Pasko was awarded the title of Hero of the Soviet Union with the Order of Lenin and the Gold Star medal number 8892.

After the end of the war, Pasko continued to serve in the Soviet Army. Participated in the battles of the Korean War as commander of the 67th Fighter Aviation Regiment (piloting the MIG-15 aircraft). He did not win in air battles. In December 1950, Pasko's regiment was transferred to mainland China, where Pasko trained North Korean and Chinese pilots to fly the MIG-15. In 1953 he graduated from the Higher tactical flight courses. In 1956, with the rank of colonel, Pasko was transferred to the reserve. He lived and worked first in his native village, where he was elected chairman of the collective farm, then in Kharkiv. He died on 16 July 1982, was buried at the Kharkov city cemetery No. 4.

He was awarded the Order of Lenin, three Orders of the Red Banner, the Order of the Red Star, the Orders of the Patriotic War of the 1st degree and the Red Star, a number of medals (“For the Capture of Koenigsberg”, “For Military Merit”, etc.).

== Books ==
- Shkadov, Ivan, ed. (1988). Герои Советского Союза: краткий биографический словарь [Heroes of the Soviet Union: A Brief Biographical Dictionary] (in Russian). Vol. 2. Moscow: Voenizdat. ISBN 5203005362.
- Дриго, С. В., ed. (1984). За подвигом — подвиг [For a feat - a feat] (in Russian). Калининград: Калининградское кн.изд.
- Подвиги во имя Отчизны [Feats in the name of the Fatherland] (in Russian). Харьков: Прапор. 1985.
- Сейдов, И. А., ed. (2007). Красные дьяволы» в небе Кореи [Red Devils in the sky of Korea] (in Russian). Москва.
