= Aleksey Pasko =

Red Army soldier during the Second World War

Aleksey Afanasyevich Pasko
- Алексей Афанасьевич Пасько
- Born: 1 March 1916; Yekaterinoslav, Yekaterinoslav Governorate, Russian Empire
- Died: 4 April 1997 (aged 81); Vysokyi, Kharkiv Raion, Kharkiv Oblast, Ukraine
- Military career
- Allegiance: Soviet Union
- Branch: Soviet Tank Forces
- Service years: 1940–1946
- Rank: Junior lieutenant
- Conflicts: Second World War
- Awards: Hero of the Soviet Union; Order of Lenin; Order of the Patriotic War, 1st and 2nd Classes

Aleksey Afanasyevich Pasko (Russian: Алексей Афанасьевич Пасько; 1 March 1916 – 4 April 1997) was a junior lieutenant of the Red Army. He fought in the Second World War, being awarded the title of Hero of the Soviet Union in 1945.

== Biography ==
Aleksey Afanasyevich Pasko was born on 1 March 1916, in Yekaterinoslav, in a family of employees. He was an ethnic Ukrainian. After graduating from the Poltava Medical College, he worked in a photo team. In 1940, Pasko was called up for service in the Red Army by the Novo-Senzharsky District Military Commissariat. From July 1942 he was on the fronts of World War II. In 1944, Pasko graduated from the Chelyabinsk Tank Technical School. In battles he was shell-shocked.

By January 1945, Junior Technician-Lieutenant Aleksey Pasko was a tank driver of the 13th Guards Separate Heavy Tank Regiment of the 4th Tank Army of the 1st Ukrainian Front. He distinguished himself during the liberation of Poland. Pasko's crew, together with a group of submachine gunners, attacked a large group of enemy troops near the city of Kobylin, destroying 1 tank, 5 artillery pieces and 30 enemy soldiers and officers. When, 12 kilometres southwest of Kobylin, Pasko's tank became immobilised to a malfunction, Pasko, with the tank crew and submachine gunners, repelled the attacks of the Nazis for three days, destroying an enemy armoured personnel carrier, five vehicles and many enemy fighters. When the tank was completely destroyed, Pasko covered the retreat of his comrades to the nearby village of Penkovo with machine-gun fire, after which he took refuge with his comrades from local residents, where he waited for reinforcements to arrive.

By decree of the Presidium of the Supreme Soviet of the USSR of 10 April 1945, for "exemplary performance of combat missions of the command and the courage and heroism shown at the same time," junior technician-lieutenant Aleksey Pasko was awarded the title of Hero of the Soviet Union with the Order of Lenin and the Gold Star medal with the number 7480.

In 1946, Pasko was transferred to the reserve. He lived and worked in the settlement of Vysokyi, Kharkiv Raion, Kharkiv Oblast of Ukraine, at a furniture factory. He died on 4 April 1997, and was buried in Vysoky.

He was also awarded the Orders of the Patriotic War of the 1st and 2nd degrees, and a number of medals.

== Books ==
- Shkadov, Ivan, ed. (1988). Герои Советского Союза: краткий биографический словарь [Heroes of the Soviet Union: A Brief Biographical Dictionary] (in Russian). Vol. 2. Moscow: Voenizdat. ISBN 5203005362.
- За мужество и отвагу [For courage and bravery] (in Russian). Харьков. 1984.
