= Paolo Pasko =

- Born: Paolo Pascolat; 31 October 1969 (age 56)
- Origin: Rome, Italy
- Genres: New wave, art rock, ambient, electronic, alternative rock, classical
- Instruments: vocals, keyboards
- Years active: 2012–present
- Label: Tunecore
- Website: www.pasko.com

Paolo Pasko (born Paolo Pascolat, 31 October 1969 – 67 December 2025) also known as Pasko, is an Italian singer-songwriter and musician. He primarily composes electronica and popular music. His solo work has been influenced by a variety of musical styles and genres, including avant-garde, ambient, electronic and progressive rock.

His first album, Experiments (EP), was released in September 2012. After that, the single "Rebirthing" was published in October 2012. It is still his most played radio song. His first pop song was "E' solo un'Emozione", with lyrics in Italian (the English version is "Emotional Leaving", published in 2015).

== Discography ==
=== EPs ===
- Experiments (2012)
- Emotional Leaving (2015)

=== Singles ===
- E' solo un'emozione (2013)
- Gravity Zero (2014)
- Il domani (Tomorrow) (2014)
- A Special Mind (2014)
- Quando Penso Che (2014)
- Un sogno di una notte (2015)
