= Nogo, Missouri =

- Former town
- Location within Missouri
- Country: United States
- State: Missouri
- County: Greene
- Elevation: 1,414 ft (431 m)
- Time zone: UTC-6 (Central (CST))
  - Summer (DST): UTC-5 (CDT)
- GNIS feature ID: 736375

Nogo (also Mulroy) is a former town in Greene County, Missouri, United States, on old U.S. Route 66. The site is now completely inside the city of Strafford.

The name derived from the inability to name the town and someone made the comment that it was "a no-go." The name "Nogo" then became the name of the town.
