= Zero Gravity Corporation =

American space entertainment and tourism company

- Type: Subsidiary
- Industry: Weightless flights
- Founded: 1993
- Founders: Peter Diamandis; Byron K. Lichtenberg; Ray Cronise
- Headquarters: Exploration Park, Florida, United States
- Website: gozerog.com

Zero Gravity Corporation (also known as Zero-G) is an American company based in Exploration Park, Florida, formerly of Fort Lauderdale, Florida, which operates weightless flights from United States airports. Zero-G was governed under Part 121 of FAA regulations. Zero-G was formerly operated by Everts Air Cargo. Everts revoked Zero-G's access to their certificate on August 18, 2025. It is unclear if or when Zero-G will recommence their flight operations.

== History ==
Founded by entrepreneur Peter Diamandis, astronaut Byron K. Lichtenberg, and NASA engineer Ray Cronise, the company has been operating weightless flights since 2004. Over 15000 were clients as of November 2017. A number of notable passengers have been on weightless flights run by the company, including Penn Jillette and Teller, Martha Stewart, Burt Rutan, Buzz Aldrin, Casey Neistat, John Carmack, and Tony Hawk. Theoretical physicist Stephen Hawking also completed a shortened flight on April 26, 2007.

In April 2006, Zero-G became the first commercial company to gain permission from the Kennedy Space Center to use its space shuttle runway and landing facilities. On April 21, 2007, it began regular flights from Las Vegas for the general public at ticket prices of US$3,675.

In March 2008, the company was acquired by Space Adventures.

On April 20, 2011, a Safety Approval was granted to Zero-G by the FAA which allows the company to "...offer reduced gravity parabolic flights to prospective suborbital launch operators to meet the applicable components of the crew qualification and training requirements outlined in the Code of Federal Regulations (14 C.F.R., Section 460.5)."

== Flight experience ==
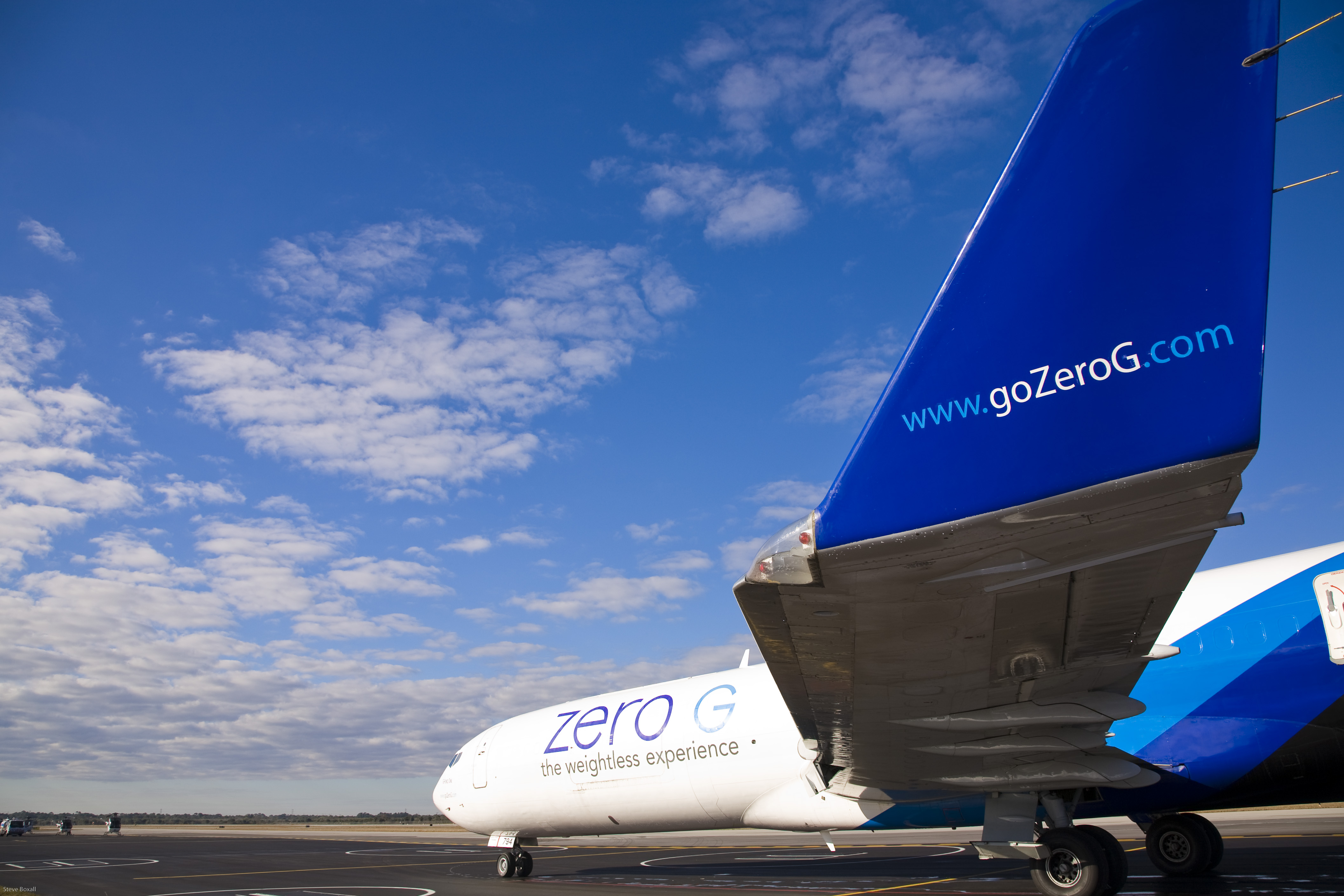
Zero Gravity "G-FORCE ONE" aircraft

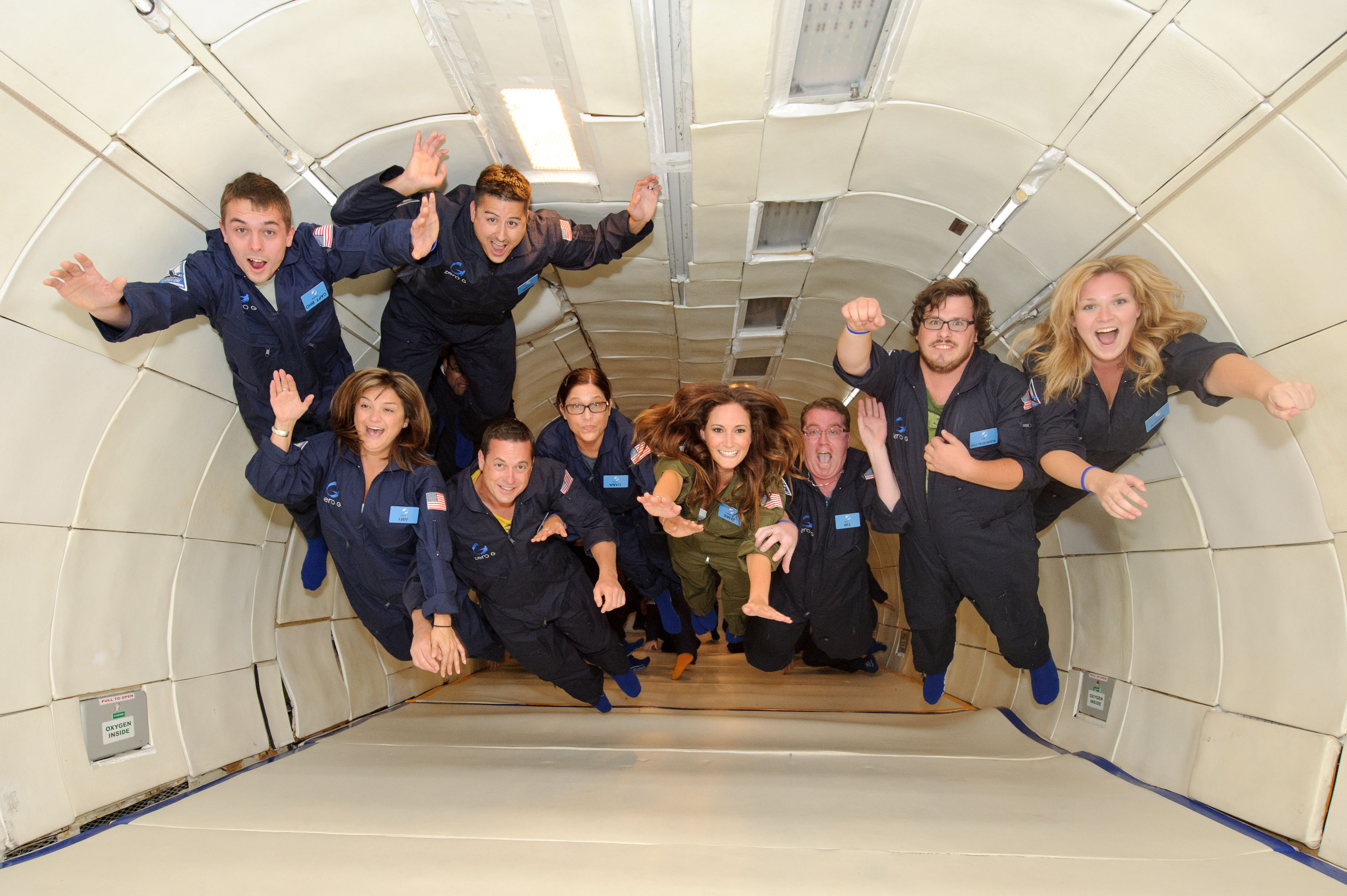
People in the reduced-gravity aircraft

As of June 2026, the price of a flight for a single passenger starts at US$8,900 (plus tax). The unique Weightless Weddings Experience is also included in the list of services Noah and Erin Fulmor were the first couple to get married in weightlessness.

Fliers undergo a brief training session before embarking. A flight lasts 90 to 100 minutes, and consists of fifteen parabolas, each of which simulates about 30 seconds of reduced gravity, including two that simulate Lunar gravity (one-sixth of Earth's). Each parabola begins with the aircraft climbing at a 45-degree angle at approximately 23,000 feet (7,000 m), peaks at 32,000 ft (9,800 m), and ends with the aircraft pointed down at a 30-degree angle.

== Fleet ==
The company owns and operates a Boeing 727-227F Advanced, registration N794AJ, dubbed "G-FORCE ONE". They fly parabolic arcs similar to those of NASA's KC-135 reduced gravity aircraft.

Zero-G's Weightless Lab research program provides access to low gravity environments for technological development, which have been used in biomedical and pharmaceutical research, fluid and fundamental physics, materials science, aerospace engineering, space exploration hardware and human space habitation.

== Research flights for NASA ==
NASA had a microgravity services contract with Zero-G, which provided the first flights under this contract on September 9 and 10, 2008. Flight time from Ellington Field near Johnson Space Center was provided for the FASTRACK Space Experiment Platform. The flights were funded by NASA's Strategic Capabilities and Assets Program.

== See also ==
- Reduced-gravity aircraft
