= Pascoal =

- Gender: masculine

Origin
- Origin: Latin
- Meaning: "associated with Passover (or Easter)"
- Region of origin: Portugal, Brazil and all the Portuguese speaking countries

Other names
- Related names: Pasquale, Pasqual, Pascual, Pascal, Paschal, Pascale, Pascalle, Paschalis, Pascalis, Pascoe, Pasco

Pascoal is a masculine given name and a surname in Portuguese language. It is the Portuguese form of the name Pascal (French, English), Pascual (Spanish), Pasquale (Italian), Pasqual (Catalan, Venetian).

Pascoal derives from the Latin paschalis or pashalis, which means "relating to Easter" from Latin pascha ("Easter"), Greek Πάσχα, Aramaic pasḥā, in turn from the Hebrew pesach, which means "to be born on, or to be associated with, Passover day". Since the Hebrew holiday Passover coincides closely with the later Christian holiday of Easter, the Latin word came to be used for both occasions. Notable people with the name include:

== Surname ==
- Cláudia Pascoal (born 1994), Portuguese singer and songwriter
- Cristiano Pascoal (born 1992), Portuguese football player
- Hermeto Pascoal (1936–2025), Brazilian composer and multi-instrumentalist
- Hildebrando Pascoal (born 1952), Brazilian politician and former colonel of Acre State's Military Police
- José Pascoal Jr. (born 1988), Brazilian racing cyclist
- Otiniel Pascoal (born 1995), Angolan handball player
- Pocas Pascoal (born 1963), Angolan film director
- Rafael Pascoal (born 1990), Brazilian football player
- Stelvia Pascoal (born 2002), Angolan handball player

== Given name ==
- Pascoal Amorim (born 1995), Mozambican football player
- Pascoal Moreira Cabral Leme (c. 1654–1730), settler in colonial Brazil
- Pascoal de Chicalim (born 1970), Indian playwright, theatre director, theatrical producer, actor, and singer
- Ranieri Mazzilli (1910–1975), Brazilian politician
- Pascoal Mocumbi (born 1941), Prime Minister of Mozambique, 1994–2004

== See also ==
- Monte Pascoal, mount in the state of Bahia, Brazil
- Pascual (disambiguation)
- Pascal (disambiguation)
- Pasqual (disambiguation)
- Pasquale (disambiguation)
