= Pascalis =

Pascalis may refer to:

- Claudio De Pascalis (born 1982), Italian footballer
- Claude Kévers-Pascalis (1920–2016), Belgian writer, historian and engineer
- Pascalis Romanus (or Paschal the Roman), a 12th-century priest, medical expert, and dream theorist

== See also ==
- Paschalis (disambiguation)
- Pascali (disambiguation)
- Pascal (disambiguation)
- Pasqual (disambiguation)
- Pasquale (disambiguation)
- Pascual (disambiguation)
