= Pascali =

Pascali may refer to:

- Manuel Pascali (born 1981), Italian professional footballer
- Pino Pascali (1935–1968), Italian artist, sculptor, set designer and performer
- Pascali (grape), red Italian wine grape

== See also ==
- Pascali's Island (disambiguation)
- Paschalis (disambiguation)
- Pascal (disambiguation)
- Pasqual (disambiguation)
- Pasquale (disambiguation)
- Pascual (disambiguation)
- Pascale
