= Paskal (disambiguation) =

Paskal is a male given name.

Paskal may also refer to:

- Cleo Paskal, a geopolitics academic
- Naval Special Forces (Malaysia), called PASKAL, the abbreviation for Pasukan Khas Laut
- Paskal (film), a Malaysian war drama film inspired by the Naval Special Forces

== See also ==
- Pascal (disambiguation)
- Pascall (disambiguation)
- Paschal (disambiguation)
- Pascual (disambiguation)
- Pasqual (disambiguation)
- Pasquale (disambiguation)
