= Paschalis =

Paschalis may refer to:

- Mysterii Paschalis, a 1969 motu proprio published by Pope Paul VI
- Mericella paschalis, a species of sea snail
- Stratis Paschalis (born 1958), Greek poet, novelist and translator

== See also ==
- Pascal (disambiguation)
- Paschal (disambiguation)
- Pasquale (disambiguation)
- Pasqual (disambiguation)
- Pascual (disambiguation)
- Pascoe
- Pasco (disambiguation)
