= Pascal (given name) =

- Pronunciation: pahs-KALL
- Gender: unisex

Origin
- Origin: Latin
- Meaning: "associated with Easter (Passover)"

Other names
- Related names: Pascale; Pascalle; Paschal; Paskal; Pashk; Paschalis; Pascaline; Pasquale; Pascoale; Pascoal; Pasqual; Pascual; Pascoe; Pasco

Pascal is a unisex given name. It is a Francophone name, cognate of Italian name Pasquale, Spanish name Pascual, Catalan name Pasqual and Portuguese name Pascoal.

Pascal is common in French-speaking countries, Germany, Austria, and the Netherlands. Derived feminine forms include Pascale, Pascalle or Pascalina. Pascal is also common as a surname in France, and in Italy (in Piedmont, Aosta Valley and, as De Pascal, in Friuli-Venezia Giulia).

Pascal derives from the Latin paschalis or pashalis, which means "relating to Easter", from the Latin term for "Easter", pascha, Greek Πάσχα, from the Aramaic pasḥā (Hebrew pesach) "Passover" (since Passover coincides closely with the later Easter, the Latin word came to be used for both holidays). The Christian given name originally derives from the meaning "one born on Easter day", or "born on Pentecost" (see below).

Variations of the given name include: Paschal, Pasqual, Pasquale, Paskal, Pascoal, Pascale, Pascha, Paschalis, Pascual, Pascoe, and Pasco.

The name arises in the early medieval period, in Latin spelled Paschalis. An early bearer is Antipope Paschal (fl. 687), and Pope Paschal I (d. 824). A variant Latin form of the name is Paschasius; this is the name of the 9th-century Frankish saint Paschasius Radbertus. Peter Pascual (Petrus Paschasius, d. 1299) was a bishop and martyr of medieval Andalusia. Saint Pascal (or San Pasqual) refers to Paschal Baylon (1540–1592), a Spanish friar and mystic. Baylon was born on 24 May 1540 to Aragonese peasants. His parents named him Pasqual because he was born on the day of the feast of Pentecost (not Easter), because Pentecost in Spain was known as "the Pasch (or Passover) of the Holy Ghost" at the time. After Pascual Baylon's beatification (1618) and canonization (1690), it became common to give the name Pascal to children born on the feast day of Saint Pascal (17 May) rather than on Easter or Pentecost, or independently of the child's date of birth.

== People ==
- Pascal Arweiler (born 1992), German politician
- Pascal Bentoiu (1927–2016), Romanian modernist composer
- Pascal Brendel (born 2003), German artistic gymnast
- Pascal Broulis (born 1965), Swiss politician
- Pascal Caffet (born 1962), French pastry confectioner and chocolate maker¨
- Pascal Charbonneau (born 1983), Canadian chess Grandmaster and financial analyst
- Pascal Chimbonda (born 1979), French footballer
- Pascal Couchepin (born 1942), Swiss politician
- Pascal Covici (1885–1964), Romanian Jewish-American book publisher and editor
- Pascal Cygan (born 1974), French retired footballer
- Pascal Dozie (1939–2025), Nigerian entrepreneur and businessman
- Pascal Groß (born 1991), German professional footballer
- Pascal Grothe (born 1992), German politician
- Pascal Gygax (born 1974), Swiss psycholinguist
- Pascal Hervé (1964–2024), French cyclist
- Pascal Hitzler, German-American computer scientist
- Pascal Köpke (born 1995), German footballer
- Pascal Langdale (born 1973), English actor
- Pascal Lecamp (born 1958), French politician
- Pascal Leddin (born 1999), German politician
- Pascal Légitimus (born 1959), French actor, comedian and theatre director
- Pascal Msindo (born 2003), Tanzanian footballer
- Pascal Obispo (born 1965), French singer-songwriter
- Pascal Olmeta (born 1961), French former football goalkeeper
- Pascal Payet (born 1963), French murderer noted for his prison escapes
- Pascal Pia, French writer, journalist, illustrator and scholar born Pierre Durand (1903–1979)
- Pascal Renwick (1954-2006), French voice actor.
- Pascal Rheaume (born 1973), Canadian ice hockey player in the National Hockey League
- Pascal Robinson-Foster, better known as Bobby Vylan, a member of Bob Vylan
- Pascal Rogé (born 1951), French pianist
- Pascal Siakam (born 1994), Cameroonian basketball player in the National Basketball Association
- Pascal Soriot (born 1959), chief executive officer of the pharmaceutical company AstraZeneca
- Pascal Stenzel (born 1996), VFB Stuttgart player which played also in Borrussia Dortmund
- Pascal Struijk (born 1999), Dutch footballer
- Pascal Thévenot (born 1966), French politician
- Pascal Trépanier (born 1973), Canadian ice hockey player in the National Hockey League
- Pascal Vicedomini, founder and producer of the Ischia Global Film & Music Festival
- Pascal Vincent (born 1971), Canadian ice hockey head coach for the National Hockey League’s Columbus Blue Jackets
- Pascal Wehrlein (born 1994), German-Mauritian Formula E and Formula 1 driver.

== Fictional characters ==
- Pascal, a character from the action-role playing game Nier: Automata
- Pascal, a character from the action-role playing game Tales of Graces
- Pascal, Rapunzel's pet chameleon from the 2010 film Tangled
- Pascal Sauvage, a character from the spy comedy Johnny English
- Pascal Curious, a pre-made Sim from the social simulation game The Sims 2
- Pascal Abaj, a character from Shaman King
- Pascal, a sea otter NPC in the Animal Crossing series
- Pascal Biquet, character form the manga Kaze to Ki no Uta

== See also ==
- Pascal (surname)
- Pascal (disambiguation)
- Paschal (disambiguation)
- Pascha (disambiguation)
- Pasquale (disambiguation)
- Pasqual (disambiguation)
- Pascual (disambiguation)
- Pascoe
- Pasco (disambiguation)
