= Pasquali =

Pasquali may refer to:

== People ==
- Alberto Pasquali (1882–1929), Italian stage and film actor of the silent era
- Alfred-Adolphe Pasquali (1898-1991), French actor and theatre director
- Bella Pasquali (born 2006), Australian sprinter
- Bernice de Pasquali (1873–1925), American coloratura soprano singer and pianist
- Camillo Pasquali (1909–1956), Italian politician
- Ernesto Maria Pasquali (1883–1919), Italian pioneering film producer and director
- Filippo Pasquali (1651-1697), Italian painter of the Baroque period, mainly painting sacred subjects
- Francesca Pasquali (born 1980), Italian artist
- Giorgio Pasquali (1885–1952), Italian classical scholar
- Giovanni Battista Pasquali, a leading Italian printer in eighteenth-century
- Giovannuccio Pasquali (died 1471), Italian Roman Catholic Bishop of Nusco
- Ivan Paskvali (Cattaro 1586 - ? ), Catholic missionary who was in charge for Catholicization of Orthodox Serbs, first in Dalmatia and then in Montenegro and Serbia.
- Jacques Pasquali, actor in the 2016 French comedy film Raid dingue
- Johanna Pasquali, actress in the 2016 French comedy film Raid dingue
- Ludovico Pasquali (c.1500-1551), an Italian-language author
- Scipione Pasquali (died 1624), Italian Roman Catholic Bishop of Casale Monferrato
- Sebastian Pasquali, Australian footballer
- Tiziano Pasquali (born 1994), Italian rugby union footballer
- Vincenzo Pasquali (1871–1940), Italian sculptor

== See also ==
- Pascal (disambiguation)
- Pasqual (disambiguation)
- Pascual (disambiguation)
- Pasquale (disambiguation)
