= Pasqualini =

Pasqualini is a surname. Notable people with the surname include:

- Alessandro Pasqualini (1493–1559), Italian Renaissance architect
- Jean Pasqualini, French, Corsican and Chinese journalist
- Marc'Antonio Pasqualini (1614–1691), Italian castrato opera singer
- Lorenzo Pasqualini (born 1989), Italian footballer

== See also ==
- Pascal (disambiguation)
- Pasqual (disambiguation)
- Pascual (disambiguation)
- Pasquale (disambiguation)
