= Pascal Island =

Pascal Island may refer to:

- Pascal Island (Antarctica)
- Pascal Island (Western Australia)

== See also ==
- Pascal (disambiguation)
