= Pascall (surname) =

Pascall is a surname. Notable people with the surname include:

- Alex Pascall (born 1936), British broadcaster, journalist, musician, composer, oral historian and educator
- Beth Pascall (born 1987), British ultrarunner and paediatrician
- Brad Pascall (born 1970), Canadian ice hockey defenceman
- Geraldine Pascall (1944–1983), Australian journalist
- Jeremy Pascall (1946-2001), English screenwriter, broadcaster, journalist and author
- Victor Pascall (1886–1930), Trinidadian cricketer

== See also ==
- Pascal (disambiguation)
- Pascale, name
- Pascall Fox, Australian television presenter
- Pascall Roberts (1937–2011), Trinidadian cricketer
