= Paskoje =

Paskoje (Serbian Cyrillic: Паскоје) is a Serbo-Croatian masculine given name, derived from Latin Paschalis (Pascal, Pasquale), Slavicized with the ending -oje. Notable people with the name include:

- Paskoje Sorkočević
- Paskoje Miličević Mihov
- Paskoje Primojević
