= Pascall =

Pascall may refer to:

- Pascall (company), an Australian and New Zealand confectionery company
- Pascall Prize
- Pascall, another name for the Monica (grape)
- Pascall (surname)

== See also ==
- Pascal (disambiguation)
- Pascale, name
