= Pashko =

Pashko is a surname. Notable people with the surname include:

- Gramoz Pashko (1955–2006), Albanian economist and politician
- Josif Pashko (1918–1963), Albanian politician
- Walter Pashko (1930–2006), American painter

== See also ==
- Pasco (disambiguation)
- Pasko (disambiguation)
