= Pasko =

Pasko may refer to:

- Pasko (name)
- The common name for the Christmas in the Philippines
  - Pasko Naming Hangad, the third album by Hangad
  - Puso ng Pasko, a 1998 Filipino comedy fantasy film
  - Puso ng Pasko: Artista Challenge, a Filipino reality TV show
  - Sana Ngayong Pasko, a Filipino drama

== See also ==
- Pashko
- Pasco (disambiguation)
- Pascoe (disambiguation)
