= Pascal (surname) =

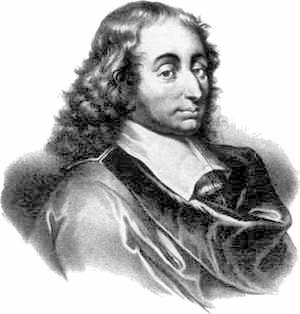
- Blaise Pascal, French philosopher

Origin
- Origin: Latin, in turn of Hebrew
- Meaning: related to Easter
- Region of origin: France, Italy, Neo-Latin Languages

Other names
- Variant forms: Paschal, Pasquale, Pasqual, Pascual

Pascal is a French and an Italian surname of Romance origin.

== Origin of the surname ==
Pascal is a patronymic surname that derives from the personal given name Pascal, from Latin Paschalis, which means "relating to Easter". In France Pascal is especially found in the Southern-Eastern area, in Rhône-Alpes and Provence-Alpes-Côte d'Azur, while in Italy Pascal is found in Northern-Western area, in Piedmont, Aosta Valley and the variant De Pascal in Friuli-Venezia Giulia.

== People ==
- Adam Pascal (born 1970), American actor and singer
- Amy Pascal (born 1958), American film producer.
- André Pascal (1932–2001), French songwriter and composer
- Andrew Pascal (born 1965), American businessman in the gaming industry.
- Blaise Pascal (1623–1662), French mathematician and philosopher
- Chris Pascal, Co-director of the Centre for Research in Early Childhood
- Christine Pascal (1953–1996), French actress, writer and director
- Dave Pascal (1918–2003), American cartoonist
- Ernest Pascal (1896–1966), English-American writer
- Étienne Pascal (1588–1651), French judge and amateur scientist, father of Blaise
- Fabian Pascal, Romanian-American computer scientist
- Francine Pascal (1932–2024), American author
- Françoise Pascal (born 1949), Mauritian-British actress
- Françoise Pascal (poet) (1632 – c. 1698), French poet, painter, playwright and lyricist
- Gabriel Pascal (1894–1954), Romanian film producer and director
- Gisèle Pascal (1921–2007), French actress
- Jacqueline Pascal (1625–1661), the sister of Blaise
- Jean-Claude Pascal (1927–1992), French singer
- Jean-Thenistor Pascal (born 1982), Haitian-Canadian professional boxer
- John Pascal (1932–1981), American playwright
- Julia Pascal, British playwright
- Maite Orsini Pascal (born 1988), Chilean actress and model
- Marie-Georges Pascal (1946–1985), French actress
- Marta Pascal (born 1983), Spanish politician
- Martine Pascal (born 1939), French actress
- Mary Ann Pascal (born 1958), American actress
- Nelon Pascal (born 1987), West Indian cricketer
- Olivia Pascal (born 1957), German actress
- Paul Pascal (1839–1905), French landscape painter
- Pedro Pascal (born 1975), Chilean-American actor
- Robert A. Pascal (1934–2021), American politician
- Zach Pascal (born 1994), American football player

== Fictional characters ==
- Ana Pascal, the love interest of the main character in Stranger than Fiction
- Dom Pascal, a firefighter appearing in Chicago Fire
- Esmée Pascal, a police officer appearing in the second season of Dexter
- Mattia Pascal, the main character in The Late Mattia Pascal by Luigi Pirandello

== See also ==
- Pascal (given name)
- Pascal (disambiguation)
