= San Pasquale =

San Pasquale may refer to:

- San Pasquale (Naples Metro)
- San Pasquale, a fictional country in Commander in Chief episodes

== See also ==
- Paschal (disambiguation)
- San Pasqual (disambiguation)
