= Pasquale =

- Pronunciation: pah-SKWA-leh
- Gender: male

Origin
- Origin: Latin
- Meaning: "associated with Passover (or Easter)"
- Region of origin: Neolatin languages

Other names
- Related names: Pasqual, Pascal, Pascale, Pascalle, Paschal, Paschalis, Pascoe, Pascual, Pascuale, Pasquino

Pasquale is a masculine Italian given name and a surname found all over Italy. It is a cognate of the French name Pascal, the Spanish Pascual, the Portuguese Pascoal and the Catalan Pasqual. Pasquale derives from the Latin paschalis or pashalis, which means "relating to Easter", from Latin pascha ("Easter"), Greek Πάσχα, Aramaic pasḥā, in turn from the Hebrew פֶּסַח, which means "to be born on, or to be associated with, Passover day". Since the Hebrew holiday of Passover coincides closely with the later Christian holiday of Easter, the Latin word came to be used for both occasions.

The names Paschal, Pasqual, Pascal, Pascale, Pascha, Paschalis, Pascual, Pascoe and Pasco are variations of Pasquale. The feminine form, rather rare, is Pasquala, Pasqualina, Pascale, Pascalle or Pascalina. As a surname in Italy, Pasquale has many variations found all over the country: Pasquali, Pascale, Pascal, Pascali, Pascalis, De Pascalis, Pasqual, De Pasqual, De Pascal, De Pasquali, Di Pasquale, DiPasquale, Di Pascali, Di Pasquali, De Pasquale, De Pasqualin, De Pasqualis, Pasqualin, Pasqualini, Pasqualino, Pasqualon, Pasqualotto, Pasqualigo, Pasqualetti.

Notable people named Pasquale or Di Pasquale include:

== Given name ==
- Pasquale Aiello (born 1976), Italian scientist
- Pasquale Aiese (born 1962), Italian lightweight rower
- Pasquale Aleardi (born 1971), Swiss actor
- Pasquale Amati (1716–1796), Italian antiquary
- Pasquale Amato (1878–1942), Italian opera singer
- Pasquale Anfossi (1727–1797), Italian opera composer
- Pasquale Anselmo (born 1958), Italian actor
- Pasquale Barra (1942–2015), Italian hitman
- Pasquale Bellonio (1698–1786), Italian painter
- Pasquale Berardi (born 1983), Italian footballer
- Pasquale Bini (1716–1770), Italian violinist and composer
- Pasquale Bona (1808–1878), Italian composer
- Pasquale Bonavota (born 1974), Italian mobster
- Pasquale De Bonis (born 1979), Italian neurosurgery
- Pasquale Borgomeo (1933–2009), director of Vatican radio
- Pasquale Brignoli (1824–1884), American opera singer
- Pasquale Bruno (born 1962), Italian footballer
- Pasquale Buba (1946–2018), American film editor
- Pasquale Buonocore (1916–2003), Italian water polo player
- Pasquale Busca (born 1948), Italian racewalker
- Pasquale Festa Campanile (1927–1986), Italian screenwriter and film director
- Pasquale Camerlengo (born 1966), an Italian retired competitive ice dancer
- Pasquale Cajano (1921–2000), an Italian-American film actor
- Pasquale Carpino (1936–2005), Italian chef, host of Pasquale's Kitchen Express
- Pasquale Cicogna (1509–1595), Italian politician, the Doge of Venice from 1585 to 1595
- Pasquale "Pat" Cipollone (born 1966), American lawyer, White House Counsel for President Trump
- Pasquale Joseph Federico (1902–1982), an American patent attorney and mathematician
- Pasquale Foggia (born 1983), Italian footballer
- Pasquale Fornara (1925–1990), an Italian road bicycle racer
- Pasquale Galluppi (1770–1846), Italian philosopher
- Pasquale Gravina (born 1970), Italian professional volleyball player
- Pasquale Gumbo, fictional character in the Rose Is Rose comic strip
- Pasquale Macchi (1923–2006), an Italian Catholic archbishop, private secretary to Pope Paul VI
- Pasquale Stanislao Mancini (1817–1888), an Italian jurist and statesman
- Pasquale Marino (born 1962), Italian football coach
- Pasquale Mastroianni (born 1971), Canadian actor
- Pasquale Ottini (c. 1570–1630), an Italian painter of the early-Baroque period, active mainly in Verona
- Pasquale Padalino (born 1972), an Italian footballer
- Pasquale Paoli (1725–1807), a Corsican patriot and leader
- Pasquale del Pezzo (1859–1936), an Italian mathematician
- Pasquale Rizzoli (1871–1953), an Italian sculptor
- Pasquale Rossi (1641 – after 1718), Italian painter
- Pasquale Simonelli (1878–1960), an Italian-American banker
- Pasquale Squitieri (1938–2017), Italian film director
- Pasquale Villari (1827–1917), an Italian historian and politician
- Prince Pasquale, Count of Bari (1852–1904), an Italian noble

== Surname ==
- Anton de Pasquale (born 1995), Australian motor racing driver
- Arnaud Di Pasquale (born 1979), French tennis player
- Eli Pasquale (born 1960), Canadian basketball player
- Emanuel di Pasquale, American poet and translator
- Eugene DePasquale (born 1971), American politician
- Frank Pasquale, American legal scholar
- Frédéric de Pasquale (1931–2001), French actor
- Giovanni Pasquale (born 1982), Italian football player
- James Di Pasquale (born 1941), American composer
- Joe Pasquale (born 1961), British comedian
- Joseph de Pasquale, American violist
- Luigi Di Pasquale, Italian footballer
- Mauro Di Pasquale, American columnist
- Pancrazio De Pasquale (1925–1992), Italian politician
- Simone Di Pasquale (born 1978), Italian professional dancer and TV personality
- Steven Pasquale, American actor
- Umberto Pasquale (1906–1985), Italian priest and writer

== Other ==
- Don Pasquale, a comic opera by Gaetano Donizetti
- Olivo e Pasquale, a melodramma giocoso by Gaetano Donizetti
- Pasquale, pseudonym of Don Manley (born 1945), British crossword compiler
- Pasquale (film), 1916 American silent film

== See also ==
- Pascal (disambiguation)
- Paschal (disambiguation)
- Pascual (disambiguation)
- Pasqual (disambiguation)
