= San Pascual =

San Pascual may refer to:

- Paschal Baylón, a Spanish friar and saint in the Roman Catholic Church
- San Pascual, Batangas in the Philippines
- San Pascual, Masbate in the Philippines
- San Pascual, Ávila in Castile and León, Spain
- San Pascual (Madrid), a ward of Ciudad Lineal district, Madrid, Spain
- San Pascualito, a folk saint venerated in Guatemala and southern Mexico
- San Pascual Pueblo, a former Piro pueblo in New Mexico, United States

== See also ==
- San Pasqual (disambiguation)
