= Paskaljević =

Paskaljević (Serbian: Паскаљевић) is a Serbian surname meaning "son of Paskal".

The surname may refer to:

- Bata Paskaljević (1923–2004), Serbian actor
- Goran Paskaljević (born 1947), Serbian film director
