= San Pascual, Ávila =

San Pascual
- municipality
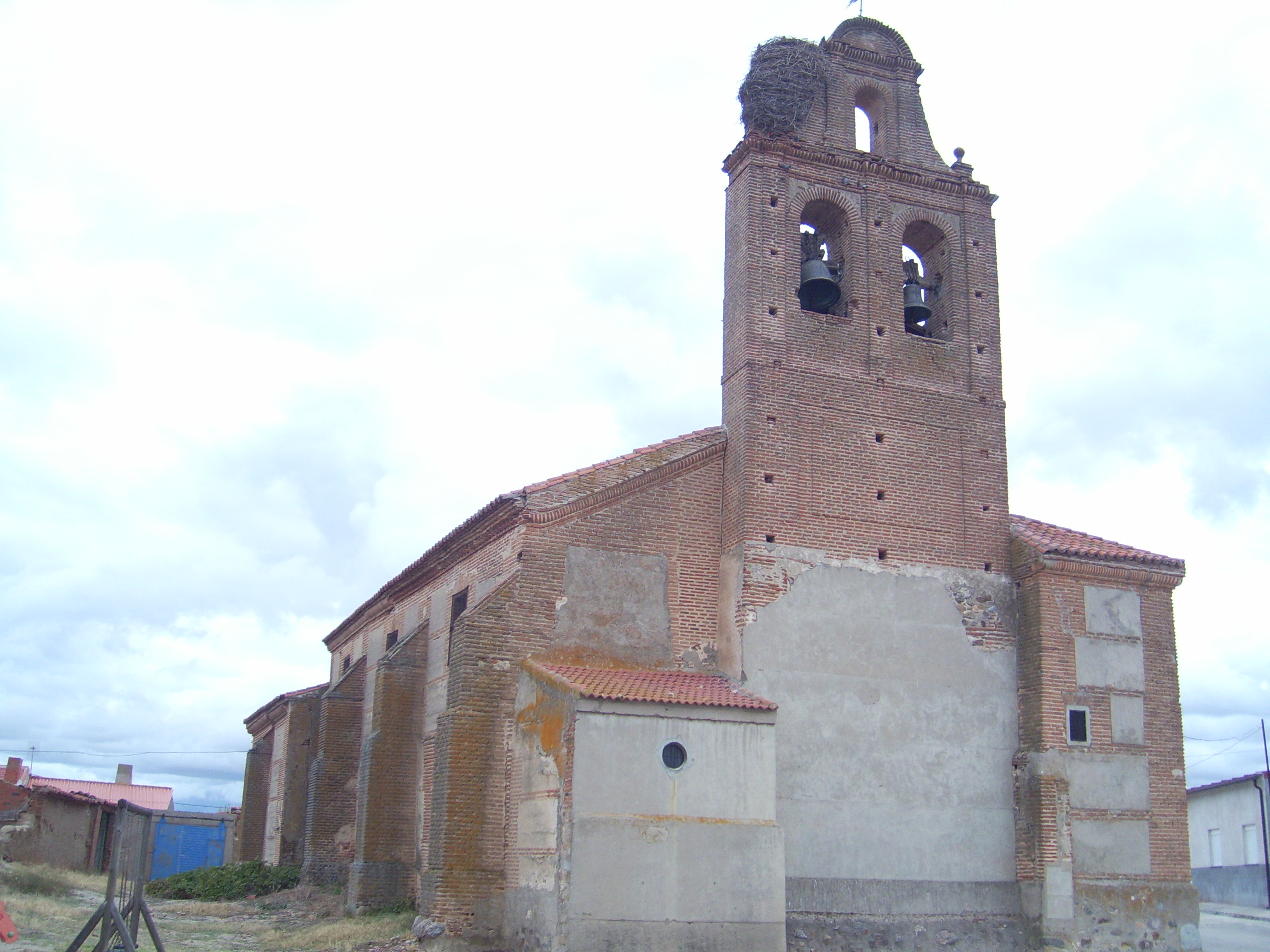
- Main Church in the village of San Pascual

- Location in Spain. San Pascual (Spain)
- Coordinates: 40°52′56″N 4°45′22″W
- Country: Spain
- Autonomous community: Castile and León
- Province: Ávila
- Municipality: San Pacual

Area
  - Total: 18.61 km^{2} (7.19 sq mi)
- Elevation: 881 m (2,890 ft)

Population (2025-01-01)
  - Total: 44
  - Density: 2.4/km^{2} (6.1/sq mi)
- Time zone: CET
  - Summer (DST): CEST
- Website: Official website

San Pascual is a municipality located in the province of Ávila, Castile and León, Spain.

== Geography ==
San Pascual is located 34 km from Ávila and 123 km from Madrid. The municipality is reached from the AV-804 road that connects Arévalo and Ávila, and then the AV-P-120 road. The municipality covers 18.61 km^{2} and is located at an altitude of 881 meters above sea level. San Pascual is located in the comarca La Moraña, which mainly consists of a sandy plain with pine forests and the cultivation of cereals and legumes.

San Pascual is located on the northern plateau of the Iberian Peninsula. It is located on a plain about 7 km from the left bank of the Adaja river – a tributary of the Duero. To the west of the town, the Arevalillo river flows and marks the border with Cabizuela, while the Berlanas stream is 300 m east of the town. The municipality of San Pascual is oval, except for a strip of land almost 7 km long that extends northeast of the town center and ends at the banks of the Adaja River, which borders Pajares de Adaja.

== Population ==
Historical population
Year	Pop.	±% p.a.
2023	43	—
2024	45	+4.65%
2025	44	−2.22%
Source: INE

== Climate ==
San Pascual has a Mediterranean climate of type Csb, with mild and dry summers, according to the average values of precipitation and temperature; the average temperature in July is 21.3 °C and an annual precipitation of about 400 mm.

== Flora ==
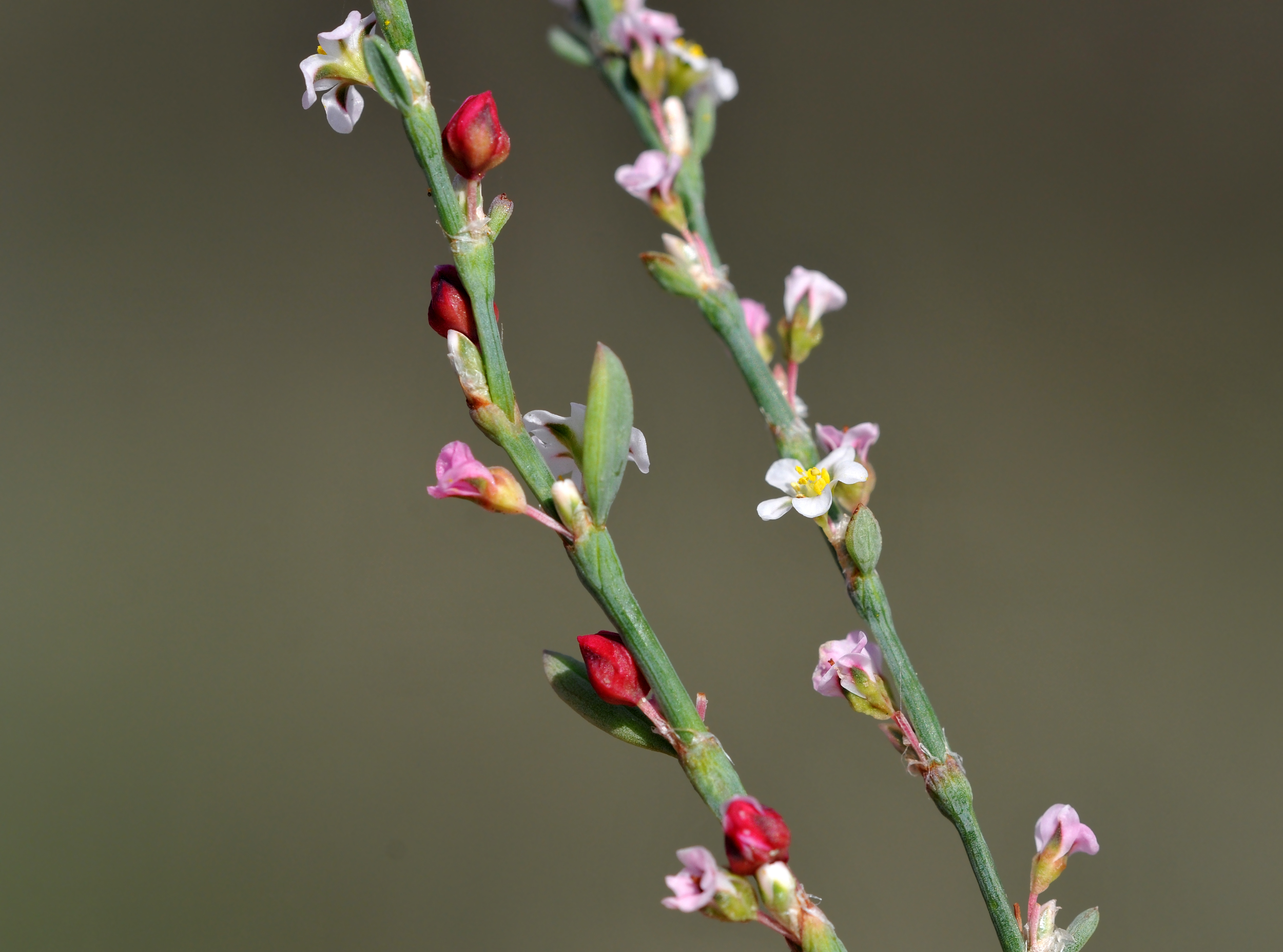
Polygonum equisetiforme

Two plant species discovered in San Pascual for the first time in all of Castile and León:

- Polygonum equisetiforme
- Trifolium vesiculosum

Six other species that have been observed in San Pascual for the first time in the province of Ávila are:

- Aeluropus littoralis
- Lythrum tribracteatum
- Spergularia heldreichii
- Loncomelos narbonense
- Juncus foliosus
- Loeflingia hispanica

== Fauna ==
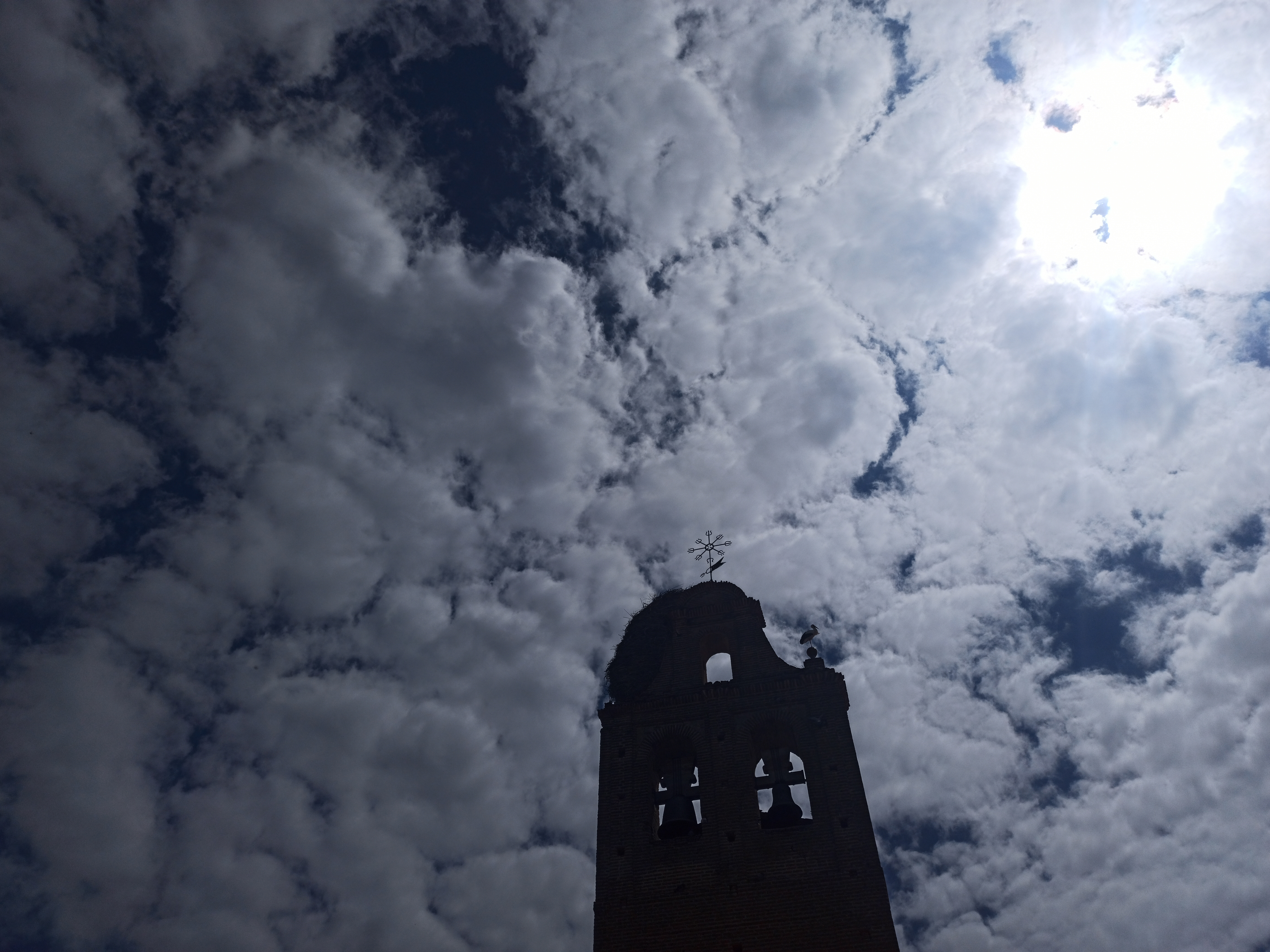
White stork (Ciconia ciconia) on the bell tower of the church of San Pascual.

Among the species that inhabit the municipality to a greater or lesser extent are mammals such as rabbits, hares and foxes, but above all birds; storks and kestrels are found in the parish church, whose church has the largest colony of these birds in the entire La Moraña region.

The proximity of the El Oso lagoons, located two kilometers from the municipality, attracts many bird species such as the Iberian magpie (Cyanopica cooki), Long-eared owl (Asio otus), European roller (Coracias garrulus), Great bustard (Otis tarda), Calandra lark (Melanocorypha calandra) and Eurasian skylark (Alauda arvensis), among others.

== History ==
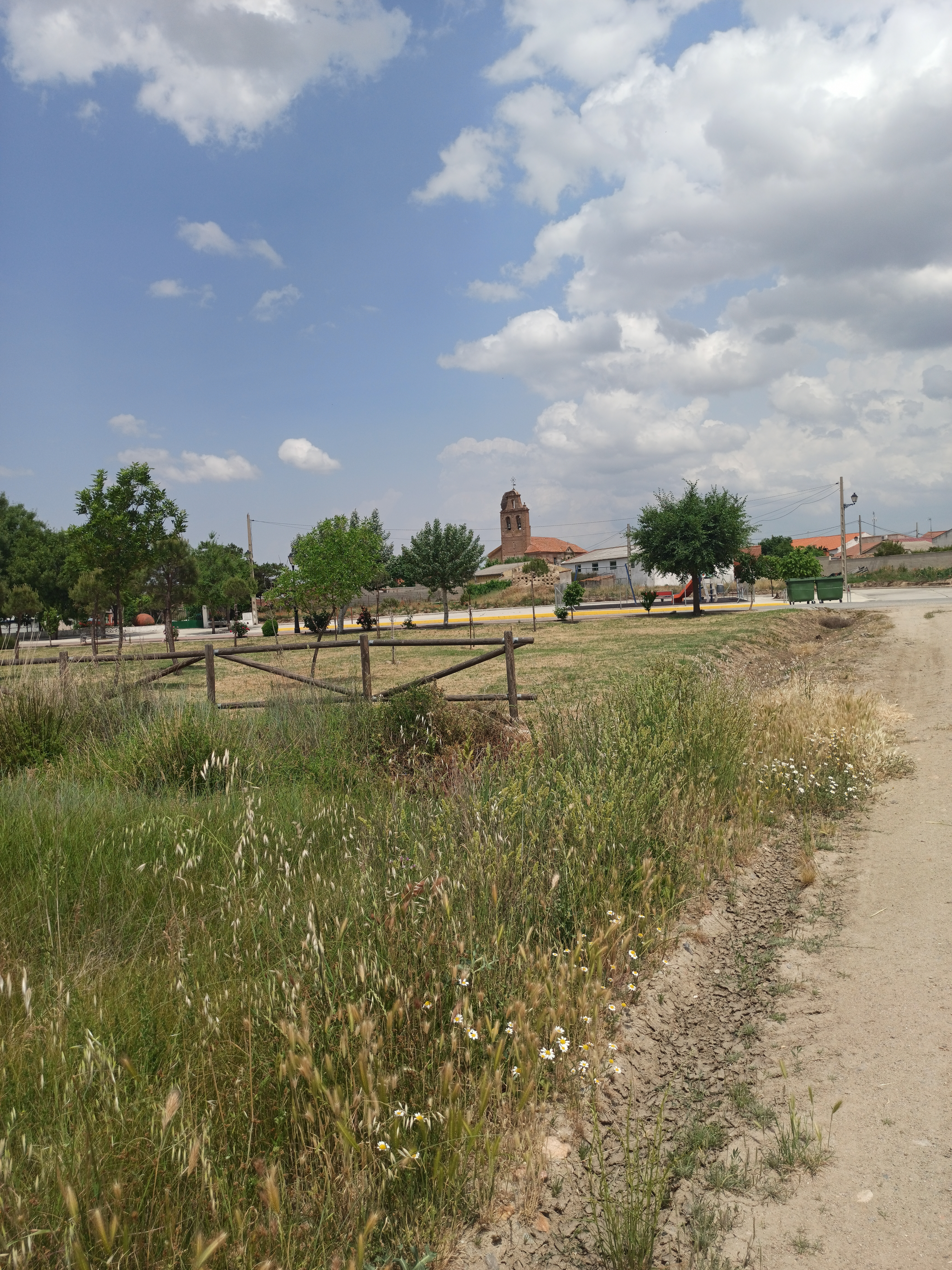
View of the village

The origins of the village date back to the Bronze Age, at a site called Cruz de la Misa ("Cross of the Mass"), northwest of the town center, where pottery artifacts were found.

Between the 15th and 18th centuries, several noble families from Ávila settled in the town:

- Family González de los Galgos, established in the 16th century.
- Serrano family, whose most prominent member was Benito Serrano, who was responsible for collecting rents for the powerful bishop Fonseca, and thus exercised considerable power during the 15th century.
- Villaroel family; in the 18th century, Juana Gómez Conde y Villarroel married the heiress of the Renaissance musician Tomás Luis de Victoria.

Other residents of the municipality listed as nobles in a 1620 census include: Catalina de Salcedo, Domingo Blázquez, Sabina de Peralta, Francisco Blázquez and Cristóbal Dueñas. On September 28, 1549, Manuel de Nava, son of Hernán Gil, both residents of San Pascual, was recognized as a nobleman. On September 28, 1600, Francisco Vázquez Dávila, resident of San Pascual, was recognized as a nobleman.

== Economy ==
The economy of San Pascual is based on the primary sector: cereal, legume and viticulture, sheep and pig farming, resin extraction from pine forests and a private hunting reserve.

Tourism has strengthened the economy of the municipality. Thanks to its artistic heritage, archaeological sites, vast pine forests and river and stream banks, rural and nature tourism has emerged, which is used for cycle routes. Birdwatching tourism is also significant, with visitors from the nearby El Oso Lagoon.

== Church ==
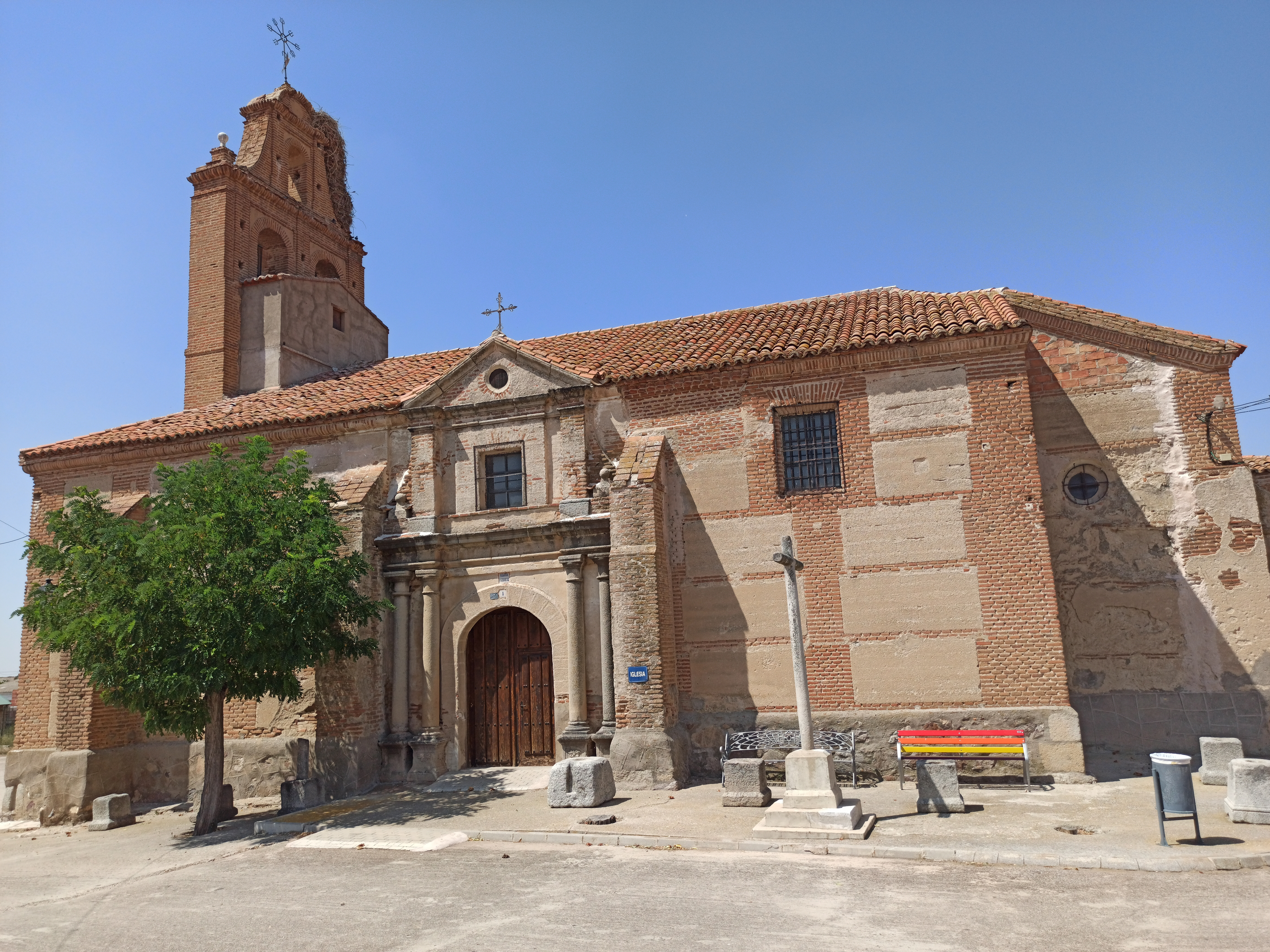
Main facade of the church.

The town's parish church dates from the 18th century. It has a brick bell gable with three openings for bells. The main facade, in neoclassical style, has an arched doorway of ashlar and pairs of columns on either side. The church contains eight paintings of the Virgin Mary by the Spanish Baroque painter Manuel Peti.

== Religious and civil archives ==
Five religious brotherhoods have marked the social and religious life of the inhabitants from 1644 to 1956. The municipal archive contains documents about San Pascual from 1595 to 1981.

== Archaeological sites ==
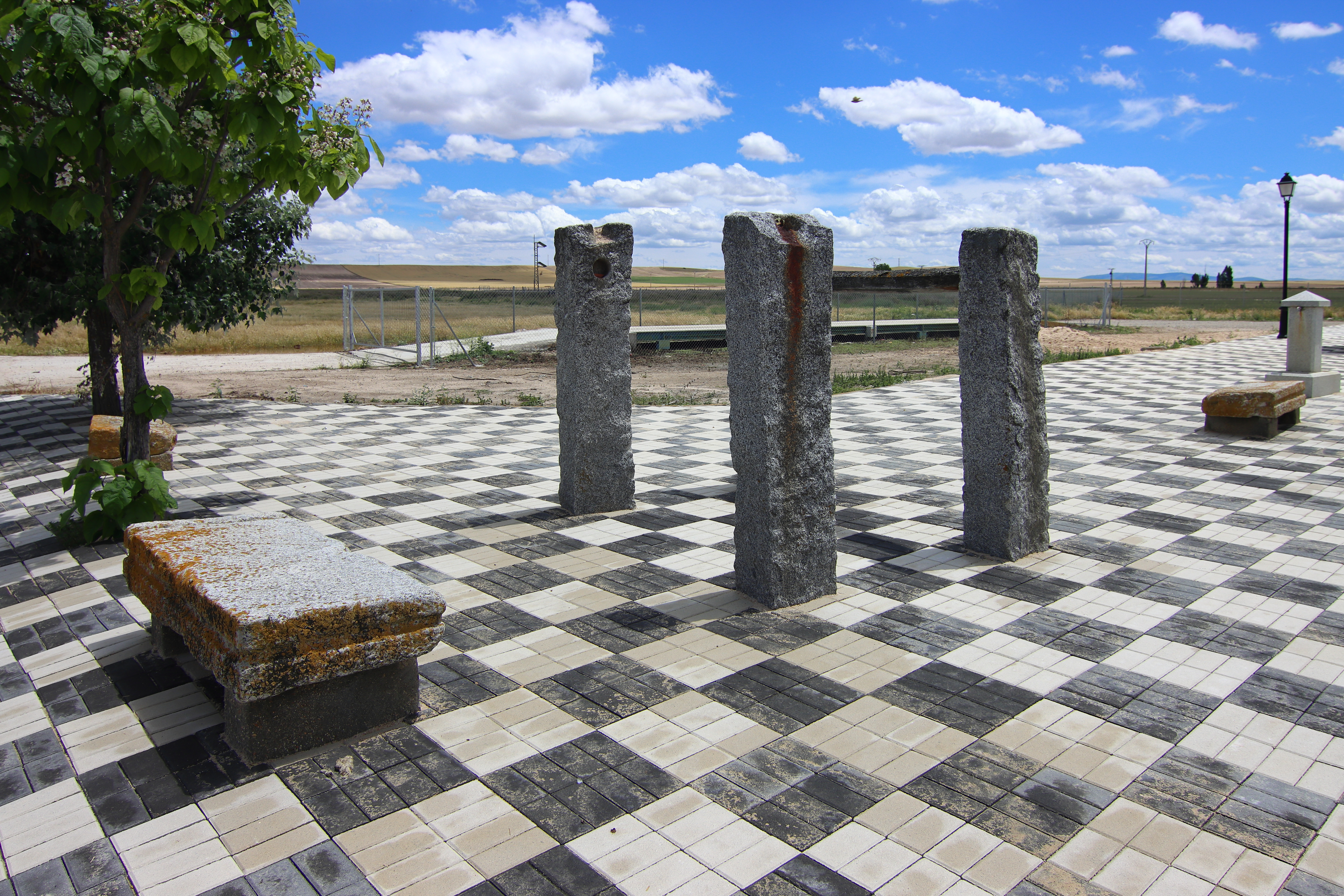
Old Livestock crush of San Pascual.

The municipality has several archaeological sites from different periods. Los Livianos, dating to the Chalcolithic era, contains ceramic remains and granite millstones indicating an early settlement. Cruz de la Misa dates to the Middle and Late Bronze Age. Los Prados, from the Visigothic and Early Middle Ages, exhibits an abundance of roof tiles and ceramics indicating a settlement. Los Bohodoncillos I dates to the Early and Late Middle Ages. Los Bohodoncillos II is also from the Bronze Age. La Coronilla dates to the Early Middle Ages. Cerro Mocito, from the Early Middle Ages and modern times, contains roof tiles, glazed ceramics and possible remains of a sanctuary.

== Festivals ==
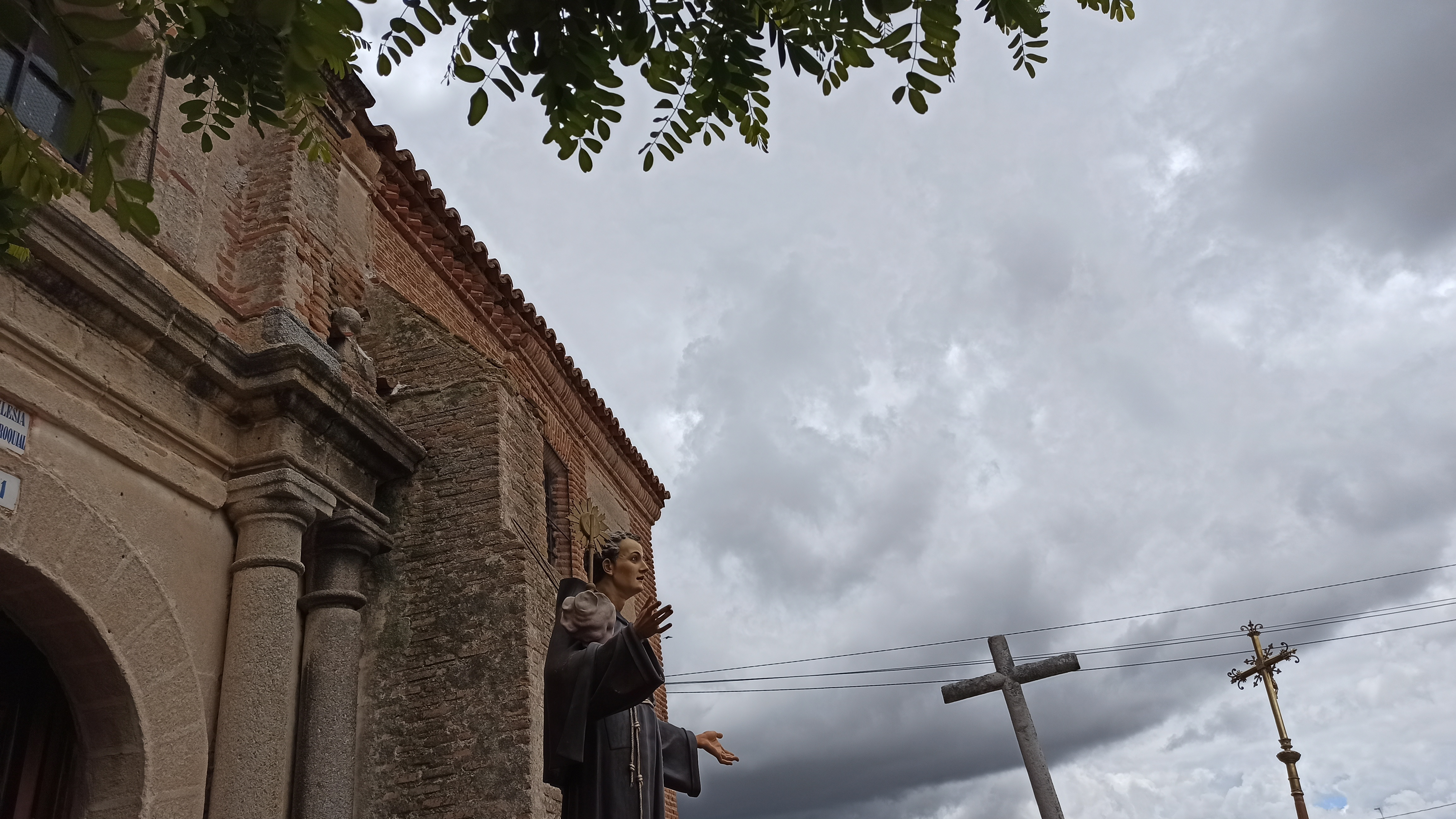
San Pascual (Saint Paschal) fiesta.

The most important celebrations in the municipality take place on 17 May and 2 July.

== Camino de Santiago ==
The Camino de Santiago on the road from Valencia to Santiago de Compostela crosses the municipality.

== Gastronomy ==
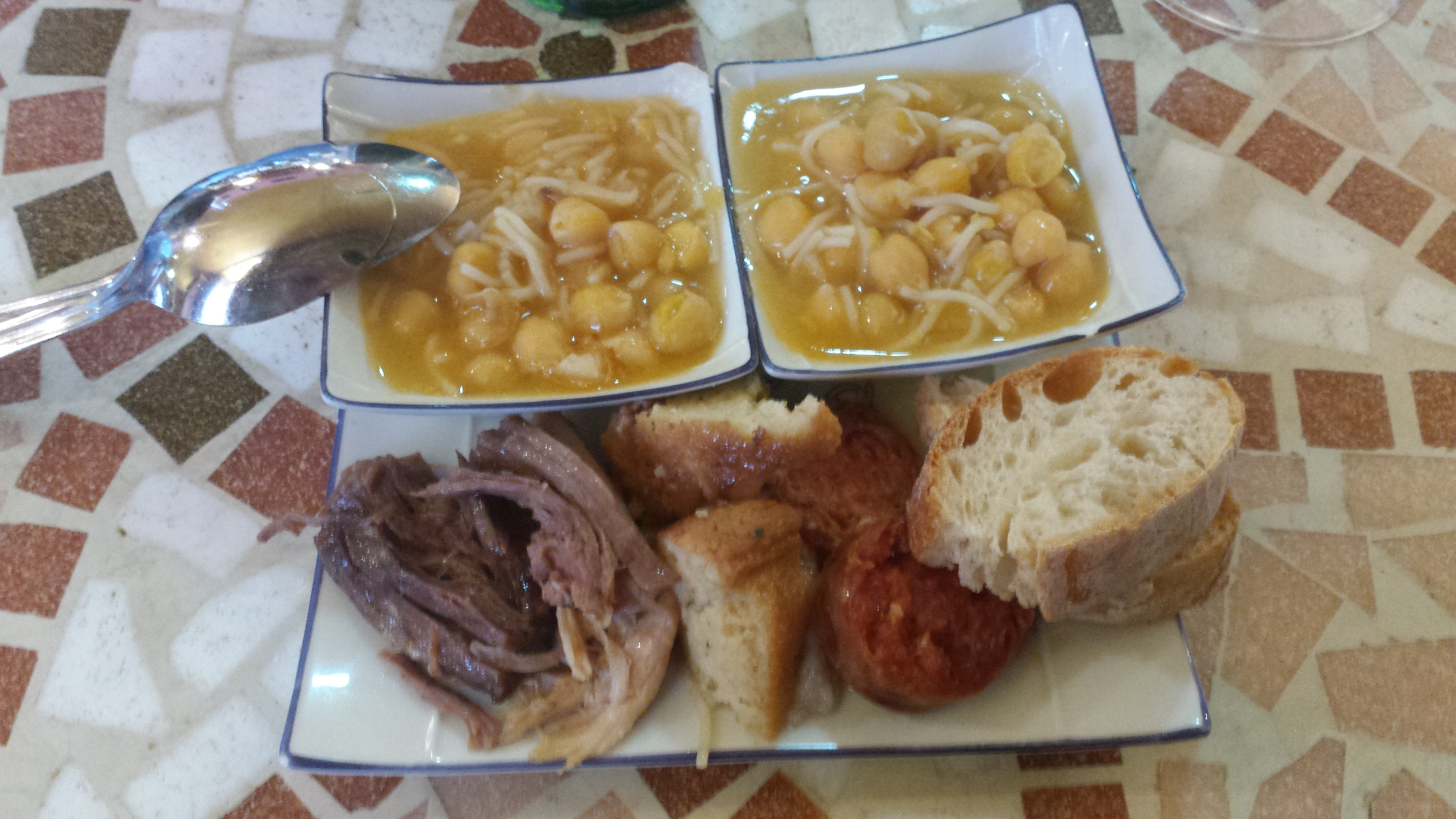
Tapa of cocido from Moraña.

San Pascual is located within the production area of the Protected Geographical Indication Cochinillo de Segovia. Another typical dish is cocido morañego, which is mainly eaten in winter. In summer it is common to eat gazpacho morañego, a gazpacho made with pieces of rustic bread, tomatoes, peppers, onions, garlic, olive oil and vinegar, with a little cold water.
