= Pascall Prize =

Australian prize for critic of the year

The Pascall Prize for Arts Criticism, formerly known as the Pascall Prize and then the Walkley-Pascall Award or Walkley-Pascall Award for Arts Criticism, is one of two annual Walkley Arts Journalism prizes awarded by the Walkley Foundation. The prize was established in 1988 in memory of Geraldine Pascall, an Australian journalist who died of a stroke at the age of 38.

The other award is the June Andrews Award for Arts Journalism, which is supported by the Copyright Agency, recognises significant contribution to arts journalism, and is open to short and long form journalism in all media. This was established in 2017 as the Arts Journalism Award.

== History ==
The Pascall Prize was conceived as a biennial literary award for creative writers who had made original and distinctive contributions to Australia's cultural life. In 1990, to better reflect the work and personal interests of the late Geraldine Pascall, it was decided that the Prize should be awarded annually to a critic or reviewer who contributed regularly in Australia to a newspaper, periodical, or on radio or television. This was extended to include the internet.

It was also agreed that the Pascall Prize would be awarded to a critic working in the areas of literature, art (including design and architecture), food and or wine, music, musical theatre, dance and or drama, film, television or radio. Only sport was specifically excluded.

From 1988 to 2014, the recipient of the Pascall Prize was selected by a judging panel of industry peers appointed by Directors of the Geraldine Pascall Foundation, a not-for-profit organisation established specifically to award the prize. The Pascall Prize and the Geraldine Pascall Foundation were managed by the Music & Opera Singers Trust.

In 2015, the inaugural Lifetime Achievement Award was presented to film critic, journalist and speechwriter Evan Willams AM on 23 May 2015 at an event held at the Sydney Writers' Festival.

In May 2017, it was announced that the Walkley Foundation would take over administration of the Pascall Prize for Arts Criticism and rename it the Walkley-Pascall Award for Arts Criticism, or Walkley-Pascall Award for short. The first Walkley-Pascall Award was made to Kate Hennessy of The Guardian.

Also in 2017, the Arts Journalism Award was established, later named the June Andrews Award for Arts Journalism.

== Description ==
The Pascall Prize is an annual Australian award for critical writing and review, awarded to an art critic whose work over the previous 12 months has contributed significantly to the cultural landscape. As of 2013, it was the only major national prize awarded for critical writing or reviewing in Australia.

The Lifetime Achievement Award is presented to a critic whose body of work exemplifies the values of the Geraldine Pascall Foundation and the Pascall Prize. The inaugural award was presented in 2015.

The June Andrews Award for Arts Journalism is supported by the Copyright Agency, and recognises significant contribution to arts journalism, and is open to short and long form journalism in all media.

== Recipients of the Lifetime Achievement Award ==
Year	Recipient	Presented By
2015	Evan Williams AM	Simon Thomsen, Roland Gridiger

== Recipients of the Pascall Prize for Arts Criticism ==
Year	Recipient	Judging Panel
1988	David Malouf	Edmund Campion (chairman), Susie McKernan, Elizabeth Riddell
1989	not awarded	
1990	Marion Halligan	Andrew Riemer (Convenor), Rosemary Sorensen, Ian Templeman
1991	Joanna Mendelssohn	Andrew Andersons, Leon Paroissen, Daniel Thomas
1992	Alan Saunders	Gay Bilson, Marion Halligan, Barbara Santich
1993	Roger Covell and Cyrus Meher-Homji	Warren Fahey, Diana Simmonds, Ken Tribe AC, Evan Williams, Kim Williams
1994	Sandra Hall	Margaret Fink, Richard Glover, Sandra Levy, John O'Hara, Kim Williams (Convenor)
1995	John McCallum	Katherine Brisbane AM, Martin Portus, Jane Westbrook, Adrian Read (Convenor)
1996	Bruce Elder	Roger Covell, Sandra Hall, John McCallum, Joanna Mendelssohn, Marion Halligan, Alan Saunders, Margaret Throsby AM (Convenor)
1997	Adrian Martin	Roger Covell, Bruce Elder, Sandra Hall, Marion Halligan, John McCallum, Cyrus Meher-Homji, Joanna Mendelssohn, Alan Saunders, Gay Bilson (Convenor)
1998	Andrew Ford	Bruce Elder, Sandra Hall, John McCallum, Joanna Mendelssohn, David Throsby, Adrian Read (Convenor)
1999	Andrew Riemer	Bruce Elder, Andrew Ford, Marion Halligan, Jill Kitson, Adrian Martin, Adrian Read (Convenor)
2000	Robert Nelson	Gay Bilson, Marion Halligan, Adrian Martin, Andrew Riemer, Alan Saunders
2001	Elizabeth Farrelly	Gay Bilson, Bruce Elder, Andrew Ford, Sandra Hall, Robert Nelson, Adrian Read (Convenor)
2002	Noel Purdon	Gay Bilson, Sandra Forbes, Sandra Hall, John McCallum, Adrian Martin, Andrew Riemer
2003	Julie Rigg	Bruce Elder, Andrew Ford, Sandra Hall, David Throsby
2004	Peter Craven	Mary Jo Capps, Andrew Ford, Noel Purdon, Andrew Riemer, Julie Rigg
2005	Gerard Windsor	Elizabeth Farrelly, Marion Halligan, Adrian Martin, Robert Nelson, Susan Wyndham
2006	Robert Forster	Peter Craven, Malcolm Gillies, Kate Gould, Deborah Jones, Antonia Syme, Lyndon Terracini
2007	Paul Byrnes	Bruce Elder (Convenor), Ray Hughes, John McCallum, Julie Rigg, Julianne Schulz
2008	not awarded	
2009	Alison Croggon	Kate Eltham, Robert Forster, Leo Schofield, Rosemary Sorensen, Adrian Read (Convenor)
2010	Mark Mordue	Kathy Cleland, Alison Croggon, Damon Young, Adrian Read (Convenor)
2011	Geordie Williamson	Mark McCallum, Mark Mordue, Adrian Read (Convenor), Damon Young
2012	James Bradley	Alison Croggon, Geordie Williamson, Adrian Read (Convenor)
2013	Kerryn Goldsworthy	James Bradley, Rosemary Sorensen, Adrian Read (Convenor)
2014	James Ley	Jane Caro, Dr Kerryn Goldsworthy, Geordie Williamson, Adrian Read (Convenor)
2015	not awarded	
2016		
2017	Kate Hennessy	
2018	Delia Falconer	
2019	Jeff Sparrow	
2020	Mireille Juchau	
2021	Anwen Crawford	
2022	Sarah Krasnostein	
2023	Catriona Menzies-Pike	
