= Andrew Riemer =

Australian literary critic and author (1936–2020)

Andrew Peter Riemer (29 February 1936 – 5 June 2020) was an Australian literary critic and author, for three decades the book reviewer of the Sydney Morning Herald.

Born in Budapest, Hungary, he moved to Sydney with his family in 1947 at the age of eleven. From 1963 he lectured in English at the University of Sydney for nearly three decades. Although he was a "fine teacher", he experienced a "sense of estrangement from academic life" due to the changes occurring on Sydney's campus and in his English department in those years. He won widespread recognition for his non-fiction and literary criticism, including the Pascall Prize for critical writing in 1999.

Riemer died in 2020 at the age of 84 and was survived by his wife, Nina, a publicist and editor with the Australian Broadcasting Corporation, and his two sons, Nick, a poet and academic in English and linguistics at the University of Sydney, and Tom, a boarding master, rugby coach and chaplain at Saint Ignatius' College, Riverview.

== Books by Andrew Riemer ==
- Inside Outside: Life Between Two Worlds, North Ryde: Angus and Robertson, 1992 - autobiography
- The Habsburg Cafe, Pymble: Angus and Robertson, 1993 - autobiography and travel
- The Demidenko Debate, St Leonards: Allen and Unwin, 1996 - criticism
- Sandstone Gothic: Confessions of an Accidental Academic, St Leonards: Allen & Unwin, 1998 - autobiography
- A Family History of Smoking, Carlton: Melbourne University Press, 2008 - autobiography
