= Sandra Hall (writer) =

Australian film critic

Sandra Hall is an Australian author and journalist, best known as film reviewer for The Age and The Sydney Morning Herald.

== History ==
Hall began her working life as a cadet at the afternoon tabloid, The Sun, studying Arts at Sydney University at night. She wrote a few movie reviews for The Sun, then in 1964, she left Sydney for Canberra to join the staff of Rupert Murdoch's new national daily, The Australian. The following year, she went to London, where she worked on the magazine, Woman's Own, returning in 1966 to work on Network Ten's current affairs programme, Telescope, before becoming a contributor to The Bulletin, edited by Donald Horne, and The Australian, where she was a television critic for a time. In 1971, she became The Bulletin 's film reviewer and in 1973, she won a $6,000 Fellowship from the Literature Board to write a history of Australian television. Entitled Supertoy: 20 Years of Australian Television, it was published in 1976 by Sun Books. In 1978 she was awarded a $10,000 fellowship for a year, to write fiction.

Her first novel, A Thousand Small Wishes, was published in 1995 by Allen & Unwin. Other books: Turning On Turning Off: Australian Television in the Eighties, Cassell Australia (1981), Critical Business: The New Australian Cinema in Review, Rigby Ltd (1985), Beyond the Break, a novel, 4th Estate (2006), Tabloid Man: The Life and Times of Ezra Norton, 4th Estate (2008). In 1994, she won the Pascall Prize for critical writing on film and in 1996, she became a film reviewer for the Sydney Morning Herald.

== Recognition ==
Hall served as president of the Film Critics Circle of Australia from 1991 to 1993.

== Partial bibliography ==
Film and television

- Supertoy: 20 years of television 1976 ISBN 0725102357
- Critical Business: The New Australian Cinema in Review 1985 ISBN 0727020102
- Turning On, Turning Off: Australian television in the eighties 1981 ISBN 0726937347
- Tabloid Man: The Life and Times of Ezra Norton (Note: "Sandra Hall is an accomplished journalist and her biography [of Norton] is as entertaining as it is easy to read") 2008 ISBN 9780732282592

Novels

- Beyond the Break 2006 ISBN 9780732282424 (long-listed for the 2007 Miles Franklin Literary Award)
- A Thousand Small Wishes 1995 ISBN 1863739971
