= Paschall =

Paschall is a surname. Notable people with the surname include:

- Bill Paschall (born 1954), American Major League Baseball player
- Davis Young Paschall (1911–2001), American administrator of educational institutions
- Eric Paschall (born 1996), American basketballer
- Harry Paschall (1896/7–1957), American weightlifter, magazine editor, cartoonist and author
- James E. Paschall (1923–2024), United States Air Force major general
- John M. Paschall (1826/7–1886), American farmer, carpenter and politician
- Nathaniel Paschall (1802–1866), American journalist
- Richard Carlton Paschall III, American diplomat

== See also ==
- Paschal (disambiguation)
- Paschall Davis (born 1969), American football linebacker
- Paschall House, historic house in Arkansas
- Paschall, Philadelphia, neighborhood in southwest Philadelphia
