= Pascale =

- Pronunciation: French: [paskal]
- Gender: feminine

Origin
- Origin: Latin
- Meaning: from Latin Paschalis, associated with Passover (or Easter)

Other names
- Related names: Pascal, Paschal, Paschalis, Pascoe, Pascual, Pasqual, Pasquale

Pascale is a common Francophone given name, the feminine of the name Pascal. The same spelling is also an Italian form of the masculine name Pascal, and an Italian surname derived from the given name.

Pascale derives from the Latin paschalis or pashalis, which means "relating to Easter", ultimately from pesach, the Hebrew name of the feast of Passover.

Notable people with the name include:

== Given name ==
- Pascale Armand, American actress
- Pascale Audret, French actress
- Pascale Bussières, French Canadian actress
- Pascale Carayon, French-American industrial engineer
- Pascale Cossart, French bacteriologist
- Pascale Criton, French composer
- Pascale Dorcelus (born 1979), Canadian weightlifter
- Pascale Ferran, French film director
- Pascale Garaud, French-American astrophysicist
- Pascale Grand, Canadian athletic competitor
- Pascale Grossenbacher, Swiss artistic gymnast
- Pascale Haiti, politician and government minister from French Polynesia
- Pascale Hutton, Canadian actress
- Pascale Küffer, Swiss footballer
- Pascale Machaalani, Lebanese singer and actress
- Pascale Montpetit, French Canadian actress
- Pascale Ogier, French actress
- Pascale Paradis, French tennis player
- Pascale Petit (actress) (born 1938), French actress
- Pascale Petit (poet) (born 1953), French poet
- Pascale Piera, French politician
- Pascale Quiviger, Canadian writer and artist
- Pascale Sablan, African-American architect
- Pascale Sourisse, French businesswoman
- Pascale Stöcklin, Swiss pole vaulter
- Pascale Trinquet, French fencer
- Pascale Vignaux, French fencer
- Pascale Voltaire, German DJ

== Surname ==
Pascale
- Pronunciation: Italian: [pasˈkaːle]

Origin
- Origin: Latin, in turn of Hebrew
- Meaning: patronymic (from the given name)
- Region of origin: Italy, Neo-Latin Languages

Other names
- Variant forms: Paschal, De Pascale, De Pascal, Pasquale, Pasqual, Pascual, Pascalis

- Anie Pascale, Canadian actress
- Ernesto De Pascale, Italian journalist
- Jan Pascale, American set decorator
- Lorraine Pascale, British former model
- Ricardo Pascale, Uruguayan economist and sculptor
- Ronnie Pascale, American soccer player

== See also ==
- The names Paschal, Pasqual, Pasquale, Pascal, Pascha, Pascual, Pascoe and Pasco are all masculine variations of feminine Pascale
