= Roger Covell =

Australian musicologist (1931–2019)

Roger David Covell AM FAHA (1 February 1931 – 4 June 2019) was an Australian musicologist, critic and author. He was Professor Emeritus in the School of the Arts and Media at the University of New South Wales, in Sydney, and continued until shortly before his death to contribute articles and reviews to The Sydney Morning Herald, where he served as principal music critic from 1960 until the late 1990s.

== Biography ==
Published in 1967, Covell's monograph Australia's Music: Themes of a New Society was the first comprehensive study of the history, development and performance of Western art music in Australia, and is now regarded as a seminal text in Australian musicology. It has been widely referenced among succeeding generations of Australian composers, practitioners and critics of serious music, and by Australian cultural historians generally.

Covell died in Sydney on 4 June 2019.

== Bibliography ==
=== Non-fiction ===
- Australia's Music: Themes of a New Society (Sun Books, Melbourne, 1967)

=== Libretti ===
- Morning-song for the Christ Child: for unaccompanied mixed chorus, with music by Peter Sculthorpe (Faber Music, c1966)
- Sea chant: for unison voices and orchestra, with music by Peter Sculthorpe (Faber Music, c1968)
- Autumn Song: for unaccompanied mixed chorus, with music by Peter Sculthorpe (Faber Music, c1972)

=== Edited ===
- The Currency Lass, or, My Native Girl (a musical play in two acts) by Edward Geoghegan (Currency Press, c1976)

== Awards and nominations ==
On Australia Day 1986, Covell was appointed a Member of the Order of Australia in recognition of service to music. Seven years later he was awarded the Pascall Prize for Critical Writing, in recognition of his services to music criticism in Australia.

=== APRA Awards ===
The APRA Awards are held in Australia and New Zealand by the Australasian Performing Right Association to recognise songwriting skills, sales and airplay performance by its members annually.

Year	Nominee / work	Award	Result	Ref.
2006	Roger Covell	Long-Term Contribution to the Advancement of Australian Music	Won	

=== Bernard Heinze Memorial Award ===
The Sir Bernard Heinze Memorial Award is given to a person who has made an outstanding contribution to music in Australia.

Year	Nominee / work	Award	Result	Ref.
2012	Roger Covell	Sir Bernard Heinze Memorial Award	awarded	
