= Filippo Pasquali =

Italian painter

Filippo Pasquali (1651 - 1697) was an Italian painter of the Baroque period, mainly painting sacred subjects.

He was born in Forlì, and was also active in Rimini. He was a pupil of Carlo Cignani. He also worked alongside Marcantonio Franceschini.
