= San Pasqual =

San Pasqual may refer to:

- Rancho San Pascual, land grant
- San Pasqual, Los Angeles County, California
- San Pasqual Valley, San Diego, California
  - San Pasqual, San Diego County, California, the Kumeyaay village that was once located in the San Pasqual Valley and for which the valley is named.
  - San Pasqual Valley AVA
  - San Pasqual Battlefield State Historic Park
    - Battle of San Pasqual
- San Pasqual Handicap, a horse race
- Roman Catholic saints, in English referred to as Saint Paschal
- San Pasqual Band of Diegueno Mission Indians

== See also ==
- San Pascual (disambiguation)
- San Pasquale (disambiguation)
