= Damon Young =

Australian philosopher

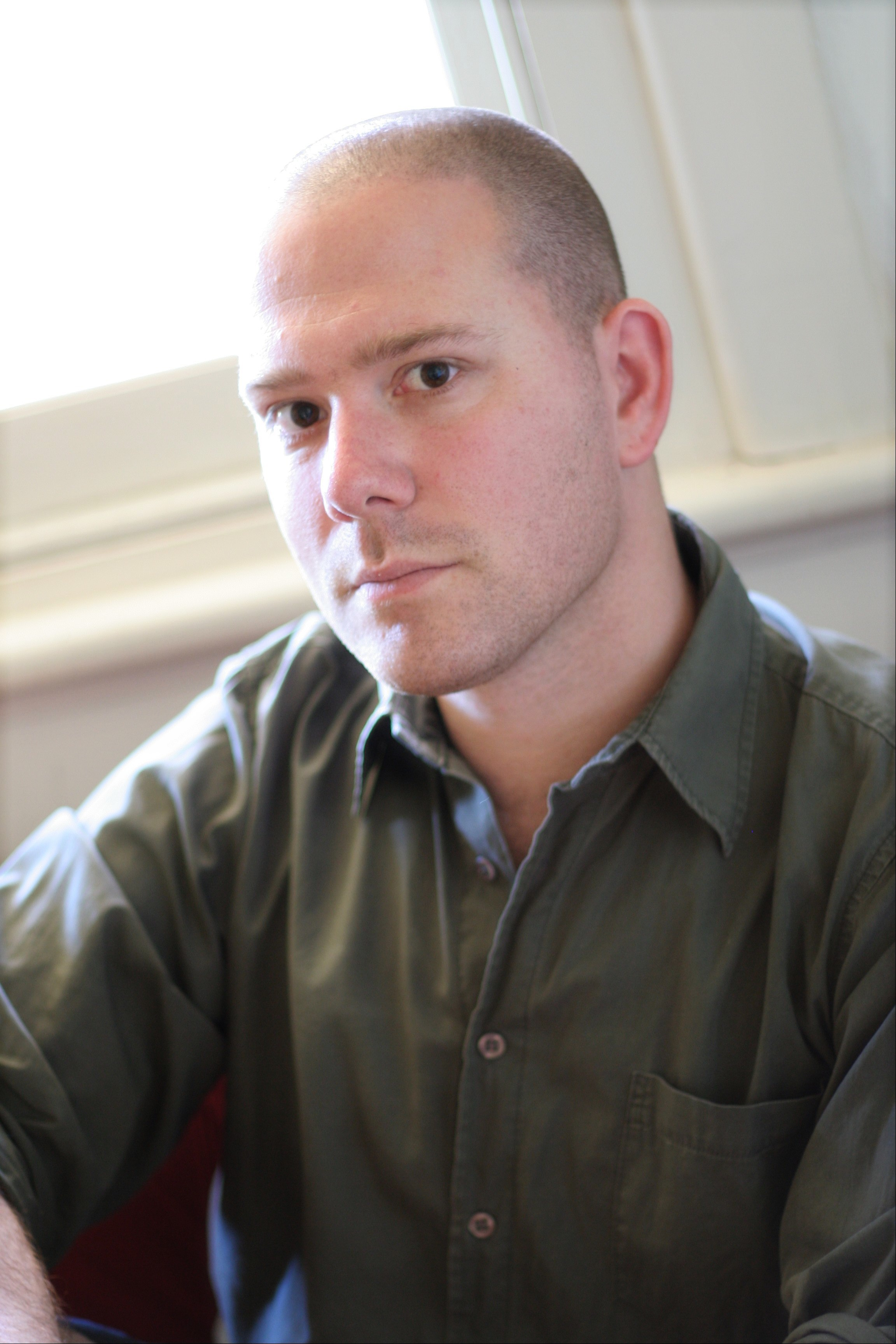
- Born: 1975 (age 50–51); Melbourne, Victoria, Australia

Philosophical work
- Era: Contemporary philosophy
- Region: Western philosophy
- School: Continental philosophy
- Main interests: Aesthetics, Asian philosophy, Rights, Democracy, Spirituality, Environmental philosophy, Martial arts
- Notable ideas: Philosophy of distraction

Damon Young (born 1975 in Melbourne, Victoria) is an Australian philosopher, writer and commentator, and author of the books Distraction, Philosophy in the Garden and How to Think About Exercise. He is an Honorary Fellow in Philosophy at the University of Melbourne.

== Work ==
In 2013 Young won the Australasian Association of Philosophy's media prize for his public writing and broadcasting.

Young is the author of Distraction, an eclectic popular history of Western philosophy, focusing on themes such as attention to life and distraction from it, work, freedom and necessity. The Australian called it lacking in precision, saying its "central proposition – that new information technologies distract us from our common existential challenge – is never thoroughly probed" while London's Financial Times called it "lucid and optimistic".

Philosophy in the Garden, published in Australia in December 2012, was described by The Australian as "fluent and stylish and never marred by cliches or cliched thinking". It was published in the UK in April 2014 by Rider, an imprint of Random House, under the title Voltaire's Vine and Other Philosophies: How Gardens Inspired Great Writers.

Young's columns, reviews and features have been published in The Age, The Sydney Morning Herald, The Australian, Herald Sun, BBC and ABC. He has written poetry and fiction for Overland and Meanjin magazines.

Young regularly comments on radio, and has appeared on Channel 7 Sunrise and ABC TV. He was a regular panellist on ABC Radio National's Life Matters, a monthly guest on Mornings with Alan Brough on 774 ABC Melbourne, and was "philosopher-in-residence" on Afternoons with James Valentine on ABC Sydney 702, and "sports philosopher" with Francis Leach on 1116 SEN.

== Bibliography ==
=== Books ===
- Philosophy in the Garden. Melbourne University Publishing, 2012 (Australian edition). ISBN 978-0-52285-713-9.
- Distraction. Melbourne University Publishing, 2008 (Australian edition). ISBN 978-0-522-85374-2; Acumen Publishing, 2010 (UK/US edition). ISBN 978-1-84465-254-9.
- Martial Arts and Philosophy, edited with Graham Priest, Open Court Publishing, 2010. ISBN 978-0-8126-9684-4.
- How To Think About Exercise , Macmillan Publishers, 2014. ISBN 978-0-2307-6776-8.
- The Art of Reading. Melbourne University Publishing, 2016. ISBN 978-0-522-867602
- On Getting Off (2020)

=== Articles ===
- "Being Grateful for Being: Being, Reverence and Finitude", Sophia 44 2 (2005): 31–53.
- "The Fine Arts of Distinction: Bourdieu on Society and Art", The Australian and New Zealand Journal of Art 7 2 (2006).
- "Bowing to Your Enemies: Courtesy, Budo and Japan", Philosophy East and West 59 2 (2009): 188–215.
- "You don't need Jesus to enjoy Christmas", The Sydney Morning Herald (20/12/10), p. 7.
- "The crisis and the cure", The Sydney Morning Herald, News Review (1/1/11), p. 13.
- "Turn video games into more than child's play", The Sydney Morning Herald (14/1/11), p. 9
- "Legalizing mixed martial arts in New York", New York Daily News (16/1/11), p. 13.
- "Research the name of the game", The Australian, Higher Education (2/3/11), p. 5.
- "Super-rich exceptions are closer to being the rule", The Sydney Morning Herald, News Review (2/4/11), p. 16.
- "Familiarity breeds content for grand old gallery's loyal patrons", The Age (21/4/11), p. 13.

=== Poetry ===
- "The Idea of a Great Gallery", Overland 179 (2005): 41.
- "Howard Watches the Oscars and Weeps With Joy", Overland 174 (2004): 124.

=== Short fiction ===
- "The Lesson", Meanjin 67 4 (2008), pp. 128–35.

=== Critical studies and reviews of Young's work ===
On Getting Off

- Burns, Shannon (January–February 2021). "Begin the banal : a philosophical look at sex". Australian Book Review. 428: 57–58.

———————

Notes and full bibliographic citations
