= Walter Pashko =

American painter (1930 - 2006)

Walter Pashko, American, 1930–2006

"Walter Pashko studied painting in Hartford during the heyday of Chick Austin who made modern art, especially Surrealism, a great strength of the Wadsworth Atheneum. The G.I. Bill enabled him to go to Mexico City where he sought out artists who could teach him the techniques of fresco and mosaic. During his years there, he also learned how to make prints. Upon his return to America, he found a job at the School of the Museum of Fine Arts, Boston as an assistant to the printmaking instructor. Pashko was soon promoted to lead instructor when his supervisor retired. He remained at the School for over thirty years until a fall prompted him to retire in the early 1990s. Though he taught printmaking, Pashko regarded himself primarily as a painter and draftsman. He remained active in his retirement, producing the present works during his early seventies."

== Works ==
- Still Life with Fork, Walter Pashko 1954, Farley Family Private Collection, Newport, RI

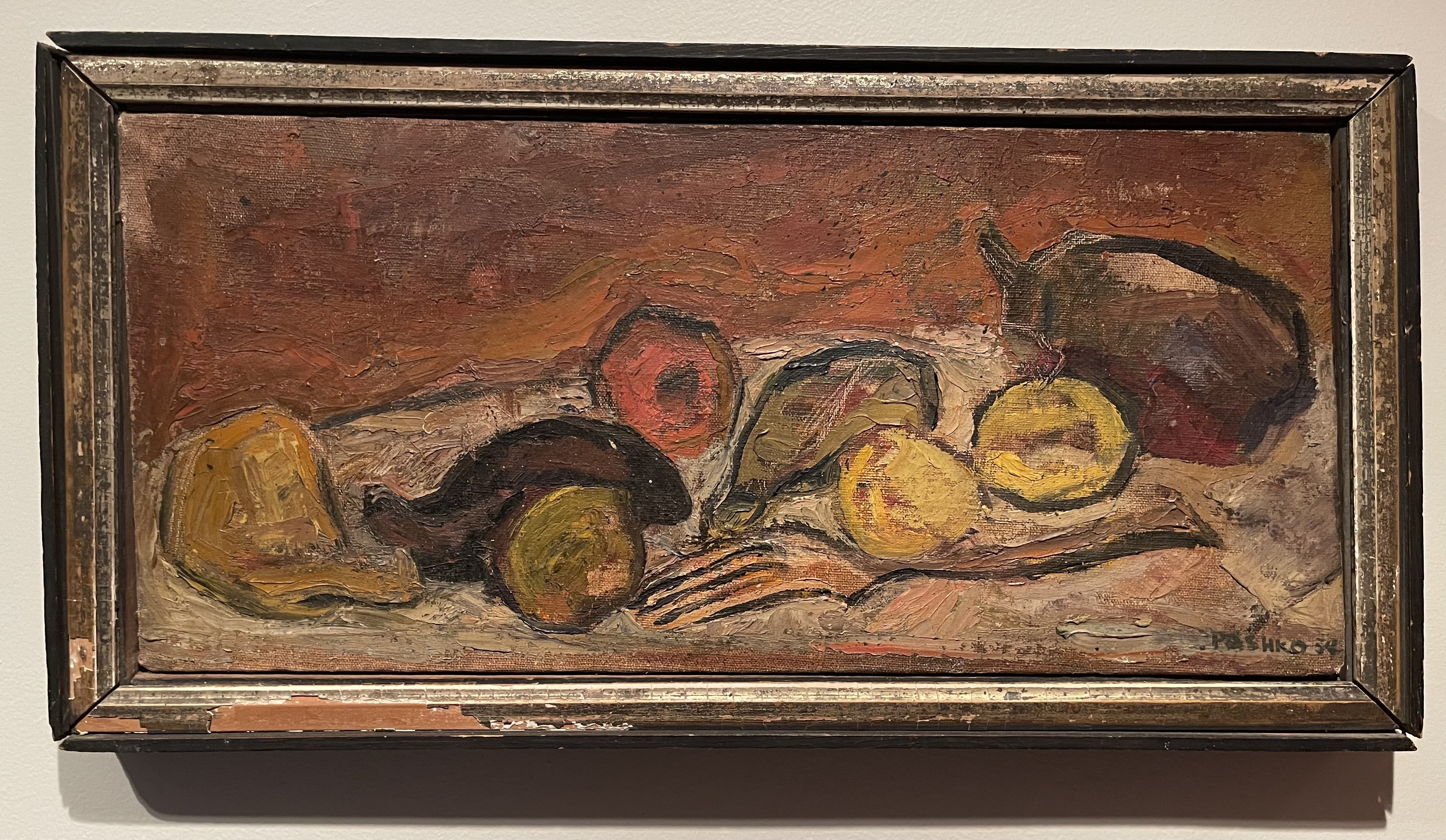
Still Life with Fork

- Untitled, 2002 Museum of Fine Arts, Boston
- Untitled, (May, 22) 2002 Museum of Fine Arts, Boston
