= Pasqual =

- Pronunciation: Catalan: [pəˈskwal] Venetian: [paˈskwal]
- Gender: masculine

Origin
- Origin: Latin
- Meaning: "associated with Passover (or Easter)"
- Region of origin: Neolatin languages

Other names
- Related names: Pasquale, Pascual, Pascuale, Pascal, Paschal, Pascoal, Pascale, Pascalle, Paschalis, Pasco, Pascoe

Pasqual is the Catalan equivalent of the Spanish given name Pascual, and a Venetian variant of Italian given name Pasquale. Pasqual is also a surname found in Spain (especially among the inhabitants of Catalan-speaking areas, including Andorrans, Valencians, Balearics) and in Italy (especially in Veneto, including Lombardy and Piedmont).

Pasqual, like Pasquale (Italian), Pascal (French), Pascoal (Portuguese) and Pascual (Spanish), derives from the Late Latin paschalis or pashalis, from Latin pascha, Greek Πάσχα, Aramaic pasḥā, in turn from the Hebrew pesach, which means "to be born on, or to be associated with, Passover day". The English equivalent of Pasqual is Pascal (loosely translated as "Easter" child) and is associated both with the day of Passover and the Latinised forms mentioned above, since all of them have a relationship to the Hebrew holiday of Passover; as Christ was crucified prior to or on the eve of Passover he became known as the Passover Lamb, 1 Corinthians 5:7.

The names Pasquale, Paschal, Pascal, Pascale, Pascha, Pascoe and Pasco are all variations of Pasqual. The feminine form, rather rare, is Pasquala, Pasqualina, Pascale, Pascalle or Pascalina. As a surname in Italy, Pasqual has many variations found all over the country: Pasquali, De Pasqual, Pascale, Pascali, Pascalis, De Pascal, De Pasquali, De Pasquale, Di Pasquale, Di Pascali, De Pasqualis, Pasqualin, Pasqualon. As a given name and surname in Spanish-speaking countries Pasqual is often spelled Pascual.

Notable people with the name include:

== Given name ==
- Pasqual Coco (born 1977), Dominican pitcher in Major League Baseball
- Pasqual Ferry (sometimes credited as Paschalis, Pascual or Pascal), Spanish comic book artist and penciller
- Pasqual Maragall (born 1941), the 127th President of Generalitat de Catalunya
- Pasqual Sanchis Moscardó (born 1963), Valencian professional pilota player
- Pasqual Scanu (1908–1978), Italian writer in Catalan and Italian

== Surname ==
- Anupa Pasqual (born 1964), Sri Lankan politician
- Ernest Benach i Pasqual (born 1959), Catalan politician, President of the Catalan Parliament
- Keerthi Pasquel (born 1955), Sri Lankan Sinhala pop musician
- Manuel Pasqual (born 1982), Italian footballer
- Sudath Prajiv Pasqual (born 1961), Sri Lankan cricketer

== See also ==
- Pasqual Maragall Foundation, a public foundation in Catalonia, Spain
- Pasqual, Romansh name of Paspels, municipality in the district of Hinterrhein in the Swiss canton of Graubünden.
- Battle of San Pasqual (also spelled San Pascual), a military encounter during the Mexican–American War
- San Pasqual Handicap, an American Thoroughbred horse race run at Santa Anita Park, California, United States
- San Pasqual High School (Escondido, California), a public high school in Escondido, California, United States
- San Pasqual Valley, a community of the city of San Diego, California, United States
- San Pasqual (disambiguation)
- Pascual (disambiguation)
- Pascal (disambiguation)
- Paschal (disambiguation)
- Pasquale (disambiguation)
