= Pascali's Island =

Pascali's Island may refer to:

- Pascali's Island (novel), a 1980 novel by Barry Unsworth
- Pascali's Island (film), a 1988 film written and directed by James Dearden
