= Chris Pascoe =

English writer (born 1966)

Christopher Paul Pascoe (born 26 April 1966) is an English writer of humorous books, and magazine columnist.

== Career ==
=== Books ===
His first two books, A Cat Called Birmingham (Hodder & Stoughton, 2005) and You Can Take the Cat Out of Slough (Hodder & Stoughton, 2007) tell the story of a disaster-prone cat named Birmingham.

A Cat Called Birmingham has since been translated into French and Chinese. In France, the book is titled Monsieur Chatastrophe. The book caused controversy in Birmingham because it was seen as a slur on the city by a London-based writer.

You Can Take the Cat Out of Slough has also been released in France (October 2009), titled Le Journal de Monsieur Chatastrophe.

A Cat Called Birmingham and You Can Take the Cat Out of Slough have featured in Kindle's Top-Ten Cat books, and A Cat Called Birmingham is now in its tenth U.K. edition. You Can Take the Cat Out of Slough was re-released in paperback in 2015.

In 2009, Pascoe signed with Anova Books, and Death, Destruction and a Packet of Peanuts, a humorous factual/historical tour of the English Civil War battlefields and their pubs, was released on Anova's Portico imprint in July 2010.

Confessions of a Cat Sitter, based on the long-running Your Cat magazine series, was released in January 2016.

The World's Daftest Rabbit, a collection of his My Weekly magazine columns, was released by My Weekly in September 2017, and The World's Craziest Cats in September 2018.

=== Magazine writing ===
Pascoe is now a writer with various U.K. and U.S. magazines, and is a columnist for the U.K. national magazines My Weekly and Your Cat.

== See also ==
- List of English writers
- List of humorists
