= Cabizuela =

- municipality
- Cabizuela within Ávila province

- Location in Spain. Cabizuela (Spain)
- Coordinates: 40°54′04″N 4°48′01″W
- Country: Spain
- Autonomous community: Castile and León
- Province: Ávila

Government
  - Mayor: Angélica Sáez Holgado (People's Party)

Area
  - Total: 19.17 km^{2} (7.40 sq mi)
- Elevation: 884 m (2,900 ft)

Population (2025-01-01)
  - Total: 89
  - Density: 4.6/km^{2} (12/sq mi)
- Time zone: UTC+1 (CET)
  - Summer (DST): UTC+2 (CEST)
- Website: Official website

Cabizuela is a municipality located in the province of Ávila, Castile and León, Spain. According to the 2018 census (INE), the municipality had a population of 82 inhabitants.

== Population ==
Historical population
Year	Pop.	±% p.a.
2023	88	—
2024	88	+0.00%
2025	89	+1.14%
Source: INE
