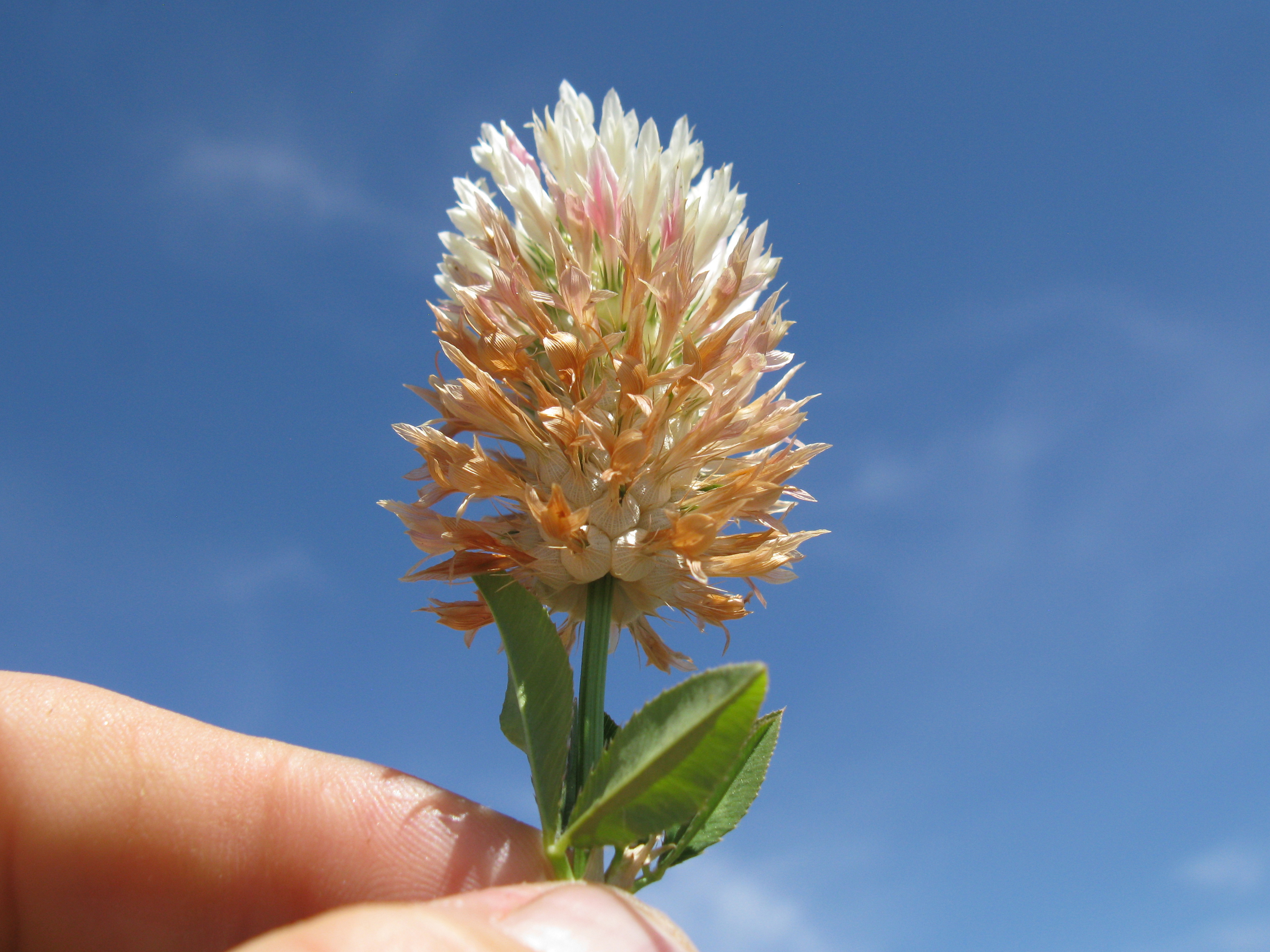
- Flowerhead
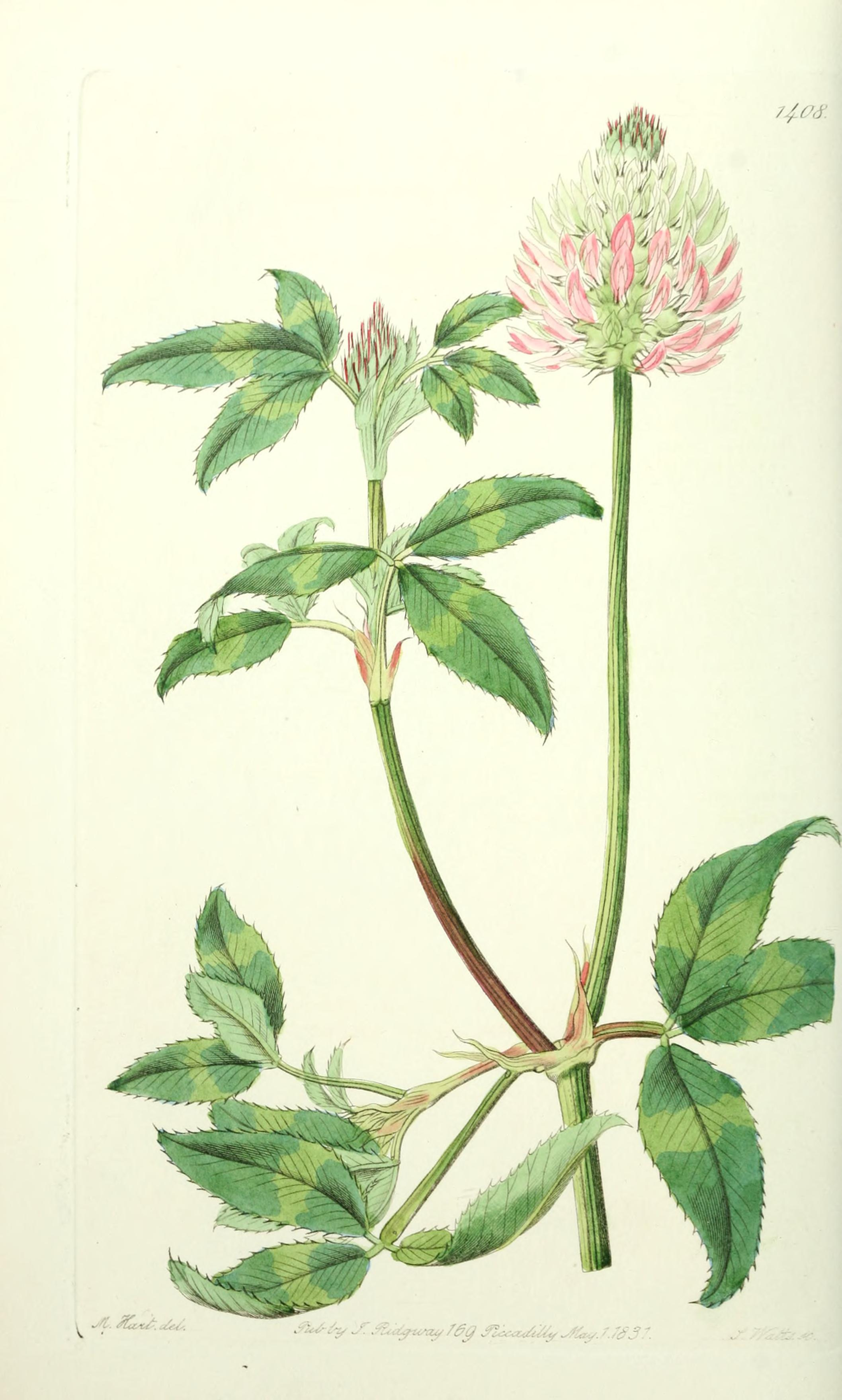
- Botanical illustration

Scientific classification
- Kingdom: Plantae
- Clade: Tracheophytes
- Clade: Angiosperms
- Clade: Eudicots
- Clade: Rosids
- Order: Fabales
- Family: Fabaceae
- Subfamily: Faboideae
- Genus: Trifolium
- Species: T. vesiculosum

Binomial name
- Trifolium vesiculosum Savi

Synonyms
- Amoria vesiculosa (Savi) Roskov; Mistyllus turgidus (M.Bieb.) C.Presl; Trifolium recurvum Waldst. & Kit.; Trifolium turgidum M.Bieb.; Trifolium vesiculosum var. grisebachianum Gibelli & Belli; Trifolium vesiculosum subvar. stanodactylon Gibelli & Belli

= Trifolium vesiculosum =

Species of plant

Trifolium vesiculosum, the arrowleaf clover, is a species of flowering plant in the family Fabaceae. It is native to southeastern and eastern Europe, the northern Caucasus, Turkey, Syria, and Lebanon, and has been introduced to other locales, including the United States and Australia. A cool-season annual, it is a large species reaching 1 m (3 ft) with 5 cm (2 in) leaves.

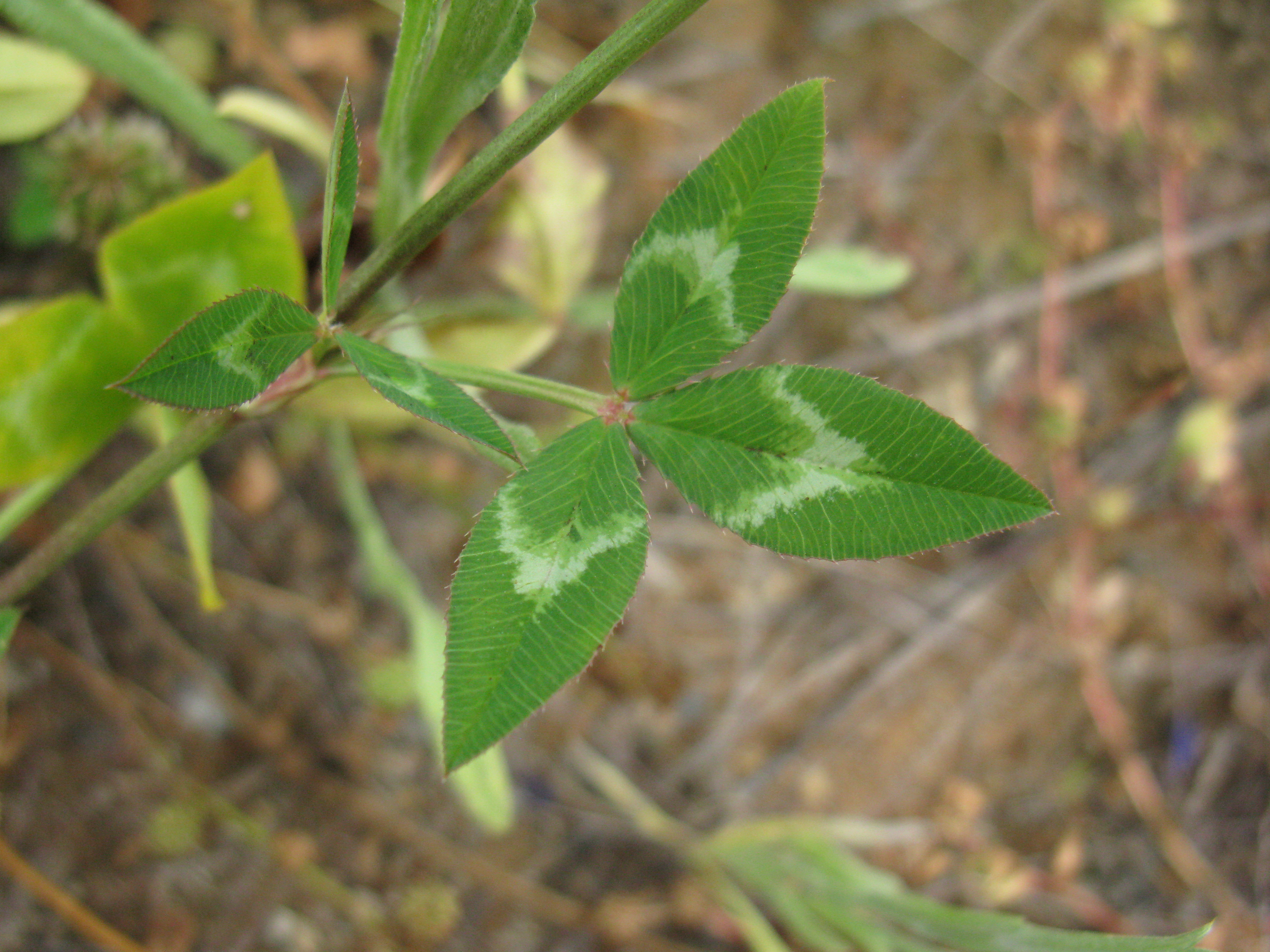
Leaves

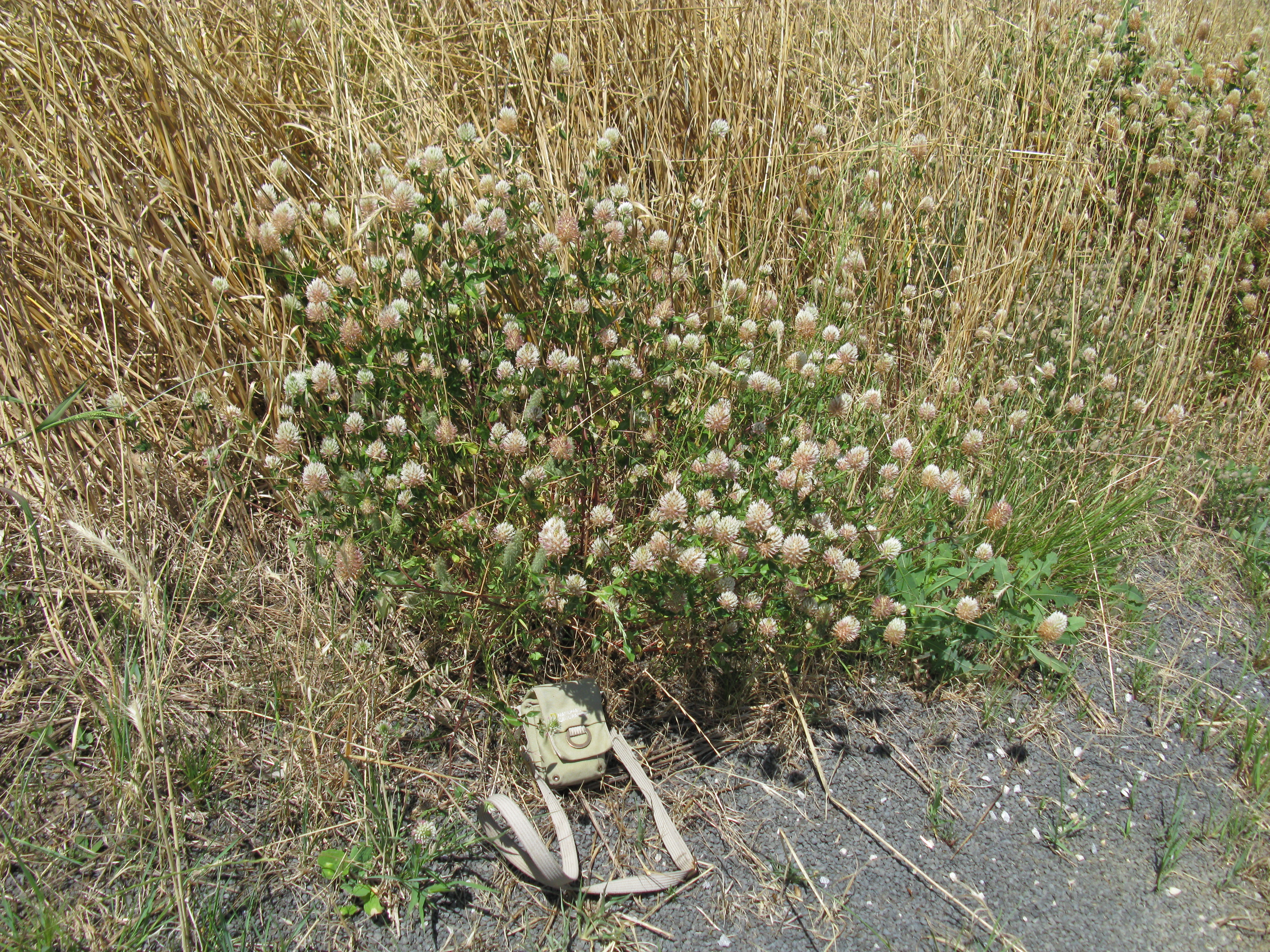
Habit with bag for scale

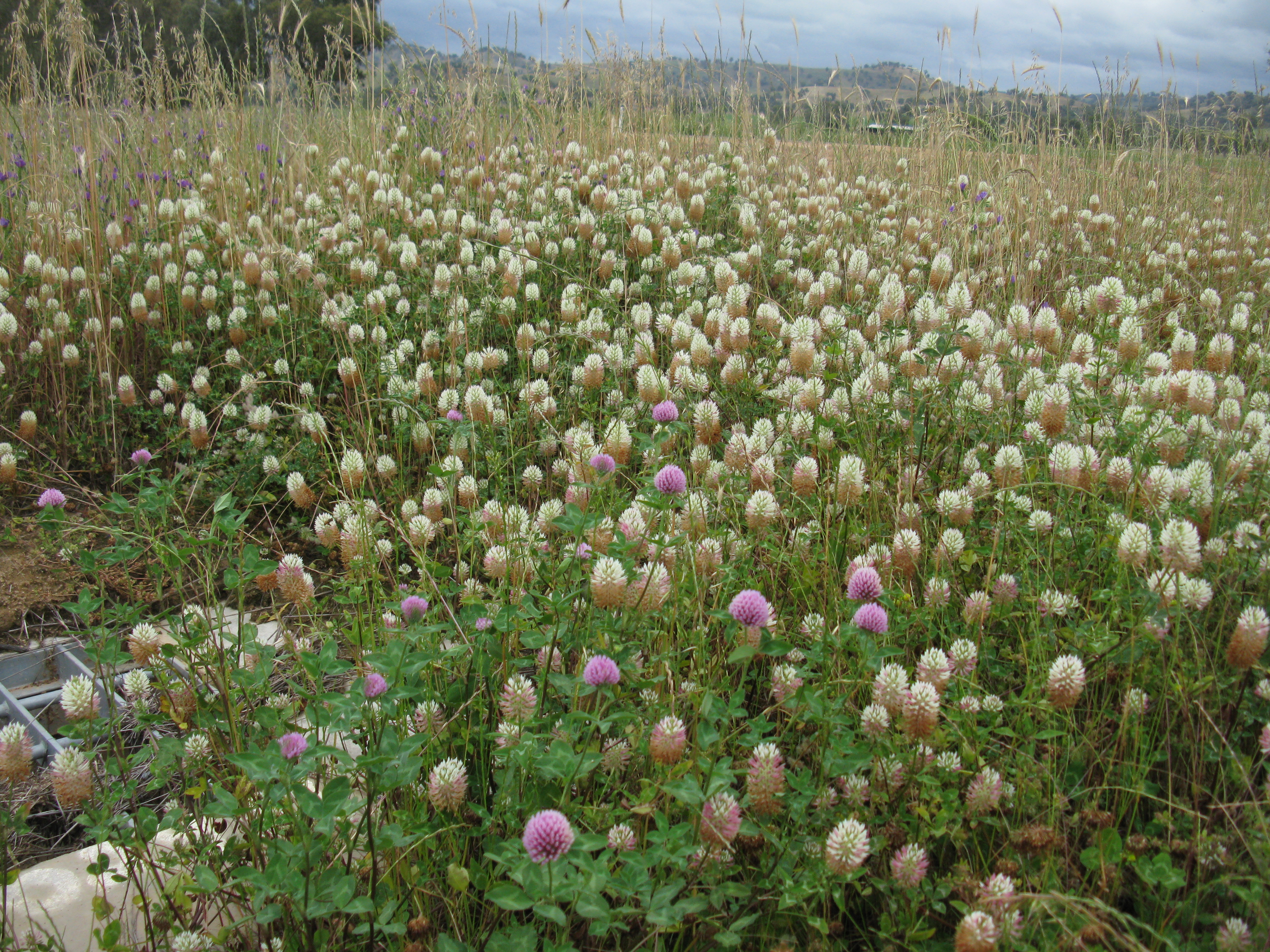
In Australia
