= Matthew Pascoe =

Australian cricketer (born 1977)

Personal information
- Full name: Matthew David Pascoe
- Born: 10 January 1977 (age 49); Sydney, New South Wales, Australia
- Batting: Right-handed
- Bowling: Right-arm fast-medium

Domestic team information
- Years: Team
- 1998–2000: Queensland
- 2002: Tasmania

Career statistics
Competition	FC	LA
Matches	2	3
Runs scored	120	–
Batting average	60.00	–
100s/50s	–/1	–/–
Top score	62	–
Balls bowled	264	132
Wickets	4	6
Bowling average	34.75	19.66
5 wickets in innings	–	–
10 wickets in match	–	–
Best bowling	3/67	3/43
Catches/stumpings	1/–	–/–
- Source: Cricinfo, 2 January 2011

Matthew David Pascoe (born 10 January 1977 in Camperdown, New South Wales, New South Wales) is an Australian cricketer who played for Tasmania and Queensland.

Pascoe played twice for Queensland in the Australian domestic first-class cricket competition during the 1998/99 and 2000/2001 seasons. Ahead of the 2001/02 season, Pascoe moved to Tasmania to establish his first class credentials when unable to break into the Queensland side. However, he only played one List A game for Tasmania and failed to win a permanent place in the Tasmania line-up, despite showing promising pace. He was not offered a new contract after the 2001/2002 season.

== See also ==
- List of Tasmanian representative cricketers
