= Geraldine Pascall =

Australian journalist

Geraldine Pascall (1944 – 17 February 1983) was a flamboyant Sydney-based Australian journalist who died suddenly of a stroke, aged 38.

A graduate of the University of Sydney with a degree in political science, Pascall worked for The Australian (News Ltd) broadsheet newspaper for thirteen years. Pascall was well known for her theatre and film reviews and her food and wine columns. At the time of her death, her best known column was the Indulgence Page, where she wrote on food, wine, fashion and society; though she had also begun writing about Australian Federal politics.

Upon her death, the proceeds from her estate, at the request of her father Fred Pascall, went to establish the Geraldine Pascall Foundation and the Pascall Prize. The Pascall Prize for Australian 'Critic of the Year' is Australia's only major national prize for critical writing and review.
