= José Pascoal Jr. =

Brazilian cyclist (born 1988)

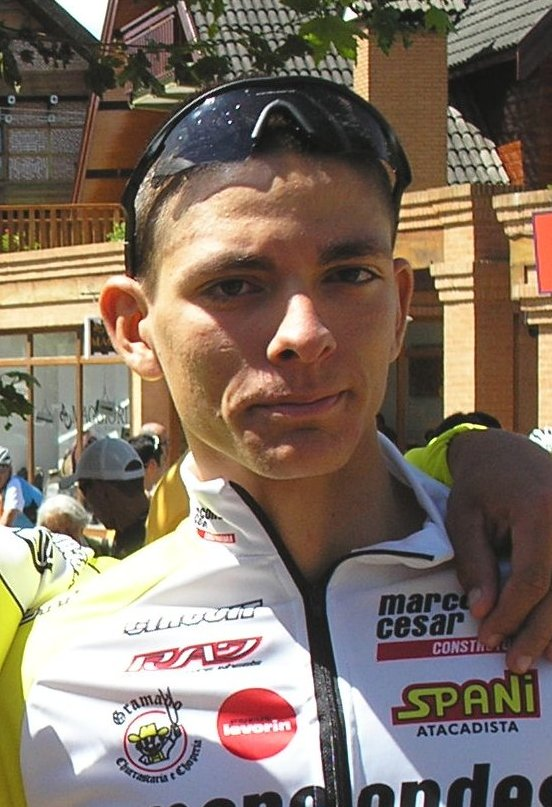

Personal information
- Full name: José Pascoal Alrelio Jr.
- Born: October 20, 1988 (age 37)

Cycling career
- Sport: Cycling
- Current team: Scott–Marcondes Cesar–São José dos Campos
- Discipline: Road
- Role: Rider

Professional team
- 2007–: Scott–Marcondes Cesar–São José dos Campos

José Pascoal Alrelio Jr (born October 20, 1988) is a Brazilian professional racing cyclist for the Scott–Marcondes Cesar–São José dos Campos team.
