= Stratis Paschalis =

Greek poet, novelist and translator (born 1958)

- Born: 1958 (age 67–68); Athens, Greece
- Occupations: poet, novelist, translator
- Writing career
- Period: 1977–

Stratis Paschalis (Greek: Στρατής Πασχάλης; born 1958) is a Greek poet, novelist and translator.

== Biography ==
Paschalis read Political Science at the Law School of the University of Athens. His first collection of poems was published in 1977 with the title Anaktoria by the publishing house Ikaros, with the assistance of the poet Odysseas Elytis whose publisher this was. His "reach out" critical letter in 1976 to Elytis introducing himself and asking for help is within the documents and letters deposited within the archives at The American School of Classical Studies in Athens. Elytis has left most of his letters, documents, and partial manuscripts there until a certain timeframe. Paschalis has been awarded the Kostas and Eleni Ouranis Prize of the Academy of Athens (1994), the State Prize for Translation (1998) and the Poetry Prize for Poetry of the literary journal Diavazo (1999). The poetry of Paschalis is marked by a high degree of eclecticism in words and topic denominators. He is one of the few Greek poets who can write in the "blind field" of the English school of thought.

== Selected works ==
=== Poetry ===
- Aνακτορία, Αθήνα, Ίκαρος, 1977
- Ανασκαφή, Αθήνα, Ίκαρος, 1984
- Μια Νύχτα του Ερμαφρόδιτου, Αθήνα, Ίκαρος, 1989
- Βυσσινιές στο σκοτάδι, Αθήνα, Ίκαρος, 1991
- Άνθη του νερού, Αθήνα, Ίκαρος, 1994
- Μιχαήλ, Αθήνα, Ακρίτας, 1996
- Κωμωδία, Αθήνα, Το Ροδακιό, 1998
- Στίχοι ενός άλλου, (Poems of an other) Athens, Métaichmio, 2003
- Κοιτάζοντας δάση (Looking at the forests), Athens, Métaichmio, 2003
- Εποχή Παραδείσου (Season of Paradise), Athens, Gavriilidis, 2008
- Εκεί θα φυτέψω το Δέντρο (That's where I'll plant the Tree), Garrigue urbaine, "12*2*2",(bilingual Greek-French, in collaboration with Rolf Doppenberg), Geneva, Le Miel de l’Ours, 2012
- Τα εικονίσματα, Athens, Gavriilidis, 2013

=== Prose ===
- Ο άνθρωπος του λεωφορείου (The Man of the Bus), 2006

=== Translations ===
- Jeffrey Carso, 49 Σχόλια στην ποίηση του Οδυσσέα Ελύτη,'Ύψιλον, 1983
- Claude Mossé, Η Αρχαϊκή Ελλάδα, Μορφωτικό Ίδρυμα Εθνικής Τράπεζας, 1986
- Pακίνας, Φαίδρα, Ίκαρος 1990. Γαλλικό Ινστιτούτο Αθηνών (2η έκδοση), 1998.
- Γκυ ντε Μωπασάν, Ο Οξαποδός ( Le Ηοrla)και άλλες ιστορίες, Ίκαρος, 1991.
- Ρακίνας, Ανδρομάχη, Μέγαρο Μουσικής Αθηνών, 1994.
- Ρακίνας, Βερενίκη, Γαλλικό Ινστιτούτο Αθηνών, 1998.
- Pierre Campion, Ο Μαλλαρμέ και η φιλοσοφία, Πατάκης, 1999.
- Gerard Bras, Ο Χέγκελ και η τέχνη, Πατάκης, 2000.
- Arthur Rimbaud, Ένα ποίημα και πέντε επιστολές, Αυτά που λεν στον ποιητή μιλώντας για λουλούδια ( Ce qu'on dit au poete a propos des fleurs), Γαβριηλίδης, 2000.
- Corneille-Kushner, Φρεναπάτη (L'Illusion), Δόλιχος, πρόγραμμα παράστασης, 2000.
- Υi Μunyol, Ο ποιητής, Μεταίχμιο, 2000.
- Edmond Rostand, Οι ρομαντικοί (les Romanesques), έκδοση Δημοτικού Θεάτρου Πάτρας, 2000 .
- Remy de Gourmont, Το πρόβλημα του ύφους, Το Ροδακιό (υπό έκδοση).
