= Pasquale De Bonis =

Italian neurosurgery (born 1979)

Pasquale De Bonis is an Italian Neurosurgeon, Full Professor of Neurosurgery, and Director of the Neurosurgery Residency Program at University of Ferrara, Department of Translational Medicine. He is a top Italian Scientist.

Born on October 5, 1979, at San Giovanni Rotondo, he received MD graduation in Medicine and Surgery in 2004, a Specialization in Neurosurgery in 2009, and a Neuroscience PhD in 2012 at Catholic University of Rome. His contributions are mainly in the fields of Neurotrauma, CSF fluids dynamics, Neuro-oncology and Minimally invasive spine surgery. Among his contributions.

-the description of a novel syndrome, called JEDI syndrome (Jugular Entrapment, Dilated ventricles, Intracranial hypertension): a form of hydrocephalus with intracranial hypertension secondary to a jugular vein compression. The syndrome was described in collaboration with Vascular Surgeon Paolo Zamboni.

-the correlation between development of post-traumatic hydrocephalus after decompressive craniectomy if medial craniectomy margin is too close to the midline.

-a new interpretation, in neuroanatomical key, of the universal judgment fresco in the apse of San Giorgio's Cathedral in Ferrara, Italy, painted around the end of the 16th century by Bastianino, resembling a brain in the sagittal section.

-the first description of a technique to monitor and preserve somatosensory area functions during brain tumor surgery, with awake surgery while patient was playing a clarinet.

De Bonis has published over 180 papers, and is currently Editorial Board Member of International Journals, including Clinical Neurology and Neurosurgery, Biomed Research International, and Journal of Neurosurgical Sciences.
