= Pasquale Bellonio =

Italian painter (1698–1786)

Pasquale Bellonio (1698 – 1786) was an Italian painter of the late-Baroque. He was born in Ortona, province of Chieti, Abruzzo, and painted sacred subjects in a provincial late Baroque art style. There are works by him in the Museo Diocesano of Lanciano, the Museo Diocesano of Ortona and the church of Santa Maria Maggiore in Casoli.
