= Paskal =

Paskal or Paškal is a masculine given name which may refer to:

- Paškal Jukić (1748-1806), preacher, musician, and professor of philosophy from what is now Croatia
- Paskal Milo (born 1949), Albanian historian, politician and leader of the Social Democracy Party of Albania
- Paskal Mitrevski (1912-1978), Greek communist partisan
- Paskal Sotirovski (1927-2003), Macedonian astrophysicists

== See also ==
- Pascal (given name)
