= Paschal =

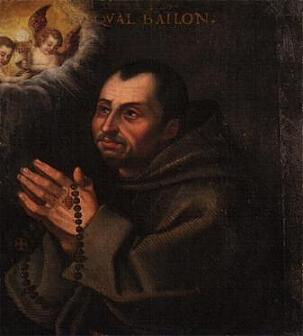
- Saint Pascual Baylón
- Pronunciation: PASS-kull or pahs-KALL
- Gender: masculine

Origin
- Origin: Latin
- Meaning: from Latin Paschalis, associated with Passover (or Easter), from Hebrew Pesach

Other names
- Related names: Pascal, Pascale, Paschalis, Pascoe, Pascual, Pasqual and Pasquale

Paschal is used as a name. Paschal, a variant of Pascal, from Latin Paschalis, is an adjective describing either the Easter or Passover holidays.

People known as Paschal include:

== Popes and religious figures ==
- Antipope Paschal (687), a rival with Theodore for Pope
- Pope Paschal I (died 824), head of the Catholic Church from 817
- Pope Paschal II (11th-century–1118), head of the Catholic Church from 1099
- Antipope Paschal III (1164–1168), Antipope from 1164
- Paschal Baylon (1540–1592), Spanish friar and saint

== People with the surname ==
- Benjamin Edwin Paschal (1895–1974), American baseball outfielder
- Bill Paschal (1921–2003), American football running back
- Bobby Paschal (born 1941), American college basketball coach
- Janet Paschal (born 1956), Contemporary Christian and southern gospel
- James Roy Paschal (1926–2004), NASCAR Grand National and Winston Cup driver
- John Paschal (13th-century–1361), English Bishop
- Thomas M. Paschal (1845–1919), U.S. Representative from Texas

== People with the given name ==
- Paschal Mooney, Irish politician
- Paschal Donohue, Irish politician

== See also ==
- Paschal Lamb (disambiguation)
