= Pascal Island (Western Australia) =

Island in Western Australia

Pascal Island (14°04′08″S 125°38′59″E) is located off the Kimberley coast of Western Australia.
