= Paschal Lamb =

Paschal Lamb may refer to:

- Passover sacrifice (Korban Pesach), a Jewish animal sacrifice
- Lamb of God, a title for Jesus in Christianity
- Paschal lamb (heraldry), a charge used in heraldry

== See also ==
- Sacrificial lamb, a metaphorical reference to a person or animal sacrificed for the common good
