= Paschal (disambiguation) =

Paschal is a surname and given name.

Paschal may also refer to:

- of or pertaining to Easter
- of or pertaining to the Passover
- R. L. Paschal High School in Fort Worth, Texas, U.S.
- Paschal's, an American foodservice company

== See also ==
- Pascal (given name)
- Pascal (surname)
- Pascal (disambiguation)
- Pascha (disambiguation)
- Paschal Lamb (disambiguation)
- Paschall (disambiguation)
- Pascual (disambiguation)
- Paskal (disambiguation)
- Pasqual (disambiguation)
- Pasquale (disambiguation)
- Paschal candle, used liturgies in Western Christianity
- Paschal cycle, the cycle of moveable feasts around Pascha in the Eastern Orthodox Church
- Paschal greeting, an Easter custom
- Paschal Homily, sermon read aloud on the morning of Pascha (Easter)
- Paschal mystery, one of the central concepts of Catholic faith
- Paschal Triduum, three day period to Easter Sunday
- Paschal trikirion, liturgical triple-candlestick
- Paschal troparion, hymn for the celebration of Pascha (Easter)
- Paschal full moon, the Ecclesiastical full moon used in the determination of the date of Easter
- Paska (bread), Easter bread
- Paskha, an Easter dish
