= Pascoe (disambiguation) =

Pascoe is a Cornish given name and surname.

Pascoe may also refer to:

== Places ==
- Pascoe Vale, Victoria, suburb in Melbourne, Victoria, Australia
- Pascoe Vale South, Victoria, suburb in Melbourne, Victoria, Australia

== Other ==
- Pascoe Vale Girls' College, public girls' high school located in Pascoe Vale, Victoria, Australia
- Pascoe Vale SC, soccer club located In Melbourne's North-West in Victoria, Australia
- Pascoe Vale Football Club, Australian rules football club
- James Pascoe Group, a New Zealand-based retail group named after the founder of Pascoes the Jewellers
