= Pascha =

Pascha or spelling variants may refer to:

- Passover, the Aramaic spelling of the Hebrew word Pesach
  - Pesach seder, the festive meal beginning the 14th and ending on the 15th of Nisan
- Easter, central religious feast in the Christian liturgical year
- Pascha (Coptic Church), Holy Week in the Coptic Orthodox Church
- Paskha, an Easter dish served in several Slavic countries
- Paska (bread), an Easter bread served in Ukraine
- Christian observance of Passover, a holiday celebrated by a small number of Christians
- German spelling of Pasha
- Pascha (brothel), a large brothel in Cologne, Germany
- Edmund Pascha (1714–1772), preacher, organist, and composer
- Pascha (ship), a ship sailed by Francis Drake

== See also ==
- Pasch (surname)
- Paschal (disambiguation)
- Pascal (disambiguation)
- Pasha (disambiguation)
