= Pasco =

Pasco may refer to:

== People ==
- Pasco (name)

== Places ==
=== Australia ===
- Pasco Island Group, Tasmania:
  - Middle Pasco Islands
  - North Pasco Island
  - South Pasco Island

=== Argentina ===
- Pasco (Buenos Aires Metro), a station, named after the battle

=== Peru ===
- Cerro de Pasco, city
- Pasco Province
- Department of Pasco

=== United States ===
- Pasco, Ohio
- Pasco, Washington, one of the Tri-Cities
- Pasco County, Florida

== Other uses ==
- PASCO, the airline callsign of Pacific Coastal Airlines
- Pasco (ship), a ship sailed by Francis Drake

== See also ==
- Pascoe (disambiguation)
