= Pascoe =

- Gender: masculine

Origin
- Origin: Cornish (from Latin)
- Meaning: "associated with Passover (or Easter)"

Other names
- Related names: Pasco, Pasko, Pascal, Pascale, Pascalle, Paschal, Paskal, Paskel, Paschalis, Pascaline, Pasquale, Pasqual, Pascual

Pascoe is a Cornish given name and surname which means "Easter children" from the Cornish language Pask, cognate of Latin Pascha ("Easter"). Pascoe is a Cornish pet form of the name Pascal, introduced by the Norman knights into England after the Norman Conquest started in 1066, and derives from the Latin paschalis, which means "relating to Easter" from Latin Pascha ("Easter"). Alternative spellings are Pasco, Pascow and Pascho. Pascoe is the most common Cornish name.

"Pascoe" is also a Russian, Ukrainian and Macedonian name as it is the modern adaptation of the Slavic name "Pasko" (Macedonian: Паско; Russian or Ukrainian: Пасько) due to 18th and 19th century migration from Eastern Europe, creating the alternative Romanised spelling.

Pasco is found as surname in Australia, Canada, United Kingdom, United States and France. Pasco is also a rare Italian surname found in Northern Italy: Piedmont, Lombardy, Veneto and Tuscany. Both the Italian and the Cornish surnames share the same Latin root and derive from the Latin word Pascha.

== Notable people with this given name ==
- Pascoe Bioletti (fl. 1913–1914), English criminal who attempted to influence the results of English football games
- Pasco Bowman II (born 1933), American senior federal judge
- Pascoe Charles Glyn (1833–1904), British businessman and Liberal politician
- Pascoe Grenfell (1761–1838), British businessman and politician
- Pascoe Grenfell Hill (1804–1882), British priest in the Church of England and an author
- John Pascoe Grenfell, (1800–1869), British officer in the Brazilian Navy
- William Pascoe Crook (1775–1846), British missionary, schoolmaster and pastor

== Notable people with the surname Pascoe ==
- Alan Peter Pascoe (born 1947), British athlete
- B. Lynn Pascoe (born 1943), Under-Secretary-General of the United Nations for Political Affairs
- Bruce Pascoe (born 1947), Australian writer
- Colin Pascoe (born 1965), Welsh football player
- Chris Pascoe (born 1966), English humorous author
- Derek Pascoe (born 1957), British musician, father of Sara
- Eva Pascoe (born 1964), Polish born British internet entrepreneur
- Francis Polkinghorne Pascoe (1813–1893), Cornish entomologist
- George Pascoe-Watson (born 1966), British journalist
- J. Ernest Pascoe (1900–1972), Canadian politician, farmer and journalist
- Joaquín Gamboa Pascoe (1922–2016), Mexican trade union leader and politician
- John Pascoe (born 1948), Chief Federal Magistrate of Australia
- John Pascoe Fawkner (1792–1869), Australian pioneer, businessman and politician
- Keith Pascoe (born 1959), British musician and conductor
- Len Pascoe (born 1950), Australian cricketer
- Mal Pascoe (1933–2020), Australian footballer and coach
- Matthew Pascoe (born 1977), Australian cricketer
- McKenna "Bear" Pascoe (born 1986), American football player
- Michael Pascoe, Australian financial journalist
- Paul Pascoe (1908–1976), New Zealand architect
- Peggy Pascoe (1954–2010), American professor of history and ethnic studies
- Peter Pascoe (born 1953), Australian Paralympic shooter
- Robert Pascoe, (born 1932), British Adjutant-General to the Forces
- Russell Pascoe (1940–1963), third-last prisoner to be executed in a British prison
- Sara Pascoe (born 1981), British comedian, daughter of Derek Pascoe
- Sophie Pascoe (born 1993), New Zealand paralympic swimmer
- Thomas Pascoe (1846/48–1938), English migrant to California
- Thomas Pascoe (politician) (1859–1939), member of South Australia's Legislative Council

=== Fictional characters ===
- Harris Pascoe, a recurring character in the Poldark series of books and television
- Peter Pascoe, in Dalziel and Pascoe, series of crime novels by Reginald Hill
  - also in Dalziel and Pascoe, BBC series based on the novels
- Jackie Webb (née Pascoe), fictional character on television series Footballers' Wives, played by Gillian Taylforth
- Kyle Pascoe, in British drama Footballers' Wives, played by Gary Lucy
- Pascoe, the village pastor in Dame Ethel Smyth’s opera The Wreckers
- Victor Pascow, wreck victim in Stephen King's "Pet Cemetery" .

== Notable people with the surname Pasco ==
- Crawford Atchison Denman Pasco (1818–1898) Royal Navy officer and Australian police magistrate during the 19th century, son of John Pasco
- Isabelle Pasco (born 1966), French actress and model
- John Pasco (1774–1853), British Admiral of Royal Navy
- Merlin Owen Pasco (1892–1918), New Zealand entomologist
- Richard Edward Pasco (1926–2014), British stage, screen and TV actor
- Samuel Pasco (1834–1917), United States Senator from Florida

== See also ==
- Pascoe (disambiguation)
- Pasko (name)
