= Pascual =

- Pronunciation: [paˈskwal]
- Gender: masculine

Origin
- Origin: Latin
- Meaning: "associated with Passover (or Easter)"
- Region of origin: Spanish-speaking countries

Other names
- Related names: Pasquale, Pasqual, Pascuale, Pascal, Paschal, Pascale, Pascalle, Paschalis, Pascoe

Pascual is a Spanish given name and surname, cognate of Italian name Pasquale, Portuguese name Pascoal and French name Pascal. In Catalan-speaking areas (including Andorra, Valencia, and Balearic Islands) Pascual has the variant Pasqual.

Pascual, like Pasquale/Pasqual/Pascal, derives from the Latin paschalis or pashalis, which means "relating to Easter", from Latin pascha ("Easter"), Greek Πάσχα, Aramaic pasḥā, in turn from the Hebrew pesach, which means "to be born on, or to be associated with, Passover day". Since the Hebrew holiday Passover coincides closely with the later Christian holiday of Easter, the Latin word came to be used for both occasions. In the Katalani Hebrew tradition the name is given to the first born male child.

Notable people with the name include:

== Given name ==
- Pascual de Andagoya (1495–1548), Spanish Basque conquistador
- Pascual Jordan (1902–1980), German theoretical and mathematical physicist of Spanish ancestors
- Pascual Madoz (1806–1870), Spanish politician and statistician
- Pascual Orozco (1882–1915), Mexican revolutionary leader
- Pascual Ortiz Rubio (1877–1963), Mexican president during the Maximato government
- Pascual Romero (born 1980), American musician and film producer

== Surname ==
Pascual
Origin
- Origin: Latin, in turn of Hebrew
- Meaning: related to Easter
- Region of origin: Spain, Neo-Latin Languages

Other names
- Variant forms: Paschal, Pasquale, Pasqual, Pascal

- Alfredo Pascual (born 1948), Filipino businessman and former president of the University of the Philippines
- Audrey Pascual (born 2004), Spanish para-alpine skier
- Bernard Pascual (born 1967), French footballer
- Beatriz Pascual Rodríguez, Spanish racewalker
- Camilo Alberto Pascual Lus (born 1934), Cuban baseball player
- Carolina Pascual (born 1976), Spanish rhythmic gymnast
- Claudia Pascual (born 1972), Chilean anthropologist and politician
- Emerson Pascual (born 1972), Filipino politician and businessman
- Ernest Benach y Pascual (born 1959), President of the Catalan Parliament
- Griselda Pascual i Xufré (1926–2001) Catalan mathematical researcher and teacher
- Jake Pascual (born 1988), Filipino basketball player
- Jorge Pascual (born 2003), Spanish footballer
- Peter Pascual (died 1299), Spanish theologian
- Piolo Pascual (born 1977), Filipino actor, model, musician and film producer
- Ricardo de Pascual (1940–2026), Mexican actor and comedian
- Ronald Pascual (born 1988), Filipino basketball player
- Virginia Ruano Pascual (born 1973), Spanish professional female tennis player

== See also ==
- Convent of San Pascual, a royal monastery in Aranjuez, Madrid, Spain
- Pascual Boing, a Mexican fruit juice and soft drink company
- Pasqual (disambiguation)
- Pasquale (disambiguation)
- Pascal (disambiguation)
