= Pascal =

Pascal, Pascal's or PASCAL may refer to:

== People and fictional characters ==
- Pascal (given name), including a list of people with the name
- Pascal (surname), including a list of people and fictional characters with the name
  - Blaise Pascal, French mathematician, physicist, inventor, philosopher, writer and theologian

== Places ==
- Pascal (crater), a lunar crater
- Pascal Island (Antarctica)
- Pascal Island (Western Australia)

== Science and technology ==
- Pascal (unit), the SI unit of pressure
- Pascal (programming language), a programming language developed by Niklaus Wirth
  - Microsoft Pascal
  - Turbo Pascal
  - Apple Pascal and Apple Object Pascal
  - Free Pascal
  - Delphi
  - Oxygene
- PASCAL (database), a bibliographic database maintained by the Institute of Scientific and Technical Information
- Pascal (microarchitecture), codename for a microarchitecture developed by Nvidia

== Other uses ==
- French cruiser Pascal (1895–1911)
- French submarine Pascal (Q138) (1931–1942)
- Pascal and Maximus, fictional characters in Tangled
- Pascal blanc, a French white wine grape
- Pascal College, secondary education school in Zaandam, the Netherlands
- Pascal, trade name of J. Pascal's Furniture and Hardware, Montreal, Canada
- PAS/CAL, a pop band from Detroit, Michigan

== See also ==
- Pascall (disambiguation)
- Paschal (disambiguation)
- Pascual (disambiguation)
- Paskal (disambiguation)
- Pasqual (disambiguation)
- Pasquale (disambiguation)
