= Order of the Red Banner (Hungary) =

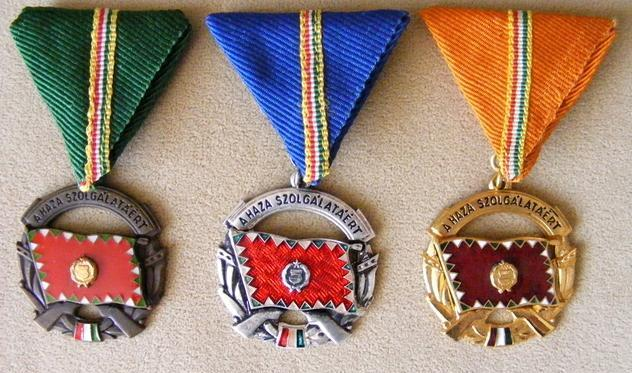
- Type: single-grade order
- Awarded for: Heroism in combat
- Presented by: Hungarian People's Republic
- Eligibility: Hungarian and foreign citizens, military units and formations, military schools, and institutions
- Status: No longer awarded
- Established: 1953
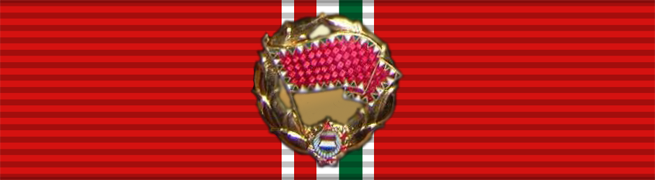
- Ribbon of the award
- Related: Order of the Red Banner (Soviet)

The Order of the Red Banner (Hungarian: Vörös Zászló Érdemrend) was a military decoration of the Hungarian People's Republic. It was established in 1953 with the aim of rewarding personnel of the Hungarian People's Army.

== Recipients ==
- Anatoly Konstantinov
- Georgy Beregovoy
- Ivan Lyudnikov
- Josip Broz Tito
- Konstantin Vershinin
- Mikhail Kazakov
- Nikolai Lyashchenko
- Nikolai Skomorokhov
- Pavel Batov
- Pavel Kutakhov
- Butochiyn Tsog
- Wojciech Jaruzelski
