= Zaporizhzhia Polytechnic National University =

Public university in Zaporizhzhia, Ukraine

Coordinates: 47°49′03″N 35°11′04″E

- Національний університет «Запорізька політехніка»
- Motto: Vivere est cogitare
- Type: Public
- Established: 1900
- Affiliations: Ministry of Education and Science of Ukraine
- Academic affiliations: Coalition for Advancing Research Assessment
- Rector: Viktor Hreshta
- Students: 7403
- Location: Zaporizhzhia, Ukraine
- Campus: Urban
- Website: Official website
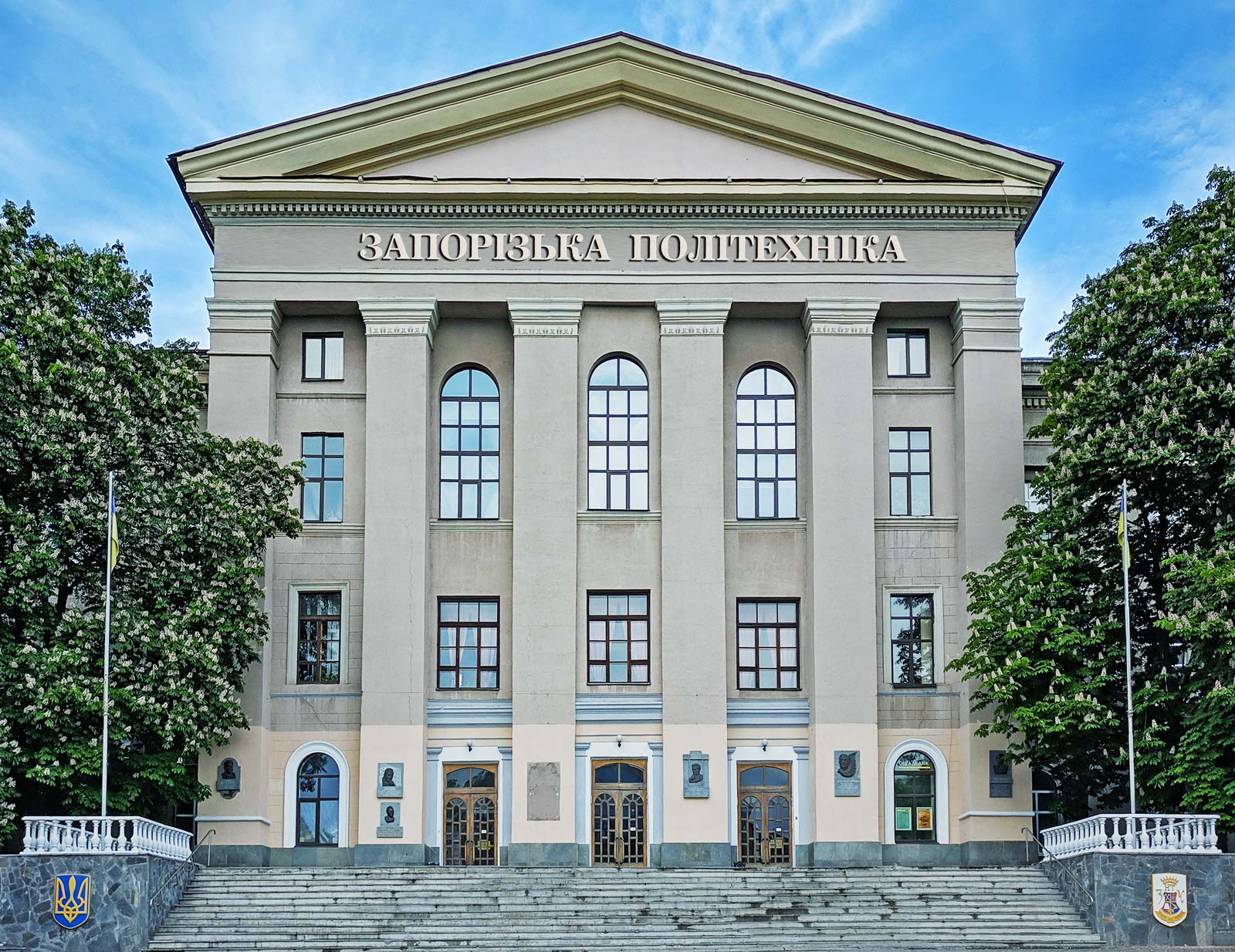

The Zaporizhzhia Polytechnic National University (Ukrainian: Національний університет «Запорізька політехніка») is a Ukrainian state-sponsored university in Zaporizhzhia in Ukraine.

== History ==
=== Russian Empire ===
Zaporizhzhia Polytechnic National University started in 1900 as a seven-year mechanical technical vocational college, preparing technic-mechanics specialists. Simultaneously with the educational work, the construction of the main premises was carried out. Very quickly the main three-storied building was built. The educational building housed classrooms, physics and mechanical offices, laboratories, an assembly hall, and a store selling ready-made products.

By the end of its first decade, 240 students could attend simultaneously. Graduates from the college successfully worked at machine-construction enterprises promoting the rise of the colleges' reputation. It was considered to be one of the best not only in Ukraine, but across Europe.

=== USSR ===
In 1920 the college was reorganized into Zaporizhzhia Industrial Technical School with a four year curriculum. From November 1922 to 1930 the industrial school was the educational enterprise training engineer-mechanics for agricultural machine construction and general machine construction. Many graduates became leading industrial specialists and statesmen. In 1930 the technical school was reorganized into Zaporizhzhya Agricultural Engineering Institute training specialists in four subjects: tractor and agricultural engineering, metal treatment and foundry.

In the 10 years before the start of World War II, 782 people got engineering diplomas and worked at Zaporizhzhia plants. During the war, more than 500 students and lecturers went to the front, 52 people studied at the artillery academy named after F.E. Dzerzhinsky, 30 people finished accelerated courses of armored academy. More than 300 students and lecturers were awarded State orders and medals. More than 50 graduates of the technical school did not return from the front.

After the liberation of Zaporizhia from German occupation in 1944, the Zaporizhia Automechanic Institute was organized and three years later it became Zaporizhzhia Agricultural Engineering Institute, until 1957 when it was renamed Zaporizhzhia Machine Construction Institute (ZMI). In 1980 ZMI received the Badge of Honor for the preparation of highly qualified professionals. Between 1930-1990 institute prepared 40,000 engineers, including 825 for foreign countries.

=== Ukraine ===
Zaporizhzhia State Technical University was created by a Cabinet of Ministers of Ukraine decision dated 20 April 1994. In August 2001, according to Ukrainian President's Decree ZSTU was awarded the status of a National institution. During 2006-2007, separate structural units: Berdyansk machine construction college, Tokmak mechanical school, Zaporizhzhia college of radio electronics, Zaporizhzhia electrotechnical college and Humanitarian college entered the university.

== Campuses and buildings ==
University campus occupies territory of 14,2 hectares including:

- Educational zone – 7.8 hectares;
- Living zone with hostels – 2.25 hectares;
- Recreation zone – 3.8 hectares;
- Other – 0.35 hectares.

Those territories include 7 educational buildings, sport complex, administrative and business buildings. There are 5 hostels in the university with living space of 25 000 sq.m. ensuring 100% students accommodation. One of the hostels is used for married students’ couples.

The main building of the university hosts canteen, assembly hall, editorial and publishing departments, center of computer technologies as well as auditoriums, laboratories, computer classes. There are 43 computer classes governed by faculties and chairs. Computers are also used in many of university's laboratories, where laboratory equipment is combined with computers used for investigations of different algorithms and technologies. Total number of modern computers used for educational purposes equals 1430 units. Wi-Fi technologies are introduced in the university.

Besides. University leads Ukrainian high school using NTUU “KPI” cluster. Scientific supervisor of supercomputer calculation center A. Petrenko showed the application of cluster power by different organizations. According to diagram showed in this report in 2009 ZNTU used more than 15 percent processing time of NTUU “KPI” cluster.

University owns four scientific lending libraries, 8 reading halls with 454 seats. Library computer net equipped by 2 servers, 7 scanners, 7 printers, 2 copy machines and 76 computers connected into joint communicational net. Electronic library effectively increase sticking of funds with electronic text-books and methodical materials created by university lecturers.

== Institutes and faculties ==
There are 6 institutes, 12 departments and center for skill improvement, extension and advanced courses.

=== Institute of Machine Construction ===
(director – L.I. Ivshenko, D.Sci., Prof.)

==== Machine Construction Department ====
(dean – V.I. Glushko, Cand. Sci., Assist.Prof.)

prepares professionals in the following specialties:

- Machine Construction Technology;
- Aviation Engines and Power plants Production Technology;
- Metal-cutting Lathes and Systems;
- Machine building Constructions Plastic making Equipment and Technology; Winding, Construction, Road Building Machines and Equipment;
- engines and aircraft energy units.

==== Transportation and Logistics Department ====
(dean – V.F. Kozirev, Cand. Sci., Assist.Prof.)

prepares professionals in the following specialties:

- Internal Combustion Engines;
- Wheel and Caterpillar Vehicles;
- Logistics and Transportation Management;
- Traffic Organization and Regulation;
- Transportation Systems.

=== Institute of Physics and Engineering ===
(director – V.V. Luniov, D.Sci., Prof.)

==== Physics and Engineering Department ====
(dean – O.V. Klimov, Cand Sci. Prof.)

prepares professionals in the following specialties:

- Foundry Technologies of Ferrous and Nonferrous Metalsand Alloys;
- Foundry Equipment and Technology;
- Applied Material Science;
- Welding Technology and Equipment;
- Details and Constructions Restoration and Wearability.

==== Electrical Engineering Department ====
(dean – V.P. Metelsky, Cand. Sci., Prof.)

prepares professionals in the following specialties:

- Electrical Machines and Apparatuses;
- Electric Drive and Electromechanical Automation Systems;
- Electrotechnical Systems of Energy Consumption;
- Energy Management;
- Electromechanical Equipment of Power-Consuming Plants.

=== Institute of Information Science and Radioelectronics ===
(director – D.M. Piza, D. Sci., Prof.)

==== Radioengineering Department ====
(dean – V.S. Kabak., Cand. Sci., Assist. Prof.)

prepares professionals in the following specialties:

- Radio Engineering;
- Computer Systems and Networks;
- Information Technical Protection Systems and Information processing automation;
- Informational and Communication Systems Security, Electronics;
- Radio-electronic devices and equipment;
- Intellectual technologies of microsystems radioelectronic technics;
- Microelectronics and Semi-Conductor Devices;
- Quality, Standardization and Certification.

==== Information Science and Computer Engineering Department ====
(dean – M.M. Kasyan, Cand.Sci., Assist.Prof.)

prepares professionals in the following specialties:

- Computer Systems and Networks;
- Customized Computer Systems;
- Systems Software;
- Systems of Artificial Intellect;
- Engineering of Software;
- Information Technology Design;
- Systems Analysis and Management.

=== Institute of Economics and Humanities ===
(director – P.V. Gudz, D.Sci. Prof.)

==== Economics and Management Department ====
(dean – V.V. Korolkov, Cand. Sci. Assist. Prof.)

prepares professionals in the following specialties:

- Organizational Management and Administration;
- Marketing;
- Finance and Credits;

Accounting and Audit.

==== Humanities Department ====
(dean – M.V. Dedkov, Cand.Sci., Assist.Prof.)

prepares specialists in the following specialties:

- International Relations;
- Translation;
- Design.

=== Law and Management Institute ===
(director – V.M. Zaytseva, Cand. Sci. Prof.)

==== International Tourism and Management Department ====
(dean – E.A. Vasylieva, Cand. Sci., Assist. Prof.)

prepares specialists in the following specialties:

- tourism management,
- human resources and work economy management.

==== Humanity and Law Department ====
(dean – T.A. Hayvoronskaya, Cand. Sci. Assist.Prof.)

prepares specialists in the following specialties:

- law science;
- psychology;
- sociology;
- Journalism.

==== Physical Culture and Sport Management Department ====
(dean – I.V. Pushina, Cand. Sci. Assist. Prof.)

prepares specialists in the following specialties:

- physical training;
- physical rehabilitation

=== Institute of Professional Training ===
(director – S.T. Yarimbash, Cand. Sci., Assist. Prof.)

==== Common Technical Department ====
(dean – E.P. Sokolov, Cand. Sci., Assist. Prof.);

Center for skill improvement, extension and Advanced Courses (director – N.N. Sytnikov, Cand. Sci., Assist. Prof.) prepares specialists in the following specialties:

- Computer Systems and Networks;
- Automation Systems Software;
- Organizational Management;
- Finance and Credits;
- Marketing;
- Accounting and Audit.

== Famous alumni ==
- Sergiy Byelikov – former ZNTU Rector, Dr. Tech. Sci, Prof. Distinguished educator of Ukraine, Laureate of State Award in science and Technics
- Vyacheslav Bohuslayev – industrial, scientific, public and political activist, Hero of Ukraine, People's Deputy of Ukraine. Since 1994 – head of administrative board, director-general JSV “Motor Sich”. Since 2011 – Head of directors council of JSV “Motor Sich”
- Mykola Evdokimenko – head of administrative board of JSV “Zaporizhzhia automobile plant”, deputy of Zaporizhzhia district council of VI convocation, vice-chairman of permanent commission on economical development, industrial policy and investments of district council
- Yevhen Kartashov – Ukrainian statesman, Governor of Zaporizhzhia Oblast (1999, 2001-2003), Extraordinary and Plenipotentiary Ambassador to Kazakhstan, Zaporizhzhia mayor (2003-2010)
- Igor Kleiner – director – general of JST “Zaporizhtransformator” plant, deputy of Zaporizhzhia district council for Party of Regions Игорь Саулович Клейнер
- Volodymyr Kuratchenko – director-general of production joint “Radiopribor” (1990-1997), Governor of Zaporizhzhia Oblast (1998-1999, 1999-2000), First Vice Prime Minister of Ukraine (1999)
- Viktor Lakomsky – Associate Member of National Academy of sciences of Ukraine, head of department of plasmatechnologies in Electricwelding institute named after E.Paton
- Anatoly Mayoretz – soviet state and economical person, Deputy of Supreme Soviet of USSR (10-11 convocation), candidate of General Committee Communist Party member 1981–1986, member of General Committee Party 1986-1990
- Valery Malev – Ukrainian statesman, member of National Security and Defense Council of Ukraine (1996-2002)
- Vasil Omelchenko – director of Zaporizhzhia Motorbuilding Plant (1958-1974), director general of Zaporizhzhia production joint “Motorbuilding” (1974-1987), Dr. Sci.(1977), Prof.(1982), Honored Scientist of Ukraine (1978), Hero of Socialist Labour (1966), Honored Aviabuilder (1986)
- Georgy Peychev – first deputy chief, chief engineer of state enterprise “Zaporizhzhia machinebuilding construction bureau Ivchenko-Progress”
- Boris Petrov – Governor of Zaporizhzhia Oblast (2010-2011), member of Political Council of the Party of Regions
- Igor Presnyak – Director of State Enterprise “Scientific- industrial complex Iskra”
- Yury Shulte – Dr. Tech. Sci., Prof., Associate member of Academy of Science of Ukraine, Laureate of Lenin's Award, Honored Specialist in Science and Technics.
- Vladimir Sudets - Marshal of the aviation, commander of the corps and armies during World War II.
- Vlad Levykin – CEO and founder of Skyrora, a UK private space company that specialises in design and manufacture of modular disassemblable rocket launch vehicles.

== Awards and reputation ==
Recent years several estimations of high school activities were done both by employers and on national level. In such ratings best high schools take part. According to integrated estimations Zaporizhzhia National Technical University gets marks above medium in Ukraine. University is a leading higher education center in South East of Ukraine. Possessing highest IV level of accreditation. Prepares highly qualified specialists in 51 specialties of technical, computer, economical and humanitarian directions.

== See also ==
List of universities in Ukraine
