= Mikhail Vorobyev =

Mikhail Vorobyev may refer to:

- Mikhail Vorobyov (engineer) (1896–1957), Soviet military engineer
- Mikhail Vorobyev (ice hockey) (born 1997), Russian ice hockey player
