= Aleksandr Yefimov =

Soviet senior military officer

- Александр Николаевич Ефимов
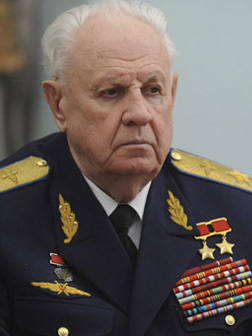
- Born: 6 February 1923; Kantemirovka, Voronezh Governorate, RSFSR, USSR
- Died: 31 August 2012 (aged 89); Moscow, Russian Federation
- Military career
- Allegiance: Soviet Union
- Branch: Soviet Air Force
- Service years: 1941–1993
- Rank: Marshal of Aviation
- Conflicts: World War II
- Awards: Hero of the Soviet Union (twice)

Aleksandr Nikolaevich Yefimov (Russian: Александр Николаевич Ефимов; 6 February 1923 – 31 August 2012) was a senior military officer who served as Commander-in-Chief of the Soviet Air Force from 1984 to 1990. Earlier in his life, he had been an Il-2 pilot for which he was twice awarded the title Hero of the Soviet Union.

== Early life ==
Yefimov was born on 6 February 1923 to a working-class family of Russian Don Cossacks in Kantemirovka; his father was a railway worker. He spent most of his childhood in Millerovo, where he completed his tenth grade of school in 1940. There he developed a passion for aviation, joining the local Osoaviakhim glider school, where he made his first flight on 18 August 1938. He then went on to graduate from the Voroshilovgrad aeroclub in May 1941 and entered the military that month. After graduating from the Voroshilovgrad Military Aviation School of Pilots in June 1942 he was assigned as a pilot to the 10th Reserve Aviation Regiment, based in Kamenka.

== World War II ==
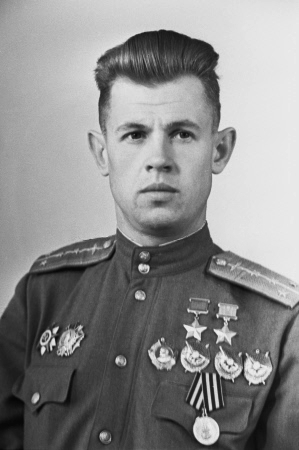
Yefimov in 1945

Having been deployed to the warfront in August 1942, he flew as a pilot in the 594th Assault Aviation Regiment until being transferred to 198th Assault Regiment in November. There he rose up through the ranks from being an ordinary pilot to flight commander, deputy squadron commander, and eventually squadron commander. In June 1944 he was nominated for the title Hero of the Soviet Union for having flown 100 sorties, and was awarded it on 26 October 1944. His actions during an attack on Danzig airfield on 25 March 1945 were described by Marshal Fedor Falaleyev in a book of essays praising pilots published by a military academy after the war. In that mission, he led a group of 16 Il-2 in attacking a hangar, resulting in the destruction of 14 enemy aircraft. Two days later he completed his two-hundredth sortie; in that flight he led a group of eight Il-2s in taking out three tanks, four anti-tank guns, two mortars, and killing dozens of enemy personnel. On 6 April 1945 he was nominated for a second gold star for having tallied 200 sorties. By then he had transferred to the 62nd Assault Aviation Regiment as head navigator, but he continued to fly in combat, flying his later sortie on 5 May 1945 over Świnoujście, for a final tally of 222 sorties. After the war he was awarded the title Hero of the Soviet Union for a second time on 18 August 1945.

== Postwar ==
Yefimov remained posted in the 62nd Regiment until July 1946, but after graduating from the Monino Air Force Academy in 1951 he took command of the 167th Guards Assault Aviation Regiment. In 1954, he was promoted to deputy commander of the 10th Guards Assault Aviation Training Division, but he did not remain there for very long since he graduated from the Military Academy of General Staff in 1957 and then became commander of the 339th Fighter-bomber Aviation Division. In 1958, he switched to command of the 6th Guards Bomber Aviation Division, where he remained until October 1959. He then became the deputy commander for combat training of the 30th Air Army; there, he was promoted to general major in 1960 and later became the deputy commander of the unit. Upon leaving the 30th Air Army in 1964 he took command of the 57th Air Army, and the next year he was promoted to lieutenant-general. In February 1969 he was promoted to colonel-general, and the next month he was made deputy commander-in-chief of the air force; he was eventually promoted to the rank of marshal in 1975. During those two decades he made multiple trips to Egypt and Syria due to the Arab-Israeli conflicts. During his travels he befriended then-aviator Hosni Mubarak, who later became the president of Egypt. After Marshal Pavel Kutakhov died in 1984, Yefimov took over as commander of the air force. At that time the Soviet Union was involved in the fighting against Islamist guerrillas, so during his tenure he supported the development of the Su-25 as a solution to the different nature of the war. Shortly before the end of his tenure in 1990 the air force reached its height of power, amassing over 13,000 planes and 6,000 helicopters. Afterwards he was the chairman of the state commission of the use of airspace and air traffic control before he retired in August 1993. During his career he flew the Il-2, Il-10, Il-14, Il-28, Li-2, Mi-1, Mi-4, MiG-15, MiG-17, MiG-21, Tu-104, and Tu-124, accumulating over 3000 flight hours. Before the dissolution of the Soviet Union he was also active in politics; as a member of the Communist party, he was a deputy in the Supreme Soviet of the USSR and several SSRs. While retired he remained socially active, participating in a variety of veterans organizations and serving in the civil chamber of Russia from 2006 to 2010. He died in Moscow on 31 August 2012 and was buried in the Novodevichy Cemetery.

== Awards and honors ==
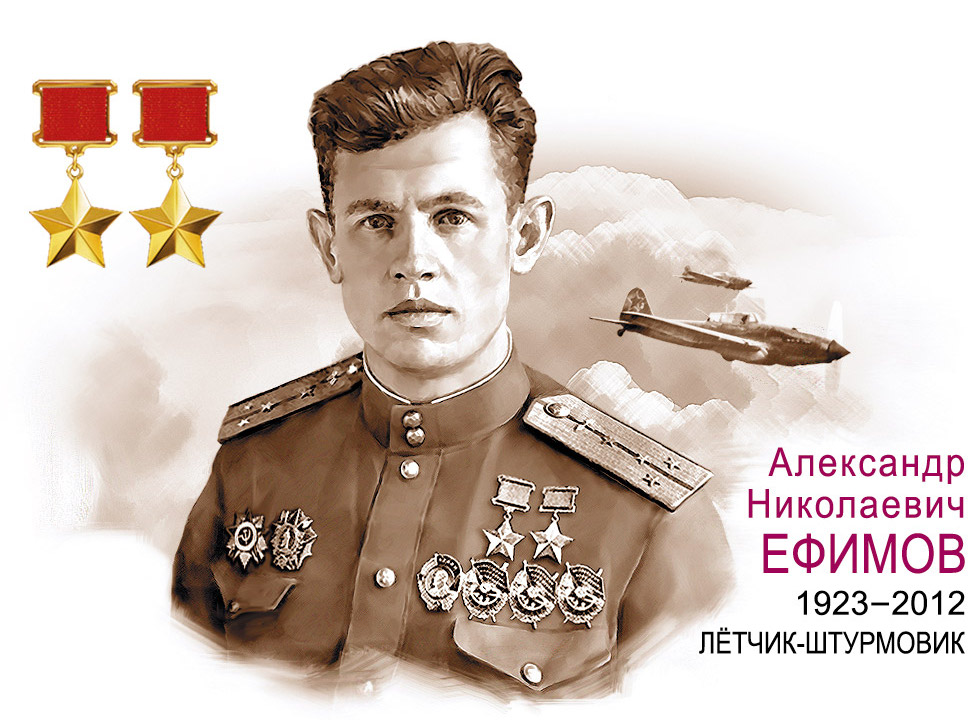
Yefimov on a 2023 postal cover of Russia

Soviet

- Twice Hero of the Soviet Union (26 October 1944 and 18 August 1945)
- Honoured Military Pilot of the USSR (17 August 1970)
- USSR State Prize (3 November 1984)
- Three Order of Lenin (26 October 1944 and 31 October 1967, and 4 September 1981)
- Order of the October Revolution (19 February 1988)
- Five Order of the Red Banner (29 May 1943, 21 February 1944, 24 October 1944, 21 February 1969, 5 February 1973)
- Order of Alexander Nevsky (1 August 1944)
- Two Order of the Patriotic War 1st class (5 November 1943 and 11 March 1985)
- Order of the Red Star (30 December 1956)
- Order "For Service to the Homeland in the Armed Forces of the USSR" 3rd class (17 February 1976)

Other states

- Poland – Order of the Cross of Grunwald (6 April 1946)
- Poland – Order of Polonia Restituta (6 October 1973)
- Poland – Order of Merit of the Republic of Poland (27 March 1985)
- Mongolia – Order of the Red Banner (6 July 1971)
- Peru – Order of Aeronautical Merit (November 1972)
- Bulgaria – Order of 9 September 1944 (14 September 1974)
- Bulgaria – Order of Georgi Dimitrov (22 January 1985)
- Syria – Order of Friendship and Cooperation (15 May 1988)
- Russia – Order "For Merit to the Fatherland" 2nd, 3rd, and 4th class (4th class – 16 January 1998; 3rd class – 6 February 2003; 2nd class – 1 February 2008)
- Russia – Order of Courage (12 July 2000)

Military offices
Preceded by Pavel Kutakhov	Commander-in-Chief of the Soviet Air Force; 1984–1990	Succeeded by Yevgeny Shaposhnikov
