= Yakov Fedorenko =

Soviet marshal and commander

- Яков Николаевич Федоренко
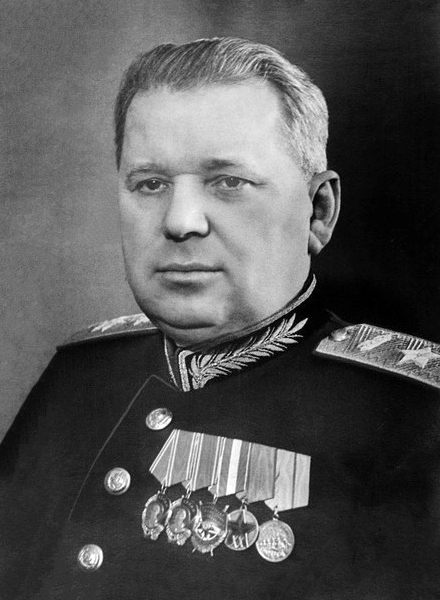
- Born: 22 October [O.S. 10 October] 1896; Tsareborisovo, Kharkov Governorate, Russian Empire (now Oskil, Kharkiv Oblast, Ukraine)
- Died: 26 March 1947 (aged 50); Moscow, Soviet Union
- Military career
- Allegiance: (Russian Empire) 1915 – 1917 (Soviet Union) 1918 – 1947
- Branch: Tank Troops
- Rank: Marshal of Armored Troops
- Unit: Main Armoured Directorate
- Conflicts: World War II
- Awards: Order of Lenin (4×); Order of the Red Banner (2×); Order of Suvorov; Order of Kutuzov

Yakov Nikolayevich Fedorenko (Russian: Яков Николаевич Федоренко; 22 October [O.S. 10 October] 1896 – 26 March 1947) was a Soviet marshal and commander during World War II.

== Life ==
Yakov Fedorenko was born to a working-class family in Tsareborisovo. He died in Moscow on 26 March 1947.

== Career ==
In 1915, during World War I, he was drafted into the Russian Navy. He also participated in October Revolution.

He joined the Red Army in 1918. In the 1920s, he completed the Higher Artillery Command School, and commanded multiple battalions and regiments.

On 4 June 1940, he became the Lieutenant-General of the Tank Troops. On 1 January 1940, he became a Colonel-General of the Tank Troops. On 21 February 1944, he became Marshal of the Tank Troops.

== Ranks ==
- Kombrig, 26 November 1935.
- Komdiv, 4 November 1939.
