= Filipp Agaltsov =

Soviet military commander (born 1900)

Filipp Aleksandrovich Agaltsov (Russian: Филипп Александрович Агальцов; 20 January 1900 – 29 June 1980) was a Soviet Air Force marshal of aviation and a Hero of the Soviet Union. Agaltsov commanded Long-Range Aviation between 1962 and 1969, his highest post.

== Early life and Russian Civil War ==
Filipp Aleksandrovich Agaltsov was born on 20 January 1900 in the village of Soldatskoye (now Yefremovsky District, Tula Oblast). Graduating from the village school in 1912, he worked as an assistant machinist at the Obukhov Factory in Petrograd.

Conscripted into the Red Army in July 1919 during the Russian Civil War, Agaltsov served as a machine gunner in the 1st Separate Communist Battalion from July 1919 to June 1920, fighting in the suppression of the revolt in Karelia. Between June and November 1920 he served as commander of a machine gun squad in the Polish–Soviet War.

== Interwar period ==
Until 1923, Agaltsov continued to serve in the infantry. in 1925 he graduated from the Kiev Military-Political School and until 1929 served in political positions in infantry units. In 1932 he graduated from the Military-Political Academy.

Agaltsov transferred to the Soviet Air Forces in April 1932, graduating from pilot courses at the Kacha Military Aviation School in 1934. He served as deputy commander for the political section in a squadron and aviation brigade in the Belorussian Military District. He took part in the Spanish Civil War from May 1937 to November 1938 as a political commissar of the Spanish Republican Air Force. Returning to the Soviet Union, he was appointed a member of the military council of the Red Army Air Force, and in August 1940 was appointed to his first command position, commanding a regiment in the Baltic Military District.

== World War II ==
After Operation Barbarossa began on 22 June 1941, Agaltsov continued to command the 50th Short-Range Bomber Aviation Regiment of the Northwestern Front in June and July. Between 1941 and 1933 he served as chief of the Tambov School of Junior Aviation Specialists. From March 1943 he returned to the front as commander the 292nd (from February 1944 the 9th Guards) Assault Aviation Division. He fought on the Voronezh, Steppe and 2nd Ukrainian Fronts. From November 1944, he commanded the 1st Mixed Aviation Corps of the Air Force of the Polish Army, part of the 1st Belorussian Front. During the war, Agaltsov flew several sorties on the Il-2 ground attack aircraft.

== Postwar ==
After the end of the war, Agaltsov served in command positions in the air force. From February 1947 to June 1949 he commanded the 16th (renumbered the 24th in February 1949) Air Army. Between 1949 and 1956 he was first deputy to the Commander-in-Chief of the Soviet Air Force. In 1956 he became a general-inspector of the air force, and from 1958 to 1962 served as deputy to the Commander-in-Chief of the Air Forces for combat training. Agaltsov rose to command Long-Range Aviation, the Soviet strategic bombing force, between April 1962 and January 1969, having been promoted to Marshal of Aviation in 1962. Agaltsov transferred to the Group of Inspectors General, a sinecure post for aging senior officers, in 1971. He lived in Moscow, where he died on 29 June 1980. Agaltsov was buried in the Novodevichy Cemetery.

== Awards ==
Agaltsov was a recipient of the following awards and decorations:

- Hero of the Soviet Union (21 February 1978)
- Order of Lenin (4)
- Order of the Red Banner (5)
- Order of Suvorov, 2nd class
- Order of Kutuzov, 2nd class
- Order of the Patriotic War, 1st class
- Order of the Red Star
- Order "For Service to the Homeland in the Armed Forces of the USSR" 3rd class
