= Marshal of the branch =

OF9 rank in the Soviet Union's armed forces

Marshal of the branch ма́ршал ро́да во́йск
- Small Marshal's Star

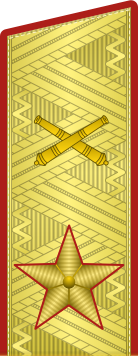
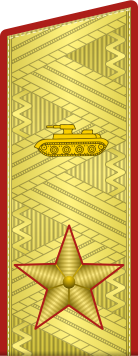
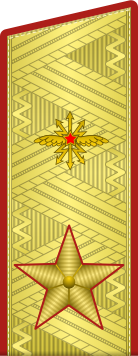
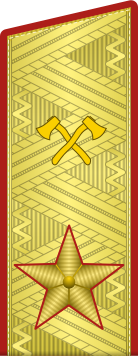
- Branch specific shoulder boards
- Country: Soviet Union
- Service branch: Soviet Army; Soviet Air Forces
- Rank group: General officer
- Rank: Marshal
- Formation: 1943
- Abolished: 1991
- Next higher rank: Chief marshal of the branch
- Next lower rank: Colonel general

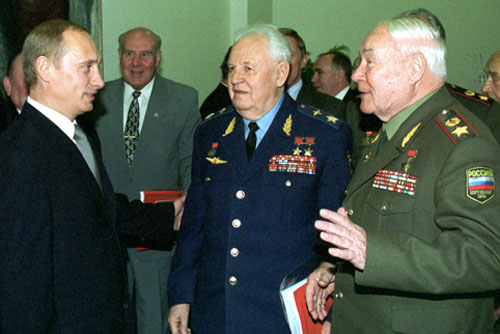
Marshal of Aviation Alexander Yefimov (1923–2012)

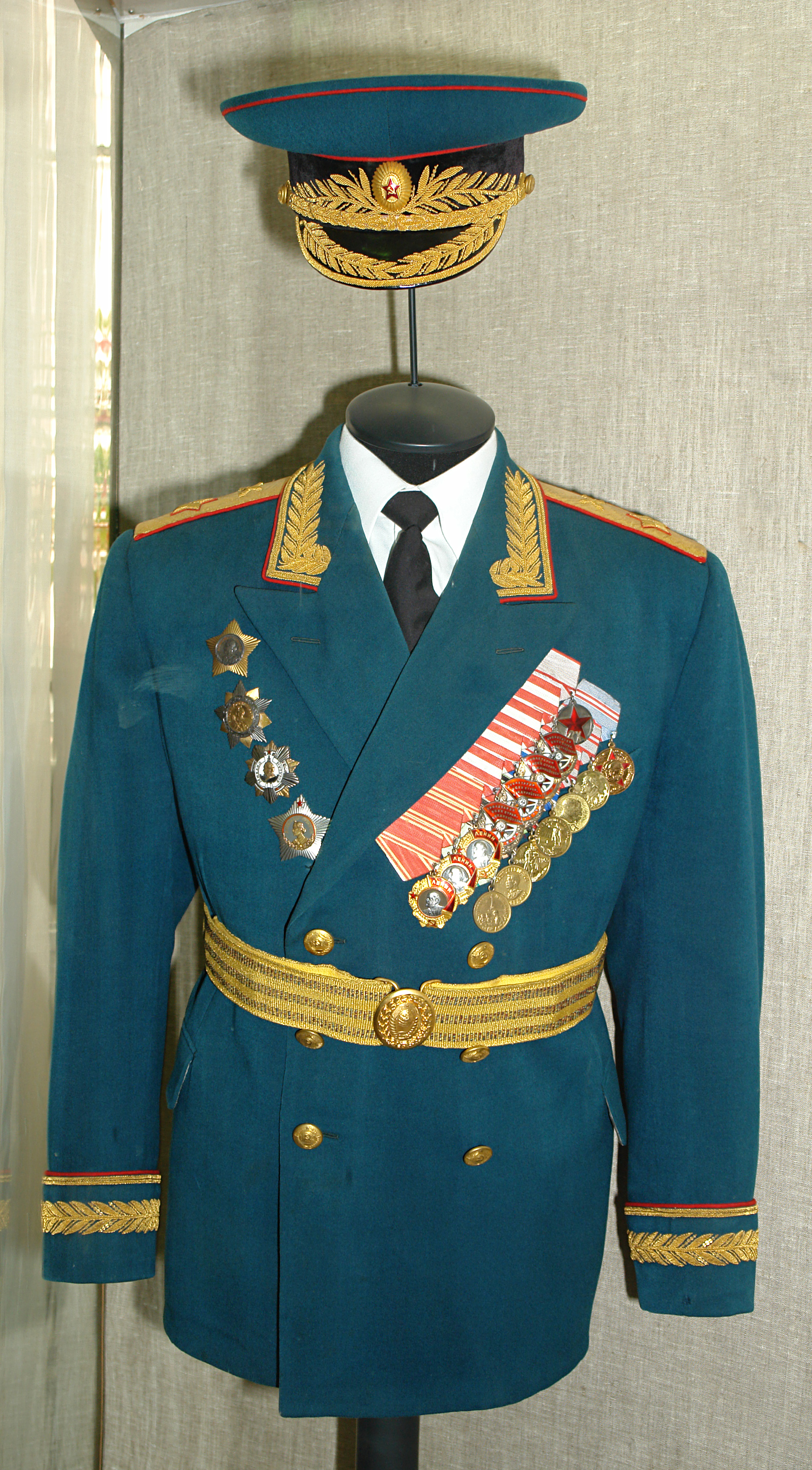
Uniform of marshal of the artillery Grigoriy Fedorovich Odinzov (1900–1972) Military historical museum, St. Petersburg

Marshal of the branch (or "marshal of the branch of service"; Russian: ма́ршал ро́да во́йск, romanized: marshal roda voysk) was from 1943 to 1974 the designation to a separate rank class in the general officer's rank group of the former Soviet Union's armed forces.

However, at that time, marshal of the branch was also the lowest marshal-rank of the Red Army, and later of the Soviet Army. Marshal of the branch was nominally the equivalent rank level to army general. However, general officers on that particular rank were not authorised, competent and mandated to be appointed to, or to act on the position of commander in chief of a big formation or command.

== Establishment ==
The term "marshal of the branch" was calqued from the German General der Waffengattung (general of the branch). The ranks of marshal of aviation, artillery and armoured troops branches were established on February 4, 1943, with a large, approximately 50mm wide, shoulder board star (the same star as the at-the-time equivalent rank of marshal of the Soviet Union's shoulder board star). When the rank of chief marshal was established on October 27, 1943, the size of the shoulder board's stars for marshals was made about 10mm smaller establishing the superiority of the marshal of the Soviet Union insignia. Also, on October 27, 1943, the ranks of marshal of the branches engineer troops and signals were established. On the uniform tie, marshals wore the marshal's star of the 2nd level.

In the branches, the rank of colonel general was followed by the next higher rank of marshal of the branch. While the rank of marshal of a branch was apparently equal to the one of general of the army (who was only entitled to the four small shoulder board stars), the marshals of branches had the marshal's star of the 2nd level on the tie and the large 40mm star on the shoulder boards, but the general of the army had neither. Generals of the army were given the 40mm star shoulder board and the marshal's star of the 2nd level on the tie in 1974.

Marshals of branches were normally eligible for promotion to chief marshal of branch, however, neither was eligible for promotion to marshal of the Soviet Union. After 1984, the rank of marshal was preserved only in the air force and artillery. Later, the rank of marshal stopped being conferred even in these branches. The regulations of Russian Army, confirmed in 1993, unified the system of general ranks in all the branches: the ranks of marshal of artillery and marshal of aviation were replaced by the one of general of the army (or army aviation), and the rank of chief marshal was cancelled.

== Rank insignia ==
The rank insignia of marshal of the branch was a large (~50mm-wide) five-pointed shoulder board star (at the time the same star was used on the shoulder boards of marshals of the Soviet Union). A marshal of the branch wore the second level five-pointed marshal's star on his uniform necktie.

When the rank of chief marshal of the branch was established, the size of the shoulder board stars for marshals was made about 10mm smaller, indicating the superiority of the marshal of the Soviet Union. The first level marshal's star was worn on the uniform tie of chief marshals of the branch and marshals of the Soviet Union.

In the branches, the rank of colonel general was succeeded by the rank of marshal of the branch, while the rank of marshal of a branch was apparently equal to the rank of general of the army (who was only entitled to the four small shoulder board stars). Marshals of branch, chief marshals of the branch and general of the army were at the OF9-level, generals of the army had neither marshals' stars on shoulder boards or uniform ties. However, in 1974, generals of the army were given the 40mm star shoulder board and the marshal's star of the second level on the tie.

=== Shoulder boards & epaulettes ===
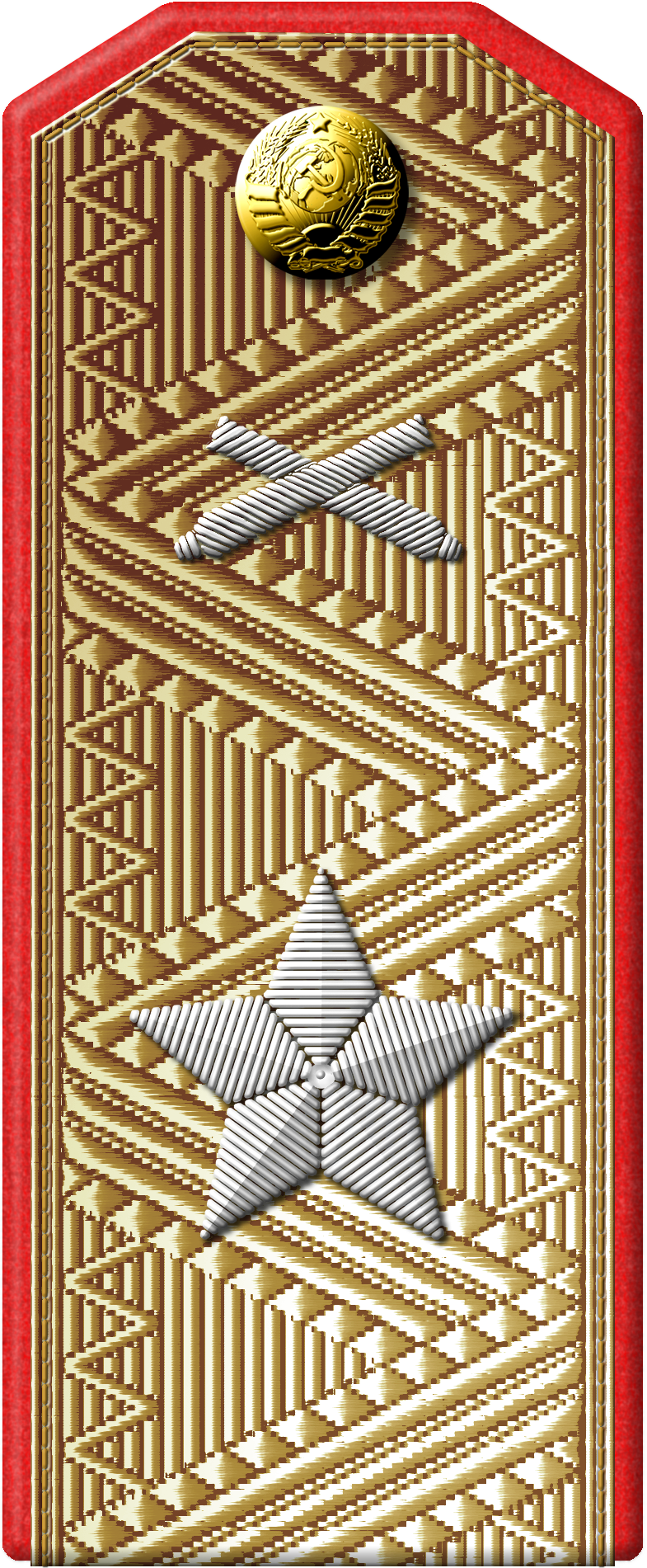
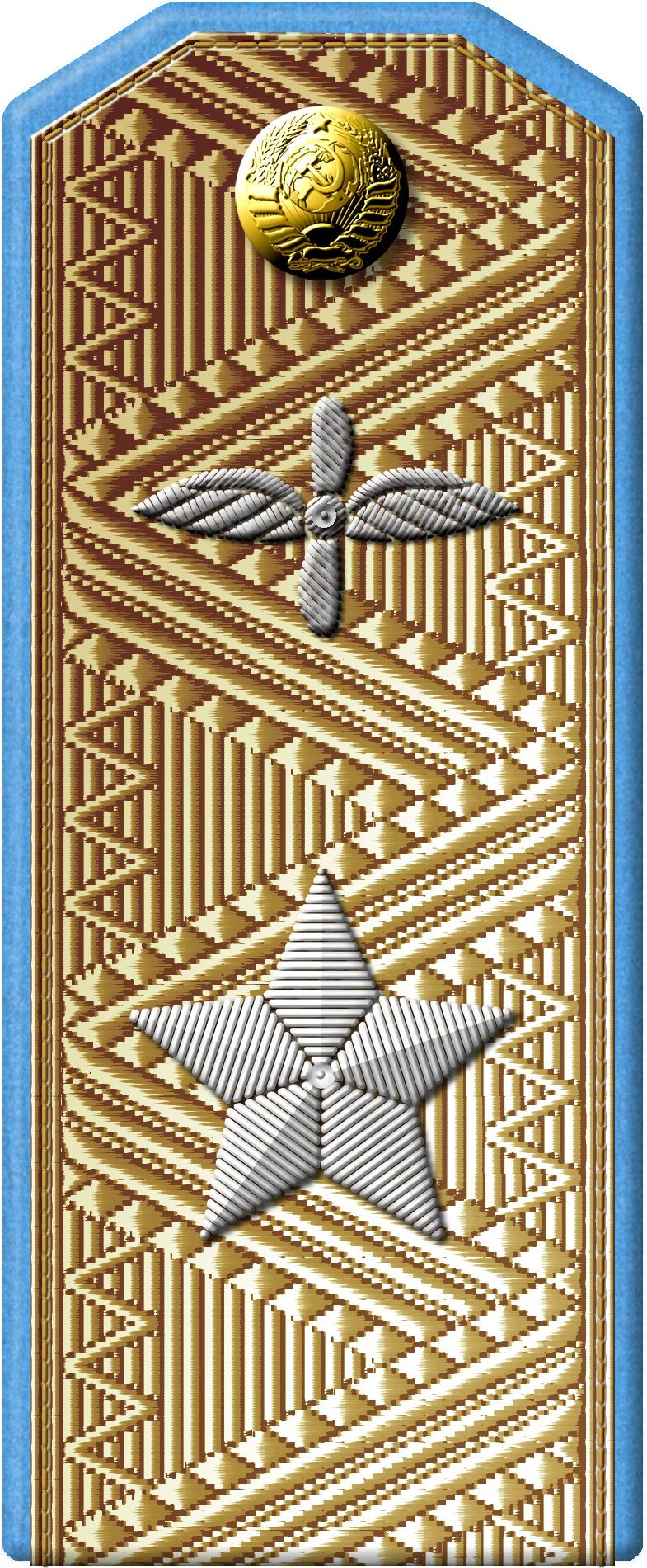
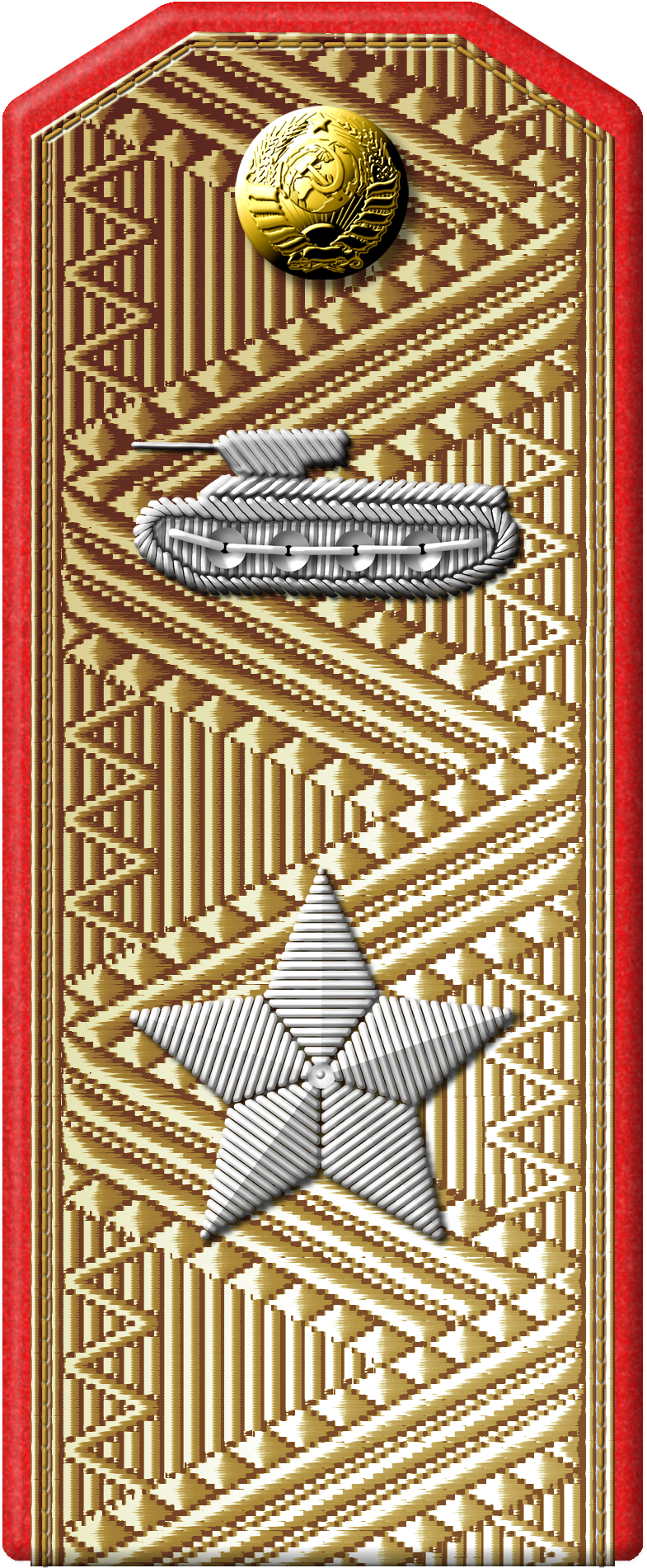
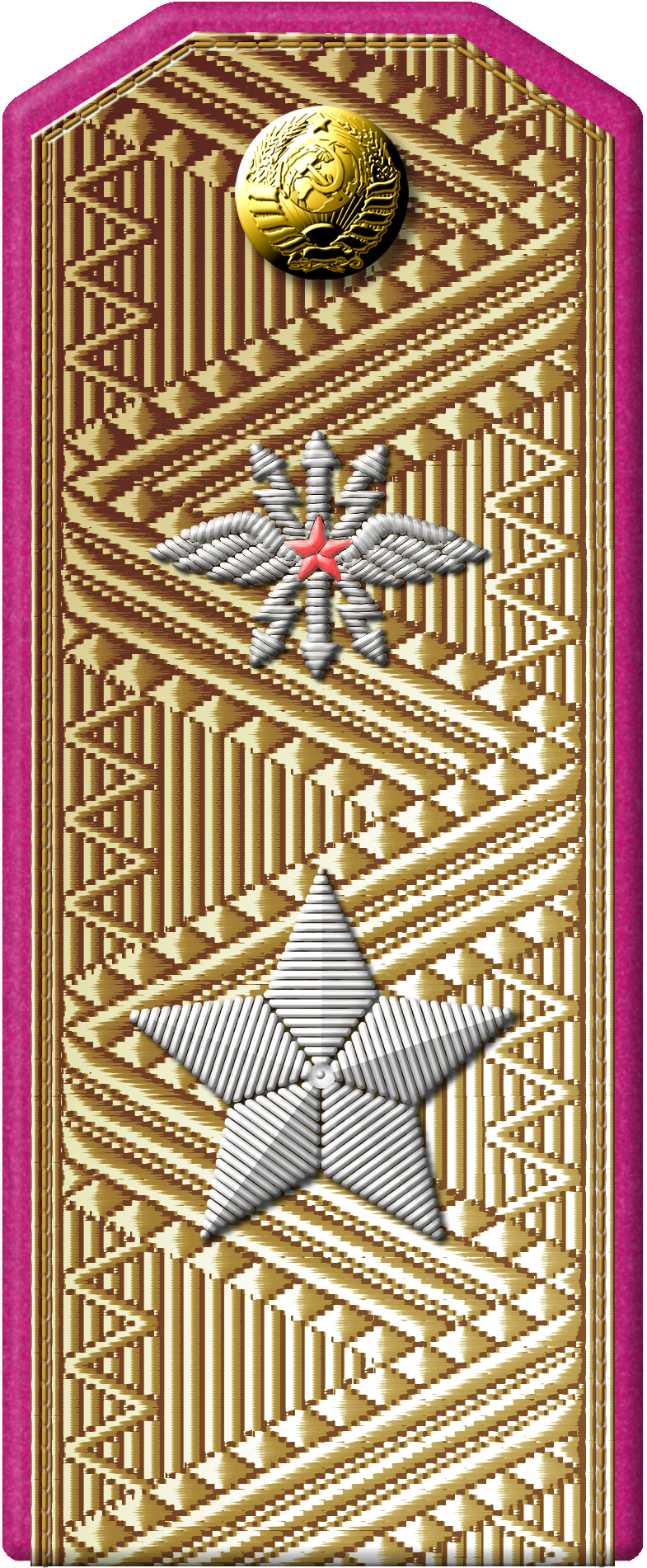
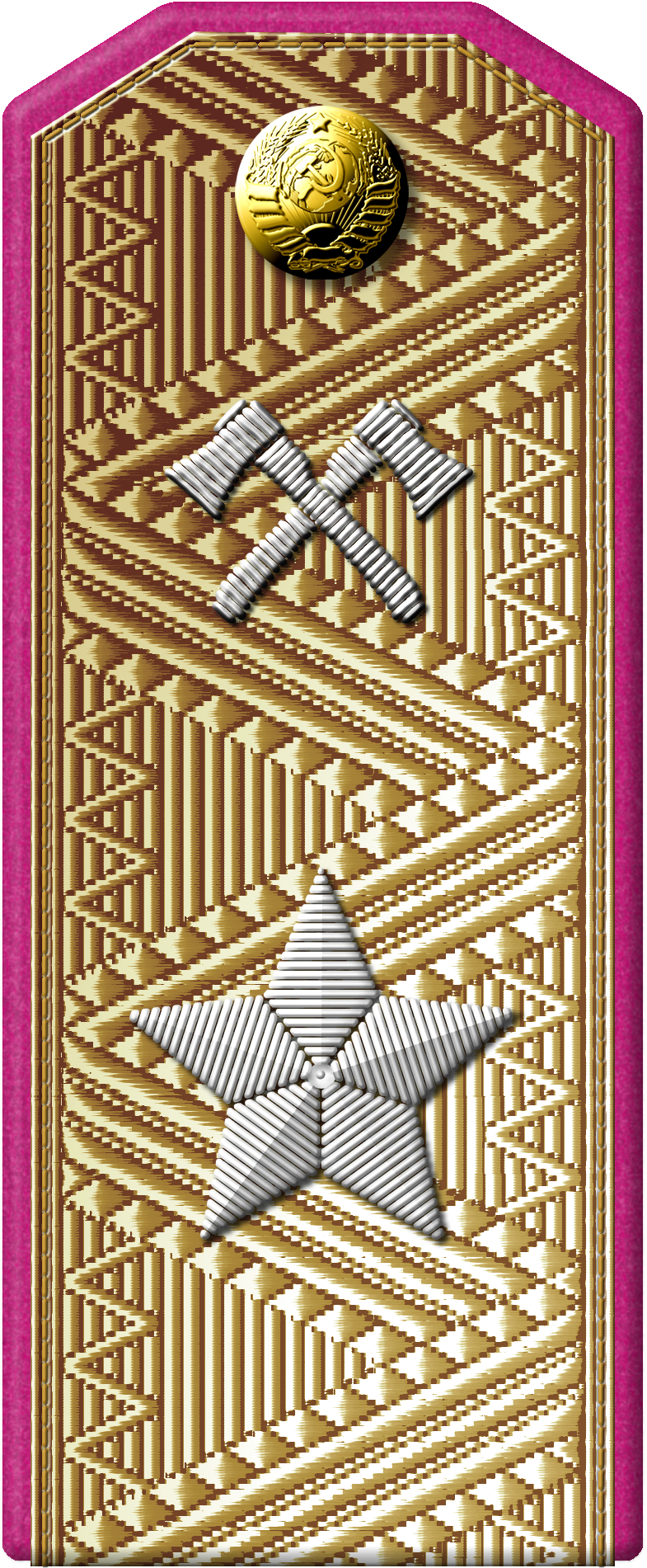
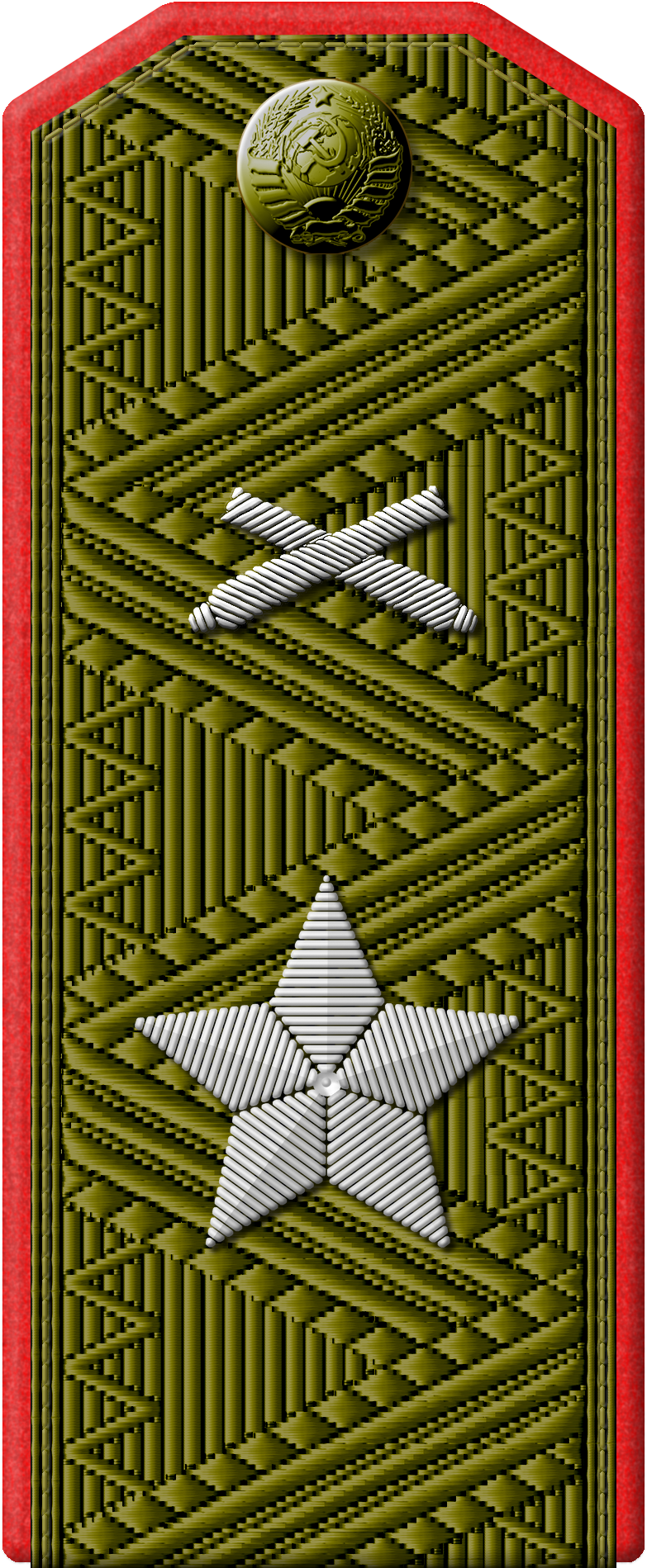
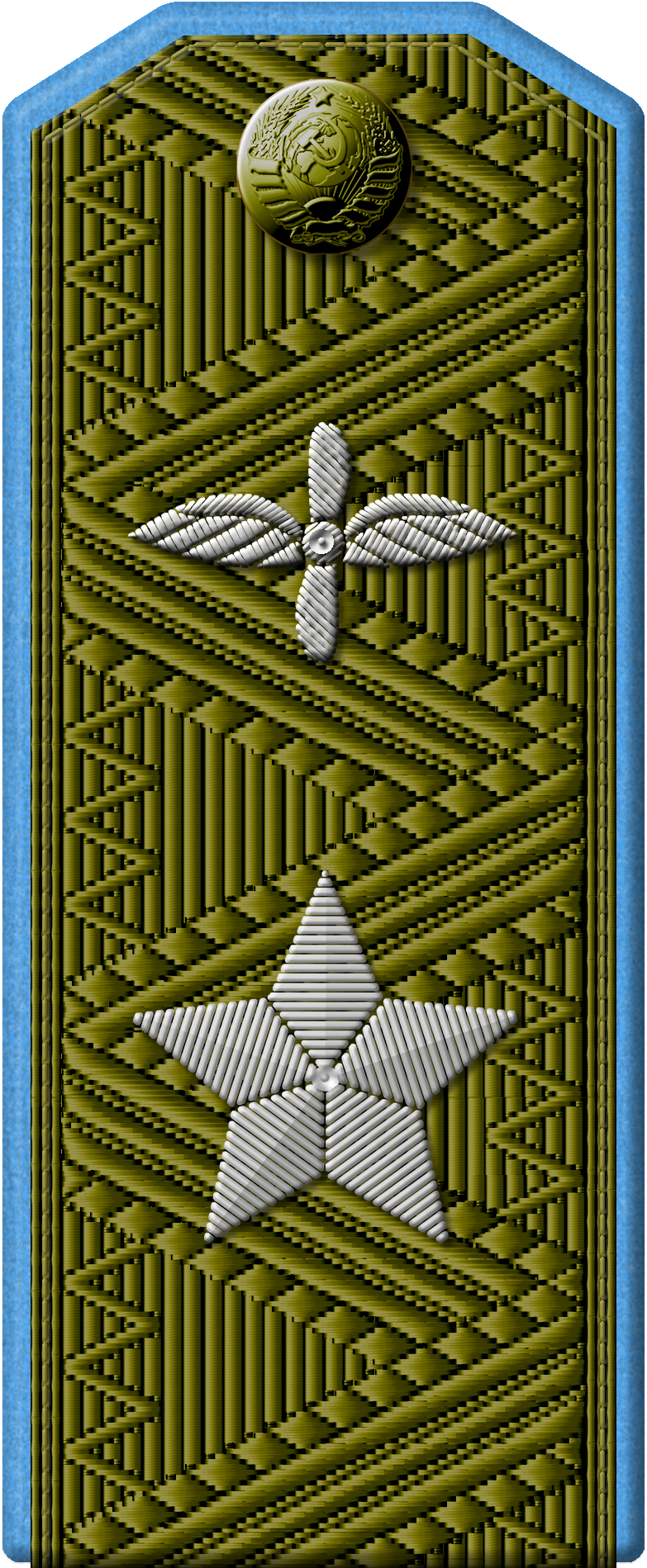
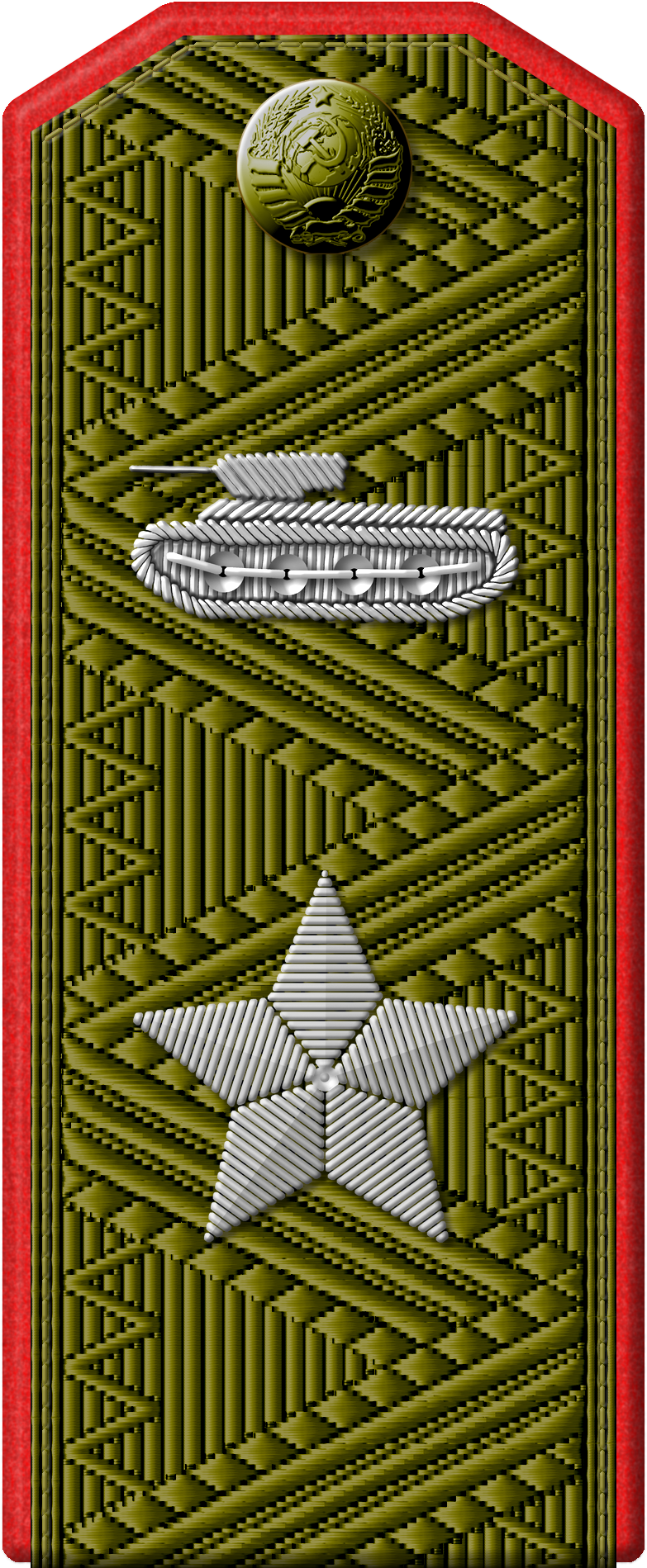
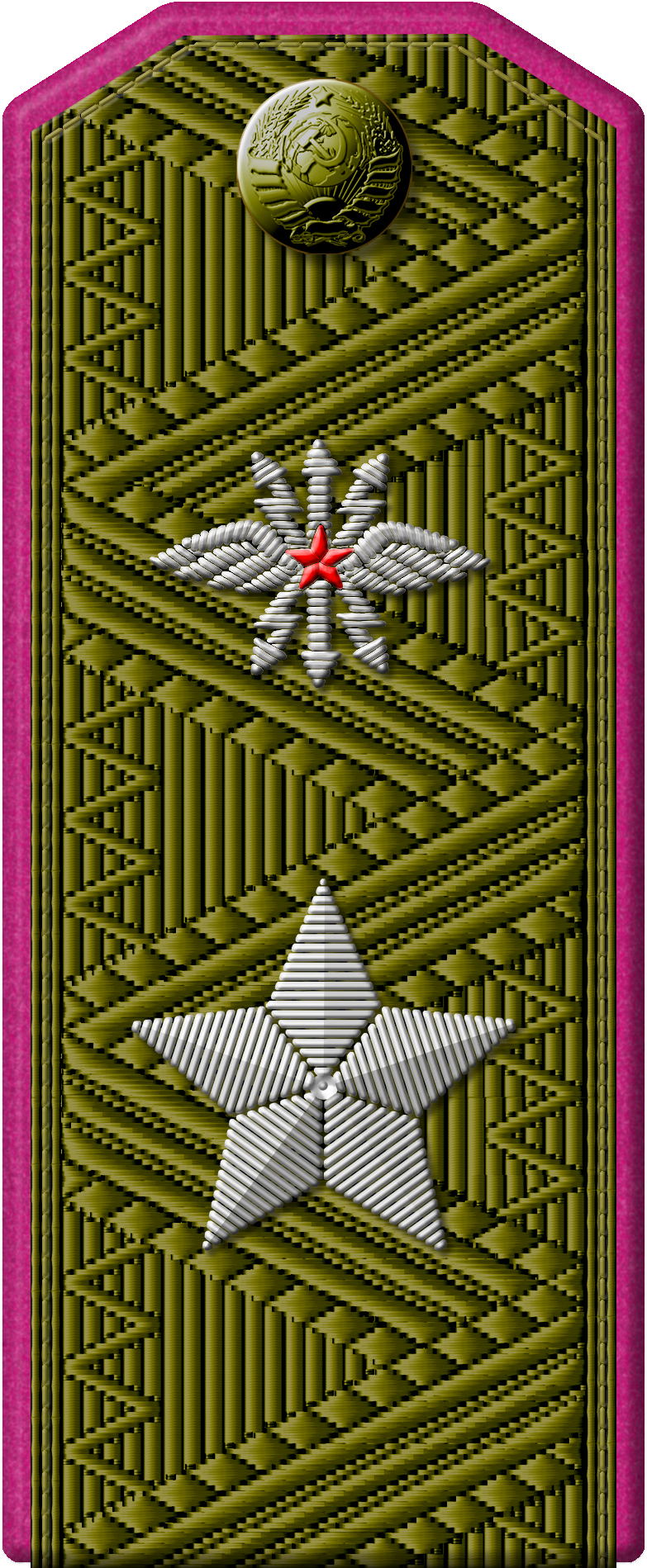
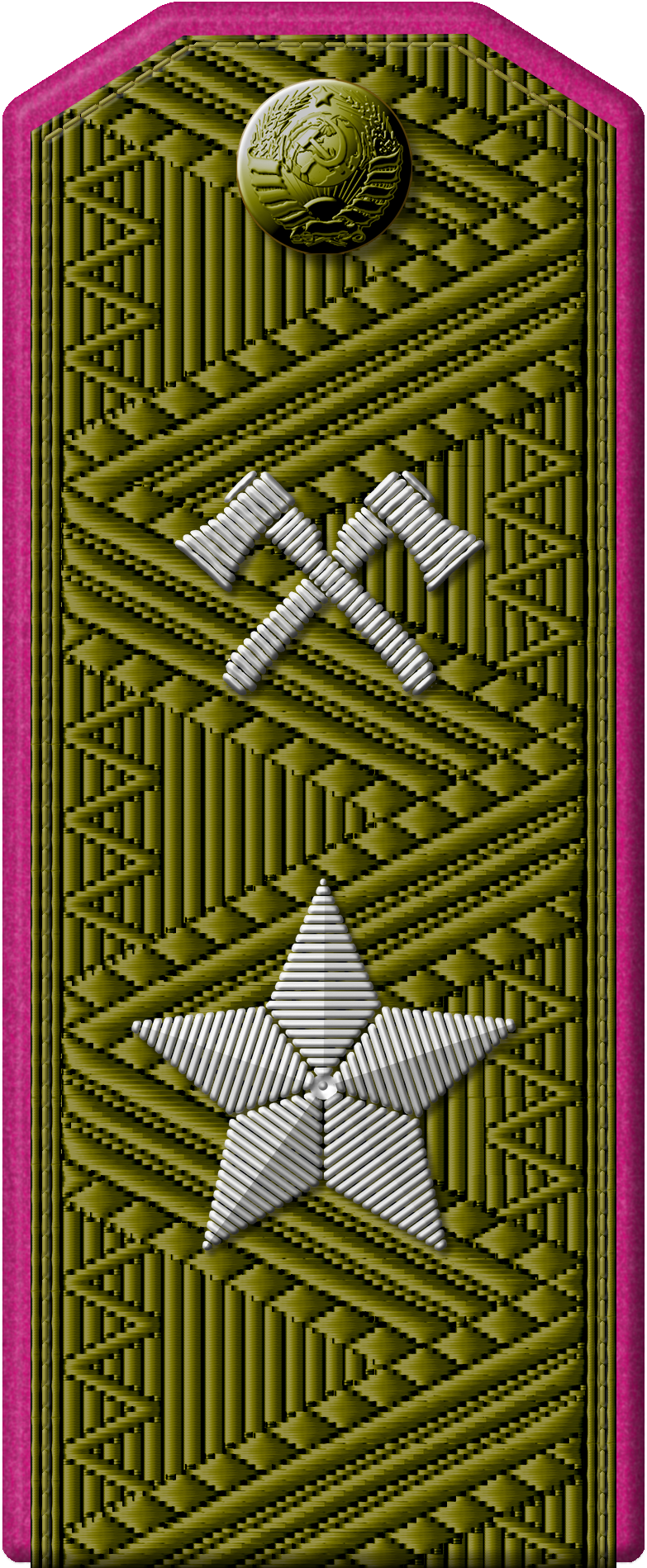
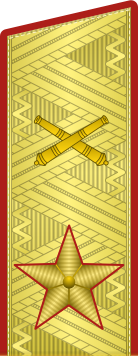
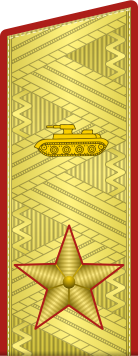
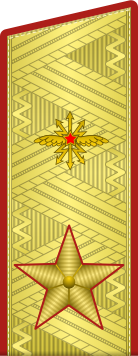
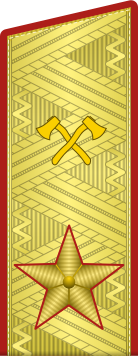
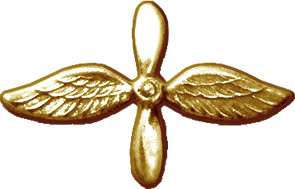
Designation	Marshal of the branch
... to dress uniform	Shoulder boards 1943–1955
... to service / field uniform
... to dress uniform	Shoulder boards 1955–1974
Russian designation	Маршал артиллерии	Маршал авиации	Маршал бронетанковых войск	Маршал войск связи	Маршал инженерных войск
English designation	Marshal of the artillery	Marshal of the aviation	Marshal of the armored troops	Marshal of the signal troops	Marshal of the engineer troops
Emblem
NATO-equivalent	OF-9

== List of marshals of the branch ==
=== Marshals of the artillery ===
1. Nikolai Nikolaevich Voronov; appointed 18 January 1943 (chief marshal 1944)
2. Nikolai Dmitrievich Yakovlev; appointed 21 February 1944, rank removed 1952–1953
3. Mikhail Nikolaevich Chistiakov; appointed 25 September 1944
4. Mitrofan Ivanovich Nedelin; appointed 4 August 1953 (chief marshal 1955)
5. Sergey Sergeyevich Varentsov; appointed 11 March 1955 (chief marshal 1961), degraded to major general 1963
6. Vasili Ivanovich Kazakov; appointed 11 March 1955
7. Konstantin Petrovich Kazakov; appointed 28 April 1962
8. Yuri Pavlovich Bazhanov; appointed 18 June 1965
9. Pavel Nikolaevich Kuleshov; appointed 28 October 1967
10. Georgy Fedotovich Odintsov; appointed 22 February 1968
11. Georgy Yefimovich Peredelsky; appointed 5 November 1973
12. Yefim Vasilyevich Boychuk; appointed 4 November 1980
13. Vladimir Mikhailovich Mikhalkin; appointed 15 February 1989

=== Marshals of aviation ===
1. Alexander Alexandrovich Novikov; appointed 17 March 1943 (chief marshal 1944)
2. Alexander Yevgenievich Golovanov; appointed 3 August 1943 (chief marshal 1944)
3. Fedor Alexeevich Astakhov; appointed 19 August 1944
4. Fedor Yakovlevich Falaleev; appointed 19 August 1944
5. Sergei Alexandrovich Khudyakov; appointed 19 August 1944
6. Nikolai Semyonovich Skripko; appointed 19 August 1944
7. Grigory Alexeevich Vorozheikin; appointed 19 August 1944
8. Semyon Fedorovich Zhavoronkov; appointed 25 September 1944
9. Konstantin Andreevich Vershinin; appointed 3 June 1946 (chief marshal 1959)
10. Pavel Fedorovich Zhigarev; appointed 3 August 1953 (chief marshal 1955)
11. Sergei Ignatevich Rudenko; appointed 11 March 1955
12. Vladimir Alexandrovich Sudets; appointed 11 March 1955
13. Stepan Akimovich Krasovsky; appointed 8 May 1959
14. Yevgeny Yakovlevich Savitsky; appointed 6 May 1961
15. Filipp Alexandrovich Agaltsov; appointed 28 April 1962
16. Yevgeny Fyodorovich Loginov; appointed 28 October 1967
17. Pavel Stepanovich Kutakhov; appointed 1969 (chief marshal 1972)
18. Ivan Ivanovuch Borzov; appointed 16 December 1972
19. Alexander Pokryshkin; appointed 16 December 1972
20. Boris Pavlovich Bugayev; appointed 5 November 1973 (chief marshal 1977)
21. Georgy Vasilyevich Zimin; appointed 5 November 1973
22. Alexander Nikolayevich Yefimov; appointed 29 April 1975
23. Ivan Ivanovich Pstygo; appointed 29 April 1975
24. Alexander Petrovich Silantyev; appointed 19 February 1976
25. Alexander Ivanovich Koldunov; appointed 28 October 1977 (chief marshal 1984)
26. Grigory Petrovich Skorikov; appointed 4 November 1980
27. Nikolay Mikhailovich Skomorokhov; appointed 2 November 1981
28. Pyotr Semyonovich Kirsanov; appointed 16 December 1982
29. Anatoly Ustinovich Konstantinov; appointed 30 April 1985
30. Ivan Nikitovich Kozhedub; appointed 6 May 1985
31. Alexander Nikitovich Volkov; appointed 15 February 1989
32. Yevgeny Ivanovich Shaposhnikov; appointed 26 August 1991

=== Marshals of the armored troops ===
1. Pavel Alekseyevich Rotmistrov; appointed 21 February 1944 (chief marshal 1962)
2. Yakov Nikolaevich Fedorenko; appointed 21 February 1944
3. Semyon Iliych Bogdanov; appointed 1 June 1945
4. Pavel Semenovich Rybalko; appointed 1 June 1945
5. Mikhail Yefimovich Katukov; appointed 26 October 1959
6. Pavel Pavlovich Poluboyakov; appointed 28 April 1962
7. Hamazasp Khachaturovich Babadzhanian; appointed 28 October 1967 (chief marshal 1975)
8. Oleg Aleksandrovich Losik; appointed 29 April 1975

=== Marshals of the signal troops ===
1. Ivan Terentevich Peresypkin; appointed 21 February 1944
2. Aleksey Ivanovich Leonov; appointed 6 May 1961
3. Andrey Ivanovich Belov; appointed 5 November 1973
4. Nikolai Nikolaevich Alekseev; appointed 25 October 1979

=== Marshals of engineer troops ===
1. Mikhail Petrovich Vorobyev; appointed 21 February 1944
2. Aleksey Ivanovich Proshlyakov; appointed 6 May 1961
3. Viktor Kondradevich Charshenko; appointed 16 December 1972
4. Archil Viktorovich Gelovani; appointed 28 October 1977
5. Sergey Christoforovich Aganov; appointed 5 May 1980
6. Nikolay Fyodorovich Sherstopalov; appointed 6 May 1981

== See also ==
- Marshal of the Soviet Union
- Chief marshal of the branch
- Ranks and insignia of the Soviet Armed Forces 1943–1955, and 1955–1991
