= Vladimir Sudets =

Soviet military officer

Vladimir Alexandrovich Sudets
- Владимир Александрович Судец
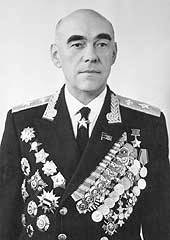
- Born: 23 October 1904; Ekaterinoslav Governorate, Russian Empire
- Died: 6 May 1981 (aged 76); Moscow, Soviet Union
- Military career
- Allegiance: Soviet Union
- Service years: 1925–1981
- Rank: Marshal of the aviation
- Units: 17th Air Army; Long Range Aviation
- Conflicts: Soviet–Japanese Border Wars; World War II; Winter War; Eastern Front; Battle of Kursk; Dnieper–Carpathian Offensive

Vladimir Alexandrovich Sudets (Russian: Владимир Александрович Судец; 23 October 1904 – 6 May 1981) was a Soviet air commander during World War II, commanding the 17th Air Army, and later became Marshal of the aviation after the war.

== Early life and military career ==
Vladimir was born into a working-class family in the village of Nizhnedneprovsk, formerly part of Ekaterinoslav Governorate, but is now part of the city Dnipro in Ukraine. In 1921 he graduated from the Oleksandriv'sk Mechanical and Technical School (now - Zaporizhzhia Polytechnic National University). In 1924, he joined the Communist Party of the Soviet Union, and the following year in September joined the Red Army. In 1927 he graduated from an air force technical school, and from a pilot school in 1929. He served in Kiev Military District afterwards. From 1933 to 1937, he served in Mongolia and took part in the Soviet–Japanese border conflicts. He participated in the Winter War from February to March 1940 as the deputy commander of the 27th Heavy Bomber Air Brigade. In November he took command of the 4th Long Range Air Corps, and was commanding it when Germany invaded the Soviet Union in June 1941.

In October 1941, he became the commander of the Volga Military District's Air Force, which he commanded till June 1942. From September 1942 to March 1943, he commanded the 1st Bomber Air Corps. In March 1943, he took command of the 17th Air Army, which he commanded till the end of World War II. The 17th Air Army took part in the Battle of Kursk, the Dnieper–Carpathian, Jassy–Kishinev, and Prague Offensives. On 28 April 1945, he was awarded Hero of the Soviet Union, the Order of Lenin and the Gold Star. From 1946 to 1949, he served as both the Chief of Staff and Deputy Commander-in-Chief of the Soviet Air Force. On 11 March 1955, he became Marshal of Aviation. From 1955 to 1962 he was Commanding General of Long-Range Aviation, and from 1962 to 1966, he was Commander-in-Chief of the Air Defense of the Country and a Deputy Minister of Defense.

He died in Moscow on 6 May 1981 and was buried at the Novodevichy Cemetery.

== Awards ==
Throughout his military career, he was awarded four Orders of Lenin, an Order of October Revolution, five Orders of the Red Banner, an Order of Suvorov First Class, an Order of Suvorov Second Class, an Order of Kutuzov First Class, an Order of Kutuzov Second Class, and an Order of the Red Star. His foreign awards included: People's Hero of Yugoslavia (October 1964), Hero of the Mongolian People's Republic (7 May 1971), the Order of the British Empire Knight Commander, the Partisan Star First Class, and the Order of Sukhbaatar.
