= Nikolai Dmitriyevich Yakovlev =

Nikolai Dmitriyevich Yakovlev (1898–1972) was a Soviet Marshal of the artillery. During the 1937 - 1941 period, he was artillery chief of the Belorussian, North Caucasus and Kiev Military Districts. From 1941 to 1948, he was head of the Main Artillery Directorate (GAU) (In Russian: GAU = Glavnye Artilleryiskye Upravlenue) and member of the Military Council of the Red Army's artillery force. In this position, he carried out a great amount of work to provide the combat army with arms and munitions. New types of artillery weapons and munitions were developed and introduced in the army under his guidance. He was later imprisoned from 1952 to 1953, and retired in 1960.
