= Nikolai Skripko =

Soviet Marshal of the aviation Nikolai Semenovich Skripko (1902–1987)

At the beginning of the German-Soviet War (1941–1945), commander of the 3rd long-range bombers' corps, then commander of the Air Force of the 5th Army and deputy commander of the Air Force of the Southwestern Front (Soviet Union). From March 1942, he was deputy commander of the Long-Range Aviation, and from December 1944 - first deputy commander of the 18th Air Army. Took part in organising combat use of long-range aviation units near Leningrad and Stalingrad, in the North Caucasus, in the Battle of Kursk, in the Crimea and during the liberation of Belarus, the Baltic countries and Eastern Prussia.

He was awarded many orders and medals.

In 1995 the 610th Centre for the Combat Employment and Retraining of Personnel of the Military-Transport Aviation was named in his honor.
