= Sergey Aganov =

Soviet Marshal of engineer troops

Sergey Hristoforovich Aganov
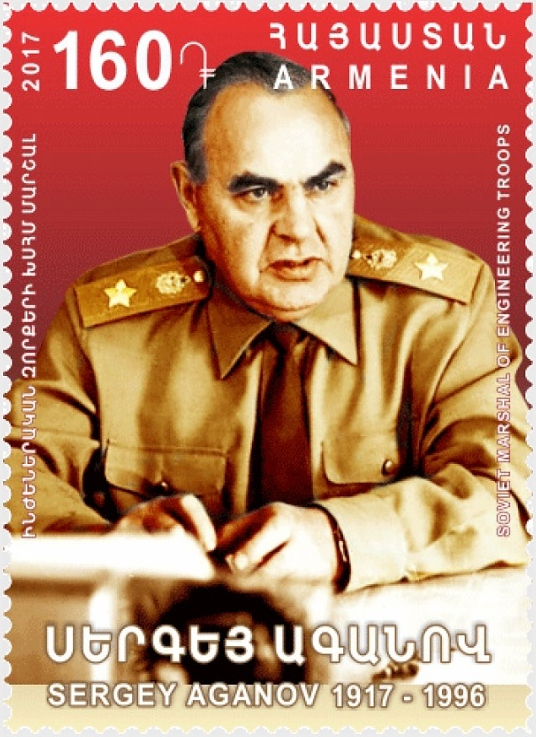
- Aganov on a 2017 stamp of Armenia
- Native name: Armenian: Սերգեյ Աղանով
- Born: 4 June 1917; Astrakhan, Russian Empire
- Died: 1 February 1996 (aged 78) Moscow, Russia
- Allegiance: Soviet Union
- Rank: Marshal of Engineer Troops
- Conflicts: World War II; Winter War; Eastern Front

Sergey Hristoforovich Aganov (Russian: Серге́й Христофо́рович Ага́нов; 4 June 1917 – 1 February 1996) was a Soviet military officer in the engineer troops of the Soviet Armed Forces. He participated in the Winter War and the Eastern Front of World War II. He continued his service in the post-war period and rose to the rank of Marshal of the Engineer Troops.

== Youth ==
Aganov was born on 4 June 1917, named as Sargis Kristapori Ohanian (Arm. Սարգիս Քրիստափորի Օհանյան). It is usually indicated that Aganov is Russian by nationality, but after the declaration of independence of Armenia, in Armenian literature, it is often stated that he is an Armenian, with the surname Ohanian. His grandfather moved to from Nagorno-Karabakh to Astrakhan. After high school, Aganov worked at the Moscow Electric Plant, and was the foreman of the assembly team. In one of his letters, talking about himself, Aganov wrote that his father was an Armenian from Astrakhan, and his mother was a Russian. His parents separated when he was young. According to his information, his father died in 1965 in Grozny. Aganov began to serve in the Red Army since 1938. He graduated from the Moscow Military Engineering School in 1940. He took part in the battle of the Soviet-Finnish war as a sapper platoon commander. From March 1940, Aganov commanded a sapper company, then later became the head of the school for junior commanders of the sapper brigade of the Leningrad Military District.

== Great Patriotic War ==
He participated in the Great Patriotic War from June 1941. He commanded a sapper company, from October 1941 as a senior adjutant (according to modern terminology, corresponds to the position of chief of staff) of a sapper battalion, then from February 1942 as a deputy commander of a motor-engineer battalion, then from April 1942 as an assistant chief of staff of engineering troops of the 54th Army. He fought on the Leningrad and Volkhov fronts.

In November 1942, he was recalled from the front for further service at the headquarters of the engineering troops of the Red Army. He served as assistant, then senior assistant to the head of the operations department. As part of a group of representatives of the Headquarters of the Supreme High Command, he repeatedly went to the army. Aganov assisted troops in organizing engineering support for operations on the Southwestern, Bryansk, Voronezh, 3rd Belorussian, 1st Baltic and 2nd Baltic fronts. Aganov was a Member of the CPSU since 1942.

== Post-war years ==
After the war, Aganov continued to serve in the headquarters of the engineering troops of the Soviet Army, and was a senior officer in the department. In 1950, he graduated from the M. V. Frunze Military Academy. Since 1951, Aganov was deputy head of the department, and since January 1952, he was head of the department of the headquarters of the engineering troops of the Soviet Army. In 1955, he graduated from the Higher Military Academy named after K. E. Voroshilov.

From November 1955, Aganov served as the head of the engineering troops of the 8th Guards Army in the Group of Soviet Forces in Germany, before he was transferred to teaching work. In August 1960, he was appointed senior teacher, and in December 1963, as deputy head of the department of the Military Academy of the General Staff. From January 1967, he was Chief of Engineering Troops of the Group of Soviet Forces in Germany. Since January 1970, Aganov served as Deputy Chief of Engineering Troops of the Ministry of Defence. From April 1974, he was Head of the Military Engineering Academy named after V. Kuibyshev.

Since March 1975, Aganov served as Head of the Engineering Troops of the USSR Ministry of Defense. He paid great attention to improving the organizational structure of the engineering troops and their technical equipment, developing effective methods of engineering support for combat operations of the troops, and training engineering personnel. He made a great contribution to the organization and implementation of measures to eliminate the consequences of the accident at the Chernobyl nuclear power plant. Since April 1975, Aganov served as Colonel General of the Engineering Troops, then finally reached military rank of Marshal of Engineering Troops, awarded on 7 May 1980. Since March 1987, Aganov was in the Group of General Inspectors of the USSR Ministry of Defense.

Aganov retired in 1992, and resided in Moscow until his death. He was buried at the Troyekurovskoye Cemetery.

On 12 December 2017, a postage stamp was issued in Armenia dedicated as "100th anniversary of the birth of Marshal of the Engineering Troops of the USSR Sergey Aganov".

== Awards ==
- Order of Lenin (24.12.1986)
- Order of the Red Banner (02/19/1986)
- Order of Kutuzov 1st degree (11/04/1981);
- Order of the Patriotic War 1st degree (04/06/1985);
- Order of the Patriotic War 2nd degree (05/17/1944);
- Two Orders of the Red Star (11/03/1953, 10/31/1967);
- Order "For Service to the Homeland in the Armed Forces of the USSR" 3rd degree
- Medal "For Courage" (04/21/1942)
- Medal "For Military Merit" (06/20/1949)
- Medal "For the Defence of Leningrad"
- Medal "For Strengthening of Brotherhood in Arms"
- USSR State Prize (1981)
- Several commemoration awards
- Several foreign awards
