= Pavel Kutakhov =

Flying ace during World War II

Pavel Stepanovich Kutakhov
- Павел Степанович Кутахов
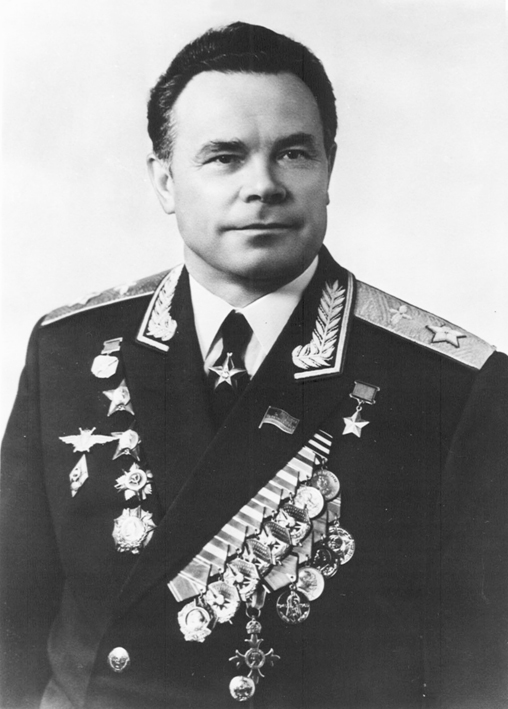
- Born: 16 August [O.S. 3 August] 1914; Malokirsanovka, Don Host Oblast, Russian Empire
- Died: 3 December 1984 (aged 70); Moscow, Russian SFSR, Soviet Union
- Burial place: Novodevichy Cemetery, Moscow
- Military career
- Allegiance: Soviet Union
- Branch: Soviet Air Force
- Service years: 1935–1984
- Rank: Chief Marshal of Aviation
- Commands: Soviet Air Force
- Conflicts: World War II; Invasion of Poland; Winter War; Eastern Front
- Awards: Hero of the Soviet Union (twice); Lenin Prize

Signature
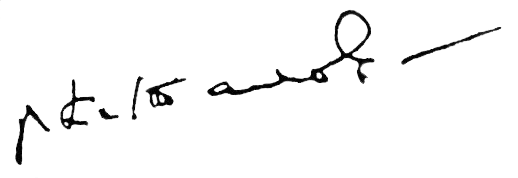

Pavel Stepanovich Kutakhov CBE (Russian: Павел Степанович Кутахов; 16 August [O.S. 3 August] 1914 – 3 December 1984) was a flying ace during World War II who went on to become Commander-in-Chief of the Soviet Air Forces between 1969 and 1984. During his career he held a variety of commands and visited several countries receiving Soviet military aid.

== Early life ==
Kutakhov was born on 16 August [O.S. 3 August] 1914 to a Russian family in Malokirsanovka village. His father died in 1918, but with the support of his older brothers he began to attend school. After completing his seventh grade of school in Taganrog in 1930 he trained to become a tram driver, but soon after completing training in 1933 he developed an interest aviation, so until 1934 he worked as a mechanic at an aircraft factory. Shortly before entering the military in mid 1935 he graduated from the Taganrog Industrial Institute. One year after graduating from the Stalingrad Military Aviation School in November 1938 he entered combat in the Winter War, having earlier been assigned to the 7th Fighter Aviation Regiment as a flight commander. On 24 December 1939 he was shot down by friendly fire from Aleksey Storozhakov, who mistook his Polikarpov fighter for a Finnish plane. However, he managed to bring his crippled I-15b over Soviet territory to make a forced landing. While the plane was damaged beyond repair, Kutakhov was soon able to return to flying with his unit, tallying 131 sorties by the end of the war and rising to the position of deputy squadron commander. He then trained to fly the I-153 fighter and later the MiG-3 until the German invasion of the Soviet Union in June 1941.

== World War II ==
Upon the German invasion of the Soviet Union in June 1941, Kutakhov was deployed to the warfront with his unit as a deputy squadron commander, but by July he was reassigned to the 145th Fighter Aviation Regiment (later renamed as the 19th Guards Fighter Aviation Regiment in April 1942). Later that month he gained his first aerial victory, having shot down an Fieseler Fi 156 Storch. He did not gain any further aerial victories until 1942, having switched to flying the Lavochkin-Gorbunov-Gudkov LaGG-3, although all aerial victories he gained while flying that plane were shared. In mid 1942 he began flying the Bell P-39 Airacobra, which he gathered the remainder of his shootdowns on. By the time he was nominated for the title Hero of the Soviet Union on 17 February 1943 he had been promoted to the position of squadron commander and totaled 262 combat sorties. Later that year he saw several very intense aerial combats; as a result he was shot down on 27 March, but he survived due to his parachute, and then on 21 June he allegedly shot down the Messerschmitt Bf 109 piloted by Heinrich Ehrler, forcing him to escape by parachute and be evacuated by a rescue plan, although the incident is not mentioned in German or Western sources. In May 1944 Kutakhov was promoted to commander of the 20th Guards Fighter Aviation Regiment, after which he flew in combat much less due to his seniority, but nevertheless he gained one last aerial victory in December that year (a Bf 109). By the end of the war he accumulated 327 sorties, participated in 63 dogfights, and was credited with at least 12 solo aerial victories, (Note: There are several variations of Kutakhov's final tally of victories; reliable sources indicate possible tallies as 13 solo plus 24 shared, 12 solo plus 16 shared, and 13 solo plus 15 shared) seeing combat in the battles for Leningrad, Karelia, Murmansk, the Arctic, Svir-Petrozavodsk, and Petsamo-Kirkenes.

== Postwar ==
After remaining in command of his regiment until November 1948, he went on to attend the Lipetsk Higher Officer Tactical Flight Courses of the Air Force, which he graduated from in 1949 before being assigned as deputy commander of the 175th Fighter Aviation Division; the unit was based in East Germany, where he held a variety of postings until 1955. In December 1950 he was promoted to commander of the 145th Fighter Aviation Division, which he remained in command of until transferring to the post of deputy commander of the 71st Fighter Aviation Corps; later he became its commander in December 1953, and in 1954 he was promoted to the rank of general-major. Two years later he left the unit to attend the Higher Military Academy, which he graduated from in 1957. From then until October 1959 he served as deputy commander of combat training in the 30th Air Army, after which he became the 1st Deputy Commander. From August 1961 to July 1967 he commanded the 48th Air Army, and from then to March 1969 he served as the 1st Deputy Commander-in-Chief of the Air Force. In that post he was tasked with overseeing the development process of new flight technology. In February 1969 he was promoted to the rank of Marshal of Aviation, and the next month he became the commander of the Soviet Air Force. In that position, which he remained for the rest of his life, much of his time modernizing and re-equipping the Soviet Air Force with newer aircraft, and he strongly supported the creation of long-range radar systems. In 1982 he visited Syria with his colleague Koldunov to assess the damage caused by the Israeli attack that took out many Soviet-made aircraft, Operation Mole Cricket 19, in addition to visiting Egypt on several occasions, including to evaluate the damage inflicted on Egyptian Aviation by the Israeli Air Force during the later phase of the War of Attrition. For his role in revamping the air force he was awarded the title Hero of the Soviet Union a second time on 15 August 1984, on his 70th birthday. However, he died of a severe stroke on 3 December 1984 before he received his second gold star medal and was buried in the Novodevichy cemetery. The medal was presented to his widow Valentina in January 1985. Throughout his career he totaled 2300 flight hours, flying various jets including the Mikoyan-Gurevich MiG-15, Mikoyan-Gurevich MiG-17, Mikoyan-Gurevich MiG-21, and Sukhoi Su-7; he did not give up flying until the age of 60.

== Awards and honors ==
Soviet

- Twice Hero of the Soviet Union (1 May 1943 and 15 August 1984)
- Four Order of Lenin (1 May 1943, 15 August 1974, 21 February 1978, and 15 August 1984)
- Order of the October Revolution (4 May 1972)
- Five Order of the Red Banner (1 May 1942, 13 July 1942, 22 February 1955, 31 December 1956, and 22 February 1968)
- Order of Kutuzov 1st class (4 November 1981)
- Order of Alexander Nevsky (5 November 1944)
- Order of the Patriotic War 1st class (22 September 1943)
- Two Order of the Red Star (15 November 1950)
- Order for Service to the Homeland in the Armed Forces of the USSR 3rd class (17 February 1976)
- Honoured Military Pilot of the USSR (16 August 1966)
- Lenin Prize (16 August 1983)

Foreign

- UK - Commander of the Order of the British Empire (1943)
- Poland - Order of Polonia Restituta (6 October 1973)
- Bulgaria - Order of the People's Republic of Bulgaria 1st class (14 September 1974)
- East Germany - Patriotic Order of Merit 1st class (March 1977)
- Mongolia - Order of Sukhbaatar (11 June 1981)
- Romania - Order of 23 August (1 October 1974)
- Hungary - Order of the Red Banner (16 May 1978)
- Czechoslovakia - Order of the Red Star (6 October 1982)
- Egypt - Order of the Nile (December 1972)
- Peru - Order of the Sun (November 1972)

== Footnotes ==
Military offices
| Preceded by Konstantin Vershinin | Commander-in-Chief of the Soviet Air Force; 1969–1984 | Succeeded by Alexander Yefimov |
