= Mikhail Vorobyov (engineer) =

Russian military engineer (1896–1957)

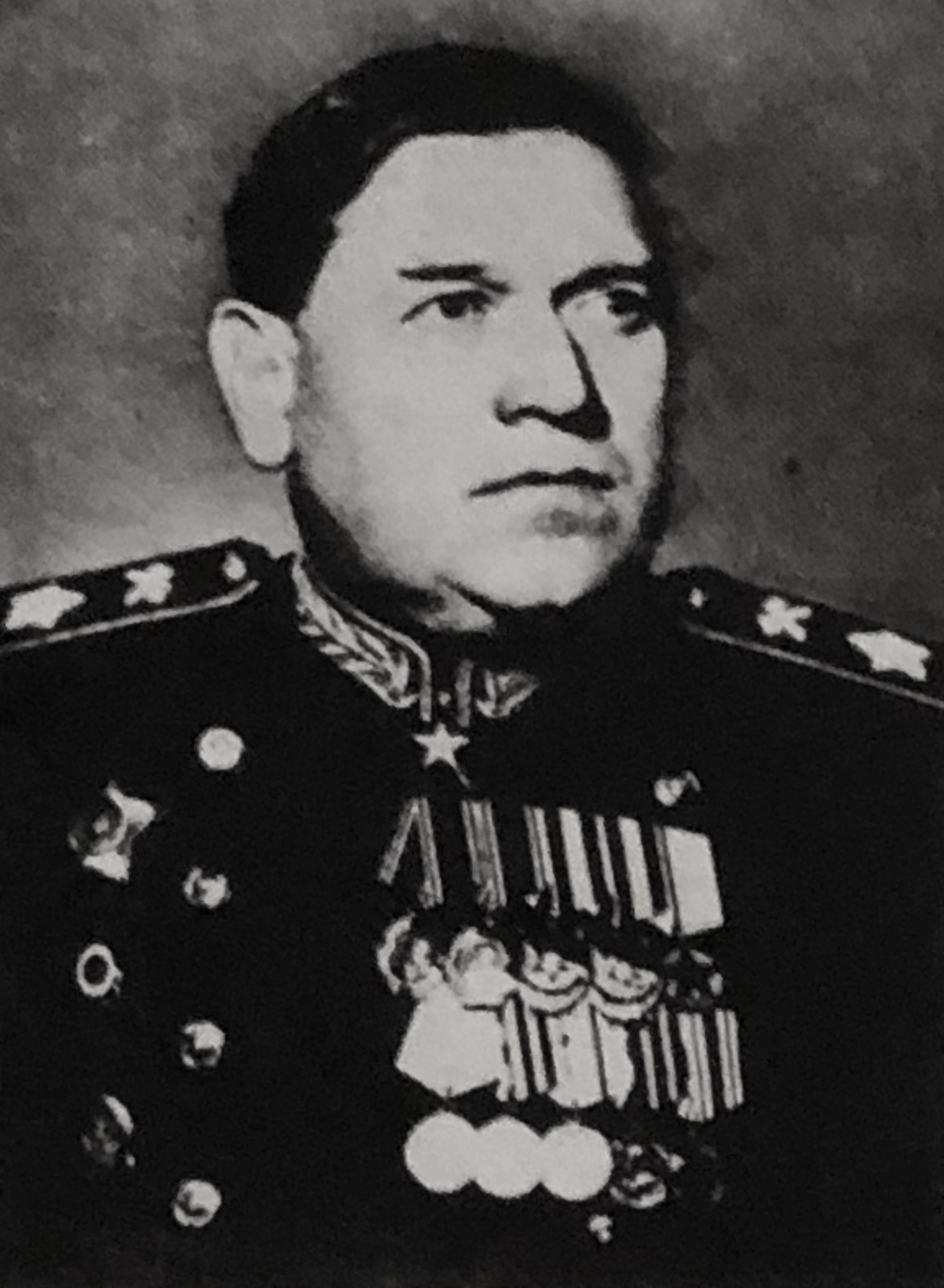
- Born: Mikhail Petrovich Vorobyov; December 29, 1896; Khasavyurt, Terek Oblast, Russian Empire
- Died: June 12, 1957 (aged 60); Moscow, Soviet Union
- Military career
- Allegiance: Russian Empire (1916–1917); Soviet Union (1918–1957)
- Branch: Imperial Russian Army; Red Army
- Rank
- Commands: Engineer Troops of Soviet army
- Conflicts: World War I; Russian Civil War; World War II; Winter War; Eastern Front
- Awards: Order of Lenin (2); Order of the Red Banner (3); Order of Suvorov, 1st Class; Order of the Patriotic War, 1st class Order of the Red Banner of Labour; Jubilee Medal "XX Years of the Workers' and Peasants' Red Army"; Medal "For the Defence of Leningrad"; Medal "For the Defence of Moscow"; Medal "For the Defence of Stalingrad"; Medal "For the Victory over Germany in the Great Patriotic War 1941–1945"; Medal "For the Victory over Japan"

Mikhail Petrovich Vorobyov (December 29, 1896 – June 12, 1957) was a Soviet Marshal of the engineer troops from the start of World War II (1941–1945) – inspector-general of engineer troops, then chief of engineer troops of the Western Front, and later commander of the 1st Field Engineer Army (1944).

== Early life ==
Mikhail Petrovich Vorobyov was born December 29, 1896, in Khasavyurt, Terek Oblast. He came from the family of a prominent railway engineer.

== Military service ==
In 1916, Vorobyov was drafted into the Russian Imperial Army.

He joined the Red Army in 1918.

In the Battle of Moscow, he was one of the leaders in building defenses on the approaches to Moscow and engineer support of the West Front offensive.

In April 1942, he became commander of engineer troops of the Red Army. He headed the building of defenses near Stalingrad, coordinated actions of the engineer troops of the Leningrad and Volkhov fronts in lifting the Leningrad blockade; did a great amount of work in preparing defenses in the Battle of the Kursk Bulge and made a tangible contribution to engineering support in crossing major water obstacles, especially the Dnieper. He left his position in 1952.

== Bibliography ==
- Сборник (4 April 2020). Сталинградская битва. Июль 1942 – февраль 1943 [Battle of Stalingrad. July 1942 - February 1943] (in Russian). ЛитРес. ISBN 9785042445477.
- Соловьев, Денис (17 December 2019). Комбриги РККА 1935-1940. (in Russian). Vol. 6. SelfPub. ISBN 9785042218422.
- Залесский, Константин (11 March 2020). Великая Отечественная война. Большая биографическая энциклопедия [The Great Patriotic War. Big biographical encyclopedia] (in Russian). АСТ. ISBN 9785457276970.
