= Fedor Falaleyev =

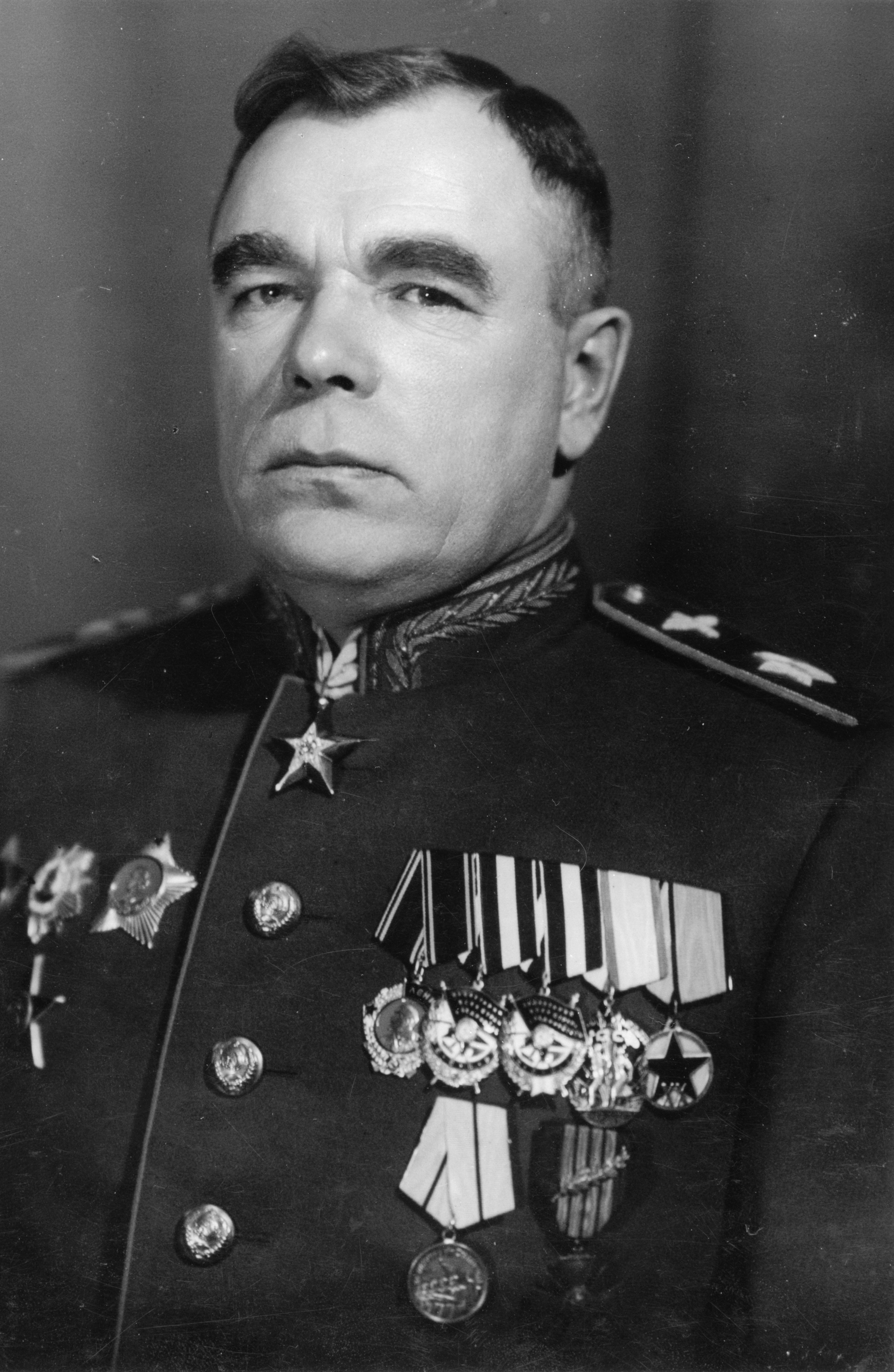
Falaleyev in uniform c. 1945–1949

Fedor Yakovlevich Falaleyev (Russian: Фёдор Я́ковлевич Фалале́ев; May 19, 1899 – August 12, 1955) was a Soviet Marshal of the aviation.

== Early life ==
Falaleyev was born on 31 May 1899 in Polyanskoye, Vyatka Governorate (present-day Udmurtia), Russian Empire.

== Military career ==
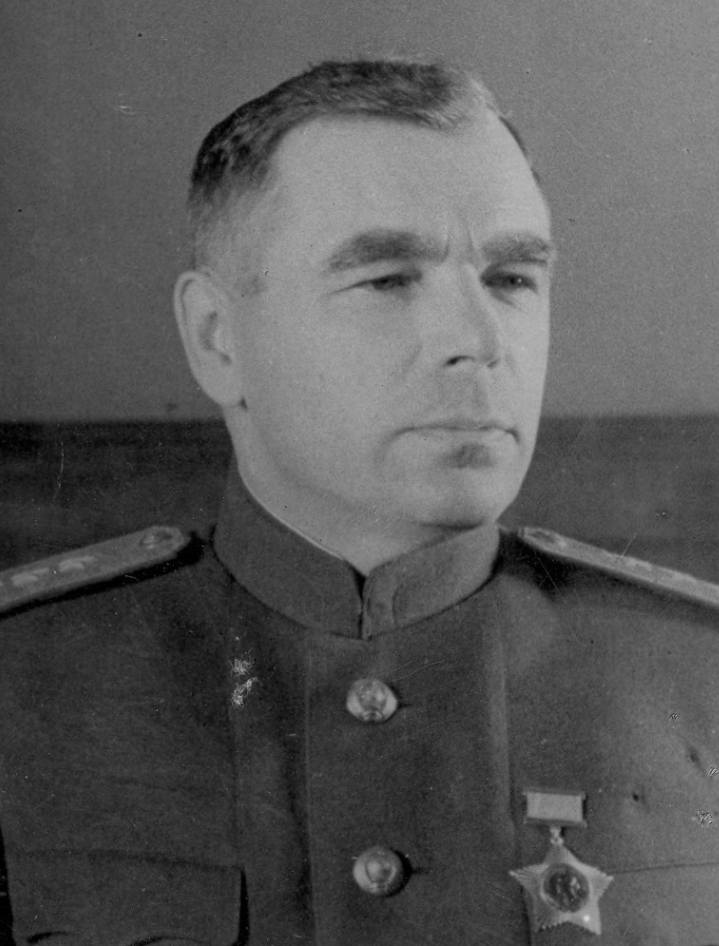
Falaleyev in 1944

At the beginning of World War II he commanded the air forces of the 3rd Army, becoming inspector-general of the Soviet Air Force in 1940. Following the German invasion in 1941, he commanded the air forces of the South-Western Front, and became deputy commander and chief of staff of the Soviet Air Force later in the war. As representative of the Supreme Command Headquarters for aviation he coordinated actions of air armies in various directions, took part in operations to liberate the Donbas area, Southern Ukraine and the Crimea and also in the Belarusian, Baltic and East Prussian operations.

Following the war, Marshal Falaleyev ran the Gagarin Air Force Academy in Monino, a leading Soviet training and research facility until his death in 1955. He retired from the Air Force in 1950.

== Medals and awards ==
- Order of Lenin (1945)
- Order of the Red Banner, three times (1942, 1944, 1949)
- Order of Suvorov, 1st class, twice (1944, 1945), 2nd class (1944)
- Order of Kutuzov, 1st class (1944)
- Order of the Red Star (1941)
- Order of the Badge of Honour (1936)
- Jubilee Medal "XX Years of the Workers' and Peasants' Red Army" (22 February 1938)
- Medal "For the Defence of Stalingrad" (22 December 1942)
- Medal "For the Victory over Germany in the Great Patriotic War 1941–1945" (9 May 1945)
- Commander of the Legion of Honour (France, 1944)
