= Anatoly Konstantinov =

Aviator

- Native name: Анатолий Фёдорович Константинов
- Born: 12 June 1923; Moscow, Russian SFSR, USSR
- Died: 26 October 2006 (aged 83) Moscow, Russia
- Allegiance: Soviet Union
- Branch: Soviet Air Force
- Service years: 1940–1992
- Rank: Marshal of Aviation
- Conflicts: World War II
- Awards: Hero of the Soviet Union

Anatoly Ustinovich Konstantinov (Russian: Анатолий Устинович Константинов; 12 June 1923 – 22 October 2006) was a senior military officer who served as commander of the Moscow Air Defence District from 1980 to 1987. During World War II, he was a fighter pilot and a flying ace for which he was awarded the title Hero of the Soviet Union.

== Early life ==
Konstantinov was born in 1923 into a working-class family of Russian ethnicity. He graduated from nine classes of high school and later joined a flying club.

== Military career ==
In 1940, he was called up for military service on a Komsomol ticket to the Red Army. He graduated from the Tbilisi Military Aviation School of Pilots in 1941 and was assigned to 8th Reserve Fighter Aviation Regiment near Saratov.

=== World War II ===
Konstantinov took part in the battles at the Eastern Front from August 1941. He served as a pilot, flight commander and commander of a fighter squadron in the 85th Guards Fighter Aviation Regiment, and flew missions mostly in the Yak-1, Yak-9 and Yak-3. He took part in the Battle of Stalingrad and Crimean offensive, and in liberation of Poland, Romania, Czechoslovakia, Hungary and Austria, while assigned to the Southern, 1st Ukrainian, 2nd Ukrainian and 4th Ukrainian Fronts. He joined the Communist Party of the Soviet Union in 1943. He flew escort missions for Il-2 attack aircraft, which, under his cover, had suffered no losses from enemy aircraft.

By February 1945, he flew 294 sorties and took part in 90 air battles, where he personally shot down 19 enemy aircraft. For these exploits, he was presented for the title of Hero of the Soviet Union. The corresponding decree of the Presidium of the Supreme Soviet of the USSR was signed only on 15 May 1946.

He continued to fly missions until V-E Day. By the end of the war, he flew 327 sorties and took part in 96 air battles, and personally shot down 22 enemy aircraft. He was wounded several times and once managed to make an emergency landing of his damaged aircraft.

=== Post war ===
After the war, he served as commander of an aviation squadron and deputy commander of a fighter aviation regiment. From November 1952, he commanded a fighter aviation regiment and from February 1956, he was appointed as deputy commander and from March 1957, commander of a fighter aviation division in the Air Force.

In April 1958, he was transferred to the Soviet Air Defence Forces, where he also became the commander of an aviation division. In 1964 he graduated from the Military Academy of the General Staff and from 1968, he commanded an air defense corps.

In December 1970, he was appointed as commander of the 11th Separate Red Banner Air Defense Army in Khabarovsk and from 1973, he commanded the Baku Air Defence District and in 1980, he was appointed as commander of the Moscow Air Defence District. In 1982, he graduated from the higher academic courses at the Military Academy of the General Staff and was awarded the military rank of Marshal of Aviation on 30 April 1985. In 1987, he, Soviet Minister of Defense Sergey Sokolov and hundreds of other officers were dismissed by Mikhail Gorbachev as a result of the Mathias Rust affair.

From 1987 till the dissolution of the Soviet Union in 1991, he served as the military inspector and adviser of the Group of Inspectors General of the USSR Ministry of Defense. He retired from military service in May 1992.

Konstantinov was a member of the Central Auditing Commission of the CPSU from 1981 to 1986, candidate member of the Central Committee of the CPSU from 1986 to 1989 and deputy from Ryazan Oblast at the Soviet of the Union during 9th to 11th convocations from 1974 to 1989.

== Later life ==
In the last years of his life, he served as an adviser to the commander of the Special Purpose Command of the Russian Air Force.

Konstantinov died on 22 October 2006, at the age of 83. He was buried at the Troyekurovskoye Cemetery.

== Awards and decorations ==
USSR and Russia

Hero of the Soviet Union (15 May 1946)
Order of Lenin, twice (15 May 1946, ?)
Order For Merit to the Fatherland, 4th class
Order of the Red Banner, four times (2 August 1943, 15 February 1944, ?, ?)
Order of Alexander Nevsky (22 February 1945)
Order of the Patriotic War, 1st class, twice (6 June 1945, 11 March 1985)
Order of the Patriotic War, 2nd class (23 May 1945)
Order of the Red Star, twice (5 January 1943, ?)
Medal "For Battle Merit"
Medal of Zhukov
Order "For Service to the Homeland in the Armed Forces of the USSR", 3rd class (1975)
Medal "For Distinction in Guarding the State Border of the USSR"
Medal "For the Defence of Stalingrad" (1942)
Medal "For the Capture of Budapest" (1945)
Medal "For the Capture of Vienna" (1945)
Medal "For the Victory over Germany in the Great Patriotic War 1941–1945" (1945)

- jubilee medals
- Honorary citizen of Sevastopol

Foreign

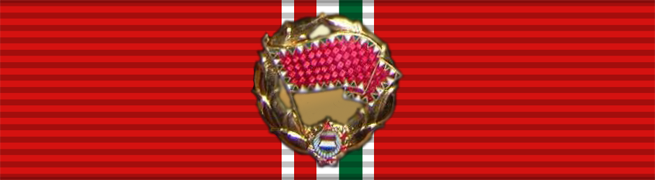
Order of the Red Star (Czechoslovakia)
Order of the Red Banner (Hungary)
Order of the Polar Star (Mongolia)
Medal "50 Years of the Mongolian People's Revolution" (Mongolia)
Medal "60 Years of the Mongolian People's Army" (Mongolia)
Silver Cross of Merit (Poland)
Brotherhood of Arms Medal (Poland)
Order of Tudor Vladimirescu, 2nd class (Romania)

- Honorary citizen of Židlochovice (Czech Republic)
