= Nikolai Skomorokhov =

Soviet flying ace (1920–1994)

Nikolai Mikhailovich Skomorokhov
- Николай Михайлович Скоморохов
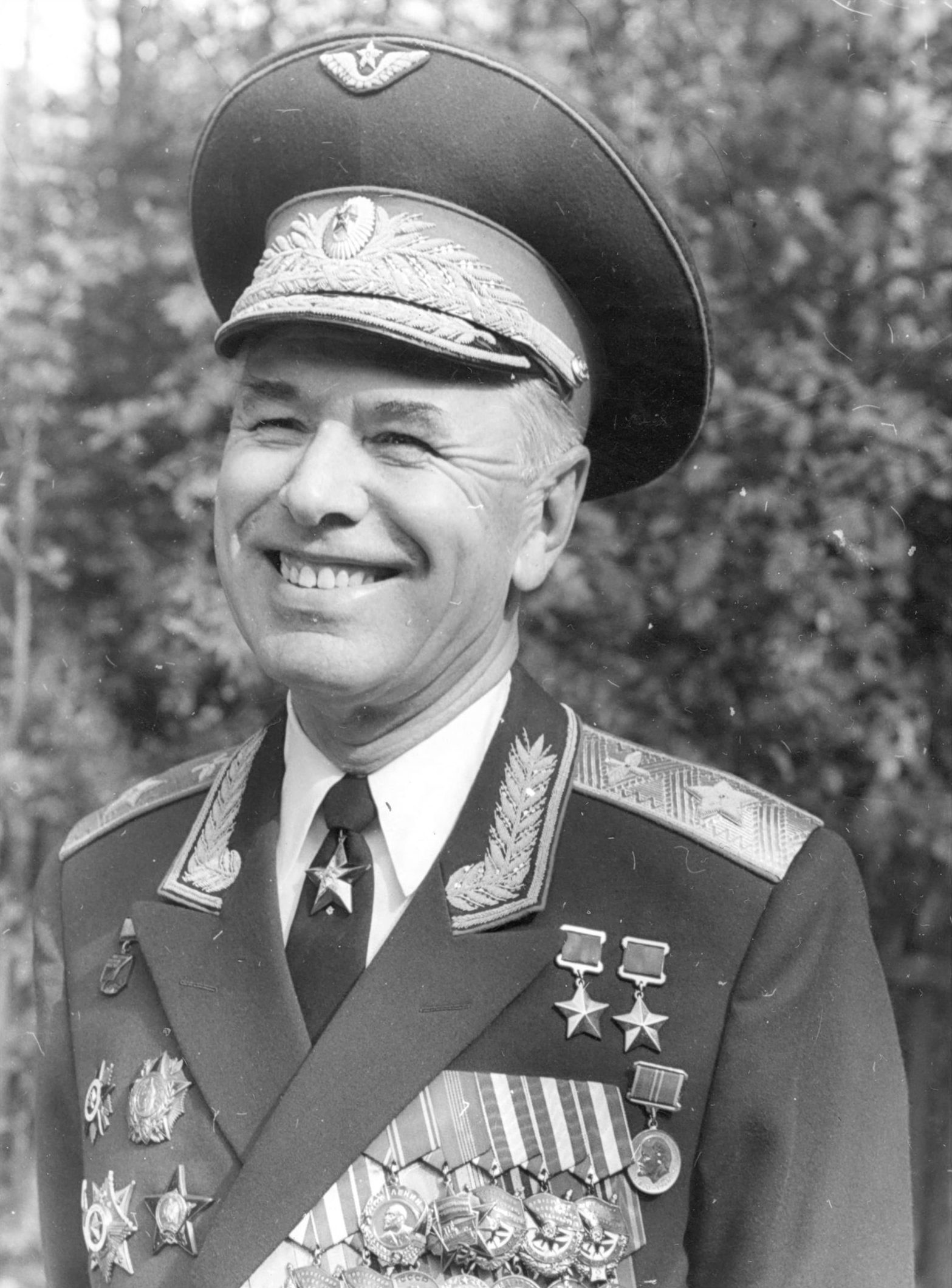
- Born: 19 May 1920; Lapot village, Saratov Governorate, Russian SFSR (present-day Belogorskoye, Krasnoarmeysky District, Saratov Oblast, Russia)
- Died: 14 October 1994 (aged 74); Monino, Russian Federation
- Military career
- Allegiance: Soviet Union
- Branch: Soviet Air Force
- Service years: 1940–1992
- Rank: Marshal of Aviation
- Unit: 31st Fighter Aviation Regiment
- Conflicts: World War II
- Awards: Hero of the Soviet Union (twice)

Nikolai Mikhailovich Skomorokhov (Russian: Николай Михайлович Скоморохов; 19 May 1920 – 14 October 1994) was a flying ace in the Soviet Air Forces who scored over 40 individual shootdowns of enemy aircraft during the Second World War. He was twice awarded the title Hero of the Soviet Union and went on to become a Marshal of Aviation.

== Early life ==
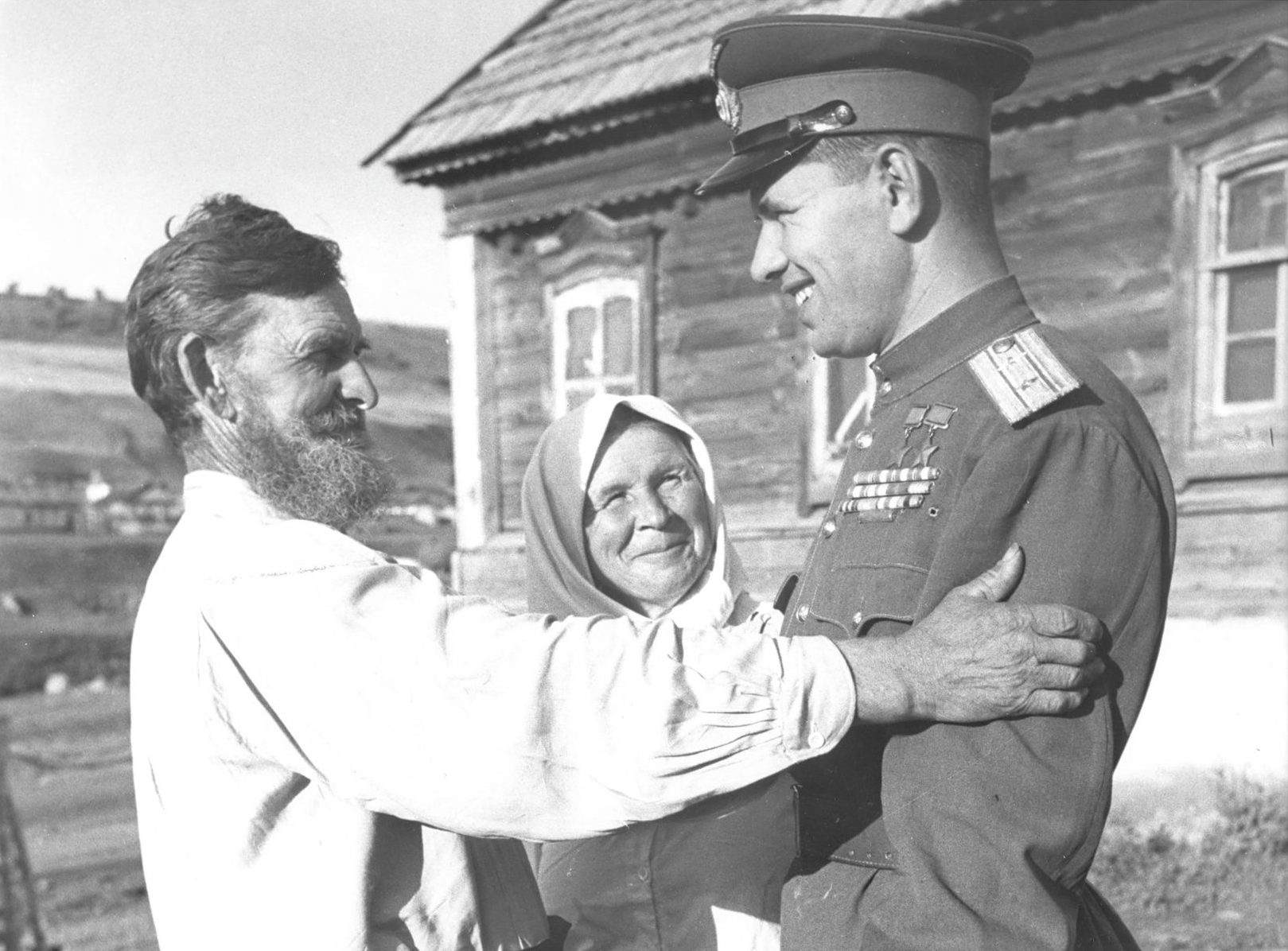
Skomorokhov reunites with his parents in his hometown of Lapot, 1946.

Skomorokhov was born on 19 May 1922 to a Russian peasant family in the village of Lapot before the formation of the Soviet Union. He lived in the city of Astrakhan since 1931. Once he completed secondary school in 1935, he entered a vocational school. Upon entering the vocational school, he wrote in documents that he older than he actually was, claiming to be born in 1920. After completing his training at the vocational school he worked as a mechanic and turner a factory before he began studying at the Astrakhan Technical School in 1939. In 1940 he completed his studies at the technical school and graduated from training local aeroclub, after which he entered the military in December. In March 1942 he graduated from the Bataysk Military Aviation School of Pilots, which had been relocated to Yevlakh due to the German invasion of the Soviet Union. From March to October 1942 he was assigned to the 25th Reserve Aviation Regiment, where he trained on the LaGG-3 in Adzhikabul until his was deployed to the warfront.

== World War II ==
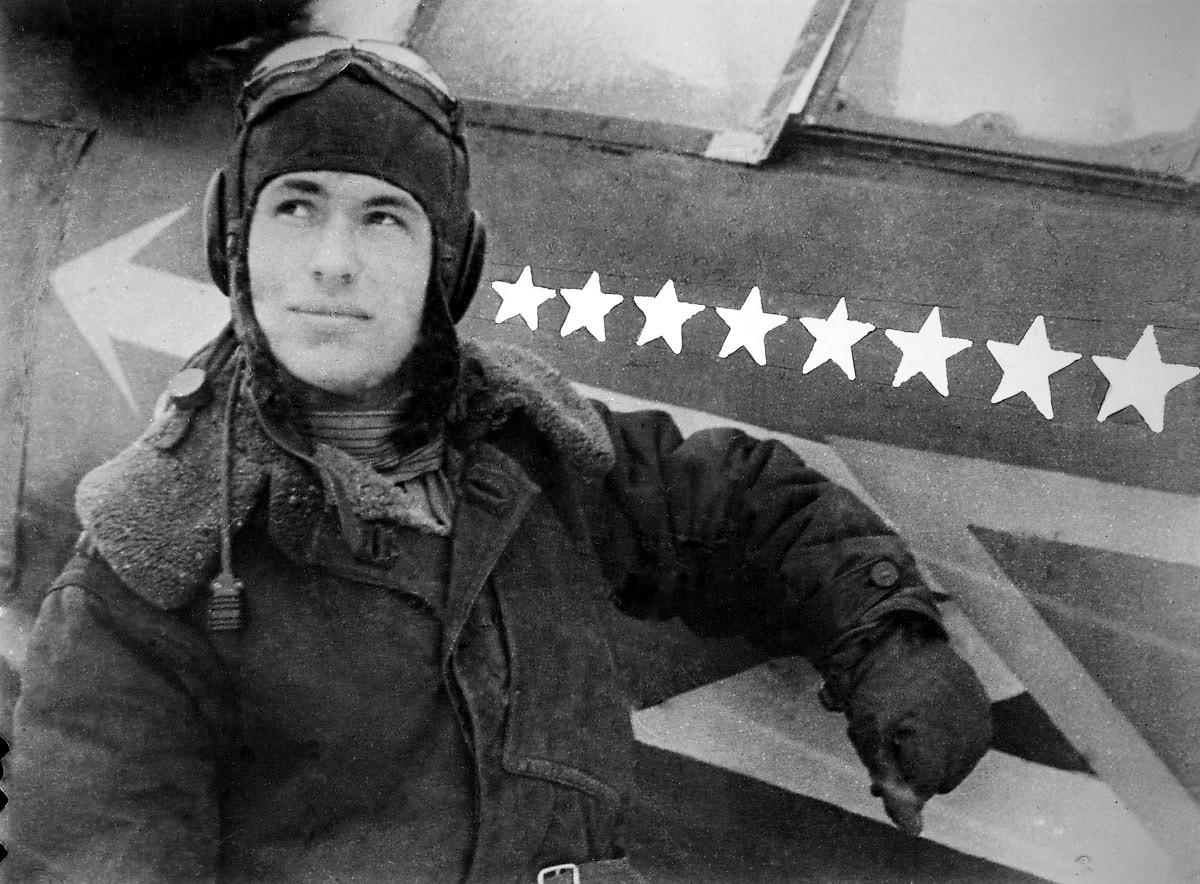
Skomorokhov posing next to his Lavochkin La-5 fighter plane, 1944.

In November 1942 Skomorokhov arrived at the warfront as a junior pilot in the 164th Fighter Aviation Regiment. He barely survived one of his first sorties after he got cut off from the rest of his squadron and was chased by multiple Messerschmitts; only his skillful maneuvering saved him and his fighter from the Luftwaffe. On 2 January 1943 he scored his first aerial victory, a shared kill of an Fw 190. It was not until 22 February 1943 that he scored his first solo victory when he shot down a Ju 87 dive bomber. He scored one more aerial victory while flying the LaGG-33 in March before he switched to flying the La-5. His first victory on the La-5 in June after he shot down an Me-109. That victory was recreated in a Soviet propaganda film, which showed him taking off from the airfield and shooting down the enemy plane right after a meeting about his application to join the Communist Party. Throughout the summer of 1943 he rapidly grew his victory tally, and by the end of the year he had claimed 13 solo shootdowns of enemy aircraft. When he switched to flying the La-5 in Spring 1945, he managed to gain nine aerial victories over the course of one month.

In 1944 Skomorokhov was selected as the deputy commander of a free-hunting "squadron of aces" formed out of the best pilots of the 295th Fighter Aviation Division. His colleagues there included flying aces Oleg Smirnov and Anatoly Volodin, who were also awarded the title Hero of the Soviet Union. While the squadron did shoot down dozens of enemy aircraft, it was disbanded after three months of existence since regimental commanders in the 295th Fighter Aviation Division wanted their aces back and the regiments they left suffered higher casualty rates in their absence. After the squadron was disbanded, he was assigned in April as the deputy squadron commander of the 1st squadron of the 31st Fighter Aviation Regiment, which had worked closely with the "squadron of aces" when it existed and shared an airbase with them; he was eventually promoted to the position of squadron commander.

Over Czechoslovakia near Székesfehérvár in December 1944, Skomorokhov shot down four enemy aircraft in one day after he led an attack on a group of eight Fw 190 and two Me-109 in one mission and then attacked another group of eight Fw 190 in another mission. During the first engagement, his wingman was shot down by an Me-109, but on the second mission, his wingman shot down an Fw 190. On 28 December he was nominated for the title Hero of the Soviet Union, which he received on 23 February 1945. After gaining more aerial victories he was nominated for a second gold star on 27 February 1945, which was awarded after the war on 18 August 1945.

Throughout the course of the war he fought in the 5th and 17th Air Armies on the Transcaucasian, North Caucasian, Southwestern and 3rd Ukrainian fronts, and participated in military operations over Caucasus, Ukraine, Moldova, Romania, Bulgaria, Yugoslavia, Hungary, Czechoslovakia, and Austria. In total, he scored 44 solo and three shared confirmed aerial victories, having made 605 sorties and engaged in 143 dogfights. Despite the odds being against him, he was never shot down or wounded.

== Postwar ==
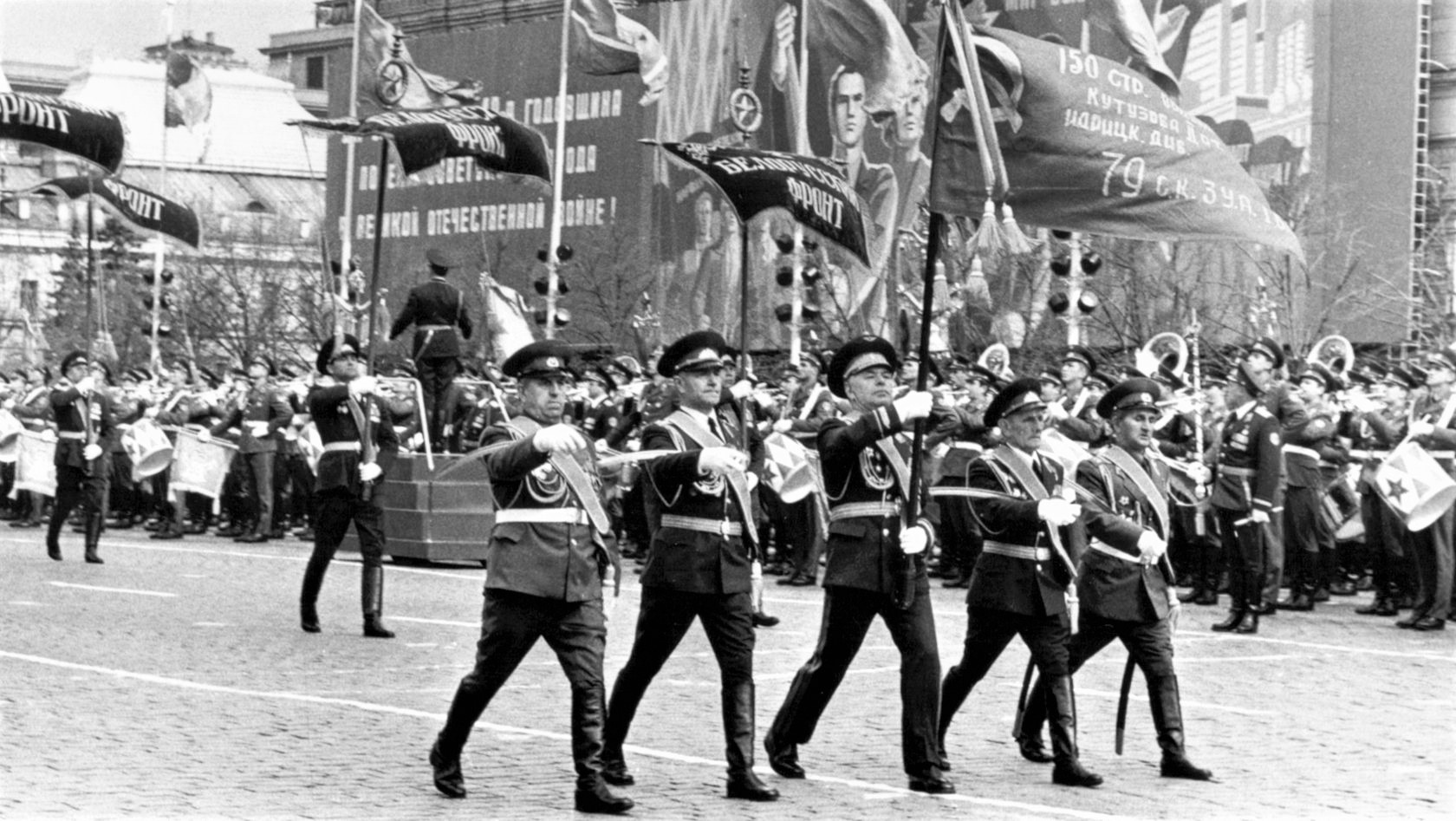
Nikolai Skomorokhov carrying the Victory Banner across Red Square at the 1985 Moscow Victory Day Parade.

Initially he remained in his position as a squadron commander in the 31st Fighter Aviation Regiment based in Bulgaria, but he later left the position to attend the M. V. Frunze Military Academy, which he graduated from in November 1949. From January 1950 to May 1952 he served as the commander of the 111th Guards Fighter Aviation Regiment, based in Ukraine; he then became the deputy commander of the 279th Fighter Aviation Division before he was made the commander of the 246th Fighter Aviation Division in January 1954. In 1958 he graduated from the Military Academy of General Staff, after which he was assigned to the post of first deputy commander of the 71st Fighter Aviation Corps, which was part of the Soviet forces stationed in East Germany. In February 1961 he became the commander of the unit, and in April 1968 he was promoted to be the commander of the 69th Air Army, which was renamed the 17th Air Army in April 1972. By that year he accumulated 3,500 flight hours. He served as the chief of the Gagarin Air Force Academy from August 1973 until October 1988, during which he was promoted to the rank of Marshal of Aviation in 1981. From 1988 until his retirement in 1992 he served as an advisor to the Ministry of Defense of the USSR. In addition to his role in the military he served as a deputy in the Supreme Soviet from 1963 to 1974. He was killed in a car accident in Monino on 14 October 1994 and was buried in the Novodevichy Cemetery.

== Awards and honors ==
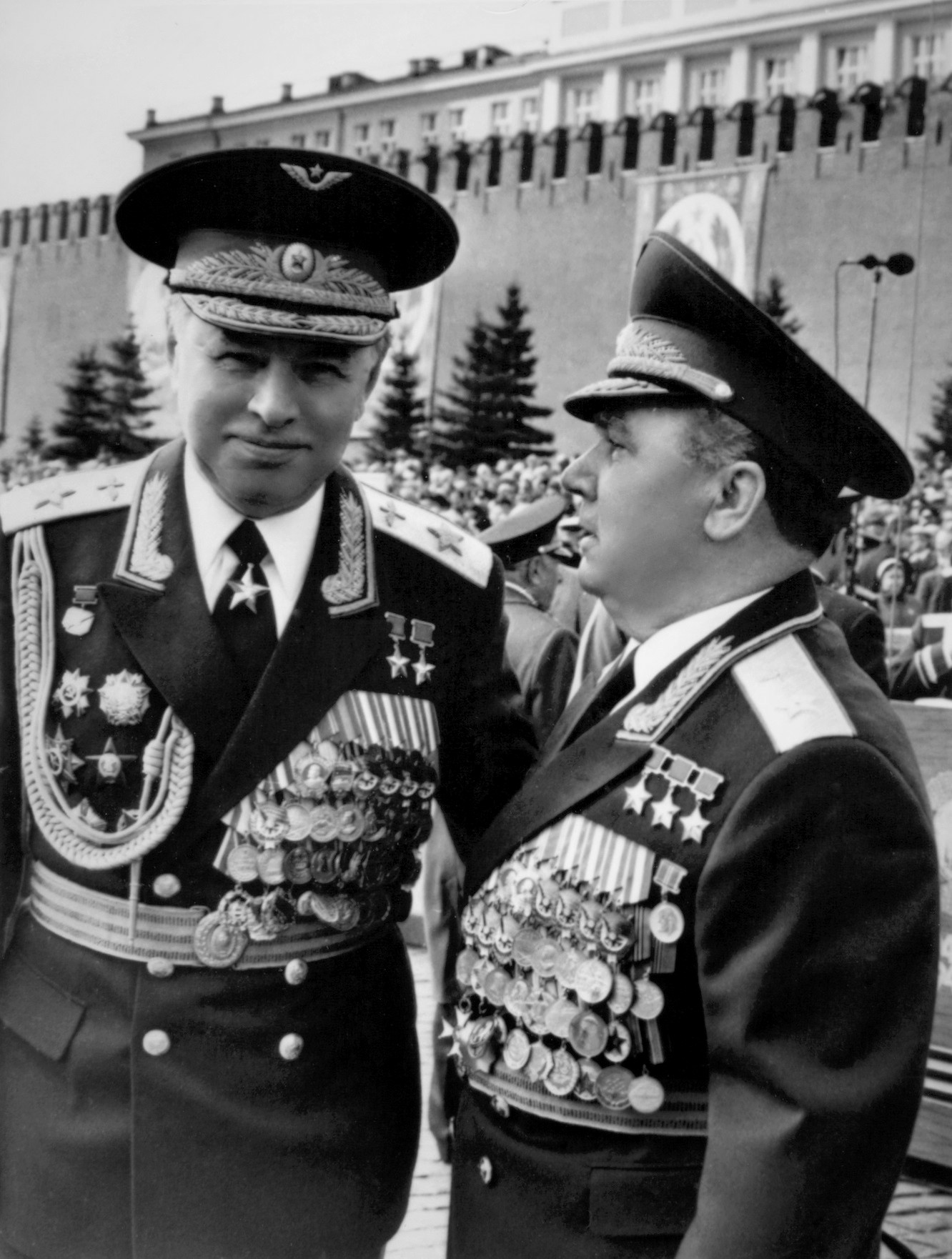
Skomorokhov and Ivan Kozhedub, 1985.

=== Soviet ===
- Twice Hero of the Soviet Union (23 February 1945 and 18 August 1945)
- Order of Lenin (23 February 1945)
- Order of the October Revolution (8 January 1980)
- Five Order of the Red Banner (30 July 1943, 25 January 1944, 30 December 1944, 31 January 1945, and 20 February 1968)
- Order of Aleksandr Nevsky (17 December 1944)
- Two Order of the Patriotic War 1st class (29 April 1944 and 11 March 1985)
- Order of the Red Star (30 December 1956)
- Order "For Service to the Homeland in the Armed Forces of the USSR" 2nd and 3rd class (3rd class - 30 April 1975; 2nd class - 19 February 1988)
- Honored Military Pilot of the USSR (17 August 1971)
- campaign and jubilee medals

=== International ===
- Yugoslavia - Order of the Partisan Star (30 April 1945)
- Hungary - Order of the Red Banner (4 April 1955)
- Mongolia - Order "For Military Merit" (9 July 1981)
- Bulgaria - Order of the People's Republic 2nd class (22 January 1985)

== See also ==
- List of twice Heroes of the Soviet Union
- List of World War II aces from the Soviet Union
