= List of twice Heroes of the Soviet Union =

People awarded Hero of the Soviet Union on two occasions

This is a list of people who were awarded the title Hero of the Soviet Union two times. 154 people were double recipients of the award, three people were awarded it three times, and two people were awarded it four times.

Name	Award dates	Rank or Position	References
Vladimir Viktorovich Aksyonov; Владимир Викторович Аксёнов	28 September 1976; 16 June 1980	Flight engineer of Soyuz-22 Flight engineer of Soyuz T-2	
Aleksandr Pavlovich Aleksandrov; Александр Павлович Александров	23 November 1983; 29 December 1987	Flight engineer of Soyuz T-9 and Salyut-7 Flight engineer of Soyuz TM-2, Soyuz TM-3, Mir, and Kvant	
Vladimir Avramovich Aleksenko; Владимир Аврамович Алексенко	19 April 1945; 29 June 1945	Squadron commander in the 15th Guards Assault Aviation Regiment Deputy commander of the 15th Guards Assault Aviation Regiment	
Aleksey Vasilyevich Alelyukhin; Алексей Васильевич Алелюхин	24 August 1943; 1 November 1943	Squadron commander in the 9th Guards Fighter Aviation Regiment	
Amet-khan Sultan; Amet-han Sultan	24 August 1943; 29 June 1945	Squadron commander in the 9th Guards Fighter Aviation Regiment	
Vasily Ivanovich Andrianov; Василий Иванович Андрианов	1 July 1944; 27 June 1945	Flight commander in the 667th Assault Aviation Regiment Squadron commander in the 141st Guards Assault Aviation Regiment	
Stepan Yelizarovich Artyomenko; Степан Елизарович Артёменко	27 February 1945; 31 May 1945	Rifle battalion commander of the 447th Rifle Regiment	
Vasily Sergeyevich Arkhipov; Василий Сергеевич Архипов	21 March 1940; 23 September 1944	Tank company commander of the 112th Tank Battalion Commander of the 53rd Guards Tank Brigade	
Hazi Ahad oglu Aslanov; Həzi Əhəd oğlu Aslanov	22 December 1942; 12 July 1991	Commander of the 55th Separate Tank Regiment Commander of the 35th Guards Tank Brigade	
Ivan Khristoforovich Bagramyan; Իվան Քրիստափորի Բաղրամյան	29 July 1944; 1 December 1977	Commander of the 1st Baltic Front Inspector-general in the Ministry of Defense	
Pavel Ivanovich Batov; Павел Иванович Батов	30 October 1943; 2 June 1945	Commander of the 65th Army	
Talgat Jakypbekuly Bigeldinov; Талғат Жақыпбекұлы Бигелдинов	26 October 1944; 27 June 1945	Deputy Squadron commander in the 144th Guards Assault Aviation Regiment Squadron commander in the 144th Guards Assault Aviation Regiment	
Leonid Ignatyevich Beda; Леонид Игнатьевич Беда	26 October 1944; 29 June 1945	Squadron commander in the 75th Guards Assault Aviation Regiment Assistant commander of the 75th Guards Assault Aviation Regiment	
Afanasy Pavlantyevich Beloborodov; Афанасий Павлантьевич Белобородов	22 July 1944; 19 April 1945	Commander of the 43rd Army	
Georgy Timofeyevich Beregovoy; Георгий Тимофеевич Береговой	26 April 1944; 1 November 1968	Squadron commander in the 90th Guards Assault Aviation Regiment Commander of Soyuz 3	
Semyon Ilyich Bogdanov; Семён Ильич Богданов	11 March 1944; 6 April 1945	Commander of the 2nd Tank Army Commander of the 2nd Guards Tank Army	
Ivan Nikiforovich Boyko; Иван Никифорович Бойко	10 January 1944; 24 April 1944	Commander of the 69th Guards Tank Regiment 64th Guards Tank Brigade	
Mikhail Zakharovich Bondarenko; Михаил Захарович Бондаренко	6 June 1942; 24 August 1943	Squadron commander in the 198th Assault Aviation Regiment Navigator of the 198th Assault Aviation Regiment	
Andrey Yegorovich Borovykh; Андрей Егорович Боровых	24 August 1943; 23 February 1945	Flight commander in the 157th Fighter Aviation Regiment Squadron commander in the 157th Fighter Aviation Regiment	
Anatoly Yakovlevich Brandys; Анатолий Яковлевич Брандыс	23 February 1945; 29 June 1945	Deputy Squadron commander in the 75th Guards Assault Aviation Regiment Squadron commander in the 75th Guards Assault Aviation Regiment	
Valery Fyodorovich Bykovsky; Валерий Фёдорович Быковский	22 June 1963; 28 September 1976	Pilot of Vostok 5 Commander of Soyuz 22	
Aleksandr Mikhailovich Vasilevsky; Александр Михайлович Василевский	29 June 1944; 8 September 1945	Chief of the General Staff of the Red Army Commander-in-Chief of Soviet troops in the Far East Directorate	
Vladislav Nikolayevich Volkov; Владислав Николаевич Волков	22 October 1969; 30 June 1971	Flight engineer of Soyuz 7 Flight engineer of Soyuz 11	
Boris Valentinovich Volynov; Борис Валентинович Волынов	22 January 1969; 1 September 1976	Commander of Soyuz 5 Commander of Soyuz 21 and Salyut 5	
Ivan Alekseyevich Vorobyov; Иван Алексеевич Воробьёв	19 August 1944; 29 June 1945	Flight commander in the 76th Guards Assault Aviation Regiment Squadron commander in the 76th Guards Assault Aviation Regiment	
Arseny Vasilyevich Vorozheykin; Арсений Васильевич Ворожейкин	4 February 1944; 19 August 1944	Squadron commander in the 728th Fighter Aviation Regiment	
Kliment Yefremovich Voroshilov; Климент Ефремович Ворошилов	3 February 1956; 22 February 1968	Marshal of the Soviet Union	
Musa Gaysinovich Gareyev; Муса Ғaйса улы Гәрәев	23 February 1945; 19 April 1945	Squadron commander in the 76th Guards Assault Aviation Regiment	
Vasily Afanasyevich Glazunov; Василий Афанасьевич Глазунов	19 March 1944; 6 April 1945	Commander of the 4th Guards Rifle Corps	
Dmitry Borisovich Glinka; Дмитрий Борисович Глинка	21 April 1943; 24 August 1943	Assistant commander of the 45th Guards Fighter Aviation Regiment Assistant commander of 100th Guards Fighter Aviation Regiment	
Aleksandr Alekseyevich Golovachev; Александр Алексеевич Головачёв	23 September 1944; 6 April 1945	23rd Guards Motorized Rifle Brigade	
Pavel Yakovlevich Golovachev; Павел Яковлевич Головачёв	1 November 1943; 29 June 1945	Flight commander in the 9th Guards Fighter Aviation Regiment Deputy squadron commander in the 9th Guards Fighter Aviation Regiment	
Viktor Maksimovich Golubev; Виктор Максимович Голубев	12 August 1942; 24 August 1943	Flight commander in the 285th Assault Aviation Regiment Squadron commander in the 58th Guards Assault Aviation Regiment	
Viktor Vasilyevich Gorbatko; Виктор Васильевич Горбатко	22 October 1969; 5 March 1977	Research engineer on Soyuz 7 Commander of Soyuz 24 and Salyut 5	
Sergey Georgievich Gorshkov; Сергей Георгиевич Горшков	7 May 1965; 21 December 1982	Commander-in-Chief of the Soviet Navy	
Nikolai Ivanovich Goryushkin; Николай Иванович Горюшкин	10 January 1944; 10 April 1945	Company commander in the 22nd Guards Motorized Rifle Brigade Battalion commander in the 22nd Guards Motorized Rifle Brigade	
Andrey Antonovich Grechko; Андрей Антонович Гречко	1 February 1958; 16 October 1973	Marshall of the Soviet Union	
Georgy Mikhaylovich Grechko; Георгий Михайлович Гречко	12 February 1975; 16 March 1978	Flight engineer of Soyuz 17 Flight engineer of Soyuz 26	
Sergey Ivanovich Gritsevets; Сергей Иванович Грицевец	22 February 1939; 29 August 1939	Squadron commander of fighters in the Spanish Civil War Commander of a unit of I-153 fighters in the Battles for Khalkhin Gol	
Aleksey Aleksandrovich Gubarev; Алексей Александрович Губарев	12 February 1975; 16 March 1978	Commander of the Soyuz 17 and Salyut 4 Commander of Soyuz 28 and Salyut 6	
Nikolai Dmitriyevich Gulayev; Николай Дмитриевич Гулаев	28 September 1943; 1 July 1944	Deputy squadron commander in the 27th Fighter Aviation Regiment Squadron commander in the 27th Fighter Aviation Regiment	
Iosif Iraklievich Gusakovsky; Иосиф Ираклиевич Гусаковский	23 September 1944; 6 April 1945	Commander of the 44th Guards Tank Brigade	
Sergey Prokofyevich Denisov; Сергей Прокофьевич Денисов	4 July 1937; 21 March 1940	Commander of the 41st Fighter Aviation Squadron Chief of the 7th Air Army	
Vladimir Aleksandrovich Dzhanibekov; Владимир Александрович Джанибеков	16 March 1978; 30 March 1981	Commander of Soyuz 26 and Soyuz 27 Commander of Soyuz T-4 and Soyuz 39	
David Abramovich Dragunsky; Давид Абрамович Драгунский	23 September 1944; 31 May 1945	55th Guards Tank Brigade	
Kirill Alekseyevich Yevstigneyev; Кирилл Алексеевич Евстигнеев	2 August 1944; 23 February 1945	Squadron commander in the 240th Fighter Aviation Regiment Squadron commander in the 178th Guards Fighter Aviation Regiment	
Aleksey Stanislavovich Yeliseyev; Алексей Станиславович Елисеев	22 January 1969; 22 October 1969	Flight engineer of Soyuz 4 and Soyuz 5 Flight engineer of Soyuz 8	
Aleksandr Nikolayevich Yefimov; Александр Николаевич Ефимов	26 October 1944; 18 August 1944	Squadron commander in the 198th Assault Aviation Regiment Navigator of the 62nd Assault Aviation Regiment	
Vasily Sergeyevech Yefremov; Василий Сергеевич Ефремов	1 May 1943; 24 August 1943	10th Guards Bomber Aviation Regiment	
Vasily Aleksandrovich Zaitsev; Василий Александрович Зайцев	5 May 1942; 24 August 1943	Navigator of the 5th Guards Fighter Aviation Regiment Commander of the 5th Guards Fighter Aviation Regiment	
Matvei Vasilyevich Zakharov; Матвей Васильевич Захаров	8 September 1945; 22 August 1971	Chief of Staff of the Kalinin, Reserve, Steppe, 2nd Ukrainian, and Trans-Baikal Fronts Inspector General in the Ministry of Defense of the USSR	
Aleksandr Sergeyevich Ivanchenkov; Александр Сергеевич Иванченков	2 November 1978; 2 July 1982	Flight engineer of Soyuz 29 and Salyut 6 Flight engineer of Soyuz T-5, Soyuz T-6, and Salyut 7	
Pavel Mikhailovich Kamozin; Павел Михайлович Камозин	1 May 1943; 1 July 1944	Deputy squadron commander in the 269th Fighter Aviation Regiment Squadron commander in the 66th Fighter Aviation Regiment	
Aleksandr Terentyevich Karpov; Александр Терентьевич Карпов	28 September 1943; 22 August 1944	Squadron commander in the 27th Guards Fighter Aviation Regiment	
Mikhail Yefimovich Katukov; Михаил Ефимович Катуков	23 September 1944; 6 April 1945	Commander of the 1st Guards Tank Army	
Leonid Denisovich Kizim; Леонид Денисович Кизим	10 December 1980; 2 October 1984	Commander of Soyuz T-3 and Salyut 6 Commander of Soyuz T-10 and Salyut 7	
Pyotr Ilyich Klimuk; Пётр Ильич Климук	28 December 1973; 27 July 1975	Commander of Soyuz 13 Commander of Soyuz 13 and Salyut 4	
Aleksandr Fyodorovich Klubov; Александр Фёдорович Клубов	13 April 1944; 27 July 1945	Deputy squadron commander in the 16th Guards Fighter Aviation Regiment Assistant commander of the 16th Guards Fighter Aviation Regiment	
Vladimir Vasilyevich Kovalyonok; Владимир Васильевич Ковалёнок	2 November 1978; 26 May 1981	Commander of Soyuz 29 and Salyut 6 Commander of Soyuz T-4 and Salyut 6	
Sydir Artemovych Kovpak; Сидір Артемович Ковпак	18 May 1942; 4 January 1944	Commander of the Putyvl Partisan Detachment	
Semyon Antonovich Kozak; Семён Антонович Козак	26 October 1943; 28 April 1945	Commander of the 73rd Guards Rifle Division	
Vladimir Konstantinovich Kokkinaki; Владимир Константинович Коккинаки	17 July 1938; 17 September 1957	Senior test pilot at the Ilyushin Aviation Complex	
Aleksandr Ivanovich Koldunov; Александр Иванович Колдунов	2 August 1944; 23 February 1948	Squadron commander in the 866th Fighter Aviation Regiment	
Vladimir Mikhailovich Komarov; Владимир Михайлович Комаров	19 October 1964; 24 April 1967	Senior Voskhod instructor-cosmonaut Commander of Soyuz 1	
Ivan Stepanovich Konev; Иван Степанович Конев	29 July 1944; 1 June 1945	Commander of the 1st Ukrainian Front	
Pyotr Kirillovich Koshevoy; Пётр Кириллович Кошевой	16 May 1944; 19 April 1945	Commander of the 63rd Rifle Corps Commander of the 36th Guards Rifle Corps	
Andrey Grigoryevich Kravchenko; Андрей Григорьевич Кравченко	10 January 1944; 8 September 1945	Commander of the 5th Guards Tank Corps Commander of the 6th Panzer Army	
Grigory Panteleyevich Kravchenko; Григорий Пантелеевич Кравченко	22 February 1939; 29 August 1939	Commander of a Fighter Aviation Unit of Soviet volunteers in China Commander of the 22nd Fighter Aviation Regiment	
Stepan Ivanovich Kretov; Степан Иванович Кретов	13 March 1944; 23 February 1948	Squadron commander in the 24th Guards Aviation Regiment	
Nikolai Ivanovich Krylov; Николай Иванович Крылов	19 April 1945; 8 September 1945	Commander of the 5th Army	
Valery Nikolayevich Kubasov; Валерий Николаевич Кубасов	22 October 1969; 22 July 1975	Flight engineer of Soyuz 6 Flight engineer of Soyuz 19	
Mikhail Vasilyevich Kuznetsov; Михаил Васильевич Кузнецов	8 September 1943; 27 June 1945	Commander of the 814th Fighter Aviation Regiment Commander of the 106th Guards Fighter Aviation Regiment	
Yevgeny Maksimovich Kungurtsev; Евгений Максимович Кунгурцев	23 February 1945; 19 April 1945	Flight commander in the 15th Guards Assault Aviation Regiment Squadron commander in the 15th Guards Assault Aviation Regiment	
Pavel Stepanovich Kutakhov; Павел Степанович Кутахов	1 May 1945; 15 August 1984	Squadron commander in the 19th Guards Fighter Aviation Regiment Commander-in-Chief of the Soviet Air Forces	
Vladimir Dmitrievich Lavrinenkov; Владимир Дмитриевич Лавриненков	1 May 1943; 1 July 1944	Deputy squadron commander in the 9th Guards Fighter Aviation Regiment Squadron commander in the 9th Guards Fighter Aviation Regiment	
Valentin Vitalyevich Lebedev; Валентин Витальевич Лебедев	28 December 1972; 10 December 1982	Flight engineer of Soyuz 13 Flight engineer of Soyuz T-5 and Salyut 7	
Dmitry Danilovich Lelyushenko; Дмитрий Данилович Лелюшенко	7 April 1940; 6 April 1945	Commander of the 39th Separate Tank Brigade	
Aleksey Arkhipovich Leonov; Алексей Архипович Леонов	23 March 1965; 22 July 1975	Copilot onboard Voskhod 2 Commander of Soyuz 19	
Viktor Nikolayevich Leonov; Виктор Николаевич Леонов	5 November 1944; 14 September 1945	Commander of a separate reconnaissance detachment in the Northern Fleet Commander of a separate intelligence detachment in the Pacific Fleet	
Sergey Danilovich Lugansky; Сергей Данилович Луганский	2 September 1943; 1 July 1944	Squadron commander in the 270th Fighter Aviation Regiment	
Vladimir Afanasyevich Lyakhov; Владимир Афанасьевич Ляхов	19 August 1979; 23 November 1983	Commander of Soyuz 32, Soyuz 34, and Salyut 6 Commander of Soyuz T-9, Kosmos-1443 and Salyut 7	
Aleksey Yefimovich Mazurenko; Алексей Ефимович Мазуренко	23 October 1942; 5 November 1944	Pilot in the 57th Assault Aviation Regiment Commander of the 7th Guards Assault Aviation Regiment	
Oleg Grigoryevich Makarov; Олег Григорьевич Макаров	2 October 1973; 16 March 1978	Flight engineer of Soyuz 12 Flight engineer of Soyuz 26, Soyuz 27, and Salyut 6	
Rodion Yakovlevich Malinovsky; Родион Яковлевич Малиновский	8 September 1945; 22 November 1958	Commander of the Trans-Baikal Front Minister of Defense of the USSR	
Yuri Vasilyevich Malyshev; Юрий Васильевич Малышев	16 June 1980; 11 April 1984	Commander of Soyuz T-2, Soyuz 36, and Salyut 6 Commander of Soyuz T-10, Soyuz T-11, and Salyut 7	
Ivan Kharlampovich Mikhailichenko; Иван Харлампович Михайличенко	1 July 1944; 27 June 1945	Senior pilot in the 667th Assault Aviation Regiment Squadron commander in the 141st Guards Assault Aviation Regiment	
Aleksandr Ignatyevich Molodchy; Александр Игнатьевич Молодчий	22 October 1941; 31 December 1942	Deputy squadron commander in the 420th Long-range Bomber Aviation Regiment Deputy squadron commander in the 2nd Guards Long-range Bomber Aviation Regiment	
Kirill Semyonovich Moskalenko; Кирилл Семёнович Москаленко	23 October 1943; 21 February 1978	Commander of the 40th Army Deputy Minister of Defense of the USSR	
Grigory Mikhailovich Mylnikov; Григорий Михайлович Мыльников	23 February 1945; 19 April 1945	Squadron commander in the 15th Guards Assault Aviation Regiment	
Vasily Ilyich Mykhlik; Василий Ильич Мыхлик	23 February 1945; 29 June 1945	Navigator of the 566th Assault Aviation Regiment Squadron commander in the 566th Assault Aviation Regiment	
Anatoly Konstantinovich Nedbaylo; Анатолий Константинович Недбайло	19 April 1945; 29 June 1945	Squadron commander in the 75th Guards Assault Aviation Regiment	
Andriyan Grigoryevich Nikolayev; Андриян Григорьевич Николаев	18 August 1962; 3 July 1970	Pilot of the Vostok 3 Commander of Soyuz 9	
Aleksandr Aleksandrovich Novikov; Александр Александрович Новиков	17 April 1945; 8 September 1945	Chief commander of the Soviet Air Forces	
Mikhail Petrovich Odintsov; Михаил Петрович Одинцов	4 February 1944; 27 June 1945	Squadron commander in the 820th Assault Aviation Regiment Deputy commander of the 155th Guards Assault Aviation Regiment	
Vasily Nikolayevich Osipov; Василий Николаевич Осипов	20 June 1942; 13 March 1944	Pilot in the 81st Bomber Aviation Regiment Deputy squadron commander in the 5th Guards Aviation Regiment	
Ivan Fomich Pavlov; Иван Фомич Павлов	4 February 1944; 23 February 1945	Flight commander in the 6th Guards Ground Assault Aviation Regiment Squadron commander in the 6th Guards Ground Assault Aviation Regiment	
Ivan Dmitrievich Papanin; Иван Дмитриевич Папанин	27 June 1937; 3 February 1940	Commander of North Pole-1 Chief of Glavsevmorput	
Georgy Mikhailovich Parshin; Георгий Михайлович Паршин	19 August 1944; 19 April 1945	Squadron commander in the 943rd Assault Aviation Regiment Commander of the 943rd Assault Aviation Regiment	
Vasily Stepanovich Petrov; Василий Степанович Петров	24 December 1943; 27 June 1945	Deputy commander of the 1850th Anti-tank Artillery Regiment Commander of the 248th Guards Anti-Tank Artillery Regiment	
Issa Aleksandrovich Pliyev; Исса Александрович Плиев	16 April 1944; 8 September 1945	Commander of the mechanized group of the 3rd Ukrainian Front Commander of the mechanized group of the Trans-Baikal Front	
Pavel Artemyevich Plotnikov; Павел Артемьевич Плотников	19 August 1944; 27 June 1945	Deputy squadron commander in the 82nd Guards Bomber Aviation Regiment Squadron commander in the 81st Guards Bomber Aviation Regiment	
Pyotr Afanasyevich Pokryshev; Пётр Афанасьевич Покрышев	10 February 1943; 24 August 1943	Squadron commander in the 154th Fighter Aviation Regiment Commander of the 159th Fighter Aviation Regiment	
Ivan Semyonovich Polbin; Иван Семёнович Полбин	23 November 1942; 6 April 1945	Commander of the 150th High-speed Bomber Aviation Regiment Commander of the 6th Guards Bomber Aviation Corps	
Vitaly Ivanovich Popkov; Виталий Иванович Попков	8 September 1943; 27 June 1945	Flight commander in the 5th Guards Fighter Aviation Regiment Squadron commander in the 5th Guards Fighter Aviation Regiment	
Leonid Ivanovich Popov; Леонид Иванович Попов	11 October 1980; 22 May 1981	Commander of Soyuz 35, Soyuz 37, and Salyut 6 Commander of Soyuz 40, Soyuz T-4, and Salyut 6	
Pavel Romanovich Popovich; Павел Романович Попович	18 August 1962; 20 July 1974	Pilot of Vostok 4 Commander of Soyuz 14 and Salyut 3	
Aleksey Nikolayevich Prokhorov; Алексей Николаевич Прохоров	19 April 1945; 29 June 1945	Flight commander in the 15th Guards Assault Aviation Regiment Squadron commander in the 15th Guards Assault Aviation Regiment	
Vasily Ivanovich Rakov; Василий Иванович Раков	7 February 1940; 22 July 1944	Squadron commander in the 57th Bomber Aviation Regiment Commander of the 12th Guards Dive Bomber Aviation Regiment	
Grigory Andreyevich Rechkalov; Григорий Андреевич Речкалов	24 May 1943; 1 July 1944	Flight commander in the 16th Guards Fighter Aviation Regiment Deputy commander of the 16th Guards Fighter Aviation Regiment	
Aleksandr Ilyich Rodimtsev; Александр Ильич Родимцев	22 October 1937; 22 June 1945	Military advisor to the Spanish Republican Army Commander of the 32nd Guards Rifle Corps	
Konstantin Konstantinovich Rokossovsky; Константин Константинович Рокоссовский	29 July 1944; 1 June 1945	Commander of the 1st Belorussian Front Commander of the 2nd Belorussian Front	
Yuri Viktorovich Romanenko; Юрий Викторович Романенко	16 March 1978; 26 September 1980	Commander of Soyuz 26, Soyuz 27, Soyuz 28, and Salyut 6 Commander of Soyuz 37, Soyuz 38, and Salyut 6	
Nikolai Nikolayevich Rukavishnikov; Николай Николаевич Рукавишников	30 April 1971; 11 December 1974	Test engineer of Soyuz 10 and Salyut Flight engineer of Soyuz 16	
Pavel Semyonovich Rybalko; Павел Семёнович Рыбалко	17 November 1943; 6 April 1945	Commander of the 3rd Guards Tank Army	
Valery Victorovich Ryumin; Валерий Викторович Рюмин	19 August 1979; 11 October 1980	Flight engineer of Soyuz 32 and Salyut 6 Flight engineer of Soyuz 35 and Salyut 6	
Aleksey Konstantinovich Ryazanov; Алексей Константинович Рязанов	24 August 1943; 18 August 1945	Squadron commander in the 4th Fighter Aviation Regiment Deputy commander of the 4th Fighter Aviation Regiment	
Vasily Georgievich Ryazanov; Василий Георгиевич Рязанов	22 February 1944; 2 June 1945	Commander of the 1st Assault Aviation Corps Commander of the 1st Guards Assault Aviation Corps	
Viktor Petrovich Savinykh; Виктор Петрович Савиных	26 May 1981; 20 December 1985	Flight engineer of Soyuz T-4 and Salyut 6 Flight engineer of Soyuz T-13 and Salyut 7	
Svetlana Yevgenyevna Savitskaya; Светлана Евгеньевна Савицкая	27 August 1982; 29 July 1984	Researcher onboard Soyuz T-7 and Salyut 7 Flight engineer of Soyuz T-12	
Yevgeny Yakovlevich Savitsky; Евгений Яковлевич Савицкий	11 May 1944; 2 June 1945	Commander of the 3rd Fighter Aviation Corps	
Boris Feoktistovich Safonov; Борис Феоктистович Сафонов	16 September 1941; 14 June 1942	Squadron commander in the 72nd Mixed Aviation Regiment Commander of the 2nd Guards Mixed Aviation Regiment	
Vitaly Ivanovich Sevastyanov; Виталий Иванович Севастьянов	3 July 1970; 27 July 1975	Flight engineer of Soyuz 9 Flight engineer of Soyuz 18 and Salyut 4	
Nikolai Illarionovich Semeyko; Николай Илларионович Семейко	19 April 1945; 29 June 1945	Squadron navigator in the 75th Guards Assault Aviation Regiment Navigator of the 75th Guards Assault Aviation Regiment	
Vasily Vasilyevich Senko; Василий Васильевич Сенько	25 March 1943; 29 June 1945	Navigator of the 752nd Long-range Aviation Regiment Navigator of the 10th Guards Long-range Aviation Regiment	
Grigory Flegontovich Sivkov; Григорий Флегонтович Сивков	4 February 1944; 18 August 1945	Squadron commander in the 210th Assault Aviation Regiment Navigator of the 210th Assault Aviation Regiment	
Nikolai Mikhailovich Skomorokhov; Николай Михайлович Скоморохов	23 February 1945; 18 August 1945	Squadron commander in the 31st Fighter Aviation Regiment	
Zakhar Karpovoich Slyusarenko; Захар Карпович Слюсаренко	23 September 1944; 31 May 1945	Commander of the 56th Guards Tank Brigade	
Aleksey Semyonovich Smirnov; Алексей Семёнович Смирнов	28 September 1943; 23 February 1945	Deputy squadron commander in the 28th Guards Fighter Aviation Regiment Squadron commander in the 28th Guards Fighter Aviation Regiment	
Yakov Vladimirovich Smushkevich; Яков Владимирович Смушкевич	21 June 1937; 17 November 1939	Senior Military Advisor for Aviation for the Spanish Republican Army Commander of an aviation unit of the 1st Army	
Vladimir Alekseyevich Solovyov; Владимир Алексеевич Соловьёв	2 October 1982; 16 July 1986	Flight engineer of Soyuz T-10 and Salyut 7 Flight engineer of Soyuz T-15, Salyut 7, and Mir	
Ivan Nikiforovich Stepanenko; Иван Никифорович Степаненко	13 April 1944; 18 August 1945	Deputy squadron commander in the 4th Fighter Aviation Regiment Squadron commander in the 4th Fighter Aviation Regiment	
Mikhail Tikhonovich Stepanishchev; Михаил Тихонович Степанищев	26 October 1944; 29 June 1945	Navigator of the 76th Guards Assault Aviation Regiment Deputy Commander of the 76th Guards Assault Aviation Regiment	
Nelson Georgievich Stepanyan; Նելսոն Գևորգի Ստեփանյան	23 October 1942; 6 March 1945	Flight commander in the 57th Assault Aviation Regiment Commander of the 47th Assault Aviation Regiment	
Nikolai Georgievich Stolyarov; Николай Георгиевич Столяров	1 July 1944; 27 June 1945	Flight commander in the 667th Assault Aviation Regiment Navigator of the 141st Guards Assault Aviation Regiment	
Gennady Mikhailovich Strekalov; Геннадий Михайлович Стрекалов	10 December 1980; 11 April 1984	Research engineer of Soyuz T-3 and Salyut 6 Flight engineer of Soyuz T-10, Soyuz T-11, and Salyut 7	
Stepan Pavlovich Suprun; Степан Павлович Супрун	20 May 1940; 22 July 1941	Commander of a fighter aviation unit Commander of the 401st Fighter Aviation Regiment	
Pavel Andreyevich Taran; Павел Андреевич Таран	20 June 1942; 13 March 1944	Flight commander in the 81st Long-range Aviation Regiment Squadron commander in the 5th Guards Long-range Aviation Regiment	
Semyon Konstantinovich Timoshenko; Семён Константинович Тимошенко	21 March 1940; 18 February 1945	Commander of the North-Western Front Marshal of the Soviet Union	
Aleksey Fyodorovich Fyodorov; Алексей Фёдорович Фёдоров	18 May 1942; 4 January 1944	Commander of the Chernigov-Volyn Partisan Formation	
Yevgeny Petrovich Fyodorov; Евгений Петрович Фёдоров	7 April 1940; 29 June 1945	Squadron commander in the 6th Long-range Bomber Aviation Regiment Deputy commander of the 2nd Guards Aviation Division	
Ivan Ivanovich Fesin; Иван Иванович Фесин	1 March 1943; 1 November 1943	Commander of the 13th motorized rifle brigade Commander of the 236th Infantry Division	
Anatoly Vasilyevich Filipchenko; Анатолий Васильевич Филипченко	22 October 1969; 11 December 1974	Commander of Soyuz 7 Commander of Soyuz 16	
Mikhail Georgievich Fomichyov; Михаил Георгиевич Фомичёв	23 September 1944; 31 May 1945	Commander of the 63rd Guards Tank Brigade	
Semyon Vasilyevich Khokhryakov; Семён Васильевич Хохряков	24 May 1944; 10 April 1945	Commander of a tank battalion in the 54th Guards Tank Brigade	
Timofey Timofeyevich Khryukin; Тимофей Тимофеевич Хрюкин	22 February 1939; 19 April 1945	Commander of an aviation group Commander of the 1st Air Army	
Nikolai Vasilyevich Chelnokov; Николай Васильевич Челноков	14 June 1942; 19 August 1944	Squadron commander in the 57th Assault Aviation Regiment Commander of the 8th Guards Assault Aviation Regiment	
Ivan Danilovich Chernyakhovsky; Иван Данилович Черняховский	17 October 1943; 29 July 1944	Commander of the 60th Army Commander of the 3rd Belorussian Front	
Vasily Ivanovich Chuikov; Василий Иванович Чуйков	19 March 1944; 6 April 1945	Commander of the 62nd Army Commander of the 8th Guards Army	
Aleksandr Osipovich Shabalin; Александр Осипович Шабалин	22 February 1944; 5 November 1944	Commander of a torpedo boat in the Northern Fleet Commander of a detachment of torpedo boats in the Northern Fleet	
Vladimir Aleksandrovich Shatalov; Владимир Александрович Шаталов	22 January 1969; 22 October 1969	Commander of Soyuz 4 Commander of Soyuz 8	
Afanasy Petrovich Shilin; Афанасий Петрович Шилин	22 February 1944; 24 March 1945	Platoon commander in the 132nd Guards Artillery Regiment Chief of the Intelligence Division of the 132nd Guards Artillery Regiment	
Pavel Ivanovich Shurukhin; Павел Иванович Шурухин	23 October 1943; 24 March 1945	Commander of the 132nd Guards Rifle Regiment	
Stepan Fyodorovich Shutov; Степан Фёдорович Шутов	10 January 1944; 13 September 1944	Commander of the 20th Guards Tank Brigade	
Ivan Ignatyevich Yakubovsky; Иван Игнатьевич Якубовский	10 January 1944; 23 September 1944	Commander of the 91st Separate Tank Brigade Deputy Commander of the 6th Guards Tank Corps	

== See also ==
- Hero of the Soviet Union

== Bibliography ==
- Shkadov, Ivan (1987). Герои Советского Союза: краткий биографический словарь I, Абаев - Любичев [Heroes of the Soviet Union: A Brief Biographical Dictionary I, Abaev - Lyubichev]. Moscow: Voenizdat. OCLC 313747315.
- Shkadov, Ivan (1988). Герои Советского Союза: краткий биографический словарь II, Любовь - Яшчук [Heroes of the Soviet Union: A Brief Biographical Dictionary II, Lyubov - Yashchuk]. Moscow: Voenizdat. ISBN 978-5-203-00536-6. OCLC 247400113.
- Vukolov, Viktor (1973). Дважды Герои Советского Союза (in Russian). Moscow: Voenizdat.
