= General Kravchenko =

General Kravchenko may refer to:

- Andrey Kravchenko (general) (1899–1963), Soviet Army colonel general
- Grigory Kravchenko (1912–1943), Soviet Air Force lieutenant general
- Yuriy Kravchenko (1951–2005), Ukrainian General of Internal Service
