= Ivan Pavlov (disambiguation) =

Ivan Pavlov (1849–1936) was a Russian physiologist.

Ivan Pavlov may also refer to:

- Ivan Pavlov (aviator) (1922–1950), twice hero of the Soviet Union
- Ivan Pavlov (footballer) (born 1983), Bulgarian football player
- Ivan Pavlov (figure skater) (born 1998), Ukrainian figure skater
- Ivan Pavlov (lawyer) (born 1971), Russian lawyer
- Ivan Pavlov (film), a 1949 Soviet film
- CoH (musician), alias of Russian-born musician Ivan Pavlov
