= Nikolai Semeyko =

Soviet Il-2 pilot (1923–1945)

Nikolai Illarionovich Semeyko
- Николай Илларионович Семейко
- Born: 25 March 1923; Sloviansk, Donets Governorate, Ukrainian SSR, USSR
- Died: 20 April 1945 (aged 22); East Prussia, Nazi Germany (present-day Kaliningrad Oblast)
- Military career
- Allegiance: Soviet Union
- Branch: Soviet Air Force
- Service years: 1940 – 1945
- Rank: Captain
- Unit: 75th Guards Attack Aviation Regiment
- Conflicts: World War II
- Awards: Hero of the Soviet Union (twice)

Nikolai Illarionovich Semeyko (Russian: Николай Илларионович Семейко, Ukrainian: Микола Іларіонович Семейко; 25 March 1923 – 20 April 1945) was a Soviet Il-2 pilot and navigator during World War II who was twice awarded the title Hero of the Soviet Union.

== Early life ==
Semeyko was born on 25 March 1923 to a working-class Ukrainian family in Sloviansk. He completed nine grades of school and graduated from an aeroclub before entering the military in August 1940. There he trained in aviation, and in February 1943 he graduated from the Voroshilovgrad Military Aviation School of pilots, which was based in Kazakhstan away from the front of the war. He became a member of the Communist Party in 1943.

== In combat ==
Upon arriving at the warfront in March 1943 as a pilot in the 505th Attack Aviation Regiment on the Southern Front, he began flying combat sorties on the Il-2. Later that same month the unit was honored with the guards designation and renamed to the 75th Guards Attack Aviation Regiment. During a mission in November he was badly injured during a flight after being attacked by two Bf 109s, but despite getting blood in his eyes he went on the target before returning.

Despite having arrived in the regiment as a just an enlisted pilot, he quickly rose through the ranks, becoming promoted to captain in January 1945 in addition to moving up the chain of command to flight commander, deputy squadron commander, squadron commander, and eventually regimental navigator. On the day after he was declared a Hero of the Soviet Union for the first time, he was killed in action during a mission after being shot down by anti-aircraft fire from the ground. His colleagues, including Anatoly Nedbaylo, avenged him by targeting the anti-aircraft gun that shot him down, heavily opening fire on it. At the time of his death he had already been nominated for a second gold star, since he had been nominated for it on 16 April. During his life he was nominated for the title three times: the first time in April 1944 which was not successful, again in October 1944 for 144 sorties which was awarded on 19 April 1945, and on 16 April 1945 for flying 227 sorties, which was awarded posthumously. In total he flew 228 combat sorties on the Il-2, targeting a variety of enemy equipment which included damaging or destroying 17 tanks, a train, 12 aircraft on the ground, and 32 cars. He never had the opportunity to wear the gold star medal since he died before the first gold star medal was given to him.

== Awards ==
- Twice Hero of the Soviet Union (19 April 1945 and 29 June 1945)
- Order of Lenin (19 April 1945)
- Three Order of the Red Banner (30 August 1943, 1 November 1943, and 24 October 1944)
- Order of Bogdan Khmelnitsky (23 April 1945)
- Order of Alexander Nevsky (3 July 1944)
- Order of the Patriotic War 1st class (23 February 1944)

== See also ==
- List of twice Heroes of the Soviet Union
