= Nedbaylo =

Nedbaylo or Nedbailo (Недбайло) is a Ukrainian-language surname. It may refer to:

- Anatoly Nedbaylo (1923–2008), Soviet World War II pilot, twice Hero of the Soviet Union
- Tatiana Nedbaylo, Kyrgyz gymnast
- Petr Emelyanovich Nedbailo (1907–1974), a 1968 recipient of the United Nations Prize in the Field of Human Rights
