= Vasily Zaitsev =

Vasily Zaitsev may refer to:

- Vasily Zaitsev (pilot) (1910–1961), Soviet World War II flying ace
- Vasily Zaitsev (sniper) (1915–1991), Soviet World War II sniper
