= Kostanay District =

Coordinates: 53°12′36″N 63°37′12″E

Kostanay
- District
- Қостанай ауданы
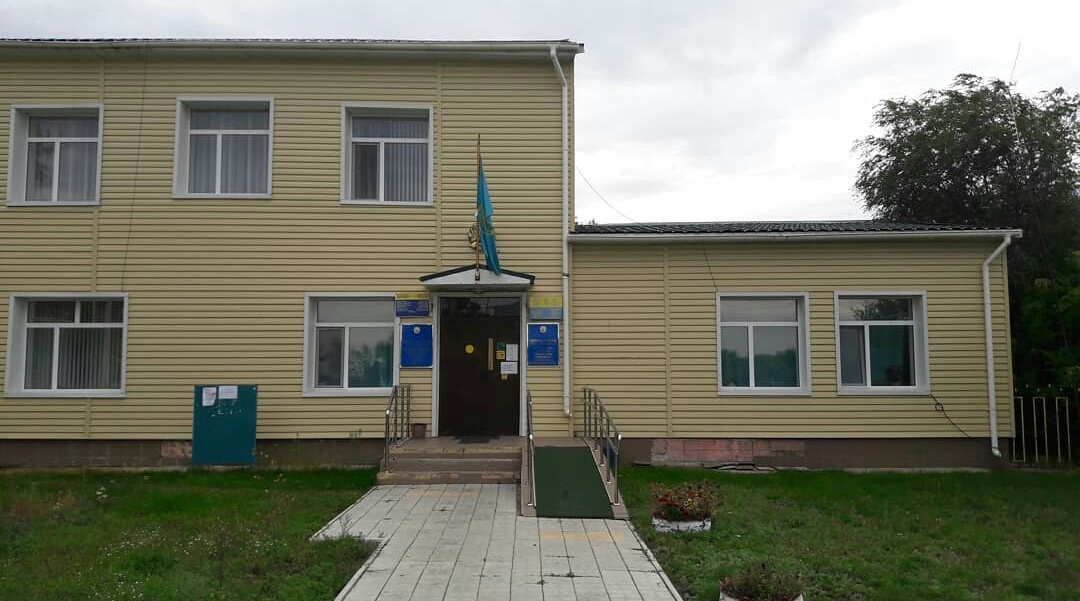
- Administrative building of Sadchikovka village, Kostanay District

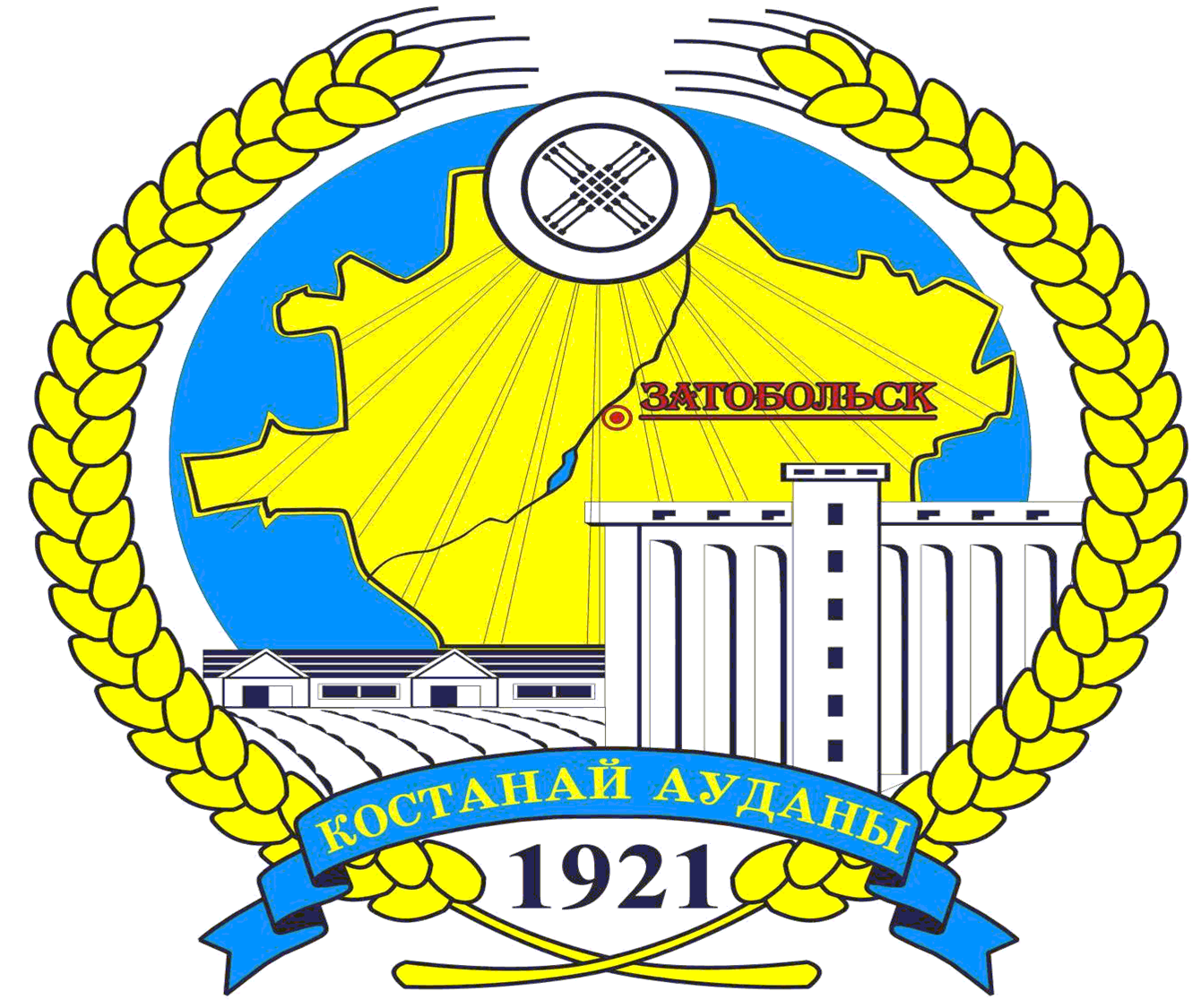
- Seal

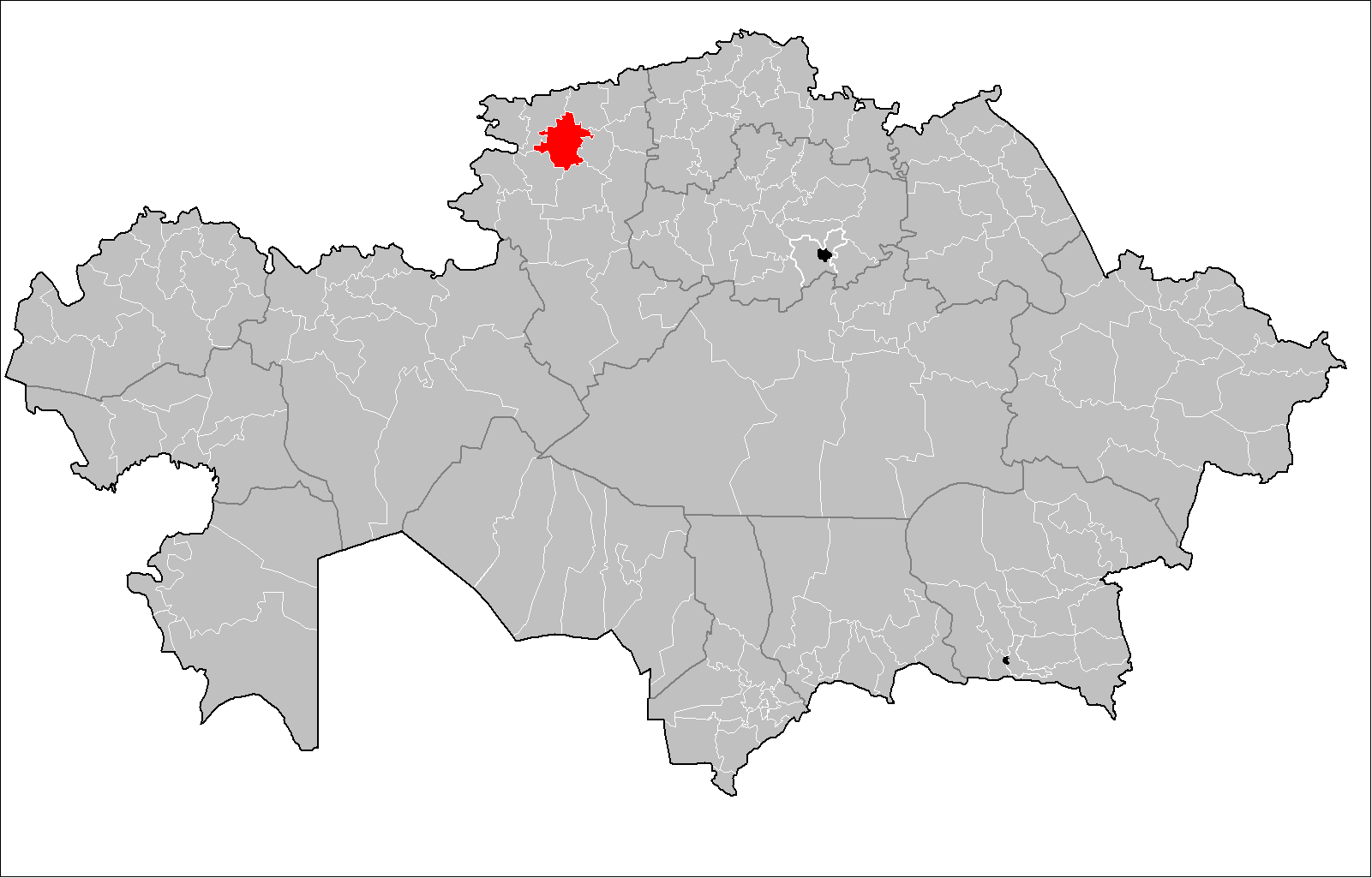
- Country: Kazakhstan
- Region: Kostanay Region
- Administrative center: Tobyl

Government
  - Akim: Olzhas Nurgaliyev

Population (2013)
  - Total: 68,914
- Time zone: UTC+5 (East)

Kostanay (Kazakh: Қостанай ауданы, Qostanai audany) is a district of Kostanay Region in eastern Kazakhstan. The administrative center of the district is the urban-type settlement of Tobyl. Population: 68,914 (2013 estimate); 67,512 (2009 census results); 65,435 (1999 census results).

== Notable residents ==
- Aleksandra Klimova (1921–2005), actress
- Ivan Pavlov (1922–1950), aviator
