= Afanasy Shilin =

Soviet artilery officer (1924–1982)

Afanasy Petrovich Shilin
- Афанасий Петрович Шилин
- Born: 1 September 1924; Petropavlivka, Saratov Governorate, RSFSR, USSR
- Died: 22 May 1982 (aged 57); Moscow, USSR
- Military career
- Allegiance: Soviet Union
- Branch: Red Army
- Service years: 1942–1982
- Rank: Lieutenant general
- Conflicts: World War II
- Awards: Hero of the Soviet Union (twice)

Afanasy Petrovich Shilin (Russian: Афанасий Петрович Шилин; 1 September 1924 – 22 May 1982) was an artillery officer who was twice awarded the title Hero of the Soviet Union for actions in the Battle of the Dnieper and the Vistula-Oder Offensive.

== Early life ==
Born on 1 September 1924 to a working-class family, after graduating from high school he worked at a mine in Leninsk-Kuznetsky. When Nazi Germany invaded the Soviet Union in June 1941 he requested to join the military, but was initially rejected for being too young.

== World War II ==
Upon being drafted into the Red Army in 1942, he attended the 2nd Tomsk Artillery School, which he graduated from in 1943 at the age of 19. Upon arrival at the Southwestern front in June 1943 as a lieutenant and platoon commander in the 132nd Guards Artillery Regiment of the 60th Guards Rifle Division he participated in battles to expel the axis from Soviet territories. He crossed the Dnieper on the night of 27 October 1943 to establish a bridgehead on Khortytsia, killing seven enemy soldiers in a trench with hands grenades and machine-gun fire. When the counterattack began at dawn he was put under heavy artillery fire that eventually took out his radio, but he made a trip across the river to fetch a new one. Over the course of a day the position was attacked by enemy bombers and attacked 13 times, and Shilin took fire on himself, but they were able to hold the bridgehead until reinforcements arrived. For his role in the Battle of the Dnieper he was awarded the title Hero of the Soviet Union on 22 February 1944.

Later he was promoted to the position of intelligence chief in the regiment; in that position, he was recognized for his bravery in the Vistula-Oder Offensive. He was withdrawn from combat during the battle for the Magnushevskom bridgehead after he was badly wounded in the chest after throwing grenades into an embrasure 15 January 1945. For the remainder of the war he was hospitalized, but he was awarded the title Hero of the Soviet Union again on 24 March 1945.

== Postwar ==
After the war he remained in the military, graduating from the Higher School of Artillery Officers in 1946, the Dzershinsky Academy in 1952, and the Military Academy of General Staff in 1966. He was promoted to the rank lieutenant-general in 1975. During his career he commanded a missile brigade, the 10th Guards Missile Division, was deputy commander of the 27th Guards Missile Army, and became the deputy chairman of the central committee of the DOSAAF in 1976. Shilin died on 22 May 1982 and was buried in the Kuntsevo cemetery.

== Awards ==
- Twice Hero of the Soviet Union (1944 and 1945)
- Order of Lenin (1944)
- Order of the Red Banner (1943)
- Order of the Patriotic War 2nd class (1943)
- Order of the Red Banner of Labour (1969)
- Order "For Service to the Homeland in the Armed Forces of the USSR" 3rd class (1977)
- campaign and jubilee medals

== See also ==
- List of twice Heroes of the Soviet Union
