= Nikolai Chelnokov =

Assault aviation pilot

Nikolai Vasilyevich Chelnokov
- Николай Васильевич Челноков
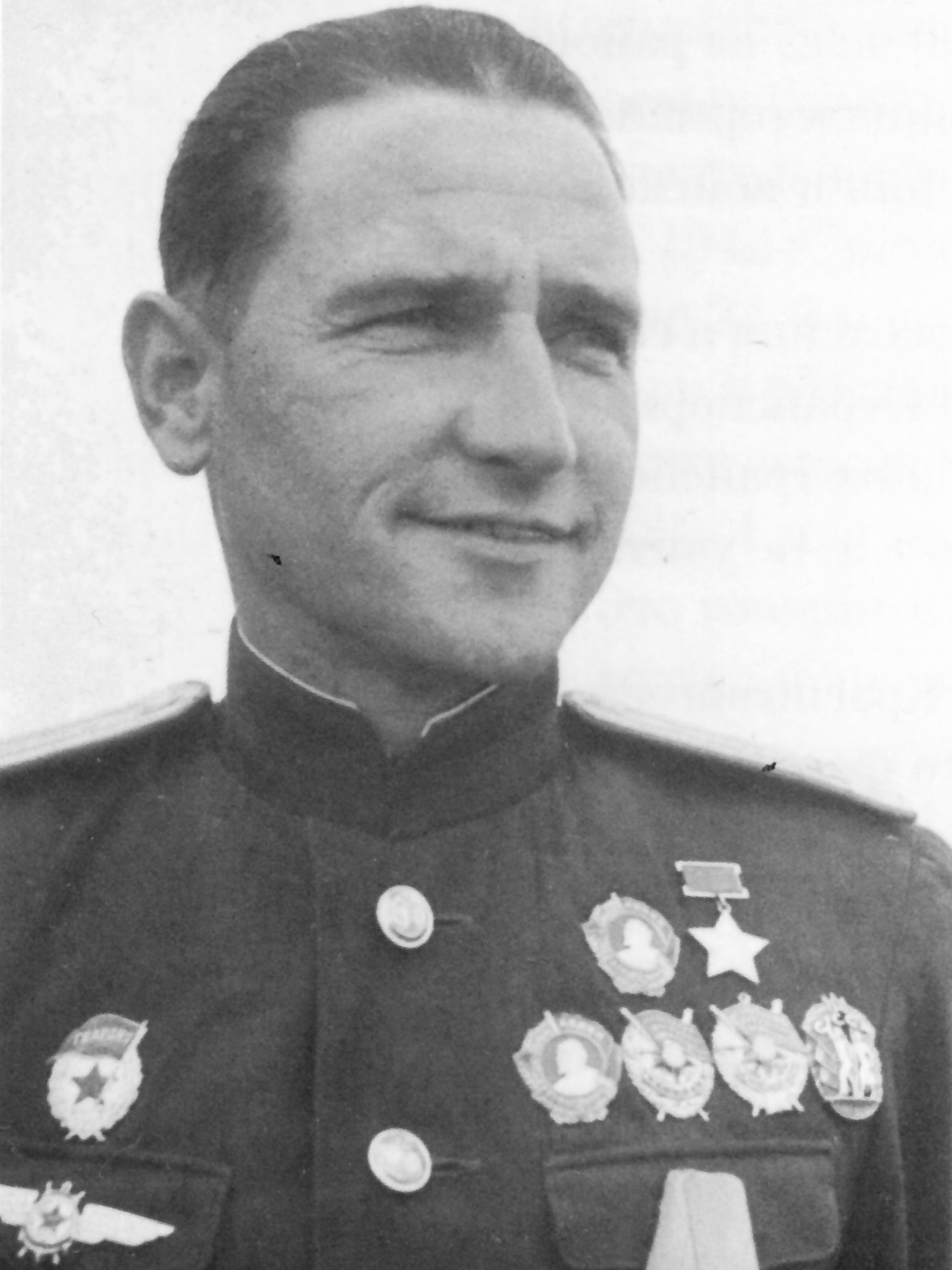
- Born: 9 May [O.S. 26 April] 1906; Irkutsk, Russian Empire
- Died: 16 July 1974 (aged 68); Moscow, USSR
- Military career
- Allegiance: Soviet Union
- Branch: Naval Aviation
- Service years: 1931 – 1954
- Rank: General-major of Aviation
- Conflicts: World War II; Winter War; Eastern Front
- Awards: Hero of the Soviet Union (twice)

Nikolai Vasilyevich Chelnokov (Russian: Никола́й Васи́льевич Челноко́в; 9 May [O.S. 26 April] 1906 – 16 July 1974) was an assault aviation pilot in the Soviet Navy who was twice awarded the title Hero of the Soviet Union during World War II. He joined the Soviet Armed Forces in 1928 and within a few years became a Soviet Navy pilot and flight instructor. During World War II he received promotion to squadron and then regimental commander. After the war he became a major general before retiring from the military in 1954.

== Early life ==
Chelnokov was born on 9 May [O.S. 26 April] 1906 in Irkutsk to a working-class Russian family. Two years later his family moved to the village of Glebovo just outside Saint Petersburg, which they had left in 1905 before he was born, residing there until 1926. That year Chelnokov graduated from his ninth grade of school in Kashin before starting to work as a manual laborer in Leningrad. In 1928 he began studying at the Leningrad Electrotechnical Institute, but left it shortly thereafter upon volunteering to join the military in December.

== Military career ==
Less than a year after entering the military he graduated from the Leningrad Military Theoretical Air Force School in November 1929. He then went on to graduate from the Borisoglebsk Military Aviation School of Pilots a year later, and then the Sevastopol Military Aviation School of Naval Pilots in May 1931, after which he was sent to the Yeysk Military Aviation School as a flight instructor. There he became promoted to flight commander and piloted the Po-2, Sh-2, MBR-2, R-6, and S-68. In 1938 he was reassigned to the 1st Mine-Torpedo Aviation Regiment; there he flew the notorious Ilyushin DB-3. During the Winter War he flew with the unit as a junior pilot and later flight commander, making 40 sorties on the DB-3 and surviving several close calls with death after facing mechanical failure in the freezing weather. During a mission in January 1940 he was forced to make an emergency landing on ice in the Gulf of Finland. The aircraft was put back into service after undergoing maintenance, but on the first takeoff after the repairs he was again plagued by engine troubles. After the end of the war with Finland he continued to pilot the DB-3 as a flight commander in his unit, and before the German invasion of the Soviet Union he became a squadron commander.

=== World War II ===
During the first two months of Operation Barbarossa, Chelnokov flew in defensive missions in the Baltic, commanding his squadron of DB-3s; he made his first sortie on 24 June and flew his last mission of the DB-3 in late July. During that time the participated in the bombing of a German naval base and on multiple occasions flew without fighter escorts, resulting in intense clashes with enemy aircraft that resulted in heavy losses, which were worsened by fuel shortages. After the initial blow the regiment was withdrawn from the front to Voronezh to retrain on the Ilyushin Il-2. Being one of the first pilots to master the new plane, he was kept away from the front to train other naval pilots. In August was part of a flight to ferry ten of the new planes to the Black Sea Fleet, and later that month he returned to the Baltic fleet with a group of new Il-2s. From then until April 1942 he was a squadron commander in the 57th Assault Aviation Regiment, during which he flew in the Siege of Leningrad and was nominated for the title Hero of the Soviet Union on 28 December 1941 for accumulating 58 sorties on the Il-2; however, the title was not awarded until 14 June 1942. In April 1942 he was made deputy commander of the 1st Mine-torpedo Aviation Regiment, and in August he was promoted to regimental commander.

On 2 May 1943, the master-of-armament was killed in an accidental explosion while trying to remove bombs from an old DB-3; the explosion also badly damaged several Yak fighters in addition to destroying two DB-3s. He was put under tribunal along with two other engineers from his regiment; he was given a demotion to major, removed from command of the regiment, and a suspended sentence of five years that he was supposed to serve upon the end of the war. However, in April 1944 a tribunal decided he would not have to serve the sentence. In June 1943 he took on the role of assistant commander for flight training in the 8th Guards Assault Aviation Regiment. Shortly thereafter in August he was made squadron commander in the 47th Assault Aviation Regiment. During a mission on 18 August 1943 he led his squadron in a sortie over Anapa that resulted in the destruction of 11 enemy aircraft. In October he became a flight inspector in the 11th Assault Aviation Division. In December he returned to the 8th Guards Regiment as commander, where he remained until August 1944. Despite his high position he continued to fly in combat; on 11 March 1944 he led a formation of 19 Il-2s in an attack on Axis naval vessels in Feodosia, resulting in the destruction of transport, patrol, and torpedo boats. From January to April 1944 the aviators under his command sank 15 ships and damaged 37 more. In August that year he was nominated to receive a second gold star for flying 277 sorties. That month, he was promoted to commander of the 9th Assault Aviation Division, but he left command of it in November, before he graduated from the Leningrad Naval Academy in 1945.

=== Postwar ===
After graduating from the Naval Academy in 1945 he commanded the 9th Assault Aviation Division, which he remained in command of until December 1947. From 1946 to 1950 he was a member of the Supreme Soviet. In May 1949 he was promoted to the rank of major-general, After graduating from the Military Academy of General Staff in December that year he was made assistant commander of the air force of the 4th Navy. In 1950 he became inspector-general of air defense; from 1951 to 1953 he was a senior aviation inspector for the navy, and in July 1953 he became the main navigator of the navy. From March 1954 until his retirement from the military a month later he headed the department of navigation services.

== Later life ==
After retiring in 1954 lived in Moscow; from 1954 to 1955 he was the deputy head of the department of air and water transportation in the Ministry of Trade. He died on 16 July 1974 and was buried in the Golovinsky cemetery.

== Awards ==
- Twice Hero of the Soviet Union (14 June 1942 and 19 August 1944)
- Three Order of Lenin (29 November 1914, 14 June 1942, and 5 November 1954)
- Four Order of the Red Banner (21 April 1940, 30 April 1944, 30 June 1944, and 20 June 1949)
- Order of Ushakov 2nd class (10 August 1945)
- Order of the Red Star (3 November 1944)
- Order of the Badge of Honour (25 May 1936)
- campaign and jubilee medals

== See also ==
- List of twice Heroes of the Soviet Union
