= Pavel Shurukhin =

Russian partisan and general

Pavel Ivanovich Shurukhin
- Павел Иванович Шурухин
- Born: 18 November [O.S. 5 November] 1912; Solyano Yerik, Samara Governorate, Russian Empire (located within present-day Novonikolskoe village, Volgograd Oblast)
- Died: 3 November 1956 (aged 43); Moscow, USSR
- Spouse: Kapitolina Fedoseevna
- Military career
- Allegiance: Soviet Union
- Branch: Red Army
- Rank: General-major
- Conflicts: World War II; Winter War; Eastern Front
- Awards: Hero of the Soviet Union (twice)

Pavel Ivanovich Shurukhin (Russian: Павел Иванович Шурухин; 18 November [O.S. 5 November] 1912 – 3 November 1956) was an army officer and partisan with NKVD ties who was twice awarded the title Hero of the Soviet Union during World War II. After the war he became a general, but died just three years later.

== Civilian life ==
Born on 18 November [O.S. 5 November] 1912 to a Russian peasant family in what is now Novonikolskoe village of Volgograd Oblast, he was forced to begin working at a young age due to the deaths of his parents. After completing his education at a rural secondary school he entered the military.

== Military career ==
Having been drafted into the Red Army in 1931, he soon went on to graduate from a military academy in 1934 and was made a platoon commander. He quickly rose up through the ranks, becoming an assistant company commander and then chief of regimental training; during the Winter War with Finland he commanded a ski battalion.

During the initial stage of Operation Barbarossa he was posted as commander of a training battalion within the 6th Motor-rifle Regiment, based in the Moscow Military District. The unit was soon posted to the Western Front where they saw combat in late June. The next month his unit became encircled by enemy forces, so in August he became leader of a partisan unit in Gomel after multiple failed attempts to get out of the encirclement. While encircled he was badly injured, but rescued by a Belarusian woman who hid him in her house and gave him first aid. While caring for him she helped him make contact with local Communist sympathizers to form a partisan unit in addition to the other soldiers from his battalion. Eventually his partisan unit made contact with other Soviet units and became subordinate to the NKVD in February 1942. In spring that year he became deputy commander of the 20th Motor-rifle Regiment of the NKVD, but was soon transferred by the NKVD to command the joint guerrilla army in Orel. It was not until August 1943 that he returned to the Red Army, after heading the Bryansk partisan regional headquarters task force.

Upon his return to the army he commanded the 132nd Guards Rifle Regiment; during his tenure the unit fought on the Western, Voronezh, and 1st Ukrainian fronts, participating in offensive operations that resulted in the expulsion of enemy forces from many areas, including a bridgehead of the Dnieper which they crossed on 24 September 1943. For success in the river crossing Shurukhin was awarded his first gold star on 23 October. After the advance over the Dnieper his unit saw success in the offensives for Iași, Bucharest, and the Carpathians; from August to September 1944 the regiment was credited with advancing 250 kilometres (160 miles), capturing 25 populated areas, killing up to 3000 combatants, and taking up to 1,500 prisoners. In later 1944 he was promoted to commander of the 42nd Guards Rifle Division, but shortly afterwards he was badly wounded when his car drove over a land mine. Despite the injuries, he eventually returned to active duty. For the offensive in the Carpathians he was awarded the title of hero again on 24 March 1945.

After the end of the war he remained in the military in addition to serving as a deputy of the Supreme Soviet of the Soviet Union from 1946 to 1950; after graduating from courses for infantry commanders he commanded a regiment, then a division. He was promoted to the rank general-major in 1953, but died in Moscow on 3 November 1956 of a serious illness and was buried in the Novodevichy Cemetery.

== Awards ==
- Twice Hero of the Soviet Union
- Two Order of Lenin
- Two Order of the Red Banner
- Two Order of the Red Star

== See also ==
- List of twice Heroes of the Soviet Union
