= Aleksandra Klimova =

Soviet actress (1921–2005)

- Аляксандра Клімава
- Born: 1 October 1921; Zatobolsk, Kazakh SSR, Soviet Union (present-day Tobyl, Kazakhstan)
- Died: 13 May 2005 (aged 83); Minsk, Belarus
- Occupations: Actress; teacher

Aleksandra Ivanovna Klimova (Note: Belarusian: Аляксандра Іванаўна Клімава, romanized: Alyaksandra Ivanawna Klimava; Russian: Александра Ивановна Климова, romanized: Aleksandra Ivanovna Klimova) (1 October 1921 – 13 May 2005) was a stage and film actress and pedagogue.

Klimova was born in Zatobolsk in what was then the Kirghiz Autonomous Socialist Soviet Republic and now Kostanay District of the Kostanay Region of Kazakhstan. From 1942 until 1945, she worked at the Magnitogorsk Theatre and in 1949 she attended M.S. Shchepkina Theatre School while working in Odesa. From 1953 to 1956 she worked in the Kharkiv Russian Theatre after which she joined the Maxim Gorky National Academic Drama Theatre in Minsk after moving to the Byelorussian SSR, now Belarus. In 1959, she was awarded the Honored Artist of the Byelorussian SSR, followed by the People's Artist of the Byelorussian SSR in 1963 and People's Artist of the USSR in 1969 for her accomplishments in acting at that theatre.

From 1981 until 1988, she taught at the Belarusian State Theater and Art Institute. She sat on numerous committees, including the Soviet Peace Committee, the Commission on Lenin and State Prizes under the Council of Ministers of the Soviet Union, the BSSR Commission for UNESCO, and the Board of the Belarusian Union of Theatre Workers, which she headed. She died in Minsk in May 2005 and is buried in its Eastern Cemetery. In 2007, a memorial plaque was unveiled commemorating her.
