= Leonid Beda =

Soviet Belarusian pilot

Leonid Ignatyevich Beda
- Леонид Игнатьевич Беда
- Born: 16 August 1920; Novopokrovka, Turgay Oblast, Russian SFSR
- Died: 26 December 1976 (aged 56); Brest Oblast, Byelorussian SSR, Soviet Union
- Military career
- Allegiance: Soviet Union
- Branch: Soviet Air Force
- Service years: 1940—1976
- Rank: Lieutenant General
- Units: 505th Assault Aviation Regiment (75th Guards Assault Aviation Regiment)
- Commands: 172nd Fighter-Bomber Aviation Division; 1st Guards Fighter-Bomber Aviation Division; 26th Air Army
- Awards: Hero of the Soviet Union (twice)

Leonid Ignatyevich Beda (Russian: Леони́д Игна́тьевич Беда́; 16 August 1920 – 26 December 1976) was a ground-attack squadron commander in the Soviet Air Forces during the Second World War who went on to become a Lieutenant-General of Aviation. He completed over 214 sorties on the Ilyushin Il-2 during the war, for which he was twice awarded the title Hero of the Soviet Union.

== Early life ==
Beda was born to a Ukrainian family in Novopokrovka village of the RSFSR, which is currently located in Kazakhstan. After completing his seventh grade of school in 1936 he attended an aeroclub and the Ural Pedagogical Institute, which he graduated from in 1940. That year he entered the Soviet military and was sent to the Chkalov Military School of Pilots.

== World War II ==
Beda graduated from the Chkalov Military School of Pilots in 1942, after which he was deployed to the warfront in August as a Sergeant. During a mission on 14 September 1942 he was wounded. Initially he served within the 568th Assault Aviation Regiment, but he was soon transferred to the 505th Assault Aviation Regiment, which was honored with the Guards designation and renamed the 75th Guards Assault Aviation Regiment in March 1943. That same month he was promoted to the rank of Senior Lieutenant, after having participated in the Battle of Stalingrad. At the start of the war Beda was a Sergeant, but he quickly rose through the ranks and by the end of the war he was a squadron commander with the rank of Major. In April 1944 he was awarded the title Hero of the Soviet Union for completing 144 sorties, and in June 1945 he was awarded the title again for the completion of 214 sorties.

== Postwar ==
After the end of the war in 1945 Beda attended the Lipetsk fighter-pilot school. He was then assigned to work in the Belarusian Military District until 1947. In 1950 he graduated from the Air Force Academy in Monino. He was then appointed as commander of an aviation regiment and then as deputy commander of an aviation division within the Turkestan Military District. In 1957 he graduated from the Academy of General Staff. He then commanded an aviation division in Grodno, Belarus. He was promoted to the rank of Major-general in 1960. In the 1960s he served as the deputy commander of the 26th Air Army. In February 1972 he was promoted to the rank of Lieutenant-General and made commander of the 26th Air Army. In addition to serving in military aviation, Beda served as a deputy in the Supreme Soviet of the Byelorussian SSR of the 5th and 9th convocations and became a member of the Central Committee of the Communist Party of Belarus in 1976. He died at the age of 56 in a car crash on 26 December 1976 in the Minsk area and was buried in the Vostochnoye Cemetery.

== Awards ==
- Hero of the Soviet Union (26 October 1944 and 29 June 1945)
- Order of Lenin (26 October 1944)
- Four Orders of the Red Banner (30 August 1943, 1 November 1943, 24 October 1944, 22 February 1968)
- Order of Alexander Nevsky (3 July 1944)
- Order of the Patriotic War 1st Class (19 April 1945)
- Order of the Red Star (10 December 1942)
- Medal "For Battle Merit" (15 November 1951)
- Honoured Military Pilot of the USSR (17 August 1971)

== See also ==
- List of twice Heroes of the Soviet Union
