= Aleksey Ryazanov (pilot) =

Soviet flying ace (1920–1992)

Aleksey Konstantinovich Ryazanov
- Алексей Константинович Рязанов
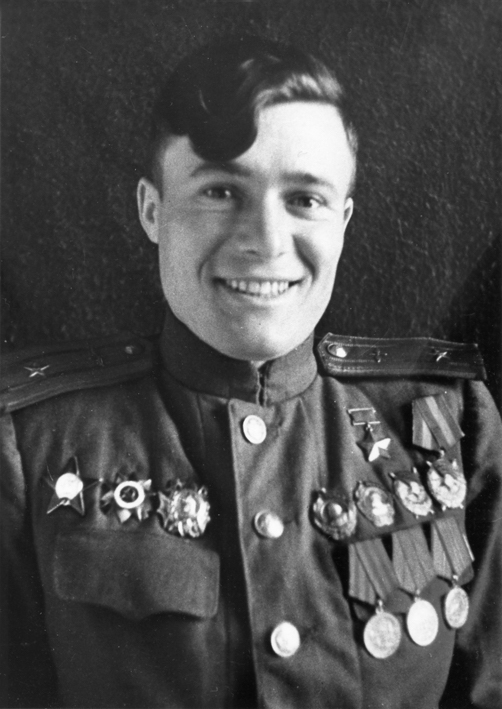
- Born: 27 February 1920; Kochetov, Tambov Governorate, RSFSR
- Died: 1 August 1992 (aged 72); Moscow, Russian Federation
- Military career
- Allegiance: Soviet Union
- Branch: Soviet Air Force
- Service years: 1939 – 1975
- Rank: General-Major of Aviation
- Unit: 4th Fighter Aviation Regiment
- Conflicts: World War II
- Awards: Hero of the Soviet Union (twice)

Aleksey Konstantinovich Ryazanov (Russian: Алексей Константинович Рязанов; 27 February 1920 – 1 August 1992) was a Soviet flying ace during world War II. With over 30 solo shootdowns of enemy aircraft, he remained in the military after the war and became a General-Major.

== Early life ==
Ryazanov was born on 27 February 1920 to a Russian family in Kochetov. After completing his seventh grade of school in 1936 he attended trade school. Having graduated from trade school and the Voronezh aeroclub in 1938, he was employed in the construction of the Moscow metro and later as a mechanic at a factory before entering the military in January 1939. After entering the military, Ryazanov graduated from the Borisoglebsk Military Aviation School of Pilots in November, after which he was assigned to the 162nd Reserve Aviation Regiment. In April 1940 he was transferred to the 89th Fighter Aviation Regiment, which flew the I-16. He became a member of the Communist party in 1942.

== World War II ==
Immediately upon the German invasion of the Soviet Union, Ryazanov experienced his baptism by fire. At the time a senior pilot, he gained his first aerial victory when he shot down a Hs 126 on 22 June 1941. Less than a week later he scored another shootdown, having shot down a He 111. In July he was transferred to the 28th Fighter Aviation Regiment, where he shot down two more enemy aircraft before he was badly injured in a dogfight on 7 August 1941. He was not released from the hospital until November; he then began flying in the 736th Fighter Aviation Regiment to defend the city of Moscow. He remained in the regiment until July 1942, after which he was transferred to the 4th Fighter Aviation Regiment as a squadron commander. There, he increased is shootdown count and often flew with Ivan Stepanenko. When most flying aces in the regiment were offered the opportunity to transfer to the prestigious 9th Guards Fighter Aviation Regiment, both Ryazanov and Stepanenko declined the opportunity but both later became twice Heroes of the Soviet Union. As a squadron commander he participated in the battles for Bryansk, Stalingrad, Kuban, Oryol, Vitebsk, Krasnodar, and other areas.

On 17 September 1942, Ryazanov shot down an Italian-made Macchi C.200. During the fighting for Kuban on 29 April 1943 after having shot down a Bf 109 went on to engage a group of six Do-217s; he managed to shoot one Do-217 down as well as another Bf 109 before he himself was shot down and forced to parachute out of his stricken Yak-9. He used his parachute again on 22 May 1943 after his plane was damaged from an aerial engagement that resulted in the downing of a Bf 109. Two days later he was nominated for the title Hero of the Soviet Union for having flown 360 sorties and personally shot down 16 enemy aircraft; he was awarded the title on 24 August 1943. While the nomination was pending he was injured during an aerial engagement on 20 July.

He was promoted to the position deputy commander of flight training in November 1944. During a flight over Latvia on 26 January 1945 he was seriously wounded when he was hit by a piece of an anti-aircraft shell. He fainted almost immediately after landing. Two days later he was nominated for the title Hero of the Soviet Union a second time for flying 509 sorties, personally shooting down 31 enemy aircraft, and gaining 12 shared kills; he received the title after the end of the war on 18 August 1945. He flew only two more missions after recovering before the war ended.

== Postwar ==
Ryazanov remained in his regiment until March 1946. The next month he graduated from the Lipetsk Higher Officer Flight Tactical School of the Air Force and became a squadron commander in the 50th Fighter Aviation Regiment. In April 1947 he was appointed as the deputy commander of a fighter regiment that used the La-7, and he remained in that position until December that year. In 1950 he graduated from the M. V. Frunze Military Academy, after which he became a senior pilot and flight inspector. In 1958 he graduated from the Military Academy of General Staff, and from January to April 1959 he was the deputy commander of the 100th Fighter Aviation Division. He then became the deputy commander of the 87th Fighter Aviation Division. In August 1960 he became the commander of the 19th Fighter Air Defense Division; he left the post in March 1962 and went on the work for the Office of Combat Aviation Training. From 1967 to 1968 he became the head of the department, and from then until his retirement he was of head of the flight safety service of the Soviet Air Defense Sector. In August 1975 he retired from the military. During his career he had flown the La-7, MiG-17, MiG-19P, Su-9, Yak-25, and other aircraft. He died on 1 August 1992 and was buried in the Troyekurovsky cemetery.

== Awards and honors ==
- Twice Hero of the Soviet Union (24 August 1943 and 18 August 1945)
- Honored Military Pilot of the USSR (8 July 1967)
- Three Order of Lenin (2 October 1942, 24 August 1943, and 22 February 1945)
- Four Order of the Red Banner (14 February 1943, 5 November 1944, 11 June 1945, and 2 September 1954)
- Order of Aleksandr Nevsky (25 October 1943)
- Two Order of the Patriotic War 1st class (1 August 1944 and 11 March 1985)
- Two Order of the Red Star (2 August 1941 and 5 November 1954)
- Order "For Service to the Homeland in the Armed Forces of the USSR" 3rd class (30 April 1975)
- campaign and jubilee medals

== See also ==
- List of twice Heroes of the Soviet Union
