= Stepan Shutov =

Soviet Belarusian army colonel and politician

Stepan Fyodorovich Shutov
- Native name: Степан Фёдорович Шутов
- Born: 30 January 1902; Skubeykovo estate, Bobruysky Uyezd, Minsk Governorate, Russian Empire
- Died: 17 April 1963 (aged 61) Kiev, Ukrainian SSR, Soviet Union
- Allegiance: Soviet Union
- Branch: Red Army
- Service years: 1918–1921, 1924–1945
- Rank: Colonel
- Commands: 187th Tank Brigade; 20th Guards Tank Brigade
- Conflicts: Russian Civil War; Polish-Soviet War; World War II; Battle of Moscow; Battle of Kiev; Uman-Botosani Offensive; Second Jassy–Kishinev Offensive
- Awards: Hero of the Soviet Union (2x)

Stepan Fyodorovich Shutov (Belarusian: Сцяпа́н Фё́даравіч Шу́таў, Russian: Степан Фёдорович Шутов; 30 January 1902 – 17 April 1963) was a Red Army Colonel and double Hero of the Soviet Union. Shutov fought in the Russian Civil War and the Polish–Soviet War. He was demobilized after recovering from Typhus in 1921 but was drafted into the Red Army again in 1924. He initially served in cavalry units and later became an officer in the tank troops. When Germany invaded the Soviet Union, Shutov was a tank battalion commander. He fought in the Battle of Moscow. In December 1941, he became deputy commander of a tank brigade and in August 1942, was given command of the 187th Tank Brigade of the 9th Tank Corps. Shutov was appointed commander of the 50th Separate Guards Tank Regiment in October. From May 1943 he took commanders courses at the Military Academy of the Mechanization and Motorization of the Red Army. After graduation Shutov became commander of the 20th Guards Tank Brigade in August 1943. For his leadership of the brigade in the Battle of Kiev (1943), he was awarded the title Hero of the Soviet Union. During the Second Jassy–Kishinev Offensive the brigade captured Ploiești. For his leadership Shutov was awarded the title Hero of the Soviet Union a second time. In September 1944, he became 9th Guards Mechanized Corps deputy commander but a few days later was seriously wounded, resulting in the amputation of his arm while in the hospital. He retired in September 1945 and later became deputy minister for social welfare of the Belorussian SSR.

== Early life ==
Shutov was born on 30 January 1902, on the Skubeykovo estate near the village of Dvarets in Minsk Governorate to a poor peasant family of Belarusian ethnicity with eight children. He worked for the landlord for nine years, and during 1915 worked on the estate. From 1916 Shutov worked in steel and glass mills. He fought in the Russian Civil War, becoming a local partisan and Red Guard in December 1917, fighting against German troops and later Polish troops. In the summer of 1920 he joined the 200th Rifle Regiment of the 16th Army as a cavalry scout, but only served for a brief period as he caught typhus and was demobilized upon recovery.

== Interwar ==
Shutov returned to Dvarets and worked on the farm. He joined the Communist Party of the Soviet Union in 1924. In March he was drafted into the Red Army. He served in the 30th Cavalry Regiment named for Stepan Razin of the 4th Siberian Cavalry Brigade. Shutov fought in actions against partisans in Mogilev Governorate. In 1927, he graduated from the Joint Military School named for the Central Executive Committee in Moscow. Between August 1927 and September 1929, he led a platoon in the 58th Separate Reserve Squadron, a special unit whose mission was to persuade peasants to collectivise. After graduating from the Lenin Military-Political Academy in 1930, Shutov became a political commissar in the 1st Reserve Cavalry Regiment.

Shutov graduated from the Leningrad Armored Refresher Courses in 1932. He commanded a company of the 3rd Training Tank Regiment. Shutov became a driving instructor at the Leningrad Armored Refresher Courses and subsequently was head of Junior Technicians courses. In 1937, he graduated from the Academic Refresher courses at the Military Academy of Mechanization and Motorization. On 27 August he was promoted to captain. After graduation, Shutov served in the tank troops in Ukraine. In July 1940 he took command of a heavy tank battalion in the 17th Tank Regiment of the 9th Tank Division.

== World War II ==
In the early days after Operation Barbarossa, Shutov became commander of a tank battalion of the 208th Tank Regiment in the 104th Separate Tank Division. He later became a battalion commander in the 9th Tank Regiment of the 9th Tank Brigade on the Western Front. Shutov fought in the Battle of Moscow in fall 1941. In December he was appointed deputy commander of the 36th Tank Brigade, part of the Moscow Military District and later on the Southwestern Front. At the same time he received promotion to Major. In August 1942 Shutov took command of the 167th Tank Brigade of the 9th Tank Corps. Between October 1942 and May 1943 he led the 50th Separate Guards Tank Regiment. On 29 October 1942 he was promoted to lieutenant colonel. Shutov was awarded the Order of the Red Banner on 11 April 1943. In 1943 he graduated from the academic courses of improvement at the Military Academy of Armored and Mechanized Forces.

In August 1943, Shutov was appointed commander of the 20th Guards Tank Brigade of the 5th Guards Tank Corps. He led the brigade in the Battle of Kiev. In October the brigade was one of the first tank units into the Lyutezhsky bridgehead. The brigade began the offensive on 3 November and within a day broke through into the suburbs of Kiev. By the next day the brigade had advanced into the city itself. On 10 January 1944 Shutov received the title Hero of the Soviet Union and the Order of Lenin for his actions. On 21 February he was promoted to colonel. During the Uman–Botoșani Offensive in March and April 1944, the 20th Guards Tank Brigade was among the first to cross the Prut and advance to the Romanian border.

Shutov led the brigade in the Second Jassy–Kishinev Offensive during August. During the offensive to break the Axis line at the Focșani Gate the brigade advanced over 100 kilometers in two days by the end of 27 August. On 30 August, it captured Ploiești. During these actions the brigade reportedly destroyed over 20 German heavy tanks. On 13 September, Shutov received a second award of the title Hero of the Soviet Union and the Order of Lenin. He became deputy commander of the 9th Guards Mechanized Corps in mid-September. A few days later, Shutov was seriously wounded during a night battle in the Southern Carpathians, resulting in the amputation of his arm while in hospital. In 1945, he was awarded the United States Distinguished Service Cross for his actions.

== Postwar ==
Shutov was discharged in September 1945. He worked as Belorussian SSR Deputy Minister of Social Welfare between 1946 and 1947. He was a deputy of the Supreme Soviet of the USSR during its second convocation between 1946 and 1950. Between 1951 and 1955, he was a deputy of the Supreme Soviet of the Byelorussian Soviet Socialist Republic during its third convocation. He lived in Minsk and died on 17 April 1963. Shutov was buried in the Baikove Cemetery in Kiev.

== Legacy ==
A bronze bust of Shutov was erected in Glusk. A street in Kiev was also named for Shutov, at the beginning of which a plaque was located.

== See also ==
- List of twice Heroes of the Soviet Union
