= Ivan Shkadov =

Army General (1913–1991)

Ivan Nikolaevich Shkadov
- Иван Николаевич Шкадов
- Born: 2 May [O.S. 19 April] 1913; Naumovo, Kaluga Governorate, Russian Empire
- Died: 15 February 1991 (aged 77); Moscow, Russian SFSR, USSR
- Military career
- Allegiance: Soviet Union
- Branch: Red Army (Soviet Army from 1946)
- Service years: 1935–1991
- Rank: Army general
- Commands: 8th Guards Tank Division; Group of Soviet Military Specialists in Cuba; Northern Group of Forces
- Conflicts: Soviet–Japanese Border Wars; Battle of Lake Khasan; World War II
- Awards: Hero of the Soviet Union

Ivan Nikolaevich Shkadov (Russian: Иван Николаевич Шкадов; 2 May [O.S. 19 April] 1913 – 15 February 1991) was an army general of the Soviet Army and a Hero of the Soviet Union.

Shkadov served in tank units from the late 1930s and commanded tank brigades and regiments during World War II for which he was awarded the title Hero of the Soviet Union in 1978. During the Cold War, he went on to senior posts in the armed forces, which included command of Soviet military advisors in Cuba and the Northern Group of Forces, ending his career as chief of the Main Personnel Directorate.

== Early life and prewar service ==
Born in the village of Naumovo, Kaluga Governorate, on 2 May 1913, Shkadov was drafted into the Red Army in October 1935 and sent to study at the Kharkov Tank School. After graduating in June 1938, he served in the 2nd Separate Tank Brigade (later the 42nd Separate Light Tank Brigade) of the 1st Separate Red Banner Army as a platoon commander of the 2nd Separate Tank Battalion, a deputy tank company commander, assistant chief of staff of the 136th Separate Tank Battalion, and chief of staff of the 216th Separate Flamethrower Tank Battalion. He fought in the Battle of Lake Khasan. In April 1941 he became senior adjutant of the 4th Flamethrower Tank Battalion of the 109th Tank Regiment of the 58th Tank Division of the 2nd Red Banner Army.

== World War II ==
After Operation Barbarossa began, Shkadov was sent to the front and on 16 July became assistant chief of staff for reconnaissance of the 216th Tank Regiment of the 108th Tank Division. He fought on the Bryansk and Western Fronts as part of the 50th Army, including in the Battle of Moscow. In December 1941 he became a company commander in a heavy tank regiment, and in January 1942 commander of the 257th Tank Battalion of the 108th Separate Tank Brigade, formed from the 108th Tank Division. From March he fought with the brigade on the Western Front south of Yukhnov, but was severely wounded in April and evacuated to a hospital. After recovering, Shkadov became commander of the 350th Separate Tank Battalion of the 169th Tank Brigade in June. As part of the 13th Tank Corps, the brigade fought in the Battle of Stalingrad. From November he commanded the 52nd Separate Tank Regiment, part of the 2nd Guards Army of the Stalingrad Front and then the Southern Front from January 1943.

In late March the regiment was withdrawn to the Tula Tank Camp for rebuilding, and after returning to the front fought in the Battle of the Dnieper, the Dnieper–Carpathian offensive, and the Second Jassy–Kishinev offensive. From 17 November 1944 Shkadov commanded the 96th Separate Tank Brigade, which on 24 November became part of the 37th Army, garrisoned in Bulgaria.

== Postwar ==
After the end of the war, Shkadov continued to command the brigade, which became the 96th Army Heavy Self-Propelled Artillery Regiment in July 1945, then served as commander of the 89th Guards Heavy Self-Propelled Artillery Regiment and deputy commander of the 25th Guards Mechanized Division. After graduating from Academic Courses for Technical Improvement at the Military Academy of Armored and Mechanized Forces, Shkadov took command of the 8th Guards Tank Division of the Belorussian Military District in November 1953. Sent to study at the Military Academy of the General Staff in November 1957, he graduated from Higher Academic Courses and the special faculty there in 1958 and 1959.

In September 1959, Shkadov was appointed first deputy commander-in-chief of the 6th Guards Tank Army of the Kiev Military District. In March 1961 he was appointed deputy commander-in-chief of the forces of the Carpathian Military District for combat training and higher educational institutions while simultaneously serving as chief of the district combat training directorate. Serving as a chief of Soviet military advisers in Cuba between February 1964 and March 1967 and deputy commander for combat training of the Group of Soviet Forces in Cuba, Shkadov became commander of the Northern Group of Forces in May 1967. Shkadov then held a succession of senior posts, including first deputy chief of the Military Academy of the General Staff in December 1968, chief of the Main Directorate of Higher Educational Institutions in July 1969, and chief of the Main Personnel Directorate in August 1972. Promoted to army general on 29 April 1975, Shkadov was made a Hero of the Soviet Union on 21 February 1978 for his actions in World War II. In his capacity as chief of the Main Personnel Directorate, he became a deputy minister of defense in February 1982. Shkadov was transferred to the Group of Inspectors General of the Ministry of Defense, a retirement post for senior officers, in February 1987. In the 1980s he was chairman of the editorial board for a biographical dictionary of Heroes of the Soviet Union. Shkadov died on 15 February 1991 in Moscow after being struck by a car driven by a Cuban diplomat and was buried in Novodevichy Cemetery.

== Awards ==
His awards include:

Soviet Union

- Hero of the Soviet Union (21 February 1978)
- Order of Lenin (8 January 1942, 21 February 1978, 1983)
- Order of the October Revolution (28 April 1973)
- Order of the Red Banner, five times (1 October 1943, 28 February 1944, 1956, 1967, 1969)
- Order of Kutuzov, 3rd class (17 October 1944)
- Order of the Patriotic War, 1st class (11 March 1985)
- Order of the Red Star, twice (25 October 1938, 1950)
- Medal "For Battle Merit" (1946)
- Medal "For the Defence of Stalingrad" (1942)
- Medal "For the Defence of Moscow" (1944)
- Medal "For the Victory over Germany in the Great Patriotic War 1941–1945" (1945)
- Medal "For Distinction in Guarding the State Border of the USSR" (1983)
- jubilee medals

Foreign Awards

People's Republic of Bulgaria:

- Order of the People's Republic of Bulgaria, 1st class (1985) and 2nd class (1974)
- Medal "Patriotic War 1944-1945"
- Medal "For Strengthening brotherhood in Arms"
- Medal "30 Years of Victory over Nazi Germany"
- Medal "1300 Years of Bulgaria"
- Medal "90th Anniversary of the Birth of Georgi Dimitrov"
- Medal "100th Anniversary of Birth of Georgi Dimitrov"
- Medal "100 Years of the Liberation of Bulgaria from the Ottoman Yoke"

Cuba:

- Order of Ernesto Che Guevara, 1st class
- Medal "20th Anniversary of the Storming of the Moncada Barracks"
- Medal "20th Anniversary of the Revolutionary Armed Forces of Cuba"
- Medal "30th Anniversary of the Revolutionary Armed Forces of Cuba"
- Medal "Warrior-internationalist", 1st class

Czechoslovakia:

- Medal “For Strengthening Friendship in Arms”, Golden class
- Medal "40 Years of the Liberation of Czechoslovakia by the Soviet Army" (1985)

German Democratic Republic:

- Scharnhorst Order
- Medal Brotherhood in Arms, Gold class
- Military Order "For Merit to the People and Fatherland", Gold class
- Medal "30 Years of the National People's Army"

Hungarian People's Republic:

- Order of the Flag of the Republic of Hungary
- Medal "For Combat Commonwealth", 1st class
- Medal "30 Years of the People's Army of the GDR" (1980)

Mongolian People's Republic:

- Order of the Red Banner
- Order of Military Merit (1971)
- Medal "30 years of the Victory in Khalkhin-Gol" (1969)
- Medal "40 Years of Victory in Khalkhin-Gol" (1979)
- Medal "50 Years of the Mongolian People's Revolution" (1971)
- Medal "30 Years of Victory over Militaristic Japan" (1975)
- Medal "50 Years of the Mongolian People's Army" (1971)
- Medal "60 Years of the Mongolian People's Army" (1981)

North Korea:

- Medal "40 Years of the Liberation of Korea" (1985)

Polish People's Republic:

- Order of Polonia Restituta, Commander (1968) and Officer's crosses
- Medal "Brotherhood in Arms" (1988)
- Medal "On Guard for Peace", 1st class

Socialist Republic of Romania:

- Order of Tudor Vladimirescu, 1st class (1974)
- Medal "For Military Merit" (1985)
- Medal "25 Years of the Liberation of Romania" (1969)
- Medal "30 Years of the Liberation of Romania" (1974)
