= Sergey Gritsevets =

Soviet Union major and pilot

Sergey Ivanovich Gritsevets
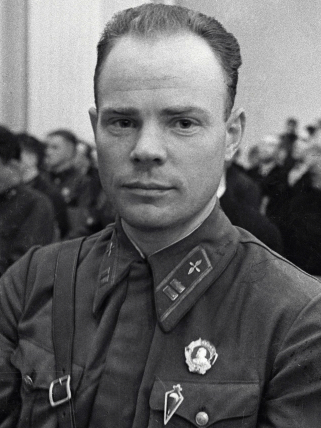
- Born: 19 July [O.S. 6 July] 1909; Baranavichy Raion, Russian Empire (now Belarus)
- Died: 16 September 1939 (aged 30); Vitebsk, Byelorussian SSR, Soviet Union
- Military career
- Allegiance: Soviet Union
- Branch: Soviet Air Force
- Service years: 1931 – 1939
- Rank: Major
- Conflicts: Spanish Civil War; Battle of Khalkhin Gol
- Awards: Hero of the Soviet Union (twice)

Sergey Ivanovich Gritsevets (Belarusian: Сяргей Іванавіч Грыцавец, Russian: Сергей Иванович Грицевец; 19 July [O.S. 6 July] 1909 – 16 September 1939) was a Soviet major and pilot who was twice awarded the title Hero of the Soviet Union.

== Early life ==
Gritsevets was born on 19 July [O.S. 6 July] 1909 Barautsy, Minsk Governorate (in present-day Brest Region, Belarus) to a Belarusian peasant family before the formation of the Soviet Union. His family relocated to the village of Shumikha in the Kurgan Oblast in 1914 due to the start of the First World War. There, after completing his seventh grade of school in 1927, he began working at a railway station; but he soon moved to Zlatoust in Chelyabinsk to attend law school and work as a mechanic. He entered the military in 1931, and joined the communist party that year.

== Aviation career ==
After graduating from the Orenburg Military Aviation School of Pilots in September 1932 he was assigned to the 3rd Squadron of the 5th Aviation Brigade. In December 1933 he was promoted to the flight commander of the 1st Red Banner Fighter Aviation Squadron named after V.I.Lenin; the squadron was originally based in Krasnogvardeysky, but was transferred to Bochkarevo in 1934. The next year in led a flight of six I-16's on the Bochkarevo - Khabarobsk - Spassk-Dalny route, and achieved a new time record for the route by flying it in three hours and ten minutes. In July 1936 he was sent to the Odessa Military Aviation School of Pilots to attend combat courses, and after completing them he worked as a flight instructor for pilots who were going to be deployed to Spain.

=== Spanish civil war ===
From June to October 1938 Gritsevets was deployed in Spain as the commander of the 5th Free-hunting Squadron as part of the Soviet Union's assistance to the Spanish Republican Air Force. Throughout the conflict he gained 115 flight hours in combat, flew 88 combat sorties, engaged in 42 dogfights, gained eleven shared victories, and at least one solo victory; sources widely differ about the number of victories he gained in Spain. Some sources credit him with just one solo victory, some indicate six or seven victories, but others indicate a tally around thirty. For his actions in Spain he was awarded the title Hero of the Soviet Union on 22 February 1939, although the official publications did not mention is participation in the war Spain and only described him as heroic, since Soviet participation in the Spanish civil war was classified at the time of the awarding.

=== Khalkhin Gol ===
Not long after returning to the Soviet Union from Spain, Gritsevets was sent to Mongolia to command a fighter aviation regiment in Mongolia. Many other experienced Soviet pilots, including Grigory Kravchenko, Yakov Smushkevich, and Sergey Denisov were also deployed to Khalkhin Gol to provide assistance to the Mongolian People's Army Air Force, which had been crippled by NKVD arrests and decimated by Japanese aviation. He was originally supposed to command the 8th Fighter Aviation Regiment, but upon arriving he was put in charge of a squadron that used the I-153 and I-16 in the 70th Fighter Aviation Regiment instead. On 26 June 1939, during a mission flying an I-16, he rescued Vyacheslav Zabaluyev, who had been shot down 60 km behind enemy lines; Gritsevets landed his fighter on the steppe near Zabaluyev's fallen plane and gave him a ride back to safe territory. Throughout the battle he flew a total of 138 sorties, gained several team shootdowns, and personally shot down three Japanese aircraft. On 29 August 1939 he was awarded the title Hero of the Soviet Union again.

== Death ==
On 11 September 1939 Gritsevets and other pilots who were awarded the title Hero of the Soviet Union for actions in the battle of Khalkhin Gol took off from Mongolia to Moscow. En route they stopped by Ulaanbaatar, where they were greeted by Khorloogiin Choibalsan. Upon arrival in Moscow he was placed in command of the 58th Fighter Aviation Brigade, so on 16 September 1939 he flew out to Bolbasovo airfield, where the unit was located in preparation for the invasion of Poland. That night he died in a runway collision while landing an I-16 in poor visibility conditions. The pilot of the plane he collided into survived, but was badly injured.

== Final victory tally ==
There is no consensus among historians about the exact number of aerial victories scored by Gritsevets. Many Soviet and Russian sources credit him with having over 40 victories, although most modern historians doubt that figure and consider it much more likely to be the number of victories for his entire unit. Mikhail Maslov credits him at total of 20 solo victories - one in China, seven in Spain and the rest in Khalkhin Gol; however, no other sources indicate that Gritsevets was in China before going to Spain. Russian historians Andrey Simonov and Nikolai Bodrikhin tried to find official documents to confirm his aerial victories, but discovered that there were none confirming his individual victories in Spain, since only collective victories of his squadron were recorded; so they estimated that he had either four solo and 13 group victories total, or a total 30 total victories including six solo and eleven group victories from Spain.

== Awards and honors ==
- Twice Hero of the Soviet Union (22 February 1939 and 29 August 1939)
- Order of Lenin (22 February 1939)
- Order of the Red Banner of Mongolia (10 August 1939)
