= Ivan Stepanenko =

Soviet flying ace (1920–2007)

Ivan Nikiforovich Stepanenko
- Russian: Иван Никифорович Степаненко; Ukrainian: Іван Ничипорович Степаненко
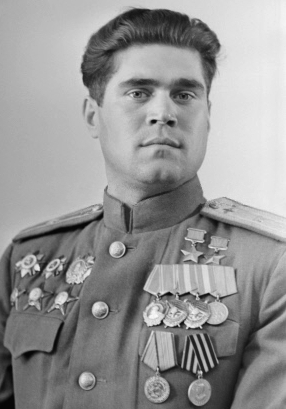
- Born: 13 April 1920; Nekhayki village, Kiev Governorate, Ukrainian SSR
- Died: 31 May 2007 (aged 87); Cherkasy, Ukraine
- Military career
- Allegiance: Soviet Union
- Branch: Soviet Air Force
- Service years: 1940 – 1976
- Rank: Major-General of Aviation
- Unit: 4th Fighter Aviation Regiment
- Conflicts: World War II
- Awards: Hero of the Soviet Union (twice)

Ivan Nikiforovich Stepanenko (Russian: Иван Никифорович Степаненко, Ukrainian: Іван Ничипорович Степаненко; 13 April 1920 – 31 May 2007) was a Soviet pilot who became a flying ace with over 30 solo shootdowns during World War II. He remained in the military after the end of the war and went on to fly a variety of MiG aircraft and become a Major-General.

== Early life ==
Stepanenko was born on 13 April 1920 to a Ukrainian family in Nekhayki village before the Ukrainian SSR was incorporated into the USSR. After completing his seventh grade of school in 1936 he worked at a collective farm until he got a job as a mechanic at a car factory in the city of Dniprodzerzhynsk, where he also attended an aeroclub that he graduated from in 1939. After entering the military in May 1940 he continued his aviation education and shortly after the start of Operation Barbarossa in July 1941 he graduated from the Kachin Military Aviation School of Pilots.

== World War II ==
Immediately after the German invasion of the Soviet Union, Stepanenko was deployed to the warfront as a pilot in the 4th Fighter Aviation Regiment. Initially the junior pilots of the regiment were not allowed to fly sorties, and their training took place on the ground. Eventually they were transferred to the 22nd Reserve Aviation Regiment, where they learned to fly the British-made Hawker Hurricane before being sent to fly air defense missions in December. Stepanenko flew his first sortie in January 1942, but did not gain his first aerial victory until summer 1942. That month, he was suffered multiple shrapnel wounds and badly injured during a dogfight. After making a forced landing he remained in the hospital for over a week and had to have surgery to remove shrapnel from his forearm. He soon returned to flying and switched to using the Yak-7B. While on the Stalingrad front he ended up making another forced landing with a malfunctioning engine.

In late summer 1942 Stepanenko, Amet-khan Sultan, Aleksey Ryazanov, and several other pilots from the 4th Fighter Aviation Regiment were selected to compose a "free-hunting" group in Stalingrad. In early October he and his wingman V.V.Mochin engaged a group of four Bf 109; both of them were eventually forced to make emergency landings, but Stepanenko managed to shoot down two planes before succumbing to his wounds and landing his damaged Yak-7B. When he was released from the hospital and allowed to fly again, he learned that most of the aces in his regiment were transferred to the prestigious 9th Guards Fighter Aviation Regiment, composed of pilots that were already aces and those considered potential aces. Stepanenko was offered an opportunity to join the regiment but chose to stay in his unit.

In January 1943 he shot down a Ju 52 in the Stalingrad region while flying a Yak-1. Immediately after landing from a training flight he spotted the plane, so he took off and began to chase it without even refueling his plane. He soon found a group of six Ju 52s dropping cargo to enemy troops, and after engaging one of them twice he successfully shot it down but was forced to quickly return to his airfield and not engage any more of them due to a lack of fuel. During a dogfight in May he shot down a Bf 109 and a He 111; with the help of his squadron the remaining group of enemy bombers was dispersed and forced to drop their bombs away from the Soviet troops they had previously attacked. A similar incident occurred in August during a mission to provide cover to Soviet ground troops, during which Stepanenko's squadron encountered a huge formation containing many as 60 enemy aircraft, mostly Ju 88 and He 111 bombers. During the ensuing battle Stepanenko shared in the destruction of a Fw 190 and personally shot down two more. He was soon nominated for the title Hero of the Soviet Union on 18 August for having flown 232 sorties, flown in 75 aerial battles, personally shot down 14 planes and shared in the destruction of seven more aircraft. The title was first awarded to him on 13 April 1944; earlier that year in February he led a group of four Yak-9 aircraft in two missions to intercept groups of Ju 87 and Bf 109s, and managed to inflict losses on the enemy without sustaining any casualties on the Soviet side.

Stepanenko was nominated for the title Hero of the Soviet Union for a second time on 28 January 1945; by then, he had flown 395 missions, engaged in 112 dogfights, and personally shot down 32 enemy aircraft. He was awarded the title after the end of the war on 18 August 1945. Having entered the war as an enlisted junior pilot, he was a squadron commander with the rank of major at the end of the conflict. In total he shared in the destruction of nine enemy aircraft, personally shot down 32, and engaged in 118 dogfights throughout the course of 414 missions. He marched in the Victory Day Parade on 24 June 1945 as part of the Leningrad front column; before his unit was made part of the Leningrad front it had fought having fought under Bryansk, Stalingrad, Southern, North Caucasian, and Western fronts of the war. He had flown in the battles for Voronezh, Stalingrad, Rostov, Kuban, Oryol, Riga, Polotsk, and other cities.

== Postwar ==
After the war Stepanenko remained in the air force. He graduated from the M. V. Frunze Military Academy in 1949, and then became commander of the 83rd Guards Air Defense Regiment; he then served as a pilot-inspector of fighter aviation combat training from April 1951 to September 1951. In that position he flew the La-11, Yak-17, and MiG-15. He then became the commander of the 41st Air Defense Regiment, where he flew the MiG-15 and MiG-17. He left the position in November 1955, and in 1957 he graduated from the Military Academy of General Staff. From then until 1961 he commanded the 16th Guards Fighter Aviation Division, which used the MiG-15, MiG-17, and MiG-19; during that time he was promoted to the rank of General Major in 1958. In February 1961 he was made deputy commander of the 71st Fighter Aviation Corps, which was based in East Germany and flew the MiG-19, MiG-21, and Yak-25. From February 1966 until May 1968 he was the commander of the 30th Air Army, based in the Riga. From 1968 until his retirement he was the deputy commander of the 14th Air Army. He retired from the military in 1976, having accumulated over 3000 flight hours during his career. While a civilian he wrote a memoir before he died on 31 May 2007 at the age of 87 in Ukraine.

== Awards and honors ==
- Twice Hero of the Soviet Union (13 April 1944 and 18 August 1945)
- Honored Military Pilot of the USSR (16 August 1966)
- Order of Lenin (13 April 1945)
- Three Order of the Red Banner (23 October 1942, 19 September 1944, and 4 June 1955)
- Order of Aleksandr Nevsky (19 December 1944)
- Three Order of the Patriotic War (1st class - 15 January 1945 and 11 March 1985; 2nd class - 11 February 1943)
- Five Order of the Red Star (31 July 1942, 23 July 1943, 11 May 1945, 22 February 1955, and 30 December 1956)
- Order "For Service to the Homeland in the Armed Forces of the USSR" (30 April 1975)
- campaign and commemorative medals
