= Ivan Pavlov (aviator) =

Soviet aviator (1922–1950)

Ivan Fomich Pavlov
- Иван Фомич Павлов
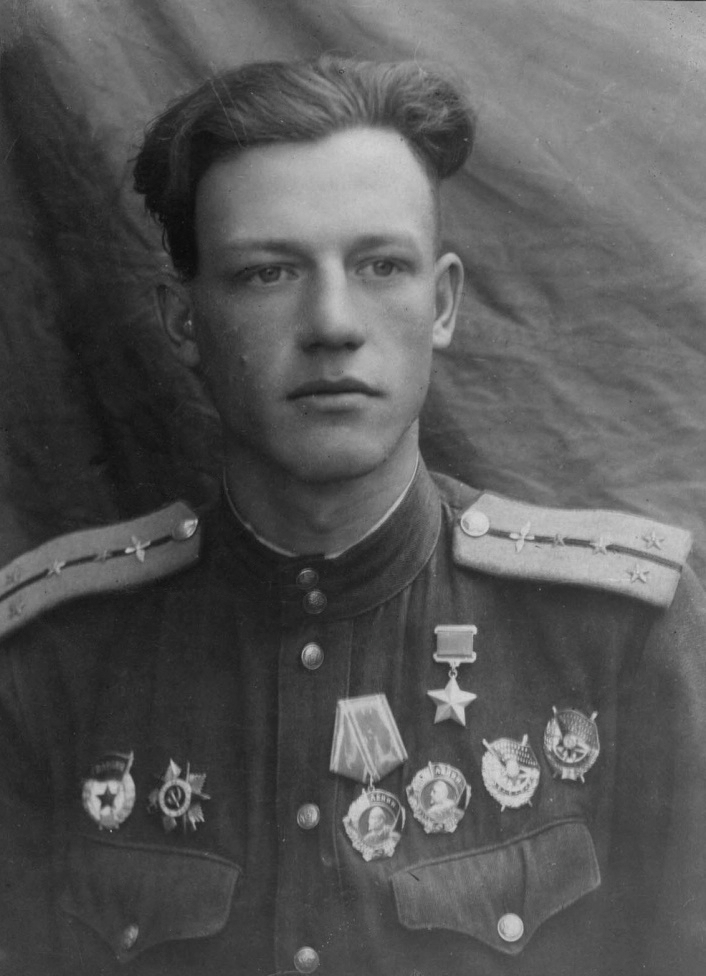
- Born: 25 June 1922; Boris-Romanovka village (located within present-day Kostanay District, Kazakhstan)
- Died: 12 October 1950 (aged 28); Near Mikhailovka, Chernoarmeysky Raion, Rovno Oblast, Ukrainian SSR
- Military career
- Allegiance: Soviet Union
- Branch: Soviet Air Force
- Rank: Major
- Unit: 6th Guards Assault Aviation Regiment
- Conflicts: World War II
- Awards: Hero of the Soviet Union (twice)

Ivan Fomich Pavlov (Russian: Иван Фомич Павлов; 25 June 1922 – 12 October 1950) was a ground attack pilot of the Soviet Air Forces during World War II. He served as both a flight and squadron commander in 6th Guards Assault Aviation Regiment during the conflict, for which he was twice named a Hero of the Soviet Union. Pavlov continued to serve in the Air Force postwar, rising to command a regiment, but was killed in an air accident only five years after the end of the war.

== Early life ==
Ivan Fomich Pavlov was born into a Russian peasant family in the village of Boris-Romanovka, 45 kilometres (28 mi) north of Kostanay in Kostanay Governorate (now in Kazakhstan). From 1931 to 1932 he lived in the station of Terensai, now in the Adamovsky District of Orenburg Oblast, moving in 1932 to the city of Magnitogorsk in Chelyabinsk Oblast. Pavlov graduated seventh grade in 1937, and entered the Magnitogorsk Industrial Tekhnikum. He received flight training at the Magnitogorsk Aeroclub, graduating from both it and the tekhnikum in 1940. He joined the Red Army in December of that year, and was selected for the 1st Chkalov Military Aviation School for Pilots.

== World War II ==
Pavlov continued flight training after the German invasion of the Soviet Union and in May 1942 graduated from the pilots' school with the rank of sergeant. Pavlov fought in World War II with the 6th Guards Assault Aviation Regiment, a ground attack unit, beginning as a pilot and rising to senior pilot, deputy squadron commander, squadron commander and regimental navigator in the course of the war. He fought on the Kalinin Front from June 1942, the 1st Baltic Front from October 1943, and the 3rd Belorussian Front from February 1945 to the end of the war in May. He participated in the Rzhev–Sychyovka offensive, the Rzhev–Vyazma offensive, the Dukhovshchina–Demidov offensive, the Nevel offensive, the Gorodok offensive, the Vitebsk offensive, the Vitebsk–Orsha offensive, the Polotsk offensive, the Šiauliai offensive, the Riga offensive, the Memel offensive, the East Prussian offensive, and the Samland offensive.

Pavlov completed 77 combat sorties between June 1942 and May 1943, leading several successful reconnaissance and attack missions. In his first 26 sorties, from May to August 1942, flying the single-seat variant of the Ilyushin Il-2, he was credited with the destruction of two German crossings, the first on the Volga in the area of the village of Varyushino, and the second on the Dnieper by the village of Mityukovo. He was also credited with the destruction of three tanks, twelve vehicles, six field guns, eight anti-aircraft guns, and six ammunition carts. Pavlov received his first promotion, to senior sergeant, on 8 August. On 17 August his aircraft was badly damaged by anti-aircraft fire and fighters, and Pavlov himself was concussed. Despite this, he managed to fly his damaged Il-2 back to his airfield. After the successful landing, his plane was sent to the rear for major repairs. Over the Rzhev area, he entered an air battle with German fighters on 23 August and was credited with downing one Bf 109 on his severely damaged Il-2. For the completion of his first 26 sorties, he was awarded the Order of the Red Banner on 26 August. In the fall of 1942 he was credited with the destruction of four steam engines, ten train cars, eight guns, 32 vehicles, thirteen wagons with cargo, and up to 130 German soldiers. Pavlov received the Order of the Patriotic War, 1st class on 4 December for his completion of 29 more combat sorties. That same day he was promoted to starshina.

The 6th Guards Assault Aviation Regiment was re-equipped with the two-seat variant of the Il-2 in January 1943. In March 1943 Pavlov completed a special mission to drop 15,000 rounds of ammunition to a surrounded partisan group despite difficult weather conditions. He became an officer with the rank of junior lieutenant on 12 April, was promoted to lieutenant on 4 July and to senior lieutenant on 20 September. He was awarded a second Order of the Red Banner on 2 June for completing nineteen combat sorties. Pavlov completed three sorties in a day on 13 August, leading nine Il-2s over the Dukhovshchina area. Diving from an altitude of 700 meters, making 3–5 runs on the targets, he effectively attacked German artillery, mortar and anti-aircraft batteries. He was credited with destroying eight artillery batteries and their crews, five anti-aircraft artillery firing points, two field guns, and up to 150 personnel. Leading a group of six Il-2s on 23 August, in the attack against a fortified point in the area of the village of Buyantsevo, Pavlov was personally credited with the destruction of a field artillery gun, two mortars, three vehicles, and more than thirty soldiers. While on the return flight the group encountered fifteen Ju 87 bombers escorted by 15 Bf 109s at an altitude of 600 to 1,000 meters. The Il-2s engaged the German aircraft and without loss were credited with destroying two Ju 87s. Pavlov was credited with downing one of these with a short burst of cannon fire.

On 14 September, Pavlov led six Il-2s against a German armored train and attacked it from 400 meters, despite heavy anti-aircraft fire. The train was put out of action by the hits of several 100 kg bombs. For his courage and heroism in the completion of over 127 sorties by 9 October 1943 flight commander Pavlov was awarded the gold star of the Hero of the Soviet Union award and the Order of Lenin on 4 February 1944. When the news of the award reached his home area a collection was organized and funds were raised for the completion of four ground-attack aircraft for his squadron, one of which was presented to Pavlov himself. The aircraft bore the inscription: "To our compatriot Hero of the Soviet Union I. Pavlov - from the workers of Kostanay." Pavlov flew a few combat sorties with frontline correspondent Boris Shukanov as his gunner. After the war, Shukanov wrote the book Trajectory of a Feat in which he warmly praised Pavlov and recalled the combat sorties he flew with the pilot.

The summer of 1944 was a period of intensive combat for Pavlov, who had been promoted to captain on 2 May. In support of the advance during Operation Bagration, he flew as many as three sorties every day. On 1 July, flying in a group of four Il-2s to destroy a crossing over the Drissa, being used by retreating German troops, he was able to destroy both the crossing and a few pieces of equipment on the first attack run. He was awarded a second Order of Lenin on 2 August for completing 30 combat sorties. From January to October, during Pavlov's command of the squadron, its pilots completed 690 ground attack sorties, being credited with the destruction of 75 tanks, eight aircraft on the ground, fifteen aircraft in the air, three locomotive engines, 52 railcars, 62 guns, 130 wagons, and more than 2,000 personnel. For his leadership of the squadron Pavlov was awarded the Order of Alexander Nevsky on 7 October. Having completed another 77 sorties by 16 October, Pavlov, now a squadron commander, was awarded the title of Hero of the Soviet Union for a second time on 23 February 1945. In total, during the war he completed 237 combat sorties in the Ilyushin Il-2. He marched in the 1945 Moscow Victory Parade on 24 June with the column from the 1st Baltic Front.

== Postwar ==
After the end of the war, Pavlov continued to serve as navigator of the regiment, stationed in Kaliningrad Oblast. Pavlov entered the Frunze Military Academy in July 1946 and was promoted to major on 28 July 1948. In November 1949 he graduated from the academy before taking command of the 947th Assault Aviation Regiment, at Dubno in western Ukraine in the Carpathian Military District, in January 1950. With the 947th Regiment he flew the Ilyushin Il-10, the replacement for the Il-2. When pilot classifications were introduced in 1950 he received the rating of military pilot 3rd class. Pavlov was killed in the crash of his Il-10 in the area of the village of Mikhailovka, Chernoarmeysky Raion during a night training flight on 12 October 1950.

== Memorials and honors ==
I F Pavlov park, near Romanovka

He was buried in Victory Park in Kostanay where a bronze bust was erected in his memory in 1952, and a street in the town was also named in his honour. Streets in Magnitogorsk and the settlement of Zatobolskoe were also named for him. A memorial plaque was placed on the wall of school in Magnitogorsk that he studied in. Polytechnical College No. 8 in Moscow is named in honor of Pavlov. His name was eternally included in the active service list of his unit (an honour often extended to former Heroes of the Soviet Union who died whilst on active duty).

Pavlov's birthplace of Boris-Romanovka was renamed imeni Pavlova (lit. 'Named for Pavlov') in his honor in 2018 in response to a petition by its residents. A museum dedicated to Pavlov, collecting memorabilia of his life, opened in the village school in 1965. A small park north of his home town along the Tobol is named in his honor (at right).

== Awards ==
- Twice Hero of the Soviet Union (4 February 1944 and 23 February 1945)
- Two Order of Lenin (4 February 1944 and 2 August 1944)
- Two Order of the Red Banner (26 September 1942 and 2 June 1943)
- Order of Alexander Nevsky (7 October 1944)
- Order of the Patriotic War 1st class (4 December 1942)
