= Grigory Kravchenko =

Soviet aviator

Grigory Panteleyevich Kravchenko
- Григорий Пантелеевич Кравченко
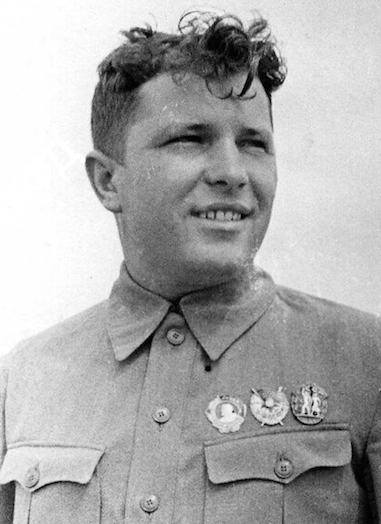
- Born: 12 October [O.S. 29 September] 1912; Golubovka village, Yekaterinoslav Governorate, Russian Empire (now Ukraine)
- Died: 23 February 1943 (aged 30); Sinyavino, Leningrad Oblast, USSR
- Military career
- Allegiance: Soviet Union
- Branch: Soviet Air Force
- Service years: 1931–1943
- Rank: General-Lieutenant of Aviation
- Commands: 11th Mixed Aviation Division; 215th Fighter Aviation Division
- Conflicts: Second Sino-Japanese War; Battles of Khalkhin Gol; World War II; Winter War; Eastern Front †
- Awards: Hero of the Soviet Union (twice)

Grigory Panteleyevich Kravchenko (Russian: Григорий Пантелеевич Кравченко; Ukrainian: Григорій Пантелійович Кравченко; 12 October [O.S. 29 September] 1912 – 23 February 1943) was a test pilot who became a flying ace and twice Hero of the Soviet Union in Asia before the start of Operation Barbarossa. When he was killed in action during World War II near Leningrad, he was a lieutenant general in command of the 215th Fighter Aviation Division.

== Early life ==
Kravchenko was born on 12 October [O.S. 29 September] 1912 to a Ukrainian peasant family in the village of Golubovka, located within present-day Ukraine. In 1914 his family moved to Pakomovka (located within present-day Kazakhstan), where they lived until 1920; they then moved to Zverinogolovskoye. He completed his seventh grade of school in 1930, after which he attended the Moscow Land Management College until 1931; he became a member of the Communist Party that year.

== Military career ==
After entering the military in May 1931, he graduated from the Kacha Military Aviation School of Pilots. He then worked as a flight instructor at the school and trained seven cadets until he was transferred in March 1933 to the 118th Fighter Aviation Squadron. In July 1943 he began work at the State Air Force Research Institute as a test pilot, where he flew with a squadron that conducted tests with I-5, I-14, I-15, and I-16 fighters. After returning from China in November 1939 he continued doing test flights, flying the I-16, I-153, and DI-6 until he left for his deployment to Mongolia in Spring 1939.

=== Second Sino-Japanese War ===
In March 1938 Kravchenko was deployed to China as a flight commander in squadron of Soviet volunteers to assist in the defense of China against the offensive of Japanese aviation. By August when he was recalled from the front, he had attained the position of squadron commander, flown 78 sorties on the I-16, and gained four confirmed shootdowns of enemy aircraft, though some sources credit him with six victories during the conflict. He was awarded the title Hero of the Soviet Union on 22 February 1939 for his actions in the conflict, though newspapers made no mention of his role in the war and simply described him as a hero since the participation of the Soviet Union in the conflict was a military secret.

=== Khalkhin Gol ===
Upon his arrival to Mongolia on 2 June 1939 with a group of Soviet pilots, Kravchenko was posted to the 22nd Fighter Aviation Regiment as an adviser. On 27 June he participated in an intense air battle against over 100 Japanese planes heading to bomb Soviet airfields. He singled out a Ki-15 and tailed it for so long that he ran out of fuel and was forced to make a belly landing. He did not shoot it down, but he survived the ordeal and after two days he was found by the Red Army and returned to his unit, which had mistakenly believed him to have been killed in action and already sent a telegram to Moscow about his "death". Less than a month later he was made commander of the 22nd Regiment after the previous commander was badly wounded. Before the end of the battle he was awarded the title Hero of the Soviet Union on 29 August 1939; he and Sergey Gritsevets were the first people awarded the title twice. Just a few days before the decree awarding him the title he scored his last shootdown, bringing up his tally to four solo and three shared kills. In total he flew 78 sorties in the battle before being recalled from the front on 11 September, when he and other pilots who were awarded the title Hero of the Soviet Union for actions in the battle of Khalkhin Gol took off from Mongolia to Moscow. En route they stopped by Ulaanbaatar, where they were greeted by Khorloogiin Choibalsan.

=== Winter War ===
In October 1939 Kravchenko was appointed as head of the Fighter Aviation Combat Training Directorate, and in December he was made commander of a Special Aviation Brigade based in Estonia; from there they would launch attacks on Finland.

=== Peacetime ===
Kravchenko in Moscow, July 1940

From April to June 1940 he was in charge of the flight inspection division of the air force, after which he was placed in commander of the aviation sector of the Baltic Military District. Earlier that year he had been promoted to the rank of general lieutenant. After graduating from the Military Academy of General Staff in March 1941 he was made commander of the 64th Aviation Division, but he left it in April to return to the military academy. He did not stay at the academy for long due to the start of Operation Barbarossa.

=== World War II ===
Upon the German invasion of the Soviet Union he was placed in command of the 11th Mixed Aviation Division. By November he was promoted to commander of the 3rd Air Force Army. In spring 1942 he served as commander of the 8th Strike Group. From then until his death he was in command of the 215th Fighter Aviation Division. Despite his high rank he actively participated in the battles for Smolensk, Bryansk, Orel, and Leningrad. Vasily Yemelyanko recalled an incident when Kravchenko was in charge of the 11th Division in which he took off in an obsolete fighter and engaged a group of Messerschmitts. On 23 February 1943 he was killed in action after a mission on a La-5 near Leningrad. He had entered the dogfight by having been lured by a single Bf 110 attacking Soviet troops on the ground, while a group of fighters hid behind the clouds near it; when he pursued the Bf 110, the other fighters attacked and shot him down. After bailing out of his stricken plane his parachute failed to open; he survived the landing and was rescued by Soviet troops on the ground, but was unconscious and died just an hour and a half later. His ashes were interred in the Kremlin Wall.

== Awards ==
- Twice Hero of the Soviet Union (22 February 1939 and 29 August 1939)
- Order of Lenin (22 February 1939)
- Two Order of the Red Banner (14 November 1938 and 19 January 1940)
- Order of the Patriotic War 2nd class (22 February 1943)
- Order of the Red Banner of Labour (25 May 1936)
- Order of the Red Banner of Mongolia (10 August 1939)

== See also ==
- Sergey Gritsevets
- Yakov Smushkevich
- Sergey Denisov
