= Vasily Zaitsev (pilot) =

Soviet flying ace (1911–1961)

Vasily Aleksandrovich Zaitsev
- Василий Александрович Зайцев
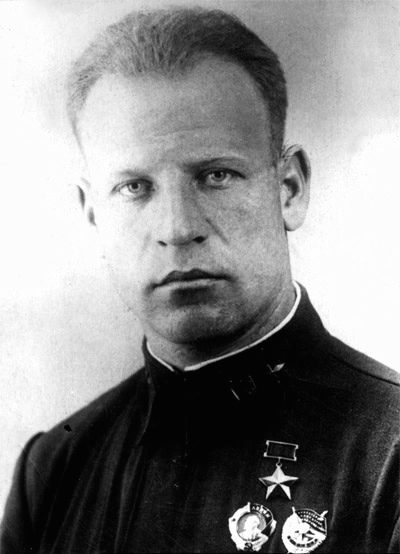
- Born: 10 January [O.S. 28 December 1910] 1911; Semibratskoe, Kolomna district, Moscow Governorate, Russian Empire
- Died: 19 May 1961 (aged 50); Kolomna, Soviet Union
- Military career
- Allegiance: Soviet Union
- Branch: Soviet Air Force
- Service years: 1932–1946
- Rank: Colonel
- Unit: 5th Guards Fighter Aviation Regiment
- Conflicts: World War II
- Awards: Hero of the Soviet Union (twice)

Vasily Aleksandrovich Zaitsev (Russian: Василий Александрович Зайцев; 10 January [O.S. 28 December 1910] 1911 – 19 May 1961) was a Soviet Air Forces World War II flying ace who was twice awarded the title Hero of the Soviet Union.

== Early life ==
Zaitsev was born on 10 January [O.S. 28 December 1910] 1911 to a Russian peasant family in Semibratskoe, Moscow Governorate. His parents died before he and his younger brothers finished growing up, leaving him as the head of the family. After leaving his brothers with relatives he began looking for work, but faced challenges due to having only four years of schooling. In 1927 the Kolomna district Komsomol committee helped him get into trade school, where he developed a passion for machinery and graduated in 1929. He worked at a locomotive plant until entering the military in May 1932.

After graduating from the Luhansk Military Aviation School of Pilots in December 1933, he became a pilot in the 16th Fighter Aviation Squadron. Three years later, he completed flight commander training at the Borisoglebsk Military Aviation School of Pilots, after which he briefly worked as a flight instructor. In November 1939, he transferred to the 42nd Fighter Aviation Regiment. Initially a pilot, there he became an assistant squadron commander and was promoted again in January 1941 when the unit was based in Vilnius. Until later that year, when they were sent for retraining on the LaGG-3, the unit was equipped with I-153 fighters, which became obsolete in World War II.

== World War II ==
Starting in July 1941, Zaitsev was on the front lines of the defense of the Soviet Union against Operation Barbarossa. The squadron under his command was transferred to Colonel Zotov’s mixed aviation group later that month. During the battle for Smolensk, he remained a squadron commander. However, he was soon promoted to regimental navigator of the 129th Fighter Aviation Regiment, which became the 5th Guards Fighter Aviation Regiment upon receiving the guards designation in December. By the end of the war, the unit had shot down more enemy aircraft than any other regiment in the Soviet Air Forces.

Zaitsev became a flying ace by September 1941, and in January 1942 he was nominated for his first gold star for having engaged in 46 dogfights and shot down 12 enemy aircraft. The tally stated by his award nomination sheet indicated he had the second-highest number of victories in 1941 of any Soviet pilot, behind only Boris Safonov. In September 1942, he was promoted to commander of his regiment, which later that year retrained to fly La-5 aircraft. Despite his senior position as regimental commander, he continued to fly combat sorties. Eventually by August 1943, he had tallied nearly 300 sorties and 22 victories, for which he was awarded his second title of Hero on 24 August 1943. Many pilots in his regiment went on to be awarded the title, including Vitaly Popkov, who was awarded it twice. During his tenure as regimental commander, he made a point of flying in simulated dogfights with the new pilots, and was given a Yakovlev UT-2 by Air Force commander Marshal Alexander Novikov for his success.

However, he was badly injured on 5 November 1943 after being forced to dodge two enemy fighters, landing upside down in a field. After remaining in a Moscow hospital for several months, he returned to the front in March 1944, but as deputy commander of the 11th Guards Fighter Aviation Division. He left the unit in the month before the war ended to become the deputy commander of the 2nd Guards Assault Aviation Corps.

During the war, he flew in battles for many major cities and strategically important areas, including Smolensk, Stalingrad, Voroshilovgrad, Kharkov, Belgorod, Donbass, Dnepropetrovsk, Kursk, the Dnieper, and Dresden, accumulating over 323 sorties. The exact breakdown of his tally is unclear; British historian George Mellinger credits him with 34 solo and 19 shared, but estimates by Russian historians are lower, with Andrey Simonov and Nikolai Bodrikhin indicating his tally to have been either 19 solo or 27 solo plus one shared.

== Postwar ==
Due to an accident on 2 October 1945 in which a truck hit the car in which he was a passenger, he suffered a badly broken leg. Despite being forced to remain in the hospital for a long time with a cast on his leg, he did not fully recover and ended up retiring with the rank of colonel in September 1946 due to the injury. He then returned to his hometown, where he headed the Kolomna aeroclub from 1947 to 1953 and was the director of the local tire factory from 1957 to 1959. He died shortly thereafter on 19 May 1961 and was buried in the local cemetery.

== Memory ==
- A bronze bust of the hero is installed in the Vasily Zaitsev park in Kolomna

== Awards and honors ==
- Twice Hero of the Soviet Union (5 May 1942 and 24 August 1943)
- Order of Lenin (5 May 1942)
- Three Orders of the Red Banner (3 November 1941, 28 March 1943, and 18 May 1945)
- Order of Bogdan Khmelnitsky, 2nd class (27 June 1945)
- Order of the Patriotic War, 1st class (16 October 1944)
