= Anatoly Nedbaylo =

- Анатолий Константинович Недбайло
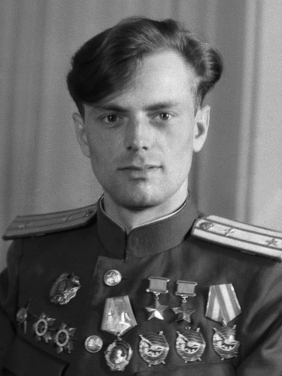
- Born: 28 January 1923; Izium, Ukrainian SSR
- Died: 13 May 2008 (aged 85); Kiev, Ukraine
- Military career
- Allegiance: Soviet Union
- Branch: Soviet Air Force
- Service years: 1941 – 1983
- Rank: General-major
- Unit: 75th Guards Assault Aviation Regiment
- Conflicts: World War II
- Awards: Hero of the Soviet Union (twice)

Anatoly Konstantinovich Nedbaylo (Russian: Анатолий Константинович Недбайло; 28 January 1923 – 13 May 2008) was an Il-2 pilot in the 75th Guards Assault Aviation Regiment of the Soviet Air Forces during the Second World War who was twice awarded the title Hero of the Soviet Union.

== Early life ==
Nedbaylo was born on 28 January 1928 to a Ukrainian peasant family in the village of Izyume. After finishing nine grades of school in 1940 he trained at the Kramatorsky aeroclub, which he graduated from in 1941. In May that year he entered the Red Army, and in February 1943 he graduated from the Voroshilov Military Aviation School of Pilots.

== World War II ==
Having graduated from training in February, Nedbaylo arrived at the Eastern Front of World War II in March. He was placed in the 505th Assault Aviation Regiment, which was soon honored with the Guards designation and renamed the 75th Guards Assault Aviation Regiment on 18 March 1943. During a mission on 6 September 1943 he shot down a Ju 87 dive bomber over Vasilyevka raion.

Starting in 1944, Nedbaylo flew missions with Anton Malyuk as his gunner. They flew roughly 100 sorties together, and on two separate occasions they were shot down. On 5 February 1944 while returning from a target over Nikopol in poor weather, they got into a mid-air collision with another plane, leaving Nedbaylo seriously injured. Malyuk and local infantrymen helped pull the unconscious pilot out of the mangled cockpit. Both aviators in the other plane, I.A.Okhtin and T.A.Tsvirkunov, were killed by the crash. With a fractured left hand he was sent to a hospital, but in less than two months he returned to flying. After Malyuk sustained a serious head injury on mission with another pilot, Nedbaylo began flying with Dmitry Matveev as his gunner.

On 26 June Nedbaylo successfully led a mission that resulted in the destruction of Axis trains in Orsha-Tolochin, Vitebsk. During another mission he shot down a Fw 190 over Vilkaviškis. During a mission in Autumn 1944, Nedbaylo felt a chest pain, but when he landed at his designated airfield after the flight, he discovered that he had been hit by enemy fire; he survived because the bullet had hit his parachute strap locks and flattened before it hit him. For flying 130 missions on the Il-2 he was awarded the title Hero of the Soviet Union on 19 April 1945, and he was awarded the title again on 29 June 1945 for flying at total of 219 missions.

During the war he executed a belly-landing, sustained serious damaged to his aircraft from enemy fire, returned to the airbase with half the tail of his plane gone, and was shot down three times. Originally a low-ranking pilot in his regiment, he rose through the ranks to the position of flight commander and eventually squadron commander.

== Postwar ==
After the end of the war, Nedbaylo remained in the military, and participated in the victory day parade. In 1951 he graduated from the Air Force Academy in Monino. From then until December 1953 he was the deputy head of the Supreme Officer's Flight School. He then became a lecturer of combat training at the academy in Monino, and in November 1956 he became the chief of staff of an aviation regiment. In December 1957 he was placed in charge of the department of tactics and military history at the Kharkov Higher Military Command School, but in October 1960 he was switched to the department of military history at the facility's School of Engineering. In 1962 he became the deputy head of the Kazan Higher Command Engineering School, after which he was part of the faculty at the Riga Higher Military Command School starting in 1964. He was the deputy superintendent of the Kiev Higher Air Force Engineering Academy from 1968 until his retirement in 1983. He was promoted to the rank lieutenant-colonel in 1949 and colonel in 1954 before he became a General-major of Aviation in 1970.

== Awards and honors ==
- Twice Hero of the Soviet Union (19 April 1945 and 29 June 1945)
- Order of Lenin (19 April 1945)
- Three Order of the Red Banner (31 October 1943, 7 January 1944, and 29 January 1945)
- Order of Aleksandr Nevsky (18 September 1944)
- Three Order of the Patriotic War 1st class (15 August 1944, 19 April 1945, and 11 March 1985)
- Order of the Patriotic War 2nd class (3 May 1944)
- Two Order of the Red Star (23 July 1943 and 16 February 1982)
- Order of Bohdan Khmelnytsky (3rd class - 7 May 1995; 2nd class - 5 May 1999; 1st class - 14 October 1999)
- campaign and service medals
