= List of Heroes of the Soviet Union (S) =

The title Hero of the Soviet Union was the highest distinction of the Soviet Union. It was awarded 12,775 times. Due to the large size of the list, it has been broken up into multiple pages.

- Grigory Sabanov ru
- Anany Sabashnikov ru
- Fyodor Sabelnikov ru
- Mikhail Sabenin ru
- Fayzdrakhman Sabriov ru
- Hafiz Sabirov ru
- Vladimir Sablin ru
- Pyotr Sablin ru
- Aleksandr Saburov
- Georgy Saburov ru
- Vladimir Savva ru
- Arkady Savvateev ru
- Aleksandr Vasilyevich Savelev ru
- Aleksandr Fyodorovich Savelev ru
- Afanasy Spiridonovich Savelev ru
- Valentin Savelev ru
- Vasily Antonovich Savelev ru
- Vasily Lyvovich Savelev ru
- Yevgeny Savelev ru
- Ivan Savelev ru
- Konstantin Aleksandrovich Savelev ru
- Konstantin Ivanovich Savelev ru
- Mikhail Savelev ru
- Fyodor Savelev ru
- Akim Savenko ru
- Nikolai Savenko ru
- Viktor Savin ru
- Nikolai Savin ru
- Viktor Savinykh (twice)
- Nikolai Savinykh ru
- Svetlana Savitskaya (twice)
- Yevgeny Savitsky (twice)
- Konstantin Savostin ru
- Sergey Savostyanov ru
- Pyotr Savichkin ru
- Ivan Savoshchev ru
- Aleksandr Savushkin ru
- Stepan Savushkin ru
- Aleksandr Savchenko ru
- Vladimir Savchenko ru
- Ivan Savchenko ru
- Nikolai Savchenko ru
- Pavel Savchenko ru
- Aleksandr Savchenkov ru
- Grigory Savchuk ru
- Stepan Savchuk ru
- Pavel Sagaydachny ru
- Yuri Sagaydachny ru
- Pavel Sadakov ru
- Nikolai Sadovnikov ru
- Aleksandr Sadovoy ru
- Ivan Sadovsky ru
- Yuri Sadovsky ru
- Pavel Sadamskov ru
- Samat Sadriev ru
- Fyodor Sadchikov ru
- Botobay Sadykov ru
- Samat Sadykov ru
- Yusif Sadykhov
- Timofey Saevich ru
- Vasily Saenko ru
- Ivan Saenko ru
- Mikhail Saenko ru
- Pyotr Saenko ru
- Viktor Sazhinov ru
- Afanasy Sazonov ru
- Ivan Sazonov ru
- Mikhail Sazonov ru
- Nikolai Arkhipovich Sazonov ru
- Nikolai Petrovich Sazonov ru
- Rim Sazonov ru
- Amirali Saidbekov ru
- Gabdulkhay Saitov ru
- Sadyk Sayranov ru
- Nikolai Sakov ru
- Anton Salamakha ru
- Gataulla Salikhov ru
- Midkhat Salikhov ru
- Esed Salikov ru
- Aleksandr Salov ru
- Mikhail Salov ru
- Vladimir Salomatin ru
- Mikhail Salomatin ru
- Ivan Salykov ru
- Aleksey Salnikov ru
- Mikhail Salnikov ru
- Mikhail Samarin ru
- Ivan Samarkin ru
- Nikolai Samarkov ru
- Ivan Sambuk ru
- Ivan Samburov ru
- Sergey Samkov ru
- Vasily Samovarov ru
- Ivan Samodeev ru
- Niktor Samodelkin ru
- Aleksandr Samoylov ru
- Dmitry Samoylov
- Ivan Arsenevich Samoylov ru
- Ivan Mikhailovich Samoylov ru
- Grigory Samoylovich ru
- Nikolai Samorodov ru
- Sergey Samorodov ru
- Aleksandr Samofalov ru
- Aleksandr Samokhvalov ru
- Iosif Samokhvalov ru
- Mikhail Samokhvalov ru
- Nikolai Samokhvalov ru
- Fyodor Samokhvalov ru
- Anatoly Samokhin ru
- Ivan Samokhin ru
- Mikhail Samokhin ru
- Nikolai Samokhin ru
- Pavel Samokhin ru
- Pyotr Filatovich Samokhin ru
- Pyotr Yakovlevich Samokhin ru
- Anatoly Samochkin ru
- Boris Samsonov ru
- Vladimir Andreevich Samsonov ru
- Vladimir Sergeevich Samsonov ru
- Ivan Samsonov ru
- Konstantin Samsonov ru
- Pavel Samsonov ru
- Stanislav Samsonov ru
- Zinaida Samsonova
- Vilis Samsons ru
- Andrey Samusev ru
- Nikolai Samusev ru
- Grigory Samkharadze ru
- Mikhail Sanachyov ru
- Vladimir Sandalov ru
- Nikolai Sandzhirov ru
- Yevgeny Saneev ru
- Mikhail Sannikov ru
- Stepan Sannikov ru
- Fyodor Sannikov ru
- Olga Sanfirova
- Fyodor Sanchirov ru
- Ivan Sanko ru
- Ivan Sankov ru
- Ivan Sapalyov ru
- Fyodor Sapatinsky ru
- Ivan Sapelkin ru
- Abram Sapozhnikov ru
- Aleksey Sapozhnikov ru
- Vladimir Sapozhnikov ru
- Mikhail Aleksandrovich Sapozhnikov ru
- Mikhail Grigorievich Sapozhnikov ru
- Ivan Saponenko ru
- Vladimir Saprykin
- Boris Sapunkov ru
- Aleksey Sapunov ru
- Nikolai Sapunov ru
- Nikolai Sapaev ru
- Ivan Sarana ru
- Mikhail Sarancha ru
- Nikolai Saranchyov ru
- Gennady Sarafanov
- Ishkhan Saribekyan ru
- Armais Sarkisov ru
- Fyodor Sarkisov ru
- Vasily Sarkisyan ru
- Suren Sarkisyan ru
- Sergey Sarkhoshev ru
- Aleksandr Sarygin ru
- Fyodor Sarychev ru
- Aram Safarov ru
- Faris Safarov
- Nakip Safin ru
- Nurulla Safin ru
- Gany Safiullin ru
- Anatoly Safonov ru
- Boris Safonov (twice)
- Vladimir Safonov ru
- Georgy Safonov ru
- Ilya Safonov ru
- Fyodor Safonov ru
- Andrey Safronov ru
- Pyotr Safronov ru
- Sergey Safronov
- Timofey Safronov ru
- Fyodor Safronov ru
- Valentina Safronova
- Pavel Sakharov ru
- Mikhail Sakhnenko ru
- Iosif Sachko ru
- Mikhail Sachkov ru
- Yemelyan Sayapin ru
- Andrey Sbitnev ru
- Ilya Svezhentsev ru
- Grigory Sverdlikov ru
- Abram Sverdlov ru
- Aleksey Svertilov ru
- Georgy Svetachev ru
- Grigory Grigorievich Svetetsky ru
- Grigory Lavrentevich Svetetsky ru
- Timofey Svetlichny ru
- Aleksandr Svechkaryov ru
- Ivan Svechkaryov ru
- Pavel Svechnikov ru
- Aleksandr Svidersky ru
- Savely Svidersky ru
- Vladimir Svidersky ru
- Iosif Svidersky ru
- Nikolai Svinarchuk ru
- Afanasy Svinar ru
- Pavel Svirepkin ru
- Aleksandr Sviridov ru
- Aleksey Sviridov ru
- Karp Sviridov
- Nikolai Sviridov ru
- Anatoly Sviridovsky ru
- Vladimir Svirchevsky ru
- Pavel Svistov ru
- Anatoly Svistunov ru
- Andrey Svistunov ru
- Nikolai Svitenko ru
- Ludvík Svoboda
- Leonid Svyatoshenko ru
- Yuri Svyashchenko ru
- Grigory Sgibnev ru
- Pyotr Sgibnev ru
- Aleksandr Shabalin (twice)
- Boris Shabalin ru
- Vladimir Shabalin ru
- Boris Shaban ru
- Kazimir Shaban ru
- Vasily Shabanov ru
- Ivan Shabanov ru
- Fyodor Shabashov ru
- Viktor Shabelnik ru
- Ivan Shabelnikov ru
- Ivan Shabunin ru
- Valentin Shaburov ru
- Yegor Shavkunov ru
- Pyotr Shavurin ru
- Fairt Shagaleyev ru
- Anatoly Shagalov ru
- Galimzyan Shagvaleyev ru
- Abdulla Shagiev ru
- Gennady Shadrin ru
- Ivan Shadrin ru
- Shadi Shaimov ru
- Pavel Shaykin ru
- Zaky Shaymardanov ru
- Gimay Shaykhutdinov ru
- Kenzhibek Shakenov ru
- Astanakul Shakirov ru
- Sadu Shakirov ru
- Ulmas Shakirov ru
- Pyotr Shakurin ru
- Yakov Shakurov ru
- Fyodor Shakushev ru
- Valdemar Shalandin ru
- Nikolai Shalashkov ru
- Mikhail Shalzhiyan ru
- Aleksey Shalimov ru
- Vasily Shalimov ru
- Vladimir Yegorovich Shalimov
- Vladimir Fyodorovich Shalimov ru
- Nikolai Shalimov ru
- Sergey Shalygin ru
- Pavel Ivanovich Shamaev ru
- Pavel Stepanovich Shamaev ru
- Ivan Shamanov ru
- Anatoly Shamansky ru
- Pavel Shamardin ru
- Fattakh Shamgulov ru
- Ivan Shamenkov ru
- Akram Shamkaev ru
- Mikhail Shamray ru
- Gali Shamsutdinov ru
- Daniil Shamura ru
- Nikolai Shamshik ru
- Anatoly Shamshur ru
- Aleksandr Shamshurin ru
- Vasily Shamshurin ru
- Prokopy Shanaurin ru
- Idel Shandalov ru
- Vladimir Shandula ru
- Grigory Shapar ru
- Valentin Shapiro ru
- Nikolai Vasilyevich Shapkin ru
- Nikolai Pavlovich Shapkin ru
- Vasily Shapoval ru
- Grigory Shapoval ru
- Semyon Shapovalenko ru
- Aleksandr Shapovalov ru
- Afanasy Shapovalov ru
- Yevgeny Shapovalov
- Ivan Shapovalov ru
- Nikolai Shapovalov ru
- Ivan Shapochka ru
- Mikhail Shapochkin ru
- Aleksandr Shaposhnikov ru
- Vladimir Shaposhnikov ru
- Matvey Shaposhnikov
- Yakov Shaposhnikov ru
- Ivan Shapshaev ru
- Nikolai Sharabarin ru
- Vladimir Sharapa ru
- Igor Shardakov ru
- Vasily Denisovich Sharenko ru
- Vasily Sharpenko ru
- Aleksandr Sharikov ru
- Nikolai Sharikov ru
- Irgash Sharipov ru
- Ismat Sharipov ru
- Nurmy Sharipov ru
- Fatyh Sharipov
- Nikolai Sharko ru
- Aleksey Sharkov ru
- Valentin Sharkov ru
- Rakesh Sharma
- Aleksandr Sharpov ru
- Aleksey Sharpov ru
- Vasily Sharpov ru
- Dmitry Sharpov ru
- Ivan Sharpov ru
- Markel Sharpov ru
- Nikolai Sharpov ru
- Pavel Sharpov ru
- Boris Sharonov ru
- Mikhail Sharonov ru
- Fyodor Sharonov ru
- Mikhail Sharokhin
- Pyotr Sharpilo ru
- Nikolai Sharuev ru
- Abram Shrypov ru
- Nikolai Sharypov ru
- Nikolai Shataev ru
- Sleksey Shatalin ru
- Ivan Shatalin ru
- Aleksandr Shatalkin ru
- Vladimir Shatalov (twice)
- Kim Shatilo ru
- Mikhail Shatilo ru
- Vasily Shatilov
- Gennady Shatin ru
- Mikhail Shatov ru
- Afanasy Shatokhin ru
- Ivan Shatokhin ru
- Viktor Shatrov ru
- Nikolai Shatrov ru
- Fyodor Shatrov ru
- Ivan Shaumyan ru
- Pyotr Shafranov
- Aleksandr Shafrov ru
- Andrey Shakhvorostov ru
- Sergey Shakhvorostov ru
- Semyon Shakhmatov ru
- Moisey Shakhnovich ru
- Andrey Shakhov ru
- Mikhail Shakhovtsev ru
- Ernst Shakht
- Vasily Shatskikh ru
- Nikolai Shashkin ru
- Viktor Shashkov ru
- German Shashkov ru
- Timofey Shashlo ru
- Yakov Shashlov ru
- Moisey Shvartsman ru
- Yakov Shvachko ru
- Vasily Shvets ru
- Ivan Shvets ru
- Stepan Shvets ru
- Ulyan Shvets ru
- Ivan Shvetsov ru
- Stepan Shvetsov ru
- Pavel Shvydkoy ru
- Andrey Shebalkov
- Fyodor Shebanov
- Anton Shevelyov ru
- Viktor Shevelyov ru
- Mark Shevelyov
- Nikolai Artamonovich Shevelyov ru
- Nikolai Semyonovich Shevelyov ru
- Pavel Shevelyov ru
- Pyotr Shevelyov ru
- Sergey Shevelyov ru
- Demid Shevenok ru
- Nikolai Sheverdyaev ru
- Anatoly Shevkunov ru
- Nikolai Shevlyakov ru
- Aleksandr Shevtsov ru
- Vasily Shevtsov ru
- Georgy Shevtsov ru
- Ivan Shevtsov ru
- Pyotr Shevtsov ru
- Lyubov Shevtsova
- Aleksandr Yevseyevich Shevchenko ru
- Aleksandr Iosifovich Shevchenko ru
- Andrey Shevchenko ru
- Boris Shevchenko ru
- Vladimir Shevchenko ru
- Grigory Ivanovich Shevchenko ru
- Grigory Markovich Shevchenko ru
- Grigory Mefodievich Shevchenko ru
- Ivan Grigorievich Shevchenko ru
- Ivan Markovich Shevchenko ru
- Mefody Shevchenko ru
- Mikhail Nikitovich Shevchenko ru
- Mikhail Stepanovich Shevchenko ru
- Nikolai Shevchenko ru
- Pyotr Grigorievich Shevchenko ru
- Pyotr Lavrentevich Shevchenko ru
- Valentin Shevchuk ru
- Vasily Shevchuk ru
- Grigory Shevchuk ru
- Fyodor Shevchuk ru
- Aleksandr Shevyryov ru
- Valentin Shevyrin ru
- Ivan Shein ru
- Pavel Shein ru
- Ivan Sheykin ru
- Mikhail Sheykin ru
- Boris Sheiko ru
- Stasis Sheinauskas ru
- Anton Shelaev ru
- Aleksandr Shelepen ru
- Pyotr Shelepov
- Vasily Galaktionovich Shelest ru
- Vasily Mitrofanovich Shelest ru
- Dennis Shelest ru
- Nikolai Shelikhov ru
- Nikolai Shelkovnikov ru
- Sergey Shelkovy ru
- Nikolai Shelomtsev ru
- Nikolai Shelukhin ru
- Grigory Shelushkov ru
- Fyodor Shelshakov ru
- Pyotr Shemendyuk ru
- Afanasy Shemenkov ru
- Aleksey Shemigon ru
- Grigory Shemyakin ru
- Georgy Shemgeliya ru
- Ivan Shengur ru
- Nikolai Shendrikov ru
- Nikolai Shentsov ru
- Vasily Shenshakov ru
- Georgy Shepelev ru
- Nikolai Gavrilovich Shepelev ru
- Nikolai Shepelev ru
- Ivan Shepel ru
- Ivan Shepetkov ru
- Ivan Shepetov
- Pyotr Sheredegin ru
- Ivan Sheremet ru
- Leonid Sheronov ru
- Vladimir Sherstnyov ru
- Nikolai Sherstobitov ru
- Nikolai Sherstov ru
- Sergey Shershavin ru
- Aleksey Shestakov ru
- Arkhip Shestakov ru
- Konstantin Shestakov ru
- Lev Shestakov
- Maksim Shestakov ru
- Mikhail Shestakov ru
- Boris Shesternin ru
- Boris Shekhriev ru
- Aleksey Shibaev ru
- Mikhail Shibaev ru
- Vasily Shibankov ru
- Viktor Shibankov ru
- Grigory Shibanov ru
- Andrey Shigaev ru
- Grigory Shigaev ru
- Nikolai Shikin ru
- Yuri Shikov ru
- Ivan Shikunov ru
- Nikolai Shikunov ru
- Pavel Shikunov ru
- Nikolai Shilenkov ru
- Afanasy Shilin (twice)
- Mikhail Shilkin ru
- Anfilofy Shilkov ru
- Georgy Shilo ru
- Mikhail Shilo ru
- Aleksandr Shilov ru
- Grigory Shilov ru
- Mikhail Shilov ru
- Pyotr Shilov ru
- Semyon Shilov ru
- Sergey Shilov ru
- Leonid Shilovsky ru
- Pyotr Shildin ru
- Mikhail Shilnikov ru
- Ivan Shilnov ru
- Fyodor Shilyaev ru
- Grigory Shimko ru
- Daniil Shingiry ru
- Aron Sinder ru
- Nikolai Shindikov ru
- Fyodor Shinkarenko ru
- Panteley Shin ru
- Vasily Shipilov ru
- Yakov Shipilov ru
- Vasily Shipitsyn ru
- Mikhail Siritsyn ru
- Aleksandr Shipov ru
- Andrefy Shipulin ru
- Mikhail Shirikov ru
- Valentin Shirokikh ru
- Pyotr Shirokov ru
- Pyotr Shironin ru
- Pyotr Shirshov
- Vsevolod Shiryaev ru
- Pavel Shiryaev ru
- Pyotr Shisterov ru
- Ivan Shitikov ru
- Vasily Shitov ru
- Pavel Shitov ru
- Aleksandr Shikharev ru
- Aleksandr Sikhov ru
- Pavel Shikov ru
- Vasily Shishigin ru
- Abibo Shishinashvili ru
- Ilua Shishkan ru
- Aleksandr Ivanovich Shishkin ru
- Aleksandr Pavlovich Shishkin ru
- Valery Shishkin ru
- Vasily Ivanovich Shishkin ru
- Vasily Mikhailovich Shishkin ru
- Ivan Shishkin ru
- Mikhail Shishkin ru
- Nikolai Shishkin ru
- Pavel Shishkin ru
- Yakov Shishkin ru
- Viktor Shishkov ru
- Daniil Shishkov ru
- Mikhail Shishkov ru
- Viktor Shishlyannikov ru
- Ilya Shishmakov ru
- Vladimir Shishov ru
- Leonid Shishov ru
- Ivan Shishunov ru
- Georgy Shiyanov ru
- Ivan Shiyanov ru
- Ivan Shkadov ru
- Vladimir Shkapenko ru
- Mariya Shkarletova
- Konstantin Shkaruba ru
- Ivan Shkatov ru
- Grigory Shkenyov ru
- Vasily Shkil ru
- Fyodor Skiryov ru
- Pyotr Shkodin ru
- Dmitry Shkonda ru
- Timofey Shkrylyov ru
- Aleksey Shkulepov ru
- Nikolai Shkulipa ru
- Mikhail Shkunov ru
- Mikhail Shkurakov ru
- Dmitry Shkurat ru
- Yevgeny Shkurdalov ru
- Vasily Shkurin ru
- Makar Shkurko ru
- Roman Shkurko ru
- Ivan Shlyomin
- Nikolai Shlemov ru
- Viktor Shlepov ru
- Pyotr Shlyuykov ru
- Nikolai Shlyaev ru
- Ivan Shlyakov ru
- Gennady Shlyapin ru
- Aleksey Shlyakhtich ru
- Pyotr Shlyakhturov ru
- Anatoly Shmakov ru
- Vasily Shmakov ru
- Grigory Shmarovoz ru
- Maksim Shmatov
- Pyotr Shmatukha ru
- Boris Shmelyov ru
- Ilya Shmelyov
- Nikolai Shmelyov ru
- Nikolai Shmelkov ru
- Fritz Shmenkel
- Pyotr Shimgol ru
- Otto Shmidt
- Smitry Shmonin ru
- Nikolai Shmorgun ru
- Boris Shmotov ru
- Ivan Shmyg ru
- Arkady Shmygun ru
- Minay Shmyryov
- Fyodor Shmyrin ru
- Mikhail Shneyderman ru
- Aleksandr Shokurov ru
- Dmitry Sholokhov ru
- Nikifor Sholudenko ru
- Aleksandr Shomin ru
- Georgy Shonin
- Aleksandr Shopin ru
- Boris Shopin ru
- Duyshenkul Shopokov ru
- Aleksandr Shornikov ru
- Vasily Shornikov ru
- Nikolai Shornikov ru
- Grigory Shostatsky ru
- Nikolai Shokhin ru
- Vladimir Shoshin ru
- Vasily Shpagin ru
- Kuzma Shpak ru
- Pyotr Shpak ru
- Sergey Shpakovsky ru
- Pavel Shpetny ru
- Ivan Shpigunov ru
- Pavel Shpilko ru
- Grigory Shpilkov ru
- Sergey Shpunyakov ru
- Yakov Shtanev ru
- Stepan Shtanko ru
- Filipp Shtanko ru
- Dmitry Shtelmakh ru
- Aleksandr Shtepenko ru
- Grigory Shtern
- Grigory Shtonda ru
- Viktor Shtrigol ru
- Matevy Shtryakin ru
- Aleksey Shubin ru
- Andrey Shubin ru
- Vasily Shubin ru
- Aleksandr Shubinkov ru
- Aleksandr Shuvaev ru
- Konstantin Shuvalov ru
- Nikolai Shuvalov ru
- Sergey Shuvalov ru
- Vasily Shugayev
- Ilya Shuklin ru
- Akhmedzhan ru
- Shirin Shukurov
- Konstantin Shulaev ru
- Gennady Shulepov ru
- Vasily Shulga ru
- Semyon Shulga ru
- Aleksandr Shulgin ru
- Boris Shulgin ru
- Leonid Shulzhenko ru
- Nikolai Shulzhenko ru
- Mikhail Shults ru
- Vasily Shulyatikov ru
- Aleksey Shumavtsov ru
- Georgy Shumakov ru
- Zakhar Shumakov ru
- Yakov Shumakov ru
- Avksenty Shumeyko ru
- Grigory Shumeyko ru
- Nikolai Shumeyko ru
- Pyotr Shumeyko ru
- Aleksandr Shumelyov ru
- Ivan Shumilikhin ru
- Anatoly Shumilov ru
- Ivan Shumilov ru
- Mikhail Shumilov
- Vasily Shumikhin ru
- Grigory Shumkov ru
- Pyotr Shumov ru
- Aleksey Shumsky ru
- Konstantin Shumsky ru
- Fyodor Shuneyev ru
- Grigory Shupik ru
- Kalmanis Shuras ru
- Shota Shurgaya ru
- Dmitry Shurpenko ru
- Afanasy Shurupov ru
- Pavel Shurukhin (twice)
- Mikhail Shustov ru
- Terenty Shutilov ru
- Aleksey Shutov ru
- Viktor Shutov ru
- Pyotr Vasilyevich Shutov ru
- Pyotr Ivanovich Shutov ru
- Semyon Shutov ru
- Stepan Shutov (twice)
- Nikolai Shutt ru
- Yegor Shutko ru
- Ivan Shushin ru
- Ivan Shchabelsky ru
- Vasily Shchadin ru
- Boris Shchapov ru
- Aleksandr Shcheblakov ru
- Afanasy Shcheglov ru
- Ivan Shcheglov ru
- Stepan Shcheglov ru
- Vladimir Shchegolyov ru
- Grigory Shchedrin
- Pyotr Shchedrov ru
- Grigory Shchekotov ru
- Sergey Shchelkanov ru
- Vasily Shchelkunov ru
- Nikolai Shchemelyov ru
- Mikhail Shchenikov ru
- Aleksey Shchepkin ru
- Aleksandr Vasilyevich Shcherbak ru
- Aleksandr Mikhailovich Shcherbak ru
- Anatoly Shcherbak ru
- Aleksandr Aleksandrovich Shcherbakov ru
- Aleksandr Pavlovich Shcherbakov ru
- Aleksandr Fyodorovich Shcherbakov ru
- Aleksey Shcherbakov ru
- Arsenty Shcherbakov ru
- Vasily Vasilyevich Shcherbakov ru
- Vasily Kirillovich Shcherbakov ru
- Vasily Samuilovich Shcherbakov ru
- Viktor Shcherbakov ru
- Ivan Shcherbakov ru
- Nikolai Shcherbakov ru
- Oleg Shcherbakov ru
- Pavel Shcherbakov ru
- Pyotr Shcherbakov ru
- Sergey Shcherbakov ru
- Yakov Shcherbakov ru
- Timofey Shcherbanyov ru
- Afanasy Shcherban ru
- Mariya Shcherbachenko
- Dmitry Shcherbin ru
- Vasily Vasilyevich Shcherbina ru
- Vasily Illarionovich Shcherbina ru
- Ivan Shcherbina ru
- Nikolai Gavrilovich Shcherbina ru
- Nikolai Semyonovich Shcherbina ru
- Vladimir Shcherbinin ru
- Fedot Shcherbinin ru
- Pavel Shcherbinko ru
- Vasily Shchetinin ru
- Grigory Shchetinin ru
- Nikolai Shchetinin
- Dmitry Shchetsura ru
- Ivan Shchipakin ru
- Nikolai Shchipanov ru
- Ivan Shchipun ru
- Sergey Shchirov ru
- Andrey Shchukin ru
- Ivan Shchukin ru
- Lev Shchukin
- Nikolai Shchukin ru
- Feodosy Shchur ru
- Aleksandr Shchurikhin ru
- Nikolai Sdobnov ru
- Irina Sebrova
- Aleksey Sevastyanov ru
- Vitaly Sevastyanov (twice)
- Ivan Severin ru
- Moisevy Severin ru
- Timofey Severov ru
- Ivan Severyanov ru
- Ivan Sevostyanov ru
- Pavel Sevostyanov ru
- Sergey Sevostyanov ru
- Ivan Sevrikov ru
- Viktor Sevrin ru
- Aleksey Sevryukov ru
- Leonid Sevryukov ru
- Nikolai Sevryukov ru
- Pyotr Sedelnikov ru
- Timofey Sedenkov ru
- Sergey Sednev ru
- Nikolai Sednenkov ru
- Gennady Sedov ru
- Grigory Sedov ru
- Ivan Vasilyevich Sedov ru
- Ivan Viktorovich Sedov ru
- Konstantin Sedov ru
- Leonid Sedov ru
- Sergey Sedkevich ru
- Aleksandr Sedunov ru
- Ivan Sedykh ru
- Seyitnafe Seyitveliyev
- Vladimir Sekin ru
- Ivan Seledtsov ru
- Anatoly Seleznyov ru
- Mikhail Seleznyov ru
- Nikolai Illarionovich Seleznyov ru
- Nikolai Pavlovich Seleznyov ru
- Pyotr Seleznyov ru
- Fyodor Seleznyov ru
- Yevgraf Selivanov ru
- Ivan Selivanov ru
- Pyotr Selivanov ru
- Fyodor Selivantev ru
- Ivan Seliverstov ru
- Kuzma Yegorovich ru
- Fyodor Seliverstov ru
- Andrey Selifonov ru
- Ivan Selifonov ru
- Ivan Selitsky ru
- Nikolai Selitsky ru
- Vasily Selishchev ru
- Timofey Selishchev ru
- Mikhail Selgikov ru
- Semyon Selsky ru
- Arkady Selyutin ru
- Ivan Selyagin ru
- Yevgeny Selyanin ru
- Nikolai Semak ru
- Pavel Semak ru
- Afanasy Semakin ru
- Nikolai Semeyko (twice)
- Vladimir Semenishin ru
- Aleksandr Ivanovich Semyonov ru
- Aleksandr Fyodorovich Semyonov ru
- Aleksandr Yakovlevich Semyonov ru
- Andrey Daniilovich Semyonov ru
- Andrey Platonovich Semyonov ru
- Boris Semyonov ru
- Vladimir Kuzmich Semyonov ru
- Vladimir Fyodorovich Semyonov ru
- Dmitry Ivanovich Semyonov (sergeant) ru
- Dmitry Ivanovich Semyonov (major) ru
- Ivan Dmitrievich Semyonov ru
- Ivan Ilyich Semyonov ru
- Nikolai Semyonov ru
- Pavel Semyonov ru
- Pyotr Semyonov ru
- Stepan Semyonov ru
- Fyodor Semyonov ru
- Mikhail Sementsov ru
- Vasily Smenchenko ru
- Kuzma Cemenchenko ru
- Zakhar Semenyuk ru
- Ivan Semenyuk ru
- Pavel Semenyako ru
- Andrey Semernikov ru
- Fyodor Semiglazov ru
- Aleksandr Semikov ru
- Sergey Syomin ru
- Aleksandr Smiradsky ru
- Yakov Semchenko ru
- Ivan Senagin ru
- Vasily Senator ru
- Aleksandr Senatorov
- Grigory Senatosenko ru
- Musabek Sengirbaev ru
- Nikolai Sentyukov ru
- Vladimir Sentyurin ru
- Vladimir Senchenko ru
- Fyodor Senchenko ru
- Prokofy Senchikhin ru
- Vasily Senko (twice)
- Tit Senkov ru
- Viktor Senyushenkov ru
- Fyodor Serbin ru
- Nikolai Serbinenko ru
- Vladimir Serbulov ru
- Aleksandr Terentevich Sergeev ru
- Aleksandr Timofeevich Sergeev ru
- Aleksey Sergeev ru
- Anatoly Sergeev ru
- Vasily Dmitrievich Sergeev ru
- Vasily Pavlovich Sergeev ru
- Vladimir Sergeev ru
- Vsevold Sergeev ru
- Dmitry Sergeev ru
- Ivan Ivanovich Sergeev ru
- Ivan Nikolaevich Sergeev ru
- Ivan Fyodorovich Sergeev ru
- Leonid Sergeev ru
- Mikhail Sergeev ru
- Nikolai Sergeev ru
- Pyotr Yegorovich Sergeev ru
- Pyotr Petrovich Sergeev ru
- Sergey Sergeev ru
- Yuri Sergeev ru
- Nikolai Sergeenkov ru
- Vasily Sergienko ru
- Ivan Sergienko ru
- Nikolai Dmitrievich Sergienko ru
- Nikolai Yegorovich Sergienko ru
- Dmitry Sergienkov ru
- Aleksey Sergov ru
- Ivan Segrunin ru
- Semyon Serditov ru
- Grigory Serdyuk ru
- Iosif Serdyukov ru
- Nikolai Serdyukov ru
- Semyon Serdyukov ru
- Aleksandr Serebrov
- Andrey Serebryakov ru
- Nikolai Serebryakov ru
- Fyodor Serebryakov ru
- Aleksandr Serebryannikov ru
- Seryogin ru
- Vasily Seryogin ru
- Vladimir Seryogin
- Ivan Mikhailovich Sereda ru
- Ivan Pavlovich Sereda ru
- Igor Sereda ru
- Konstantin Sereda ru
- Pyotr Sereda ru
- Aleksandr Seredenko ru
- Vladimir Seredin ru
- Fyodor Seredin ru
- Yevgeny Seryodkin ru
- Aleksandr Seryozhnikov ru
- Ivan Serzhantov ru
- Vasily Serikov ru
- Ivan Konstantinovich Serikov ru
- Ivan Pavlovich Serikov ru
- Andrey Serkov ru
- Ivan Serkov ru
- Anatoly Serov
- Vladimir Serov
- Georgy Serov ru
- Ilya Serov ru
- Konstantin Serov ru
- Mikhail Serov ru
- Nikolai Serov ru
- Vasily Serogodsky ru
- Mikhail Serogodsky ru
- Iosif Serpep ru
- Grigory Serykh ru
- Semyon Serykh ru
- Pyotr Seryakov ru
- Aleksandr Sechkin ru
- Nikolai Sechkin ru
- Samand Siabandov
- Lutfulla Sibagatullin ru
- Semyon Sibirin ru
- Pyotr Sibirkin ru
- Aleksey Sibiryakov ru
- Ivan Sivakov
- Vasily Sivachenko ru
- Ivan Sivko ru
- Vadim Sivkov ru
- Grigory Sivkov (twice)
- Ivan Sivolap ru
- Pavel Sivolapenko ru
- Ivan Sivryuk ru
- Nikolai Sivtsov ru
- Nikolai Sigaev ru
- Dmitry Sigakov ru
- Vasily Sigov ru
- Dmitry Sigov ru
- Vasily Sidelnikov ru
- Parmeny Sidelnikov ru
- Boris Sidnev ru
- Aleksandr Sidorenko ru
- Boris Sidorenko ru
- Vasily Sidorenko ru
- Grigory Sidorenko ru
- Ivan Ilyich Sidorenko ru
- Ivan Mikhailovich Sidorenko
- Ivan Petrovich Sidorenko ru
- Mark Sidorenko ru
- Pyotr Sidorenko ru
- Rostislav Sidorenko ru
- Semyon Sidorenko ru
- Vasily Sidorenkov ru
- Aleksandr Sidorin ru
- VAsily Sidorin ru
- Aleksey Sidorishin ru
- Semyon Sidorkov ru
- Aleksandr Vasilyevich Sidorov ru
- Aleksandr Ivanovich Sidorov ru
- Vasily Sidorov ru
- Veniamin Sidorov ru
- Georgy Sidorov ru
- Dmitry Pavlovich Sidorov ru
- Dmitry Stepanovich Sidorov ru
- Ivan Dmitrievich Sidorov ru
- Ivan Zakharovich Sidorov ru
- Ivan Prokhorovich Sidorov ru
- Nikolai Grigorievich Sidorov ru
- Nikolai Ivanovich Sidorov ru
- Pavel Ivanovich Sidorov ru
- Pavel Nikitovich Sidorov ru
- Pyotr Sidorov ru
- Aleksandr Sidorovich ru
- Aleksey Sidyukov ru
- Vasily Sidyakin ru
- Ivan Sizintsev ru
- Boris Sizov ru
- Vasily Sizov ru
- Pyotr Sizov ru
- Nikolai Sikorsky ru
- Sergey Sikorsky ru
- Stepan Sikorsky ru
- Ivan Nikolaevich Silaev ru
- Ivan Sergeevich Silaev ru
- Aleksandr Silantev ru
- Ivan Silantev ru
- Mikhail Vasilyevich Silantev ru
- Mikhail Nikolaevich Silantev ru
- Nikolai Silantev ru
- Nikolai Silin ru
- Grigory Silkin ru
- Mikhail Silnitsky ru
- Ivan Simakov ru
- Timofey Simakov ru
- Fyodor Simakov ru
- Grigory Simankin ru
- Aleksandr Simanov ru
- Viktor Simanchuk ru
- Vasily Simbirtsev ru
- Nikolai Siminikhin ru
- Vasily Simon ru
- Aleksandr Simonenko ru
- Aleksey Simonenko ru
- Nikolai Dmitrievich Simonenko ru
- Nikolai Ivanovich Simonenko ru
- Nikolai Nikolaevich Simonenko ru
- Mikhail Simonov ru
- Vladimir Simonok ru
- Nikolai Simoniak
- Karapet Simonyan ru
- Semyon Singaevsky ru
- Nikolai Sindryakov ru
- Yakov Sinyov ru
- Viktor Sinelnikov ru
- Mikhail Sinelnikov ru
- Pyotr Sinelnikov ru
- Dmitry Sinenkov ru
- Valery Sinilnikov ru
- Viktor Sinitsky ru
- Aleksandr Nikolaevich Sinitsyn ru
- Aleksandr Pavlovich Sinitsyn ru
- Vasily Sinitsyn ru
- Daniil Sinitsyn ru
- Nikita Sinitsyn ru
- Fyodor Sinitsyn ru
- Fyodor Sinichkin ru
- Anatoly Sinnikov ru
- Vasily Sinchuk ru
- Pyotr Sinchukov ru
- Nikhail Sinko ru
- Anatoly Sinkov ru
- Sergey Sinkov ru
- Nikolai Sinyutin ru
- Fyodor Sinyavin ru
- Mikhail Sipovich ru
- Nikolai Sipyagin ru
- Pavel Siragov ru
- Ivan Sirenko ru
- Dmitry Sirik ru
- Nikolai Sirin ru
- Nikolsi Sirichenko ru
- Aleksey Sirotin ru
- Vitkor Sirotin ru
- Vyacheslav Sirotin ru
- Nikolai Sirotin ru
- Vasily Sirotinkin ru
- Anatoly Sirotkin ru
- Fyodor Sirotkin ru
- Yuri Sirotkin ru
- Sergey Sirotyuk ru
- Fyodor Siseykin ru
- Kasim Sitdikov ru
- Aleksandr Sitkovsky ru
- Grigory Sitnik ru
- Aleksey Sitnikov ru
- Vasily Yegorovich Sitnikov ru
- Vasily Petrovich Sitnikov ru
- Veniamin Sitnikov ru
- Nikolai Sitnikov ru
- Pyotr Sitnikov ru
- Valentin Sitnov ru
- Esmurat Sikhimov ru
- Pyotr Sikhno ru
- Mikhail Siyanin ru
- Mikhail Chelombitko ru
- Pavel Skalatsky ru
- Vasily Skachkov ru
- Viktor Skachkov ru
- Konstantin Skachkov ru
- Nikolai Skachkov ru
- Aleksandr Vasilyevich Skvortsov ru
- Aleksandr Yegorovich Skvortsov ru
- Andrey Skvortsov ru
- Grigory Skvortsov ru
- Dmitry Skvortsov ru
- Ivan Skvortsov ru
- Kirill Skvortsov ru
- Nikolai Skvortsov ru
- Grigory Skiruta
- Boris Skityba ru
- Georgy Skleznyov ru
- Grigory Anikeevich Sklyar ru
- Grigory Mikhailovich Sklyar ru
- Anatoly Sklyarov ru
- Ivan Andreevich Sklyarov ru
- Ivan Grigorievich Sklyarov ru
- Maksim Sklyarov ru
- Aleksandr Sknaryov ru
- Vitt Skobarikhin ru
- Ivan Skobelev ru
- Aleksandr Skokov ru
- Ivan Skokov ru
- Pavel Skomorokha ru
- Nikolai Skomorokhov (twice)
- Vasily Skopenko ru
- Pavel Skopin ru
- Sergey Skornyakov ru
- Anatoly Skorobogatov ru
- Ivan Skory ru
- Vladimir Skorynin ru
- Fyodor Skoryatin ru
- Aleksandr Skochilov ru
- Mikhail Skripin ru
- Georgy Skripnikov ru
- Vujenty Skryganov ru
- Aleksey Skrylyov ru
- Viktor Skrylyov ru
- Pavel Skrynnikov ru
- Stepan Skrynnikov ru
- Vasily Skrynko ru
- Konstantin Skrytnikov ru
- Vasily Skryabin ru
- Viktor Skryabin ru
- Vladimir Skugar ru
- Ivan Skuridin ru
- Yakov Skusnichenko ru
- Georgy Arsentevich ru
- Pyotr Slabinyuk ru
- Georgy Slavgorodsky ru
- Ivan Slavyansky ru
- Vasily Slastin ru
- Aleksey Slastikhin ru
- Dmitry Slashchov ru
- Aleksey Slepanov ru
- Konstantin Slepanchuk ru
- Yakov Slepenkov ru
- Mavriky Slepnyov
- Anton Slivka ru
- Leonty Silzen ru
- Anton Slits ru
- Grigory Slovodenyuk ru
- Ivan Slovodenyuk ru
- Vasily Slobodzyan ru
- Aleksey Slobodchikov ru
- Mitrofan Slobodyan ru
- Mikhail Slovotskov ru
- Aleksandr Slovnov ru
- Yevstafy Slonsky ru
- Vitaly Slyunkin ru
- Mitrofan Slyusarev ru
- Sidor Slyusarev
- Zakhar Slyusarenko (twice)
- Albert Slyusar ru
- Leonty Smavzyuk ru
- Viktor Smaznov ru
- Aleksandr Smelov ru
- Vladimir Smetanin ru
- Grigory Smetanin ru
- Mikhail Smetanin ru
- Yakov Smetnyov ru
- Mikhail Simlsky ru
- Aleksandr Fyodorivich Smirnov ru
- Aleksandr Yakovlevich Smirnov ru
- Aleksey Yefimovich Smirnov ru
- Aleksey Panteleevich Smirnov ru
- Aleksey Semyonovich Smirnov (twice)
- Anatoly Vasilyevich Smirnov ru
- Arkady Smirnov ru
- Boris Aleksandrovich Smirnov (artilleryist) ru
- Boris Aleksandrovich Smirnov (pilot) ru
- Vasily Alekseevich Smirnov ru
- Vasily Ivanovich Smirnov ru
- Viktor Petrovich Smirnov ru
- Vitaly Smirnov ru
- Vladimir Antonovich Smirnov ru
- Vladimir Vasilyevich Smirnov ru
- Vladimir Yefimovich Smirnov ru
- Vyacheslav Smirnov ru
- Grigory Smirnov ru
- Dmitry Ivanovich Smirnov (general) ru
- Dmitry Ivanovich Smirnov (colonel) ru
- Dmitry Mikhailovich Smirnov ru
- Dmitry Nikolaevich Smirnov ru
- Ivan Mikhailovich Smirnov ru
- Ivan Fyodorovich Smirnov ru
- Klavdy Smirnov ru
- Konstantin Aleksandrovich Smirnov ru
- Konstantin Grigorievich Smirnov ru
- Mikhail Smirnov ru
- Nikolai Aleksandrovich Smirnov ru
- Nikolai Andreevich Smirnov (colonel) ru
- Nikolai Andreevich Smirnov (sergeant) ru
- Nikolai Ivanovich Smirnov
- Nikolai Fyodorovich Smirnov ru
- Nikolai Frolovich Smirnov ru
- Nikolai Yakovlevich Smirnov ru
- Oleg Smirnov ru
- Pavel Smirnov ru
- Sergey Grigorievich Smirnov ru
- Sergey Ivanovich Smirnov ru
- Fyodor Smirnov ru
- Yuri Smirnov ru
- Mariya Smirnova
- Leonid Smirnykh ru
- Roman Smishchuk ru
- Sergey Smolensky ru
- Aleksandr Smolin ru
- Abram Smolyakov ru
- Ivan Smolyakov ru
- Vasily Smolyanykh ru
- Feodosy Smolyachkov ru
- Aleksandr Smorchkov
- Nikita Smorchkov ru
- Yakov Smushkevich (twice)
- Afanasy Smyshlyaev ru
- Vasily Snagoshchenko ru
- Vladimir Snesaryov ru
- Ivan Snitko ru
- Amayak Snoplyan ru
- Vasily Sobina ru
- Ivan Sobko ru
- Mikhail Sobko ru
- Grigory Sobkovsky ru
- Afansy Sobolev ru
- Vitaly Sobolev ru
- Dmitry Sobolev ru
- Ivan Sobolev ru
- Konstantin Sobolev ru
- Mikhail Sobolev ru
- Nikolai Alekseevich Sobolev ru
- Nikolai Leontevich Sobolev ru
- Semyon Sobolev ru
- Aleksandr Sobolevsky ru
- Anatoly Sobolevsky ru
- Gavrill Sobyanin ru
- Ivan Sobyanin ru
- Mikhail Sovetsky ru
- Vladmir Sozinov ru
- Aleksandr Sozonov ru
- Ivan Sokol ru
- Rudolf Sokolinsky ru
- Aleksandr Sokolov ru
- Aleksey Sokolov ru
- Anatoly Ivanovich Sokolov ru
- Anatoly Mikhailovich Sokolov ru
- Afrikan Sokolov ru
- Boris Sokolov ru
- Valtentin Yevgenevich Sokolov ru
- Valentin Pterovich Sokolov ru
- Vasily Afanasevich Sokolov ru
- Vasily Pavlovich Sokolov
- Grigory Maksimovich Sokolov ru
- Grigory Semyonovich Sokolov ru
- Dmitry Sokolov ru
- Leonid Sokolov ru
- Mikhail Andrianovich Sokolov ru
- Mikhail Anisimovich Sokolov ru
- Mikhail Vasilyevich Sokolov ru
- Mikhail Yegorovich Sokolov ru
- Nikolai Vasilyevich Sokolov (lieutenant) ru
- Nikolai Vasilyevich Sokolov (general) ru
- Nikolai Mikhailovich Sokolov ru
- Nikolai Semyonovich Sokolov ru
- Semyon Sokolov ru
- Sergey Leonidovich Sokolov
- Sergey Nikolaevich Sokolov ru
- Yuri Sokolov ru
- Vasily Sokolovsky
- Aleksandr Sokolovsky ru
- Igor Sokolovsky ru
- Pyotr Sokur ru
- Vasily Soldatenko ru
- Ivan Soldatov ru
- Konstantin Soldatov ru
- Mikhail Solntsev ru
- Sergey Solntsev ru
- Vladimir Solovey ru
- Aleksey Solovyov ru
- Anatoly Fyodorovich Solovyov ru
- Anatoly Yakovlevich Solovyov
- Vasily Andreevich Solovyov ru
- Vasily Ivanovich Solovyov ru
- Vitaly Solovyov ru
- Vladimir Solovyov ru
- Vladimir Alekseevich Solovyov (twice)
- Gavriil Solovyov ru
- Yevgeny Solovyov ru
- Ivan Alekseevich Solovyov ru
- Ivan Vladimirovich Solovyov ru
- Konstantin Solovyov ru
- Mikhail Vasilyevich Solovyov ru
- Mikhail Georgievich Solovyov ru
- Mikhail Grigorievich Solovyov
- Mikhail Pavlovich Solovyov ru
- Nikolai Solovyov ru
- Pyotr Solovyov ru
- Trofim Solovyov ru
- Nikolai Sologub ru
- Makar Solodinov ru
- Nikolai Solodilov ru
- Leonid Solodkov
- Nikolai Solodkov ru
- Afanasy Solodov ru
- Yefim Solodov ru
- Artyom Solodyshev ru
- Aleksandr Solomatin ru
- Aleksey Solomatin
- Yefim Solomennikov ru
- Ivan Ivanovich Solomonenko ru
- Ivan Solomonikov ru
- Aleksandr Solomonov ru
- Vladimir Solonchenko ru
- Timofey Solopenko ru
- Ion Soltys ru
- Alekandr Soluyanov ru
- Vladimir Solyanik ru
- Anatoly Soyanikov ru
- Andrey Sommer ru
- Ivan Somov ru
- Mikhail Somov
- Pyotr Somov ru
- Ivan Sonin ru
- Filipp Sonnov ru
- Ilya Sopin ru
- Mikhail Soplyakov ru
- Bondzi Sordiyz ru
- Igor Sornev ru
- Aleksey Soroka ru
- Artyom Soroka ru
- Vasily Soroka ru
- Ivan Soroka ru
- Aleksey Sorokin ru
- Anatoly Sorokin ru
- Andrey Sorokin ru
- Boris Sorokin ru
- Vasily Andreevich Sorokin ru
- Vasily Petrovich Sorokin ru
- Vitaly Sorokin ru
- Georgy Sorokin ru
- Grigory Sorokin ru
- Zakhar Sorokin
- Ivan Alekseevich Sorokin ru
- Ivan Ivanovich Sorokin ru
- Ivan Petrovich Sorokin ru
- Ivan Fyodorovich Sorokin ru
- Mikhail Ivanovich Sorokin ru
- Mikhail Mikhailovich Sorokin ru
- Mikhail Yakovlevich Sorokin ru
- Pavel Vasilyevich Sorokin ru
- Sergey Dmitrievich Sorokin ru
- Sergey Maksimovich Sorokin ru
- Fyodor Sorokin ru
- Vladimir Sosin ru
- Nikolai Sosin ru
- Nina Sosnina
- Aleksey Sosnov ru
- Aleksey Sosnovsky ru
- Aleksandr Sotnikov ru
- Vasily Sotnikov ru
- Mikhail Sotnikov ru
- Nikolai Sotnikov ru
- Mikhail Sotnichenko ru
- Mikhail Sokhin ru
- Antonín Sochor
- Alekandr Sotsenko ru
- Makar Sochenko ru
- Karsybay Spataev ru
- Fyodor Spakhov ru
- Aleksandr Spekov ru
- Fyodor Spekov ru
- Moisey Spivak ru
- Aleksandr Spivakov ru
- Pyotr Spikin ru
- Nikolai Spiridenko ru
- Vladimir Spiridonov ru
- Aleksandr Spirin ru
- Andrey Spirin ru
- Vasily Spirin ru
- Ivan Spirin ru
- Nikolai Spirin ru
- Pyotr Spirin ru
- Stepan Spirkov ru
- Ivan Spiryakov ru
- Ivan Spitsin ru
- Spiridon Spitsyn ru
- Ivan Spichak ru
- Grigory Spolnik ru
- Sidor Sribny ru
- Nikolai Starnichuk ru
- Joseph Stalin
- Gemel Stankevich ru
- Stepan Stanchev ru
- Ivan Starzhinsky ru
- Anatoly Starikov ru
- Valentin Starikov ru
- Dmitry Starikov ru
- Mikhail Ivanovich Starikov ru
- Mikhail Semyonovich Starikov ru
- Pyotr Starikov ru
- Aleksandr Starikovsky ru
- Georgy Starkov ru
- Yakov Staroverov ru
- Mikhail Starovoytov ru
- Georgy Starodubtsev ru
- Ivan Starokon ru
- Vasily Starostin ru
- Dmitry Starostin ru
- Nikolai Starostin ru
- Aleksandr Startsev ru
- Fyodor Startsev ru
- Artemy Starchenko ru
- Ivan Starchenkov ru
- Nikolai Starchikov ru
- Nikolai Starshinov ru
- Aleksandr Starygin ru
- Aleksey Starykh ru
- Ivan Starykh ru
- Vasily Stasyuk ru
- Nikita Stasyuk ru
- Aleksey Stakhorsky ru
- Vasily Statsenko ru
- Yakov Statsenko ru
- Nikolai Statsyuk ru
- Nikolai Stashek ru
- Nikolai Stashkov ru
- Andrey Steba ru
- Fyodor Stebenyov ru
- Aleksandr Steblyov ru
- Aleksey Steblevsky ru
- Sergey Steblinsky ru
- Yevgeny Stelmakh ru
- Pyotr Stemasov ru
- Yelena Stempkovskaya
- Vladimir Stenin ru
- Afonasy Stennikov ru
- Vasily Stepanenko ru
- Grigory Stepanenko ru
- Ivan Stepanenko (twice)
- Pavel Stepanenko ru
- Pyotr Stepanenko ru
- Mikhail Stepanishchev (twice)
- Fyodor Stepannikov ru
- Aleksandr Alekseevich Stepanov ru
- Aleksandr Mikhailovich Stepanov ru
- Aleksandr Nikolaevich Stepanov ru
- Aleksey Stepanov ru
- Arseny Stepanov ru
- Grigory Stepanov ru
- Dmitry Stepanov ru
- Yevgeny Stepanov ru
- Ivan Vasilyevich Stepanov ru
- Ivan Georgievich Stepanov ru
- Ivan Fyodorovich Stepanov ru
- Konstantin Stepanov ru
- Mikhail Iudovich Stepanov ru
- Mikhail Karpovich Stepanov ru
- Nikita Stepanov ru
- Nikolai Nikitovich Stepanov ru
- Nikolai Petrovich Stepanov ru
- Nikolai Savvich Stepanov ru
- Oleg Stepanov ru
- Fyodor Stepanov ru
- Viktor Stepanenchenko ru
- Grigory Stepanyuk ru
- Nelson Stepanyan (twice)
- Ivan Stepashov ru
- Vasily Styopin ru
- Viktor Styopin ru
- Kuzma Stepin ru
- Arsenty Stepovoy ru
- Nikolai Stepovoy ru
- Semyon Stepuk ru
- Yakov Stepchenko ru
- Aleksey Sterelyukhin ru
- Yefim Sterin ru
- Vasily Sterligov ru
- Dmitry Stefanov ru
- Pyotr Stefanovsky
- Nikolai Stefanchikov ru
- Aleksandr Stovba ru
- Nikolai Stogov ru
- Filipp Stolbov ru
- Nikolai Stolnikov ru
- Aleksandr Stolyarov ru
- Lev Stolyarov ru
- Nikolai Georgievich Stolyarov (twice)
- Nikolai Ivanovich Stolyarov ru
- Flor Stolyarchuk ru
- Aleksey Storozhakov ru
- Feodosy Stotsky ru
- Ilya Strateychuk ru
- Natan Stratievsky ru
- Pyotr Stratiychuk ru
- Gennady Strekalov (twice)
- Pyotr Strekalov ru
- Dmitry Strelets ru
- Fyodor Strelets ru
- Filipp Strelets ru
- Pyotr Streletsky ru
- Vladimir Strelkov ru
- Nikolai Strelkov ru
- Spiridon Strelkov ru
- Vasily Strelnikov ru
- Yefim Strelnikov ru
- Ivan Strelnikov ru
- Vasily Andreevich Strektsov ru
- Vasily Dmitrievich Strektsov ru
- Viktor Nikolaevich Strektsov ru
- Viktor Sergeevich Strektsov ru
- Vladimir Streltsov ru
- Pavel Streltsov ru
- Vladimir Strelchenko ru
- Prokofy Strenakov ru
- Fyodor Strenin ru
- Grigory Strepetov ru
- Konstantin Striganov ru
- Vasily Strigunov ru
- Vladimir Strizhak ru
- Pavel Strizhak ru
- Aleksey Strizhachenko ru
- Yakov Strizhenko ru
- Matevy Strizhkov ru
- Nikolai Strobykub-Yukhvit ru
- Dmitry Stroganov ru
- Nikolai Stroikov ru
- Vasily Strokov ru
- Leonid Stromkin ru
- Kirill Stronsky ru
- Ivan Strochko ru
- Ivan Struzhkin ru
- Ivan Strukov ru
- Vasily Struchkov ru
- Vasily Strygin ru
- Andrey Stryukov ru
- Yakov Studennikov
- Vasily Stukalov ru
- Grigory Stupak ru
- Ivan Stupin ru
- Mikhail Stupishin ru
- Mikhail Styazhkin ru
- Nikolai Subbota ru
- Valentin Subbotin ru
- Vladimir Subbotin ru
- Yefim Subbotin ru
- Ivan Subbotin ru
- Nikolai Subbotin ru
- Pavel Subbotin ru
- Serafim Subbotin
- Yuri Subbotin ru
- Viktor Suvirov ru
- Aleksandr Ivanovich Suvorov (politruk) ru
- Aleksandr Ivanovich Suvorov (lieutenant) ru
- Aleksandr Yakovlevich Suvorov ru
- Vasily Suvorov ru
- Pyotr Suvorov ru
- Rodion Suvorov ru
- Sergey Nikolaevich Suvorov ru
- Sergey Romanovich Suvorov ru
- Stepan Suvorov ru
- Sergey Sugak ru
- Boris Sugerov ru
- Aleksandr Suginyaev ru
- Vladimir Sugrin ru
- Vladimir Sudakov ru
- Mikhail Sudakov ru
- Arkady Sudarev ru
- Sergey Sudeysky ru
- Vladimir Sudets
- Nikolai Sudilovsky ru
- Imants Sudmalis
- Mikhail Sudnishnikov ru
- Andrey Sudorgin ru
- Viktor Suzdalsky ru
- Nikolai Sukach ru
- Trofim Sukov ru
- Nikolai Sukovatov ru
- Aleksandr Sulaberidze ru
- Viktor Sulyov ru
- Idris Suleymanov
- Rizvan Suleymanov ru
- Sharif Suleymanov ru
- Yakov Suleymanov ru
- Joldas Suleymanov ru
- Andrey Sulima ru
- Pavel Sulimov ru
- Semyon Sulin ru
- Amet-khan Sultan (twice)
- Bary Sultanov ru
- Zakir Sultanov ru
- Isa Sultanov ru
- Yakov Suldin ru
- Andrey Sumin ru
- Zhavdat Sunagatillin ru
- Ivan Sundiev ru
- Dmitry Suponin ru
- Vasily Suprun ru
- Stepan Suprun (twice)
- Ivan Suptel ru
- Kudaybergen Suraganov ru
- Grigory Suramelashvili ru
- Aleksey Surikov ru
- Emil Surikov ru
- Martyn Surin ru
- Vasily Sukov ru
- Grigory Sukov ru
- Pyotr Surkov ru
- Fyodor Surkov ru
- Mikhail Surmach ru
- Nikolai Surnev ru
- Georgy Surnin ru
- Aleksandr Surov ru
- Boris Surovtsev ru
- Pyotr Surovtsev ru
- Mikhail Suroshnikov ru
- Aleksandr Suslov ru
- Aleksey Nikolaevich Suslov ru
- Aleksey Petrovich Suslov ru
- Vasily Suslov ru
- Pyotr Suslov ru
- Yakov Susko ru
- Georgy Sutormin ru
- Grigory Sutulov ru
- Aleksandr Sutyrin ru
- Nikolai Sutyagin
- Sufy Sufyanov ru
- Agadil Sukhambaev ru
- Viktor Sukhanov ru
- Vitaly Sukhanov ru
- Mikhail Sukhanov ru
- Nikolai Sukhanov ru
- Aleksandr Sukharev ru
- Aleksey Sukharev ru
- Yevstafy Sukharev ru
- Ivan Sukharev ru
- Sergey Sukharev ru
- Dmitry Sukharnikov ru
- Tikhov Sukhatsky ru
- Vladimir Sukhachyov ru
- Aleksandr Sukhin ru
- Semyon Sukhin ru
- Nikolai Sukhikh ru
- Nikolai Sukhobsky ru
- Vasily Arsentevich Sukhov ru
- Vasily Ivanovich Sukhov ru
- Vasily Semyonovich Sukhov
- Ivan Prokofevich Sukhov ru
- Ivan Stepanovich Sukhov ru
- Konstantin Sukhov ru
- Nikolai Sukhov ru
- Yuri Sukhov ru
- Dmitry Sukhovarov
- Ivan Mikhailovich Sukhomlin ru
- Ivan Moiseevich Sukhomlin ru
- Dmitry Sukhonenko ru
- Aleksey Sukhorukov ru
- Andrey Sukhorukov ru
- Ivan Aleksandrovich Sukhorukov ru
- Ivan Fyodorovich Sukhorukov ru
- Ivan Sukhoruchkin ru
- Pyotr Sukhoruchkin ru
- Aleksandr Suchkov ru
- Nikolai Sushanov ru
- Fyofor Sushkov ru
- Filipp Sushkov ru
- Stepan Sushchev ru
- Kudrat Suyanov ru
- Grigory Skhulukhiya ru
- Vladimir Schastnov ru
- Mikhail Sydko ru
- Pyotr Sykalo ru
- Ivan Sypalo ru
- Ivan Srykin ru
- Pyotr Syroezhkin ru
- Boris Syromyatnikov ru
- Nikolai Syromyatnikov ru
- Sergey Syromyatnikov ru
- Mullayar Syrtlanov ru
- Maguba Syrtlanova
- Dmitry Syrtsov ru
- Vasily Sysoev ru
- Mikhail Sysoev ru
- Pyotr Sysoev ru
- Yuri Sysoev ru
- Mikhail Sysoletin ru
- Vasily Sysolyatin ru
- Ivan Sysolyatin ru
- Vladimir Sytnik ru
- Ivan Sytov
- Andrey Sytko ru
- Vladimir Sych ru
- Aleksandr Sychyov ru
- Vasily Sychyov ru
- Ivan Sychyov ru
- Pyotr Sychenko ru
- Terenty Sychkov ru
- Nikolai Sushchikov ru
- Ilya Syanov ru
- Pyotr Syutkin ru
- Nikolai Syabro ru
