= Sidorenko =

Sidorenko is an East Slavic patronymic surname derived from the Ukrainian surname Sydorenko, meaning "descendant of Sydir/Sidor".

- Aleksandr Sidorenko (wrestler) (born 1972), Belarusian wrestler
- Alexandre Sidorenko (born 1988), French tennis player
- Alexey Sidorenko (born 1983), Kazakhstani beach volleyball player
- Denis Sidorenko, Belarusian diplomat
- Dmitri Sidorenko (born 1973), Russian footballer
- Elizaveta Sidorenko (born 2003), Russian Paralympic swimmer
- Ivan Ilyich Sidorenko (1907–1984), Red Army sergeant
- Ivan Mikhailovich Sidorenko (1919–1994), Red Army officer
- Kirill Sidorenko (born 1983), Russian ice hockey player
- Oleksandra Sidorenko, Polish boxer
- Pavel Sidorenko (born 1987), Kyrgyzstani footballer
- Tamara Maliukova Sidorenko (1919–2005), Ukrainian composer
- Tatyana Sidorenko (born 1966), Soviet volleyball player
- Vasiliy Sidorenko (born 1961), Soviet-Russian hammer thrower
