= Sergei Safronov =

Sergei Safronov may refer to:

- Sergei Safronov (fighter pilot) (died 1960), senior lieutenant in the Soviet Union air force
- Sergei Safronov (Hero of the Soviet Union) (1919–1983), Russian aviator
