= Shalimov =

Shalimov (Russian: Шалимов) is a Russian masculine surname, its feminine counterpart is Shalimova. It may refer to

- Igor Shalimov (born 1969), Russian football manager and a former midfielder
- Viktor Shalimov (born 1951), Russian ice hockey player
- Vladimir Shalimov (1908–1942), Russian pilot
