= Vasily Semyonovich Sukhov =

- Василий Семёнович Сухов
- Born: 1925; Suetovo farm, Soletsky District of the Novgorod Oblast
- Died: June 24, 1944 (aged 18–19); Perk-Jarvi station
- Military career
- Allegiance: Soviet Union
- Branch: Infantry
- Service years: 1944
- Rank: soldier
- Conflicts: World War II (DOW)
- Awards: Hero of the Soviet Union

Vasily Semyonovich Sukhov (1925 - June 24, 1944) was a participant in the Great Patriotic War, partisan, later a rifleman of the 14th Infantry Regiment (72nd Pavlovsk Infantry Division, 21st Army, Leningrad Front) and Hero of the Soviet Union (1944).

== Biography ==
Vasily Semyonovich Sukhov was born in 1925 on the Suetovo farm (Note: Now Soletsky District of the Novgorod Oblast.) into a peasant family. Russian by nationality. After finishing the 8th grade of school, he lived in Soltsy and worked with his father Semyon Fedorovich at the Pobeda state farm.

On July 14, 1941, the city was occupied by the Germans; the Sukhov family did not have time to evacuate. In the summer of 1943, Vasily Sukhov, his younger brother Ivan and friend Vladimir Duplev stole a German semi-tractor and tried to use it to reach a partisan detachment. However, the Nazis organized pursuit, and the semi-tractor had to be abandoned on the outskirts of the forest. They broke away from the pursuit and soon met with the partisans of the 5th Partisan Brigade. They were enrolled in the partisan detachment. Seventeen-year-old Vasily became a demolition bomber, fifteen-year-old Ivan became a scout. The brothers took part in ambushes and explosions, in the defeat of enemy garrisons, including a night raid on the German garrison in the village of Dubets near Soltsy. After the liberation of the Soletsky region by the troops of the Leningrad and Volkhov fronts, the 5th brigade was disbanded, and Vasily Sukhov was sent to the active army.

At the beginning of June 1944, the 72nd Division advanced on the Karelian Isthmus. Komsomol organizer of the rifle company of the 14th rifle regiment V.S. Sukhov raised the soldiers to attack and broke through the enemy's defenses. For his courage he was awarded the Order of Glory, III degree.

In June 1944, in the battle for the Tali (Note: Now village of Paltsevo of the Leningrad Oblast) junction station, Red Army soldier Sukhov replaced the deceased company commander. For two days, 45 soldiers under the command of Sukhov held the station and repelled 5 enemy counterattacks. In the battle he was wounded several times, but refused to leave the company's location. Sukhov carried the seriously wounded new company commander, Senior Lieutenant Polyakov, out of the battle and was wounded in the leg by a mine fragment. Bleeding, he was sent to the 119th reception evacuation point, where he died on June 24, 1944 (according to other sources June 23, 1944).

He was buried in a mass grave at Perk-Jarvi station. (Note: Now village of Kirillovskoye of the Leningrad Oblast)

By a decree of the Presidium of the Supreme Soviet of the USSR dated July 21, 1944, for the courage and heroism shown during the liberation of the Karelian Isthmus, Vasily Semenovich Sukhov was awarded the title of Hero of the Soviet Union (posthumously).

== Awards ==
- Hero of the Soviet Union;
- Order of Lenin;
- Order of Glory Third Class.

== Memory ==
- A memorial plaque was installed on Sukhov's grave in the village of Kirillovskoye.
- Sukhov's name is included in the list of honorary citizens of Vyborg.
- Sukhov is forever included in the lists of the military unit.

The following were named after V.S. Sukhov:

- streets in the cities of Vyborg and Soltsy.
- secondary school in Leningrad.
- Pioneer squad in Soltsy.

== Books ==
- Shkadov, Ivan, ed. (1988). Герои Советского Союза: краткий биографический словарь [Heroes of the Soviet Union: A Brief Biographical Dictionary] (in Russian). Vol. 2. Moscow: Voenizdat. ISBN 5203005362.
- Тэммо, А. М., ed. (1996). Сухов Василий Семёнович // Книга Памяти. Новгородская область в годы Великой Отечественной войны: Материалы, документы, исследования (in Russian). Новгород: Кириллица.
- Витушкин, С. Ф., ed. (1987). Путь мужества // Золотые звёзды новгородцев // Книга Памяти. Новгородская область в годы Великой Отечественной войны: Материалы, документы, исследования (in Russian). Ленинград: Лениздат.
- Буров, А. В., ed. (1970). Твои Герои, Ленинград (in Russian). Ленинград: Лениздат.
