= Sydorenko =

Sydorenko is a Ukrainian-language patronymic surname, Сидоренко, meaning "descendant of Sydir":

- Denys Sydorenko (born 1989), Ukrainian footballer
- Kyrylo Sydorenko (born 1985), Ukrainian footballer
- Danylo Sydorenko (born 2003), Ukrainian footballer
- Danylo Sydorenko (born 1999), Ukrainian footballer
- Kseniya Sydorenko (born 1986), Ukrainian synchronized swimmer
- Nataliya Sydorenko Tobias (born 1980), Ukrainian athlete
- Oleksandr Sydorenko (born 1960), Ukrainian swimmer
- Olena Sydorenko (born 1974), Ukrainian volleyball player
- Victor Sydorenko (born 1953), Ukrainian painter
- Valeriy Sydorenko (born 1976), Ukrainian boxer
- Volodymyr Sydorenko (born 1976), Ukrainian boxer
- Vladyslav Sydorenko (born 1997), Ukrainian footballer

== See also ==
- Sidorenko
