= Yevgeny Shapovalov =

Yevgeny Petrovich Shapovalov
- Евгений Петрович Шаповалов
- Born: 25 December 1904; Taganrog, Don Host Oblast, Russian Empire
- Died: 8 November 1977 (aged 72); Kiev, USSR
- Burial place: Лукьяновское военное кладбище
- Military career
- Allegiance: USSR
- Branch: Soviet Army
- Service years: 1922–1955
- Rank: Major general
- Conflicts: World War II; Eastern Front; Battle of Berlin
- Awards: Hero of the Soviet Union; Order of Lenin (2); Order of the Red Banner (4); Gold Star
- Other work: sovkhoz in Fastiv Raion of Kiev Oblast (1960–1965)

Yevgeny Petrovich Shapovalov (Russian: Евгений Петрович Шаповалов) was a Soviet army general who was awarded the title Hero of the Soviet Union.

== Biography ==
Yevgeny Shapovalov was born on December 25, 1904, in the city of Taganrog into a worker's family. He received elementary education in a Taganrog's school and worked as a professional shoemaker.

He joined the Red Army in 1922 and received higher military education in Kharkiv (1925) and later at Frunze Military Academy (1944). He became a member of Communist Party of the Soviet Union in 1940.

During the German-Soviet War, lieutenant colonel Shapovalov commanded the 23rd Guards Motor Rifle Brigade of the 7th Guards Tank Corps, and was especially successful at the Battle of Berlin in April–May 1945. On May 31, 1945, he was awarded the titles of Hero of the Soviet Union, Order of Lenin and the Gold Star medal.

In 1951, he graduated from the Stalin Military Academy of Tank and Mechanized Forces.

In 1955, he retired and worked as director of a sovkhoz in Fastiv Raion of Kiev Oblast from 1960 to 1965, after which time he became a pensioner.

He died in Kiev on November 8, 1977, and is buried at Kyiv's Lukyanovskoe Military Cemetery.

== Awards ==
Hero of the Soviet Union
Order of Lenin (2)
Order of the Red Banner (4)
Gold Star

== External links and references ==
- Yevgeny Shapovalov at War Heroes web site
