= Filipp Shtanko =

WW2 Army Colonel

Filipp Feofanovich Shtanko (Russian: Филипп Феофанович Штанько, Ukrainian: Пилип Феофанович Штанько; 2 July 1905 – 20 April 1993) was a Soviet Army colonel and a Hero of the Soviet Union who held brigade command during World War II.

== Early life and prewar service ==
A Ukrainian, Filipp Feofanovich Shtanko was born on 2 July 1905 in the village of Voronovka, Olshansky volost, Zvenigorodsky Uyezd, Kiev Governorate. Conscripted into the Red Army in November 1927, he was sent to the 4th Caucasian Rifle Regiment at Gyandzha as a Red Army man. Graduating from the regimental school in 1928, Shtanko rose to assistant platoon commander. After completing the Kiev Combined Course for the Training of Commanders in 1931, he served with the 71st Rifle Regiment of the Ukrainian Military District at Vinnitsa as a platoon commander, assistant company commander, and company commander. In January 1935, he was transferred to command a motor rifle and machine gun company of the 22nd Rifle Brigade of the Kiev Military District at Starokonstantinov, and in November 1937, rose to command the motor rifle battalion of the 26th Tank Brigade. In May 1938, he was appointed assistant chief of staff of the 131st Rifle Regiment at Novograd-Volynsky. In August, he was transferred to the district headquarters, where he served as chief of a section of the 4th Department, and chief of a section of the Organizational and Mobilization Department. Shtanko completed the Vystrel course in 1941.

== World War II ==
After Germany invaded the Soviet Union, Shtanko served at the Kiev Military District headquarters from 26 June as senior assistant chief of a section of the Organizational and Mobilization Department and the Manning Department. In October he was appointed chief of staff of the 444th Rifle Regiment of the 108th Rifle Division, which fought in the Battle of Moscow as part of the 5th Army of the Western Front.

In March 1942, Shtanko was transferred to serve as chief of staff of the 2nd Rifle Regiment of the 50th Rifle Division, and took command of the regiment on 5 April. In early February 1943 the regiment was relocated to the Southwestern Front and took defensive positions on the Seversky Donets. Shtanko was wounded twice in the early period of the war.

Shtanko took command of the 23rd Tank Corps' 56th Motor Rifle Brigade on 20 June, leading it for the rest of the war. In 1943 he led it in the Izyum–Barvenkovo offensive, the Donbass offensive, the Zaporozhye Offensive, and the Melitopol offensive. Shtanko was wounded on 24 August in the region of Dolgenkaya, and awarded the Order of the Red Banner on 3 October. During the March 1944 Bereznegovatoye–Snigirevka offensive, Shtanko's brigade supported Cavalry-Mechanized Group Pliyev, taking part in the liberation of Novy Bug. The brigade forced the Southern Bug and in April reached the Dniester south of Tiraspol during the Odessa Offensive. For his performance, Shtanko was awarded the Order of Bogdan Khmelnitsky, 2nd class, on 19 March. He was promoted to colonel on 25 April.

During the Second Jassy–Kishinev offensive, between 20 and 31 August, Shtanko's brigade broke through the German and Romanian defenses south of Târgu Frumos, forced the Siret and Moldova rivers and together with the corps' tank brigades took the cities of Roman, Bacău, and Adjud. Between 26 and 31 August, the brigade attacked Oituz from the rear with a flanking maneuver, breaking through the defenses on the Oituz Pass into the Carpathians and seizing the two main strongpoints of the fortified region: Oituz and Breskul. These actions enabled the Soviet advance into Transylvania. For his performance, Shtanko received the title Hero of the Soviet Union on 13 September. Subsequently, the brigade took part in the Debrecen Offensive, the Budapest Offensive, and the Vienna Offensive. For his performance, Shtanko received a second Order of the Red Banner and the Order of Suvorov, 2nd class.

== Postwar ==
After the end of the war, Shtanko continued to command the brigade, reorganized into the 56th Motor Rifle Regiment in August 1945 and relocated to the Lvov Military District. He was transferred to the Group of Soviet Occupation Forces in Germany in January 1948 to command the 33rd Guards Motor Rifle Regiment of 9th Guards Tank Division of the 2nd Guards Mechanized Army, and in September 1949 rose to chief of the army Cadre Department. In November 1951 he was transferred to the Belorussian Military District to serve in the same capacity for the 7th Mechanized Army. Shtanko was transferred to the reserve in January 1955. He retired to Melitopol. Shtanko committed suicide on 20 April 1993, after the theft of his decorations. According to local newspapers, his suicide note read:

These scoundrels brazenly stole what I earned with my blood in the struggle with the enemy, defending the Homeland. These awards cost me dearly, and I can't survive this blow..."

== Awards ==
Shtanko was a recipient of the following decorations:

- Hero of the Soviet Union
- Order of Lenin (2)
- Order of the Red Banner (3)
- Order of Suvorov, 2nd class
- Order of Bogdan Khmelnitsky, 2nd class
- Order of the Patriotic War, 1st class
- Order of the Red Star (2)
