= Maxim Shmatov =

Maxim Vasilyevich Shmatov
- Максим Васильевич Шматов
- Born: 17 January 1914; Verkhneye Turov village, Nizhnedevitsky Uyezd, Voronezh Governorate, Russian Empire
- Died: 5 October 1984 (aged 70); Voronezh, Soviet Union
- Military career
- Allegiance: Soviet Union
- Branch: Red Army
- Service years: 1939–1946
- Rank: Major
- Unit: 108th Guards Rifle Division
- Conflicts: World War II; Second Jassy–Kishinev Offensive; Budapest Offensive
- Awards: Hero of the Soviet Union

Maxim Vasilyevich Shmatov (Russian: Максим Васильевич Шматов; 17 January 1914 – 5 October 1984) was a Red Army major and Hero of the Soviet Union. Shmatov was awarded the title Hero of the Soviet Union and the Order of Lenin for leadership of his battalion during the Budapest Offensive.

== Early life ==
Maxim Shmatov was born on 17 January 1914 in the village of Verkhneye Turov in Voronezh Governorate to a peasant family. After seven years of school, Shmatov worked on a farm. From 1935, he worked in the Voronezh trade network. In 1939, he was drafted into the Red Army.

== World War II ==
In September 1941, Shmatov fought in combat on the Southwestern Front at Poltava, serving in a reconnaissance unit. On 17 January 1942, he was seriously wounded. After recovery, he graduated from courses for junior lieutenants. As commander of a machine gun company, he fought in the Battle of Stalingrad and in September was seriously wounded again. After recovering, Shmatov was assigned to the 305th Guards Rifle Regiment of the 108th Guards Rifle Division. In 1944, he joined the Communist Party of the Soviet Union. In March, he fought in the capture of Mykolaiv and then Odessa. On 15 June, he was awarded the Order of the Red Star. In August, Shmatov participated in the capture of Bender and Izmail.

The division fought in the Budapest Offensive during the fall of 1944. By this time, Shmatov was a lieutenant and deputy battalion commander in the regiment. He temporarily took over command of the battalion when its designated command became ill. On the night of 5 December 1944, under strong machine gun fire from German troops, Shmatov was among the first in the regiment to cross the Danube south of Ercsi and destroyed a machine gun position with two grenades. After overcoming strong resistance, the battalion broke through the German defense line and claimed a bridgehead. The battalion then advanced and cut road and rail links to Budapest. On 5 December, Shmatov's battalion reportedly repulsed seven counterattacks, killed 163 German soldiers, destroyed 4 guns and 12 machine guns. Shmatov continued to lead his battalion during the subsequent Siege of Budapest. During the siege, his battalion reportedly killed 1,430 enemy soldiers.

On 24 March 1945, Shmatov was awarded the title Hero of the Soviet Union and the Order of Lenin. He was also awarded the Order of Alexander Nevsky on 27 March for his leadership. In April 1945, Shmatov fought in the Vienna Offensive.

== Postwar ==
In 1946, Shmatov was discharged with the rank of major and moved to Voronezh. In 1949, he graduated from the Regional Party School. He graduated from the Higher Party School of the Central Committee in 1956. He undertook party and economic work in the canteens. Shmatov died on 5 October 1984 and was buried in Voronezh.
