= Aleksandr Senatorov =

Soviet military commander

- Александр Сергеевич Сенаторов
- Born: 8 October 1912; Vyshelej, Penza Oblast, Russian Empire
- Died: 24 January 1993 (aged 80); Moscow, Russia
- Military career
- Allegiance: Soviet Union
- Branch: Soviet Air Force
- Rank: Lieutenant general
- Conflicts: Spanish Civil War; Battle of Lake Khasan; World War II
- Awards: Hero of the Soviet Union

Aleksandr Sergeevich Senatorov (Russian: Александр Сергеевич Сенаторов; 8 October 1912 – 24 January 1993) was a lieutenant-general in the Soviet Air Force.

== Biography ==
Born in the village of Vyshelej, Penza Oblast to a working-class family, he was a member of the Communist Party from 1938 onwards. Senatorov trained at the Penza Aviation School of the Civil Air Fleet. He entered the Soviet Army in 1930 and graduated from the Odessa Military Aviation School in 1932.

He participated in the Spanish Civil War from 1936 to 1939, assisting the Republican government. As the commander of a detachment of a fast bomber squadron he bombed military targets deep in the rear of enemy lines. He personally led a group of bombers to the northern front, which landed without incident at a destroyed airfield. He completed 100 combat sorties. He was awarded the title Hero of the Soviet Union on 14 March 1938 and went on to graduate from the General Staff Academy's advanced course for command personnel in 1939.

Soon after returning to his homeland, he was appointed deputy commander of the Air Force of the Separate Red Banner Far Eastern Army and in September 1938, deputy commander of the Air Force of the 1st Separate Red Banner Army. In this position he participated in the Battle of Lake Khasan. In 1939 he graduated from the Advanced Training Courses for the Higher Commanding Staff (KUVNAS) at the Academy of the General Staff. Since June 1940 he was Air Force Commander in the 1st Red Banner Army.

During World War II he was a Major-General of Aviation and in the summer of 1942 he was appointed commander of the 9th Air Army of the Far Eastern Front. From September 1944, he was the deputy commander of the 16th Air Army, which, as part of the 1st Belorussian Front, fought against the Germans in the Vistula-Oder and Berlin offensive operations.

He graduated from the General Staff Academy in 1948 and retired in 1963 as a Lieutenant-General and lived in Moscow until his death.

== Awards ==
- Hero of the Soviet Union
- Two Orders of Lenin
- Two Order of the Red Banner
- Order of Bogdan Khmelnitsky 1st class
- Order of Suvorov 2nd class
- Order of the Patriotic War 1st class
- Two Order of the Red Star
- Order of the Badge of Honour
- campaign and jubilee medals
