= Vasily Senko =

Soviet Air Force colonel (1921–1984)

Vasily Vasilyevich Senko
- Василий Васильевич Сенько
- Born: 15 October 1921; Semenivka, Gomel Governorate, RSFSR
- Died: 5 June 1984 (aged 62); Tambov, RSFSR, USSR
- Military career
- Allegiance: Soviet Union
- Branch: Soviet Air Force
- Service years: 1940–1977
- Rank: Colonel
- Conflicts: World War II
- Awards: Hero of the Soviet Union (twice)

Vasily Vasilyevich Senko (Russian: Василий Васильевич Сенько, Ukrainian: Василь Васильович Сенько; 15 October 1921 – 5 June 1984) was a Soviet Air Force colonel and the only navigator who was twice awarded the title Hero of the Soviet Union.

== Early life ==
Senko was born on 15 October 1921 to a Ukrainian peasant family in Semenivka. There he completed his tenth grade of school in 1938 before moving on to the Novozybkov State Pedagogical Institute, which he graduated from in 1940; then from September to December that year he worked as a science teacher at a school in the Bryansk oblast, with his short tenure being due to entering the military at the end of the year. He became a member of the Communist Party in 1942.

== World War II ==
Shortly after the start of Operation Barbarossa, Senko graduated from the Olsufev Military Aviation School of Bombardier-gunners; then he trained at the Taganrog Military Aviation School of Pilots, where he studied until being sent to the front in November. Upon arrival to the warfront as part of the 667th Night Bomber Aviation Regiment, he began flying combat missions on the R-5 bomber, accumulating 80 sorties by September 1942. He then transferred to the 752nd Long-range Aviation Regiment as a navigator; the unit later received the guards designation and was renamed the 10th Guards Long-range Aviation Regiment in March 1943. Soon upon arrival to the unit he flew 3-4 sorties per day on the Stalingrad front. During one mission he successfully led his crew to a large Axis airfield that contained up to 200 enemy bombers, which they then bombed. Later that day he flew in a mission that resulted in the destruction of a railway station.

Bad weather and night-flying conditions did not stop Senko from leading the bomber; on one mission his crew was unable to fly above a thunderstorm, yet he still was able to help them reach the target. In his nomination for the title Hero of the Soviet Union, which was filed in January 1943, it was noted that he flew in 154 sorties, with all but ten of them being at night. For much of his time he flew under pilot Dmitry Barashev, who later died in a plane crash in summer 1943; Senko was not in the crash because he stopped flying as part of Barashev's crew in the spring. After the Battle of Stalingrad he continued flying in combat, in not just bombing missions but also in supply deliveries to partisans and reconnaissance flights. That summer he began finding targets for other crews of the 2nd Guards Long-Range aviation corps that were not part of his regiment.

Within his regiment, he was tasked with photographing the aftermath of bombing flights. After the reformation of long-range aviation regiments into bomber regiments in December 1944, the 10th Guards Long-range Aviation Regiment became the 226th Guards Bomber Aviation Regiment. As a flight navigator in that unit, he participated in the battles for Warsaw, Koenigsberg, and Berlin. He was praised by his superiors for never becoming disoriented and finding the precise location of targets. At the time of his second nomination for a gold star he had flown 402 sorties, with 392 of them being at night, and by the end of the war he totaled 430 sorties, of which 83 were on the R-5 and the remaining 347 on the Il-4.

== Postwar ==
Senko remained a squadron navigator in his wartime regiment until August 1947, and in 1952 he graduated from the Air Force Academy, after which he was posted to the 84th Separate Heavy Bomber Aviation Corps where he continued to work as a navigator. In June 1953 he was promoted to senior navigator-inspector, but in January 1955 he was transferred to the 55th Heavy Bomber Aviation Division where he was senior navigator. In 1956 he was promoted to deputy chief navigator of the 43rd Air Army of Long-Range Aviation, and in 1959 he became the senior navigator at a school for training officers in Lipetsk.

For the rest of his career he worked at the Tambov Higher Military Aviation School: from 1960 to 1965 as a senior navigator, then from 1965 to 1972 as a senior lecturer in navigation and bombing department, and from then until his retirement in 1977 he was a senior lecturer in the combat department. During his career he flew on the Il-4, Tu-4, Il-28, Tu-16, and Il-28. For the remainder of his life he lived in Tambov, where he died on 5 June 1984 and was buried in the Vozdvizhensky cemetery.

== Awards ==
- Twice Hero of the Soviet Union (25 March 1943 and 29 June 1945)
- Order of Lenin (25 March 1943)
- Order of the Red Banner (20 October 1943)
- Order of the Patriotic War 1st class (29 April 1944)
- Order of the Red Star (30 December 1956)
- Order "For Service to the Homeland in the Armed Forces of the USSR" 3rd class (30 April 1945)
