= Yuri Sukhov =

Soviet pilot

- Юрий Владимирович Сухов
- Born: 22 April 1923; Moscow, USSR
- Died: 6 May 1994 (aged 71); Chkalovsky village, Shchyolkovo, Russian Federation
- Military career
- Allegiance: Soviet Union
- Branch: Soviet Air Force
- Service years: 1940–1963
- Rank: Colonel
- Conflicts: World War II
- Awards: Hero of the Soviet Union; Honoured Test Pilot of the USSR

Yuri Vladimirovich Sukhov (Russian: Юрий Владимирович Сухов; 22 April 1923 — 6 May 1994) was the Soviet test pilot who flew as pilot-in-command on the maiden flight of the Tupolev Tu-154.

== Early life ==
Sukhov was born on 22 April 1923 to a working-class Russian family in Moscow. After completing ten grades of school he joined the military in 1940. In 1941 he graduated from the Voroshilovgrad Military Aviation School of Pilots, and in 1942 he graduated from the Krasnodar United Military Aviation School. He was subsequently stationed as a flight commander in the 11th Reserve Aviation Regiment until being deployed to the warfront as part of the 452nd Bomber Aviation Regiment in April 1944. During the course of the war he was promoted to deputy squadron commander and totaled 59 sorties on the Pe-2 bomber. After the war he continued to serve in the Air Force. Previously, he became a member of the Communist Party in 1944.

== Test pilot career ==
Starting in 1948 he worked as a test pilot at the Civil Aviation Research Institute of the Air Force. There, he flew tests on Tu-16, 3ME, 3MD, and Tu-22. After retiring from active duty and entering the reserve in 1963 he became a test pilot for the Tupolev Design Bureau. There, he took part in tests on Tupolev Tu-22, Tupolev Tu-95, Tupolev Tu-114, Tupolev Tu-124, and Tupolev Tu-134 aircraft, as well as piloting the maiden flight of the first Tupolev Tu-154 prototype on 3 October 1968. For his work as a test pilot he received several high awards including the title Hero of the Soviet Union and Honoured Test Pilot of the USSR.

== Later life ==
After retiring from work as a test pilot he worked as an engineer at the Tupolev Design Bureau. He resided in Chkalovsky village, where he died on 6 June 1994 and was buried in the Leonikha cemetery.

== Awards ==
- Hero of the Soviet Union (29 March 1976)
- Honoured Test Pilot of the USSR (10 December 1963)
- Two Order of Lenin (22 February 1955 and 29 March 1976)
- Order of the Red Banner (20 March 1945)
- Two Order of the Patriotic War 1st class (1 June 1945 and 11 March 1985)
- Order of the Red Banner of Labour (26 April 1971)
- Order of the Red Star (30 December 1956)
