= Nikolai Stolyarov =

Soviet pilot and navigator (1922–1993)

Nikolai Georgievich Stolyarov
- Russian: Николай Георгиевич Столяров
- Stolyarov in 1945
- Born: 22 May 1922; Kazan, RSFSR
- Died: 23 February 1993 (aged 70); Moscow, Russian Federation
- Military career
- Allegiance: Soviet Union
- Branch: Soviet Air Force
- Service years: 1941–1956
- Rank: Colonel
- Unit: 141st Guards Attack Aviation Regiment
- Conflicts: World War II
- Awards: Hero of the Soviet Union (twice)

Nikolai Georgievich Stolyarov (Russian: Николай Георгиевич Столяров; 22 May 1922 – 23 February 1993) was a Soviet Il-2 pilot and navigator during World War II who was twice awarded the title Hero of the Soviet Union.

== Early life ==
Stolyarov was born on 22 May 1922 in Kazan to a working-class Russian family. After completing his tenth grade of school in 1940, he began training at the local flight club while working at the Kazan Gunpowder Plant.

== World War II ==
Shortly before the start of Operation Barbarossa, Stolyarov joined the army in April 1941. He then graduated from the Sverdlovsk Military Aviation School of Pilots in August, after which he served as a flight instructor at the 28th Military Aviation School of Pilots in Kirov. In November he was transferred to the 37th Reserve Aviation Regiment, and in February 1942, he was reassigned to the 34th Reserve Aviation Regiment. In October, he was assigned to the 1st Separate Training Squadron, where he continued his training away from the warfront until he was deployed in December to the 820th Attack Aviation Regiment. He soon made his first combat sortie as an Il-2 pilot, doing so in the Battle for Velikiye Luki. In May 1943, he transferred to the 667th Attack Aviation Regiment, which was honored with the Guards designation and renamed the 141st Guards Attack Aviation Regiment.

During a reconnaissance mission on 18 July 1943 he flew in a formation with five other Il-2 attack aircraft. Enemy fighters targeted them during the flight, but the Soviets managed to drive them away in addition to destroying a tank and three cars. The next month he flew in a mission that resulted in the death of 35 enemy combatants, a tank, and an ammunition storage facility. In October he participated in a dogfight over Kirovograd; he and 16 other Il-2 went up against 20 axis fighters, resulting in the loss of two enemy aircraft.

On 12 January 1944, while he was a flight commander, he was nominated for the title Hero of the Soviet Union for having flown 96 sorties. He was awarded the title on 1 July 1944. The next month, he led a group of eight other aircraft in a mission that resulted in the destruction of three enemy tanks and damaged four more. In October that year, Stolyarov flew a sortie in which he managed to subdue fire from an enemy artillery battery, destroyed four tanks, and five vehicles over the village of Dobroslav 20 minutes before Soviet troops took over the settlement. In March 1945, he flew with a group of 24 Il-2 aircraft; during the mission, they attacked a group of 18 enemy tanks, and destroyed seven of them. After repelling fire from an anti-aircraft battery they managed pursued two infantry battalions, resulting in the death of two companies worth of enemy personnel.

On 2 April 1945, he was nominated for the title Hero of the Soviet Union again for flying 185 missions. He was awarded his second gold star after the end of the war on 27 June 1945. By the end of the war, he flew a total of 187 missions on the Il-2, during which he engaged in 23 dogfights, gaining two personal and three shared shootdowns of enemy aircraft. While Stolyarov usually flew during the day, 16 his sorties during the war were night missions, and he was praised for flying well in poor weather conditions with limited visibility in addition to ground-based anti-aircraft fire and strong counterattacks from enemy fighters. He had survived flying in the battles for Kursk, Kharkov, Belogorod, Berlin, and Prague in addition to taking part in many offensive and defensive operations.

Stolyarov entered combat as a regular pilot and rose through the ranks of his unit, becoming promoted to senior pilot, flight commander, deputy squadron commander, squadron commander and regimental navigator.

== Postwar ==
Stolyarov remained in his regiment until July 1945, and went on to graduate from the Krasnodar Higher Officer School of Navigators in 1946. He then returned to his regiment in May that year, and in July he was transferred to the 140th Guards Attack Aviation Regiment. He remained there until October 1949 and flew the Il-10 in addition to the Il-2. He then graduated from the Air Force Academy in Monino in 1954, after which he served as the commander of the 806th Attack Aviation Regiment from September 1954 until he retired from the military in February 1956. He held a variety of civilian jobs which included working as a technician the housing department of Moscow, a traffic safety engineer, and as a civilian defense engineer. Stolyarov died on 23 February 1993 and was buried in the Troyekurovsky Cemetery.

== Awards and honors ==
- Twice Hero of the Soviet Union (1 July 1944 and 27 June 1945)
- Order of Lenin (1 July 1944)
- Two Order of the Red Banner (19 September 1943 and 29 January 1944)
- Order of Aleksandr Nevsky (22 February 1945)
- Three Order of the Patriotic War (1st class - 2 August 1943 and 11 March 1985; 2nd class - 17 July 1944)
