= Mikhail Stepanishchev =

Soviet ground-attack pilot (1917–1946)

Mikhail Tikhonovich Stepanishchev
- Михаил Тихонович Степанищев
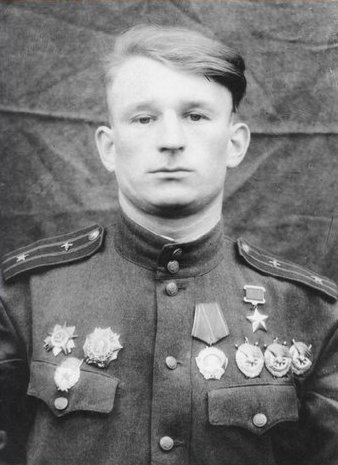
- Born: 15 November [O.S. 2 November] 1917; Kolesovo village, Oryol Governorate, Russian Empire
- Died: 8 September 1946 (aged 28); Brest Region, Byelorussian SSR, USSR
- Military career
- Allegiance: Soviet Union
- Branch: Soviet Air Force
- Service years: 1937 – 1946
- Rank: Major
- Unit: 76th Guards Attack Aviation Regiment
- Conflicts: World War II
- Awards: Hero of the Soviet Union (twice)

Mikhail Tikhonovich Stepanishchev (Russian: Михаил Тихонович Степанищев; 15 November [O.S. 2 November] 1917 – 8 September 1946) was a Soviet ground-attack pilot and navigator during World War II who was twice awarded the title Hero of the Soviet Union.

== Early life ==
Stepanishchev was born on 15 November [O.S. 2 November] 1917 to a family of Russian farmers shortly before the fall of the Russian Empire. The family struggled after the death of the father, so he began working in agriculture from an early age. In 1930 his family moved to Donbass, where he completed his seventh grade of school in 1932 before entering trade school in Kadievka. He then worked at a mine and at a steam engine construction facility before graduating from the Voroshilovgrad aeroclub and subsequently entering the military in 1937.

== Military career ==
Having entered the military in December 1937, he went on to graduate from the Voroshilovgrad Military Aviation School of Pilots in November 1939 before he was assigned to the 160th Reserve Aviation Regiment. In October 1940 he was transferred to the 211th Close-Range Bomber Aviation Regiment, and immediately once Nazi Germany began invading the Soviet Union in June 1941 he started flying combat sorties on the Su-2.

In September he and the rest of his regiment were withdrawn from the warfront to undergo training to fly the Il-2 in Saratov. He was sent back to the front in May 1942 as a pilot in the 820th Attack Aviation Regiment, but in June he was sent to the 211th Attack Aviation Regiment. On 12 June 1942 he was shot down over the Kharkov oblast and suffered serious injuries from the emergency landing. With a concussion and spinal cord injuries, he was forced to remain in the hospital until July. After he was released from the hospital he became a squadron adjutant in the 686th Attack Aviation Regiment, during which he saw combat in the Battle of Stalingrad. He left the position in January to be retrained to fly a different variant of the Il-2. In February 1943 he was transferred to the 225th Attack Aviation Regiment, which was honored with the Guards designation and renamed as the 76th Guards Attack Aviation Regiment the next month. While initially a flight commander, he quickly received several promotions, first to the position of deputy squadron commander, then squadron commander, regimental navigator, and eventually to deputy commander of his regiment.

He was first nominated for the title Hero of the Soviet Union on 24 April 1944 for flying 127 sorties. He was awarded his first gold star on 26 October 1944. He was nominated for the title again on 9 April 1945 after flying 222 missions and was awarded the title after the end of the war on 29 June 1945. In total he flew 234 sorties, almost all of them on the Il-2. During the war he led many successful missions that inflicted heavy losses on enemy equipment and personnel.

After the end of the war he remained in the air force, and stayed as the deputy commander of his regiment until June 1946 when he was made the regimental navigator. He was buried in Baranovichi after he committed suicide with a service pistol on 8 September 1946.

== Awards and honors ==
- Twice Hero of the Soviet Union (26 October 1944 and 29 June 1945)
- Order of Lenin (26 October 1944)
- Four Order of the Red Banner (17 August 1943, 3 July 1944, 2 November 1944, and 2 April 1945)
- Order of Bogdan Khmelnitsky 3rd class (2 March 1945)
- Order of Alexander Nevsky (22 October 1943)
- Order of the Patriotic War 1st class (24 December 1943)
