= Paltsevo, Leningrad Oblast =

Rural locality in Vyborgsky District, Russia

Coordinates: 60°45′36″N 28°53′24″E

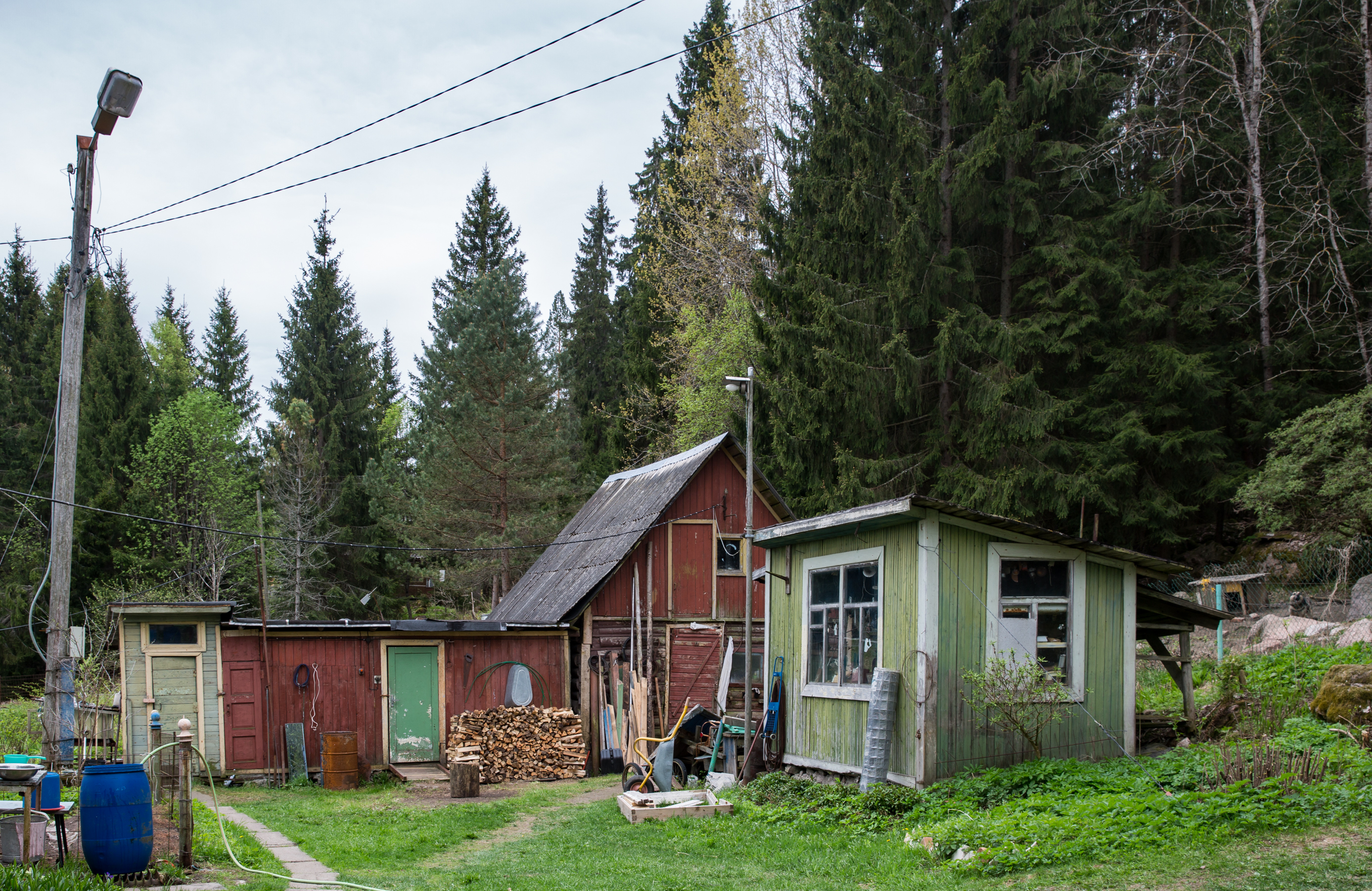
Residence built after the Finnish-Soviet Continuation war

Paltsevo (Russian: Па́льцево; Finnish: Tali) is a rural locality on Karelian Isthmus, in Vyborgsky District of Leningrad Oblast, where the battle of Tali-Ihantala took place in 1944, and a station of the Vyborg-Joensuu railroad.
