= Ilya Shmelyov =

Soviet fighter pilot

- Илья Васильевич Шмелёв
- Born: 2 August [O.S. 20 July] 1917; Moscow, Moscow Governorate, Russian Empire
- Died: 25 December 1979 (aged 62); Moscow, RSFSR, USSR
- Military career
- Allegiance: Soviet Union
- Branch: Soviet Air Force
- Service years: 1938—1957
- Rank: Colonel
- Conflicts: World War II
- Awards: Hero of the Soviet Union

Ilya Vasilyevich Shmelyov (Russian: Илья Васильевич Шмелёв; 2 August [O.S. 20 July] 1917 — 25 December 1979) was a Soviet fighter pilot during World War II. Awarded the title Hero of the Soviet Union on 23 August 1943 for his initial victories, by the end of the war his tally stood at an estimated 27 solo and 10 shared shootdowns, although more conservative estimates put the figure at 26 solo and one shared.
