= Pyotr Shelepov =

Hero of the Soviet Union

- Пётр Емельянович Шелепов
- Born: 14 July 1920; Bogdano-Verbky, Pavlogradsky Uyezd, Yekaterinoslav Governorate, Ukrainian SSR
- Died: 3 September 1983 (aged 63); Verkhnodniprovsk, Dnipropetrovsk Oblast, Ukrainian SSR, Soviet Union
- Military career
- Allegiance: Soviet Union
- Branch: Red Army
- Service years: 1940–1946
- Rank: Red Army man
- Unit: 37th Guards Rifle Division
- Conflicts: World War II; Berlin Offensive
- Awards: Hero of the Soviet Union

Pyotr Emelyanovich Shelepov (Russian: Пётр Емельянович Шелепов; 14 July 1920 – 3 September 1983) was a Red Army man and a Hero of the Soviet Union. Shelepov was awarded the title for his actions in the Berlin Offensive, in which he and others captured a height and then held it against several counterattacks. Postwar, he became a prosecutor.

== Early life ==
Shelepov was born on 14 July 1920 in the village of Bogdano-Verbky in Yekaterinoslav Governorate, now in Synelnykove Raion of Dnipropetrovsk Oblast, in a peasant family of Russian ethnicity. Shelepov graduated from seven classes and worked on the local kolkhoz. He was drafted into the Red Army in 1940.

== World War II ==
Shelepov fought in World War II from June 1941 following the German invasion of the Soviet Union. He became a rifleman in the 109th Guards Rifle Regiment of the 37th Guards Rifle Division. On 23 March 1945, he was awarded the Medal "For Courage" for his actions. He fought in the Berlin Offensive in April and May 1945. On 20 April, during the crossing of the West Oder near Kołbaskowo, Shelepov and other soldiers captured German trenches. According to his Hero of the Soviet Union citation, they captured an important height and held it against six counterattacks. This allowed the main forces of the regiment to cross the river. Shelepov killed twelve German soldiers and a machine-gun crew with grenades. Shelepov became a member of the Communist Party of the Soviet Union afterwards. On 29 June 1945, he was awarded the title Hero of the Soviet Union and the Order of Lenin. On 2 October 1945, Shelepov received the Order of the Red Star for his actions.

== Postwar ==
In 1946, Shelepov was demobilized and returned to civilian life. He worked in the district prosecutor's office in Dniprodzerzhynsk. He became the prosecutor of Synelnykove Raion, then Verkhnodniprovsk Raion. Shelepov later became prosecutor of Marhanets. He graduated from the Kharkiv Law Institute in 1959 and lived in Verkhnodniprovsk, teaching in an agricultural college. Shelepov died on 3 September 1983.
