= Yakov Studennikov =

Yakov Stepanovich Studennikov
- Native name: Яков Степанович Студенников
- Born: 15 March 1910; Mokhovoe (Kolpnyansky district of the Oryol Oblast)
- Died: 8 January 1987 (aged 76) Makeevka, Ukrainian SSR, Soviet Union
- Allegiance: Soviet Union
- Branch: Red Army
- Service years: 1941–1945
- Rank: Senior Sergeant
- Conflicts: World War II
- Awards: Hero of the Soviet Union

Yakov Stepanovich Studennikov (Russian: Яков Степанович Студенников); 15 March 1910 – 8 January 1987) was a Red Army soldier during World War II who was awarded the title Hero of the Soviet Union for his performance as a machine gunner during the Battle of Kursk. Demobilized as a starshina following the end of the war, he worked as a railway security guard postwar.

== Biography ==
Yakov Studennikov was born on 15 March 1910 in the village of Mokhovoe (now the Kolpnyansky district of the Oryol Oblast). Russian by nationality. Origin from workers. 4th grade education. Prior to being drafted into the army, he worked as a tractor driver. Married. He was not a Communist Party member.

On 15 May, Studennikov was called up by the Kolpnyansky RVC of the Oryol oblast to serve in the Red Army. Since 25 June 1941 he fought on the fronts of the Great Patriotic War. In battles he was wounded three times.

In July 1943, Senior sergeant Yakov Studennikov was a machine gunner in the 3rd Battalion of the 1019th Infantry Regiment of the 307th Rifle Division of the 48th Army of the Central Front. He distinguished himself during the Battle of Kursk. July 5–7, 1943. Studennikov in the battle near the Ponyri station, remained the only one in the ranks of the entire team, was wounded three times, but continued to fire machine guns, repulsing ten attacks by the Nazis, who failed to surround the machine gunner, and destroyed more than 300 enemy soldiers.

By decree of the Presidium of the Supreme Soviet of the USSR "On conferring the title of Hero of the Soviet Union to generals, officers, sergeants and privates of the Red Army" dated 15 January 1944 for "exemplary performance of combat missions of command on the front of the fight against the German invaders and the courage and heroism shown at the same time" senior Sergeant Yakov Studennikov was awarded the title of Hero of the Soviet Union with the Order of Lenin and the Gold Star medal, number 2985.

At the end of May 1945, he was expelled from the 1st Guards Red Banner Mortar and Artillery School (named after Leonid Krasin) for health reasons.

In June 1945 he was sent, and in July 1945 he was expelled from the school of radio specialists of the armored forces of the Red Army.

After the end of the war, on 20 October 1945, Studennikov was demobilized with the rank of starshina. He lived in Makeevka, Ukrainian SSR, where he served in the MVD battalion guarding the railway station where coal trains were loaded. In his later years, he continued to serve with the VOKhR, the civilian security guards, at the same station before retiring. Studennikov died in Makeevka on 8 January 1987, where he is buried.

A bust of Studennikov was erected in the village of Kolpna.

== Awards ==
- Medal "For the Victory over Germany in the Great Patriotic War 1941–1945" (order of the Moscow City Military Commissariat dated August 11, 1945)
- Order of the Patriotic War First Class
- other medals

== Books ==
- Shkadov, Ivan, ed. (1988). Герои Советского Союза: краткий биографический словарь [Heroes of the Soviet Union: A Brief Biographical Dictionary] (in Russian). Vol. 2. Moscow: Voenizdat. ISBN 5203005362.
- А. Вялкин, Н. Кирилловская (1963). За землю родную. Vol. 1. Орёл: Орловское книжное издательство. pp. 249–251.
- Фролов П. И., Пирогов В. А., Макушев А. Ф. (1985). Боевое созвездие орловцев. Vol. 1. Тула: Воениздат. pp. 295–296.
