= Ivan Sytov =

Soviet flying ace (1916–1943)

Ivan Nikitovich Sytov
- Иван Никитович Сытов
- Born: 13 June 1916; Lipovka, Saratovsky Uyezd, Saratov Governorate, Russian Empire
- Died: 13 October 1943 (aged 27); Zaporozhye, Ukrainian SSR, USSR
- Military career
- Allegiance: Soviet Union
- Branch: Soviet Air Force
- Service years: 1938–1943
- Rank: Senior Lieutenant
- Unit: 5th Guards Fighter Aviation Regiment
- Conflicts: World War II; Eastern Front
- Awards: Hero of the Soviet Union

Ivan Nikitovich Sytov (Russian: Иван Никитович Сытов; 13 June 1916 – 13 October 1943) was a Soviet flying ace, credited with 25 solo and three shared victories.

Initially serving with Stalingrad's fighter school, Sytov then posted to 788th Fighter Aviation Regiment, where he claimed at least one Bf 109 in September 1942. Lieutenant Ivan Sytov then joined 5th Guards Fighter Aviation Regiment in December 1942.

Sytov fought during the Battle of Stalingrad and Battle of Kursk, scoring the majority of his kills during this period. After intensive operations on the Kalinin Front, the unit withdrew to equip with the new Lavochkin La-5.

On 13 October 1943 Sytov was shot down and killed by JG 52s Oberfeldwebel Walter Jahnke. Some Soviet sources claim he rammed a Bf 109, but according to German records no such incident occurred.
