= Nikolay Shmelkov =

- Николай Иванович Шмельков
- Born: May 5, 1912; Selivanovo station (now Krasnaya Gorbatka), Vladimir Governorate, Russian Empire
- Died: March 24, 1967 (aged 54); Krasnaya Gorbatka, Vladimir Oblast, USSR
- Military career
- Allegiance: Soviet Union
- Branch: Soviet Air Force
- Service years: 1930–1945
- Rank: Colonel
- Commands: 297th Fighter Division of PVO
- Conflicts: Spanish Civil War; World War II; Winter War; Eastern Front
- Awards: Hero of Soviet Union; Order of Lenin; Order of the Red Banner

Nikolay Ivanovich Shmelkov (May 5, 1912 – March 24, 1967) was a Soviet military pilot, who participated in the Civil War in Spain, the Winter War and Great Patriotic War and was awarded the title of Hero of Soviet Union in 1936. He reached the rank of colonel.

== Childhood and youth ==
Nikolay Shmelkov was born at May 5, 1912, on Selivanovo railway station (now Krasnaya Gorbatka in Vladimir Oblast), to a family of a railwayman. In 1914 the family moved to Tulun station. Since 1928 till 1929 Nikolay studied in a school of factory and plant apprenticeship in Nizhneudinsk. Then he started working as a turner's apprentice at Sestroretsk instrumental factory.

== Army service ==
Shmelkov was conscripted into the Army in November 1930. He graduated from 8th School of Aircraft Motorists of the Baltic Naval Depot of the Naval Forces of the Baltic Sea in 1931. Since April 1931 he served as aviation motorist in 21st Independent Aviation Squadron of Leningrad Military District in Petergof. In the end of 1931 Nikolay volunteered to become a pilot, was sent to a flight school and in 1933 graduated from 11th Military Pilot School of the Air Force of the Red Army (later Lugansk Higher Military Aviation School of Navigators) in Luhansk. Since July 1933 Shmelkov became a pilot in 16th Fighter Squadron of Air Force of the Ukrainian Military District, based at Kirovo (now Pivnichne in Donetsk Oblast), since June 1934 he became a pilot of 109th Fighter Squadron of 81st Aviation Brigade in Kiev.

In September 1936 he volunteered to fight on the Republican side in the Spanish Civil War. He arrived to Spain in the first group of Soviet volunteer pilots. Shmelkov participated in the aerial defence of Madrid from October 1936 to January 1937, flying a Polikarpov I-15. He has made 49 combat sorties, spending 66 hours in total. The data on number of his aerial victories is highly contradictory. According to, he downed 4 airplanes personally and 2 in team, according to, 5 aircraft personally. In January 1937 he returned to USSR prematurely because of health issues (he was wounded).

At December 31, 1936, lieutenant Nikolay Shmelkov was awarded the title of Hero of Soviet Union and Order of Lenin for his heroism.

Since March till November 1937 he commanded a unit and ait detachment in 65th Fighter Squadron in Air Force of Kiev Military District, then he was sent to study. In 1938 he graduated from Lipetsk Higher Aviation Courses for Improvement of Command Staff of the Air Force of the Red Army. He was at once promoted from lieutenant to major in February 1938.

He was elected as deputy into the Supreme Soviet of Russia.

Since August 1938 Shmelkov served as the assistant commander of 54th Fighter Brigade in the Air Force of Leningrad Military District (headquartered at Gorelovo airbase). At this position he participated in the Winter War, showing himself as proactive commander and good organizer. For this he was awarded the Order of Red Banner. Since April 1940 he became the commander of the brigade. Since August 1940 Shmelkov became deputy commander of 1st Mixed Aviation Division (Leningrad Military District), since the beginning of June 1941 - acting commander of 145th Fighter Regiment of this division.

At this position Shmelkov met the beginning of the war between Soviet Union and Nazi Germany. His regiment fought in the Air Force of the 14th Army (Northern Front, later Karelian Front), was based at Shonguy airbase, defending Murmansk and Kirov Railway. He flew a Polikarpov I-16. During a bombardment in August 1941 he suffered a concussion. His actions as regiment commander were judged unsatisfactory because of high casualties against Luftwaffe, so he was sent to study after the hospital.

In 1942 Nikolay Shmelkov graduated from Courses of Improvement of Command Staff in Military Academy of Command and Navigator Staff of the Air Force of the Red Army. Since May 1942 he served as deputy commander of 5th Reserve Aviation Brigade of Air Force of Siberian Military District in Novosibirsk, in September–October temporarily being its acting commander. Since October 1942 he commanded 297th Fighter Division of PVO of Transbaikal Zone of Anti-Air Defence, headquartered in Chita. Since April till June 1944 he was on probation in action in 311th Fighter Division of the 2nd Air Army, 1st Ukrainian Front on the position of deputy commander for flight operations. In July 1944 he was removed from the command for a lot of service drawbacks and low level of combat training in the division. After being in reserve for some time he was assigned to serve as deputy commander of 234th Fighter Division of 6th Fighter Corps (16th Air Army, 1st Belorussian Front). He participated in Vistula-Oder Offensive and East Pomeranian Offensive, but did not use his chance to restore reputation. In March 1945 he was again removed from command for "systematic drunkenness, unwillingness to follow the directions of higher commanders and Military Soviet of Front, unwillingness to work and fly, and also loss of authority among subordinates", and sent from the front to reserve of personnel department of Air Force of the Red Army. During the war he was never promoted or awarded. Data on his victories during the WWII is contradictory and unsupported by published documents.

In August 1945 colonel Shmelkov was discharged.

After discharge Shmelkov returned to his birthplace and dwelt there until his death. He died at March 24, 1967. He is buried in Krasnaya Gorbatka in Vladimir Oblast.

== Awards ==
- Gold Star of Hero of Soviet Union No.25
- Order of Lenin
- Order of the Red Banner
- Medal "For Battle Merit"
- Medal "For the Defence of the Soviet Transarctic"
- Medal "For the Capture of Berlin"
- Medal "For the Victory over Germany in the Great Patriotic War 1941–1945"
- commemorative medals

== Memory ==
- A street is named after Shmelkov in Krasnaya Gorbatka, a memory plaque was installed there, and a Su-9 airplane was installed as a monument to him in the town.
- A street in Tulun is named after Shmelkov.
