= Vladimir Shalimov =

Soviet pilot (1908–1942)

Vladimir Yegorovich Shalimov
- Владимир Егорович Шалимов
- Born: 8 August 1908; Bolshiye village, Russian Empire
- Died: 23 July 1942 (aged 33); Uritsk, Leningrad Region, USSR
- Military career
- Allegiance: Soviet Union
- Branch: Soviet Air Force
- Rank: Guard Major
- Conflicts: Second Sino-Japanese War; World War II; Winter War; Eastern Front †
- Awards: Hero of the Soviet Union

Vladimir Yegorovich Shalimov (Russian: Владимир Егорович Шалимов; 8 August 1908 – 23 July 1942) was a Soviet pilot who was posthumously awarded the title Hero of the Soviet Union for executing a "fire taran" attack when he intentionally flew his plane into enemy positions on the ground after his aircraft was bombarded by anti-aircraft fire.

== Early life ==
Shalimov was born on 8 August 1908 to a Ukrainian peasant family in the village of Bolshiye within the Russian Empire. After graduating from school he worked at a tram depot in Kharkiv before joining the Red Army in 1929.

== Military career ==
Shalimov enlisted in the Red Army in 1929 and entered studies at the Odessa Military Aviation School where he graduated in 1933 after becoming a member of the Communist Party in 1932. In 1938 he was deployed to China to fight in the Second Sino-Japanese War but returned to the Soviet Union in 1939 after the start of the Winter War in which he fought in. He was one of the first people to become an experienced pilot on the Ilyushin Il-2 ground attack aircraft.

After the German invasion of the Soviet Union in 1941 Shalimov was deployed to the Western Front in June where he fought until her was sent to the Leningrad Front as a squadron commander in the 174th Assault Aviation Regiment. The unit was renamed the 15th Guards Ground Attack Aviation Regiment for showing heroism in the battle of Leningrad in early March. After the death of the regimental commander in spring Shalimov was promoted to the rank of Major and put in command of the regiment.

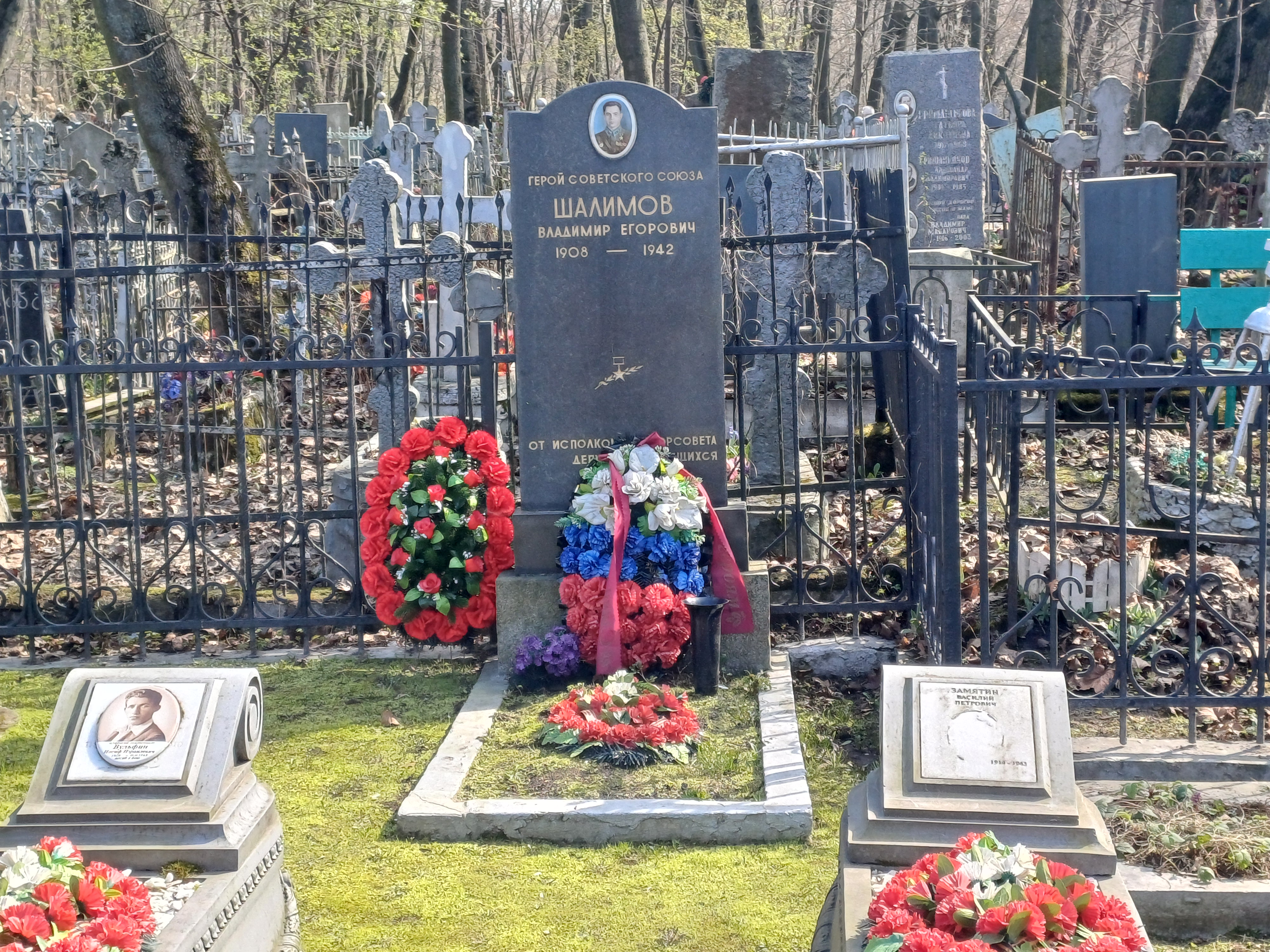
Tomb of Vladimir Shalimov

During a combat mission on July 23, 1942 Shalimov's plane took a direct hit from an anti-aircraft shell, setting it aflame; as his aircraft was plummeting to the ground he chose to ram it into an enemy target on the ground in what the Soviets referred to as a "fire taran" attack. He was killed immediately from the explosion of the ramming attack. Residents of German-occupied Uritsk quietly buried his disfigured body in a field near a house. His body was reburied in 1965 with full military honors in Krasnenkoye Cemetery.

He had executed 52 combat sorties in the World War II in which he destroyed twenty parked enemy aircraft, fifteen tanks, 55 cargo wagons, 76 ground vehicles, and over 100 mortar launch points in addition to shooting down one enemy plane in aerial combat. For bravery shown on combat missions and heroism in his final act of battle he was posthumously awarded the title Hero of the Soviet Union with the Order of Lenin by decree of the Supreme Soviet on 10 February 1943. During his service he was awarded the Order of the Red Star in 1941 and Orders of the Red Banner in 1940 and 1942.

== See also ==
- Aerial ramming
- Kamikaze
- Nikolai Gastello
- Ismailbek Taranchiev
