= Sergey Safronov (pilot) =

Russian aviator (1919–1983)

Sergei Ivanovich Safronov
- Сергей Иванович Сафронов
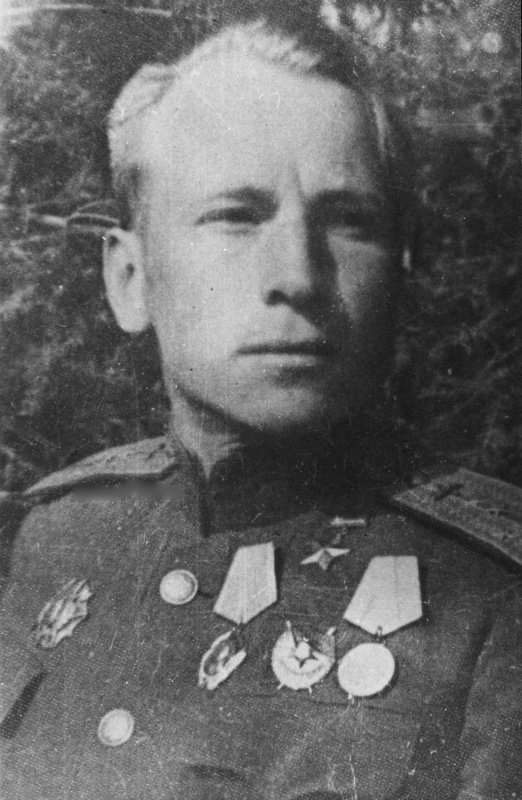
- Born: 25 August 1918; Pilekshevo, Nizhny Novgorod Governorate, Soviet Union
- Died: 29 September 1983 (aged 65); Nizhny Novgorod, Soviet Union
- Military career
- Allegiance: Soviet Union
- Branch: Soviet Air Force
- Service years: 1938 — 1945
- Rank: Major
- Unit: 293rd Fighter Aviation Regiment
- Conflicts: World War II; Eastern Front
- Awards: Hero of the Soviet Union

Sergey Ivanovich Safronov (Russian: Серге́й Ива́нович Сафро́нов; 25 August 1919 – 29 September 1983) was a Russian aviator who was given the title Hero of the Soviet Union. According to Thomas Polak, Safronov shot down 31 enemy aircraft during World War II.

He was born in Pilekshevo, Nizhny Novgorod on 25 August 1919. In 1938 Safronov joined the army. In 1939 he graduated from the Engels Military Air School.

During World War II he participated in air combats in Kuban, shot down aircraft in the Kursk Salient, and participated in the battle in Stalingrad. By the end of World War II he had been promoted to Major. After the war ended, he worked in the Saratov aeroclub as a flying instructor. Yuri Gagarin was one of his students. He later became the flight commander of Gagarin.

Safronov died on 29 September 1983 in Nizhny Novgorod.

== Bibliography ==
- Polak, Tomas (with Christopher Shores). Stalin's Falcons: The Aces of the Red Star : A Tribute to the Notable Fighter Pilots of the Soviet Air Forces 1918-1953. Grub Street, 1999. ISBN 1902304012, 9781902304014.
- Tsymbal, Nikolay Andreyevich (Николай Андреевич Цымбал). First Man in Space: The Life and Achievement of Yuri Gagarin : a Collection. Progress Publishers (Moscow), 1984.
