= Ivan Ilyich Sidorenko =

Soviet soldier (1907–1984)

- Иван Ильич Сидоренко
- Born: 19 October 1907; Kupiansk, Kharkov Oblast
- Died: 6 September 1984 (aged 76); Kupiansk
- Military career
- Allegiance: Soviet Union
- Branch: Red Army
- Service years: 1941—1944
- Rank: Sergeant
- Unit: 31st Rifle Division
- Conflicts: World War II
- Awards: Hero of the Soviet Union; Order of Lenin; Medal for Courage

Ivan Ilyich Sidorenko (Russian: Иван Ильич Сидоренко; 19 October 1907 – 6 September 1984) was a Red Army sergeant during World War II and a Hero of the Soviet Union. He was awarded the title in recognition of his actions during the Battle of the Dnieper, in which he distinguished himself through small-unit leadership.

== Biography ==
A Ukrainian, Ivan Ilyich Sidorenko was born on 19 October 1907 in the city of Kupiansk, now in Kharkiv Oblast, the son of a laborer. Completing primary school, he worked at a brickworks in the mechanical workshop. Conscripted into the Red Army in October 1941, Sidorenko fought in combat from November of that year. He was involved in fighting on the Southern, Transcaucasian, North Caucasian, Southwestern and Steppe (from 20 October 1943 the 2nd Ukrainian) fronts. During this period he fought in the defensive battles of 1941, the Battle of the Caucasus, and the liberation of Left-Bank Ukraine. By August 1943 he rose to the rank of junior sergeant, serving as a squad leader in a mortar company of the 248th Rifle Regiment of the 31st Rifle Division, part of the 46th Army of the 2nd Ukrainian Front. Sidorenko first distinguished himself on 26 August during the breakthrough of German defenses in the area of the village of Diskovka, Kharkiv Oblast, emplacing a mortar under fire. Credited with the destruction of two firing positions at point-blank range and killing eleven soldiers, he was awarded the Medal for Courage on 9 October in recognition of this action.

Sidorenko distinguished himself again in the Battle of the Dnieper and the fighting to expand the bridgeheads on the left bank of the river, this time leading a squad in a rifle company of the regiment. On the night of 27 September he and his squad assault-crossed the river near the village of Soshinovka (now Verkhnodniprovsk Raion) in Dnipropetrovsk Oblast and rapidly took the first German trenches. In this action Sidorenko was credited with personally killing "more than ten soldiers of the enemy." In subsequent fighting on 1 October Sidorenko took over from the wounded platoon commander and confidently led his men in repulsing German counterattacks. On 25 October he led the platoon in a charge that captured the outskirts of the village of Krinichki and German positions, securing the further advance of the battalion. Seriously wounded on the next day, Sidorenko was evacuated from the front. In recognition of his actions, Sidorenko's regimental commander recommended him for the title Hero of the Soviet Union, the highest award of the country. He was awarded the title and the Order of Lenin on 22 February 1944 for his "exemplary execution of combat missions" and "demonstrated courage and heroism." After recovering, he was discharged from the hospital on 20 November with the rank of sergeant as unfit for further service due to his wounds.

Returning to Kupiansk, Sidorenko worked at a factory. He died on 6 September 1984.

Hero of the Soviet Union citation

In the ranks of the 1st Rifle Company Comrade Sidorenko, during the night of 26–27 September 1943, was one of the first to assault-cross the Dnieper. When the battalion, massed on the right bank, went over to the offensive, Comrade Sidorenko leading with the cry "Hurrah, forward for the homeland!," burst into the trenches of the enemy, carrying the soldiers forward by his example. In hand-to-hand fighting he personally wiped out more than ten enemy soldiers. Subsequently, in the expansion of the brigade he repulsed multiple attempts of the enemy to retake the lost positions. Comrade Sidorenko, acting in concert with his platoon, steadfastly defended his line. On 1 October 1943, while repulsing five attacks by the numerically superior enemy, he took the place of the platoon leader, who had left the ranks, bravely roused his soldiers to counterattack, inspiring the rest with his example, thanks to which the defensive line of the enemy was broken and the regiment reached the northwestern outskirts of the village of Auly. In the fighting on the approaches to the Dnipropetrovsk Oblast district center of Krinichki on 25 October 1943 Comrade Sidorenko, using the pre-dawn darkness, with the platoon made his way right up to the trenches of the enemy. Shining light on the ground, the enemy discovered Sidorenko's platoon and opened fire on them. Comrade Sidorenko, with the cry "Platoon, follow me! Forward, for the homeland!," burst into the enemy trenches, where he killed twelve enemy soldiers himself. Thanks to his decisive charge enemy resistance was smashed and the further advance of the battalion was secured. For his steadfastness and heroism in the fighting on the right bank of the Dnieper Comrade Sidorenko is deserving of the award of the title Hero of the Soviet Union.
