= Vadim Khakhalov =

Soviet general

- Вадим Николаевич Хахалов
- Born: 3 December 1932; Mogzon, Chita oblast, USSR (now Trans-Baikal Territory)
- Died: 5 September 1981 (aged 48); Farah Province, Afghanistan
- Military career
- Allegiance: Soviet Union
- Branch: Soviet Army
- Service years: 1951–1981
- Rank: Major General
- Unit: 40th Army
- Awards: Order of Lenin; Honoured Military Pilot of the USSR

Vadim Nikolaevich Khakhalov (Russian: Вадим Николаевич Хахалов; 3 December 1932 – 5 September 1981) was a Soviet Major-general of Aviation killed in Afghanistan.

== Biography ==
He graduated from the Stalingrad Military Aviation Pilot School. Graduate of the Y.A. Gagarin Air Force Academy. He walked from cadet to major general of aviation.

The last duty station before a trip to Afghanistan is the post of deputy commander of the Air Force of the Turkestan Military District for fighter aviation, head of department.

Khakhalov arrived in Afghanistan in July 1981.

From the first days of the war in Afghanistan, Major-General Khakhalov was engaged in the issues of aviation support of military operations of the 40th Army. And since the summer of 1981, he, as part of the task force of the District Air Force, has been directly organizing aviation operations on Afghan soil.

On September 5, 1981, during a combat operation in the Lur Koh mountain range in the province of Farah, V. N. Khakhalov personally flew a Mi-8 helicopter from the 302nd separate helicopter squadron (crew: Lieutenant Alferov, Major A.I. Shramko and captain Shashin) to assess the effectiveness of the Su-25 attack aircraft. During the flight 40 km north of the city of Farah, the crew found the enemy command center and decided to destroy it. After the launch of the NURS at the exit from the attack, the helicopter was hit by an enemy anti-aircraft machine gun, lost control and exploded in a collision with a rock. The crew died. To return the bodies of the general and the crew of the helicopter, the 5th Guards Motorized Rifle Division conducted a special operation, during which 8 Soviet soldiers were killed.

He was buried at the 9th military section of the Kuntsevo Cemetery of Moscow.

== Awards ==
- Order of Lenin
- Order "For Service to the Homeland in the Armed Forces of the USSR" 3rd class
- Medal "From the grateful Afghan people"
- Diploma of the Supreme Soviet of the USSR

== Memory ==
The street in the Zheleznodorozhny district of the city of Ulan-Ude bears his name.

== Bibliography ==
- Книга памяти о советских воинах, погибших в Афганистане: В 2-х т. Т. 2: М—Я. Moscow: Voenizdat. 1995.
- Stefanovsky, Gennady (1993). Пламя афганской войны. Moscow: Voenizdat.
