= Nikolay Fyodorovich Kuznetsov =

Soviet fighter ace and cosmonaut training official

Nikolai Fyodorovich Kuznetsov
- Николай Фёдорович Кузнецов
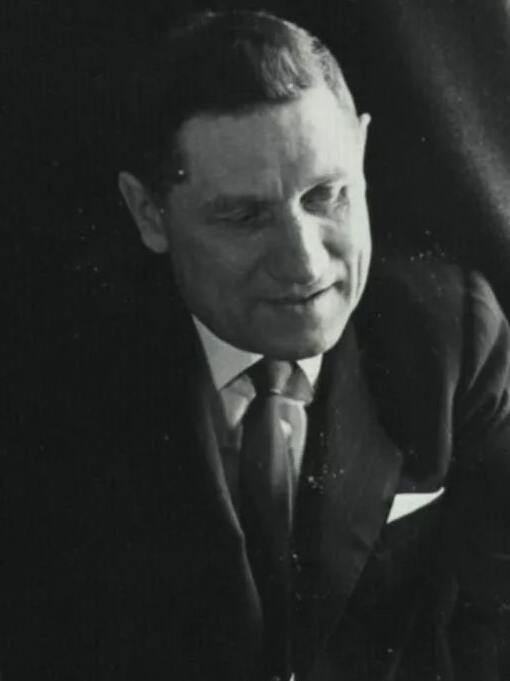
- Kuznetsov in 1964
- Born: 26 December 1916; Petrograd, Russian Empire
- Died: 5 March 2000 (aged 83); Star City, Moscow Oblast, Russia
- Burial place: Preobrazhenskoye Cemetery, Moscow
- Alma mater: Frunze Military Academy; Military Academy of the General Staff of the Armed Forces of the Soviet Union
- Military career
- Allegiance: Soviet Union
- Branch: Soviet Air Forces
- Service years: 1935–1978
- Rank: Major General of Aviation
- Commands: 16th Fighter Aviation Regiment; Grozny Military Aviation School of Pilots; Chernigov Higher Military Aviation School of Pilots; Cosmonaut Training Center
- Conflicts: Winter War; Eastern Front (World War II); Korean War
- Awards: Hero of the Soviet Union; Order of Lenin twice; Order of the Red Banner four times; Order of Alexander Nevsky; Order of the Patriotic War, 1st class; Order of the Red Star three times
- Other work: writer; adviser to NPO Energia

Nikolai Fyodorovich Kuznetsov (Russian: Николай Фёдорович Кузнецов; 26 December 1916 – 5 March 2000) was a Soviet fighter pilot, flying ace, military commander and writer. A major general of aviation, he was awarded the title Hero of the Soviet Union in 1943 for his service during the Eastern Front of the Second World War. After the war he commanded fighter and aviation training units, took part in the Korean War, and from 1963 to 1972 headed the Cosmonaut Training Center.

== Early life and military service ==
Kuznetsov was born on 26 December 1916, 13 December Old Style, in Petrograd, into a working-class family. After completing seven years of school and a factory training school, he worked as a metal turner at the M. I. Kalinin factory in Leningrad.

He joined the Red Army in September 1935. In 1937 he graduated from the Leningrad Military School of Aviation Technicians. During the Winter War of 1939–1940 he served as a flight technician in the 68th Fighter Aviation Regiment. He later trained as a pilot and graduated from the Kacha Military Aviation School in May 1941.

== Second World War ==
After the German invasion of the Soviet Union, Kuznetsov served as a fighter pilot, flight commander and deputy squadron commander in the 191st Fighter Aviation Regiment. He fought on several fronts, including the Northern, Leningrad, Kalinin, Western and Southwestern Fronts. In November 1942 he was assigned to the 436th Fighter Aviation Regiment, later redesignated the 67th Guards Fighter Aviation Regiment.

On 6 January 1943, Kuznetsov was wounded in the chest during an air battle after his aircraft was hit and caught fire. He managed to return to Soviet-held territory and make a forced landing in a forest, after which he spent several months in hospital.

By early 1943 he had flown 213 combat sorties and was credited in his award nomination with 17 individual and 12 shared aerial victories. On 1 May 1943 he was awarded the title Hero of the Soviet Union, together with the Order of Lenin and the Gold Star medal. Later research credited him with 21 individual and 12 shared victories over the course of the war.

During the final phase of the war he served as deputy commander and inspector pilot for aerial gunnery and piloting technique in the 67th Guards Fighter Aviation Regiment. By May 1945 he had flown 252 combat sorties and taken part in 99 air battles.

== Postwar career ==
After the war Kuznetsov continued serving in the Soviet Air Forces. Until June 1946 he was deputy commander of a fighter aviation regiment in the Central Group of Forces in Austria. In 1949 he graduated from the Frunze Military Academy, and from December 1949 commanded the 16th Fighter Aviation Regiment of the Soviet air defence forces near Ryazan.

From January to June 1952 he participated in the Korean War as commander of the 16th Fighter Aviation Regiment, flying 27 combat sorties on the Mikoyan-Gurevich MiG-15. From 1952 to 1954 he served as an inspector pilot in the combat training administration of the Soviet Air Forces. In 1956 he graduated from the Military Academy of the General Staff of the Armed Forces of the Soviet Union. He subsequently headed the Grozny Military Aviation School of Pilots and then the Chernigov Higher Military Aviation School of Pilots.

== Cosmonaut Training Center ==
In November 1963 Kuznetsov was appointed head of the Air Force Cosmonaut Training Center, later known as the Yuri Gagarin Cosmonaut Training Center. He led the institution until June 1972. The official chronology of the training center lists him as the new head of the center in 1963.

After leaving the training center, Kuznetsov became an adviser to the chief designer of NPO Energia on military space programmes. He defended a candidate dissertation in 1963 and a doctoral dissertation in military sciences in 1974. He retired from active military service in June 1978.

Kuznetsov lived in Star City, Moscow Oblast. He died there on 5 March 2000 and was buried at Preobrazhenskoye Cemetery in Moscow.

== Awards and honours ==
Kuznetsov's decorations and honours included:

- Hero of the Soviet Union – 1 May 1943
- Order of Lenin – twice, 29 October 1941 and 1 May 1943
- Order of the Red Banner – four times, 10 February 1942, 6 August 1944, 16 June 1945 and 30 December 1956
- Order of Alexander Nevsky – 29 March 1945
- Order of the Patriotic War, 1st class – 11 March 1985
- Order of the Red Star – three times, 7 April 1940, 3 December 1941 and 17 May 1951
- Medal "For Battle Merit" – 6 November 1945
- Medal "For the Defence of Leningrad"
- Medal "For the Victory over Germany in the Great Patriotic War 1941–1945"
- Merited Military Pilot of the USSR – 8 July 1967

In 2015 a memorial plaque honouring three pilots and Second World War veterans, Georgy Beregovoy, Nikolai Kuznetsov and Pavel Belyayev, was unveiled on a building in Star City.

== Works ==
Kuznetsov wrote several books on the Second World War and the Soviet space programme, including:

- Kuznetsov, N. F. (1970). Фронт над землёй [The Front Above the Earth] (in Russian). Moscow: Voenizdat.
- Kuznetsov, N. F. (1987). Годы испытаний [Years of Trials] (in Russian). Leningrad: Lenizdat.
- Kuznetsov, N. F. (1988). Главный и Первый [The Chief and the First] (in Russian). Moscow: Sovetsky Pisatel.
- Kuznetsov, N. F. (1994). Правда о гибели Гагарина [The Truth about Gagarin's Death] (in Russian). Domodedovo.
