= Yevgeny Kabanov =

Yevgeny Ivanovich Kabanov
- Евгений Иванович Кабанов
- Born: 20 November 1918; Begichevo, Borisoglebsky Uyezd, Tambov Governorate, Russian Empire
- Died: 19 June 1989 (aged 70); Moscow, Soviet Union
- Burial place: Mitinskoe Cemetery
- Military career
- Allegiance: Soviet Union
- Branch: Soviet Naval Aviation
- Service years: 1939–1974
- Rank: Major General
- Unit: 73rd Dive Bomber Aviation Regiment/12th Guards Dive Bomber Aviation Regiment
- Conflicts: World War II; Siege of Leningrad; Baltic Offensive; Battle of Königsberg; East Pomeranian Offensive
- Awards: Hero of the Soviet Union; Order of Lenin; Order of the Red Banner (5); Order of the Patriotic War, 1st class; Order of the Patriotic War, 2nd class; Order of the Red Star; Honoured Military Navigator of the USSR

Yevgeny Ivanovich Kabanov (Russian: Евгений Иванович Кабанов; 20 November 1918 – 19 June 1989) was a Soviet Naval Aviation major general and Hero of the Soviet Union. During World War II, Kabanov served as a bombardier, gunner and navigator in a dive bomber aviation regiment of the Baltic Fleet. He fought in the Siege of Leningrad, the Baltic Offensive, and the Battle of Königsberg. Kabanov was awarded the title for making 103 Petlyakov Pe-2 sorties by June 1944. Postwar, Kabanov became chief navigator of the Black Sea Fleet Air Force, the 8th Fleet Air Force, and the 9th Fighter Aviation Corps. Between 1956 and 1974, Kabanov was chief navigator of Soviet Naval Aviation. He retired in 1974 with the rank of Major general and worked at GosNIIAS. He died in 1989.

== Early life ==
Kabanov was boron on 20 November 1918 in the village of Begichevo in Tambov Governorate. He graduated from seventh grade in 1936 and in 1939 the Voronezh Municipal Civil Engineering Technical School. Kabanov became a technical and foreman in the Ertilsky District Road Department. In December 1939, he was drafted into the Red Army.

== World War II ==
In June 1941, Kabanov graduated from the Naval Aviation School (VMAU) in Nikolayev. Between 1941 and 1942 he was a bombardier and gunner in the VMAU Training Regiment. He fought in combat from November 1942, serving with the 73rd Dive Bomber Aviation Regiment of the Air Force of the Baltic Fleet as a bombardier and gunner with the rank of sergeant. Kabanov fought in the Siege of Leningrad. On 22 May 1943 he was awarded his first Order of the Red Banner. He was promoted to junior lieutenant on 21 June. Kabanov received a second Order of the Red Banner on 14 October. On 3 November he was promoted to lieutenant. In 1944, Kabanov joined the Communist Party of the Soviet Union. In February 1944 the regiment became the 12th Guards Dive Bomber Aviation Regiment. On 30 April Kabanov was awarded a third Order of the Red Banner. On 17 May he received the rank of senior lieutenant. By June 1944 he had become a flight navigator. During the summer of 1944 he fought in the Baltic Offensive. By June 1944 Kabanov had made 103 Pe-2 dive-bombing sorties. During these sorties, he sank a transport and shared credit for two other sinkings, as well as damaging 3 transport and patrol ships. In aerial combat, Kabanov shot down an enemy fighter. For his actions, Kabanov was awarded the title Hero of the Soviet Union and the Order of Lenin.

On 1 November 1944, Kabanov was promoted to captain. He became navigator for a squadron in the regiment. On 22 February 1945 he was awarded the Order of the Patriotic War 2nd class. From late February he fought in the Battle of Königsberg. On 17 May he was awarded a fourth Order of the Red Banner.

== Postwar ==
From the end of the war to 1946, Kabanov was the regimental navigator. On 20 January 1949 he was promoted to major. He was awarded the Medal for Battle Merit on 15 November 1950. In 1951 he graduated from the Air Force Academy. Between 1951 and 1954 Kabanov was navigator of the Black Sea Fleet Air Force 2nd Guards Torpedo Aviation Division. He was promoted to lieutenant colonel on 3 November 1952. In 1954–1955 he was chief navigator of the Black Sea Fleet Air Force. Between November and December 1955 Kabanov was chief navigator of the 8th Fleet (the former Baltic Fleet). Between February and December 1956 he became chief navigator of the Baltic Fleet Air Force 9th Fighter Aviation Corps. From December 1956, Kabanov was the chief navigator of Soviet Naval Aviation. He was awarded the Order of the Red Star on 30 December. He was promoted to colonel on 30 March 1957. On 22 February 1963, he was promoted to major general. Kabanov was awarded a fifth Order of the Red Banner on 22 February 1968. On 17 August 1971, he received the title Honoured Military Navigator of the USSR. He retired in April 1974.

After his retirement, Kabanov lived in Moscow. Between 1976 and 1986 he worked as a specialist in aircraft information display systems at GosNIIAS. On 6 April 1985 Kabanov was awarded the Order of the Patriotic War 1st class on the 40th anniversary of the end of World War II. He died on 19 June 1989 and was buried in the Mitinskoe Cemetery.

== Legacy ==
Streets in Ertil and Begichevo are named for Kabanov. There is a memorial plaque to Kabanov at Ertil School No.1.
