= Honoured Military Navigator of the USSR =

Honorary title Merited Military Navigator of the USSR
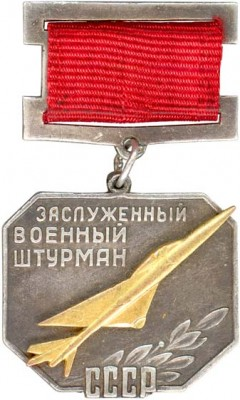
- Obverse of the breast badge "Merited Military Navigator of the USSR"
- Type: Honorary title
- Awarded for: Excellence in military aviation airmanship
- Presented by: USSR
- Eligibility: Citizens of the Soviet Union
- Status: Active
- Established: January 26, 1965
- Related: Merited Military Pilot of the USSR

The Honorary Title "Merited Military Navigator of the USSR" (Russian: Заслуженный военный штурман СССР) was a state military award of the Soviet Union established on January 26, 1965 by Decree of the Presidium of the Supreme Soviet № 3230-VI to recognise and reward excellence in military aviation. It was abolished on August 22, 1988 by Decree of the Presidium of the Supreme Soviet № 9441-XI.

== Award Statute ==
The honorary title "Merited Military Navigator of the USSR" was awarded to members of military flying units, military agencies, military schools, military organizations and other military or federal authorities, having qualified military navigators 1st class or military navigator-instructors 1st class, for outstanding achievements in the development of aviation technology, high performance in education and training of flight personnel and long-term trouble-free flight operations in military aviation.

The Presidium of the Supreme Soviet of the USSR was the main conferring authority of the award based on recommendations from the Ministry of Defence of the USSR.

The breast badge "Merited Military Navigator of the USSR" was worn on the right side of the chest and in the presence of other orders, placed over them. If worn with honorary titles of the Russian Federation, the latter have precedence.

== Award Description ==
The "Merited Military Navigator of the USSR" breast badge was a 27mm wide by 23mm high silver and nickel polygon with raised edges. At the top of the obverse, the relief inscription in three lines covered to the left "MERITED MILITARY NAVIGATOR" (Russian: ЗАСЛУЖЕННЫЙ ВОЕННЫЙ ШТУРМАН), in the center, the gilt tombac image of a jet plane climbing diagonally towards the right its nose and tail slightly protruding over the edges, at the bottom, the relief inscription "USSR" (Russian: СССР) superimposed over a laurel branch.

The badge was secured to a standard Soviet square mount by a silver-plated ring through the suspension loop. The mount was covered by a silk moiré red ribbon.

== Notable recipients (partial list) ==
- Major General Yevgeny Kabanov

== See also ==
- Merited Military Navigator of the Russian Federation
- Merited Military Pilot of the USSR
- Orders, decorations, and medals of the Soviet Union
- Badges and Decorations of the Soviet Union
- Soviet Air Force
