= Mikhail Odintsov =

Soviet aviator and writer

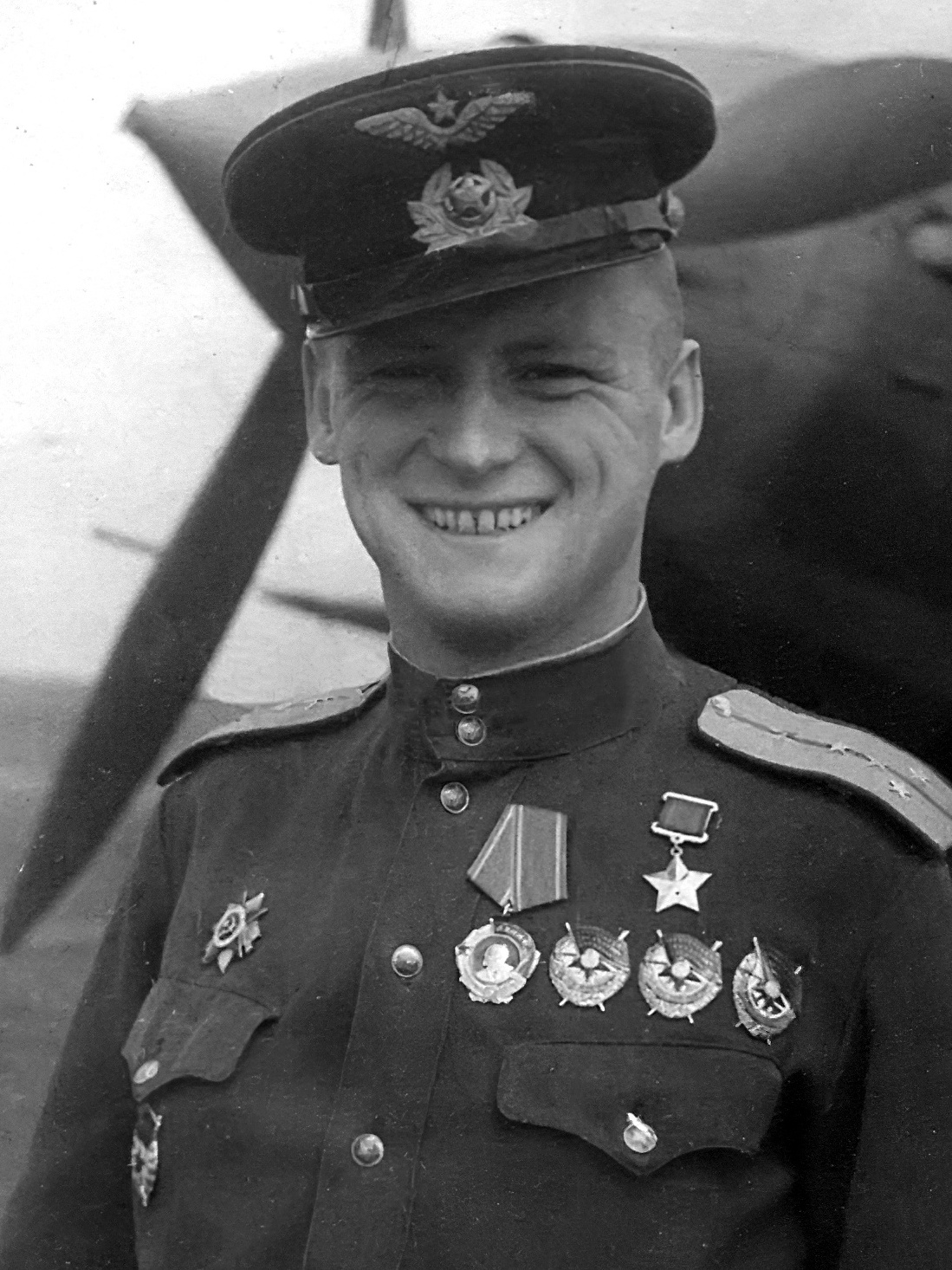
- Born: 18 November 1921; Polozovo, Perm Governorate, RSFSR
- Died: 12 December 2011 (aged 90); Moscow, Russian Federation
- Military career
- Allegiance: Soviet Union
- Branch: Soviet Air Force
- Service years: 1938—1987
- Rank: Colonel-General of aviation (OF-8)
- Awards: Hero of the Soviet Union (twice)

Mikhail Petrovich Odintsov (Russian: Михаи́л Петро́вич Одинцо́в; 18 November 1921 – 12 December 2011) was a Russian journalist and writer, twice Hero of the Soviet Union, Colonel-General of Aviation, honored military pilot of the USSR, and World War II veteran.

== Biography ==
Mikhail Odintsov was born on 18 November 1921 in a Russian family with peasantry roots in the village of Polozovo in Sarapulsky Uyezd in Perm Governorate. His father worked as an investigating officer of the OGPU and the NKVD, and his mother was a laboratory worker. In the town of Sverdlovsk, today Yekaterinburg, he graduated from School No. 36 and studied at the local construction institute. Due to the financial difficulties of his family, he soon gave up studying and found work at the Uralobuv shoe factory in Sverdlovsk between 1937 and 1938. Simultaneously, he became a member of the local flying club and passed the pilot examination with distinction in 1938.

=== Early Military career ===
At the age of 17, in November 1938, he volunteered for the Red Army and became a soldier. After basic training and swearing-in, he applied for the military pilot school in Perm. After the one-year training course he graduated with distinction, became an interim flight instructor and was finally assigned as Kursant to the Engels Air Force Officer School. In May 1940 he passed the examination and was promoted to junior lieutenant. In 1943, he became a member of the Communist Party of the Soviet Union.

=== First assignments and war duty ===
Odintsov's first military pilot assignment was to the 62nd Reconnaissance Aviation Regiment as member of a Tupolev SB crew. Due to Odintsov's excellent performance, he soon became pilot of an Su-2 bomber aircraft of the 226th High-Speed Bomber Aviation Regiment.

From 23 June 1941, Odintsov fought in combat against the Nazi German Wehrmacht. During an air attack his aircraft was shot down. Odintsov and Chervinsky, his flight navigator, survived and were seriously wounded. After a seven-month convalescence, Odintsov was diagnosed by a medical commission as unfit for active service and flying. Nevertheless, Oditsov went to his bomber regiment and started headstrong to fly with handicap. At his own responsibility and with physical limitation he was granted the particular flight license to the bomber aircraft Il-2. On this type of aircraft he flew until the end of the war.

Due to his individual combat experience and his wounds, Odintsov strongly demanded the additional armor plating in order to protect the air-gunner's stand of combat aircraft. The success his air-gunner staff-sergeant Dmitry Nikonov, confirmed his confidence. During numerous air combats, Nikonov shot down eight enemy aircraft without sustaining injuries.

During the war, Odintsov was appointed as pilot-in-command of several different types of tactical aircraft, squadron commander in the 820th Guards Ground Attack Aviation Regiment, and second in command of the 155th Guards Ground Attack Aviation Regiment.

Throughout the war Odintsov showed personally bravery during ground-attack operations, and performed as commanding officer of large flight formations, including serving as the tactical commander of the 292nd Ground Attack Aviation Division and as second in command of the 9th Guards Ground Attack Aviation Division.

Odintsov finished the war with the rank of Major (OF-3) and completed a total of 215 sorties. During those missions, he gained 14 shared shootdowns of enemy aircraft, which was unusual for a bomber pilot in the Soviet Air Force. For this, he was honored with the USSR's highest title Hero of the Soviet Union twice.

=== Postwar activities ===
As the result of Nephritis, not completely cured in the years of war, Odintsov was banned from flying, including suspension of field service, from 1948 to 1950. However, he was assigned as student to the Air Force Military Academy. Afterwards he attended the Lenin Academy for Military Pilots, and graduated in 1952 with distinction. Subsequent to study, he continued to perform as military pilot. Therefore, he personally evaluated a large number of Soviet military airplanes. Types concerned were as follows: Pe-2, Tu-2, Tu-4, IL-28, Su-7, MiG-15, Mig-17, MiG-21, MiG-23, Tu-16, Tu-22, Su-24, Mi-2, Mi-4, Mi-8 and Mi-24. His evaluation reports influenced directly constructive changes, operational improvements, under maintenance of flying characteristics, proved successful.

From 1958 to 1959, he was assigned to the Command and General Staff Officers' Course at the General Staff Academy (Russia), and graduated again with «distinction». Among top assignments, e.g. division commander, and Air Force commanding general of the Moscow military district, he also held other essential appointments as follows:

- Director of the Soviet Cosmonaut Training Centre (1963)
- Supervisor to the Polish Armed Forces (1976–1981)
- Air Force Inspector general in the main inspectorate of MOD USSR (1981–1987)
- Assistant to the Polish representative in the Supreme command of the WP-armed forces (1981–1987)
- Delegate to the XXIV and XXV Convention of the Communist Party of the Soviet Union

=== Retirement ===
During his active service, but also after retirement, Odintsov published frequently articles and books; e.g. «Then in the year 1942 … (Тогда, в 1942-м), «Examination in fire (Испытание огнём)», «Notes of a pilot (Записки лётчика)» and «Conquest (Преодоление)».

After retirement in 1987, he remained in Moscow, where he died December 12, 2011. His tomb is located on the Troyekurovskoye Cemetery

Mikhail Odintsov, colonel general of the aviation retired, was married with his spouse Galina Anisimovna. The Odintsov family had three children, the daughter Marianna and the sons Dmitry and Sergey.

== Orders and decorations ==
Soviet

- Twice Hero of the Soviet Union (4 February 1944 and 27 June 1945)
- Honoured Military Pilot of the USSR (8 July 1967)
- Two Order of Lenin (4 February 1944 and 29 April 1957)
- Order of the October Revolution (16 December 1972)
- Five Order of the Red Banner (31 July 1942, 1 September 1943, 21 January 1944, 22 February 1955, and 16 February 1982)
- Order of Alexander Nevsky (17 August 1944)
- Three Order of the Patriotic War (1st class - 5 November 1942 and 11 March 1985; 2nd class - 22 February 1945)
- Order of the Red Star (22 February 1955)
- Order for Service to the Homeland in the Armed Forces of the USSR, 3rd class (30 April 1975)
- Honorary citizen of Yekaterinburg (1980)
- campaign and jubilee medals

Other states

- Poland - Cross of Valour (19 December 1968)
- Poland - Order of Polonia Restituta 5th class (6 October 1973)
- Romania - Order of Tudor Vladimirescu 5th class (24 October 1969)
- Russia - Order "For Merit to the Fatherland" 4th class (3 December 2001)
- Ukraine - Order of Merit 3rd class (6 May 2005)

== Memorials ==
- Bronze bust in Polosov (Perm Governorate) person of naming to the local secondary school
- Suvorov military school in Yekaterinburg with bronze bust (Colonel general of the aviation, M.P. Odintsov) on the main entrance
- Person of naming of School No. 36 in Yekaterinburg
- Person of naming of a street in Yekaterinburg, «Mikhail Odintsov Square, two-fold Hero of the Soviet Union».
