= Yuri Gagarin Cosmonaut Training Center =

Cosmonaut training facility outside Moscow

Coordinates: 55.8745°N 38.115°E

Gagarin State Scientific Research and Testing Cosmonaut Training Center
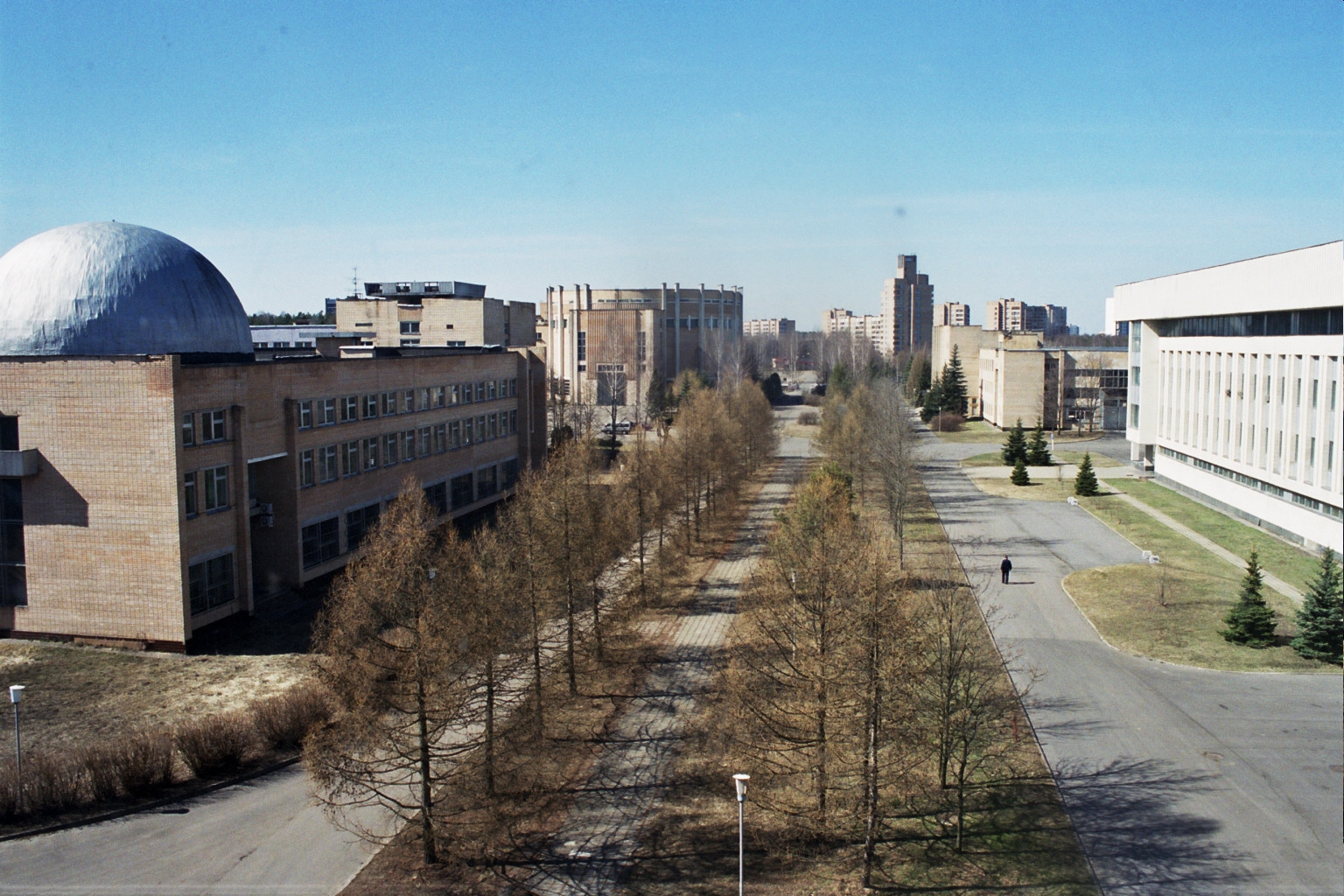
- Native name: Центр подготовки космонавтов имени Ю. А. Гагарина
- Company type: Federal Government establishment
- Industry: Space
- Founded: 1960; 66 years ago
- Founder: Sergei Korolev
- Headquarters: Star City, Russia
- Key people: Oleg Kononenko, Chief (acting)
- Products: Research, testing and training services
- Owner: Russian Federation
- Parent: Roscosmos
- Website: gctc.su

The Yuri A. Gagarin State Scientific Research and Testing Cosmonaut Training Center (GCTC; Russian: Центр подготовки космонавтов имени Ю. А. Гагарина) is a Russian facility that trains cosmonauts for their space missions. It is in Star City of Moscow Oblast, a name which may refer to the facility itself or to its grounds.

== Formation ==
The facility was originally known only as Military Unit 26266 or в/ч 26266, and was a secret training base for Soviet Cosmonaut candidates. The site was chosen for its proximity to Moscow and other infrastructure that would be essential for its function: Chkalovsky Airport, and the Yaroslavl railroad. The densely forested area was originally a radar range with some existing infrastructure.

Military doctor Colonel Yevgeny Karpov was appointed as the first chief of the cosmonaut training centre or Tsentr Podgotovki Kosmonavtov (TsPK) on 24 February 1960. The centre was home to approximately 250 personnel divided into various departments who were responsible for the development of all aspects of the space program ranging from equipment to the well-being of the cosmonauts. These included specialists in heat exchange and hygiene, survival clothing, surgery, and training staff. Initially cosmonaut candidates were housed at the nearby Frunze Central Airfield (Moscow), followed by an apartment block in Chkalovsky before eventually moving to the newly built apartments on site where they would remain with their families throughout training.

== Civilian administration ==
Until April 2009 the center was owned and operated by the Ministry of Defence (Russia) in cooperation with Russian Federal Space Agency. In April 2009, Russia President Dmitry Medvedev signed a presidential decree transferring the center from the Defence Ministry to the Russian Federal Space Agency (Roskosmos).

== Key infrastructure ==
The facility contains infrastructure essential for the training of cosmonauts across a wide range of experiences, including simulating g-loads, mission specific/suit training, medical observation/testing and astronavigation.

Key GCTC facilities include:

- Full-size mockups of all major spacecraft developed since the Soviet era, including the Soyuz and Buran vehicles, the TKS modules and orbital stations of the Salyut Program, Mir, and ISS. These were co-existing or with time replaced one another inside two main training hangar halls of the center. Room 1 houses the Salyut 4, 6, Mir (Don-17KS) with Kvant (Don-37KE), Kvant 2 (Don-77KSD) and Kristall (Don-77KST) modules and a Soyuz 2 descent module simulators. Room 1A houses the Soyuz simulators (Don-7ST3 -old STK-7ST - for the Soyuz TMA; TDK-7ST4 - old TDK-7TS2 for Soyouz TM - for the Soyuz TMM; Don-732M modified for Soyuz TM and the Pilot 732 - for the TORU docking system). Other rooms house the Salyut 7, Spektr (Don-77KSO), Priroda (Don-77KSI), Buran, Zarya and Zvezda simulators.
- Zero-gravity training aircraft for simulating weightlessness (cf. Vomit Comet), including the MiG-15 UTI, Tupolev Tu-104 and later the IL-76 MDK with internal volume of 400 cubic metres (14,000 cu ft). Training aircraft are based at the Russian Air Force base at Chkalovskiy airfield.
- A Medical observation clinic and testing facility.
- The original office of Yuri Gagarin and a number of monuments and busts to him and other cosmonauts.
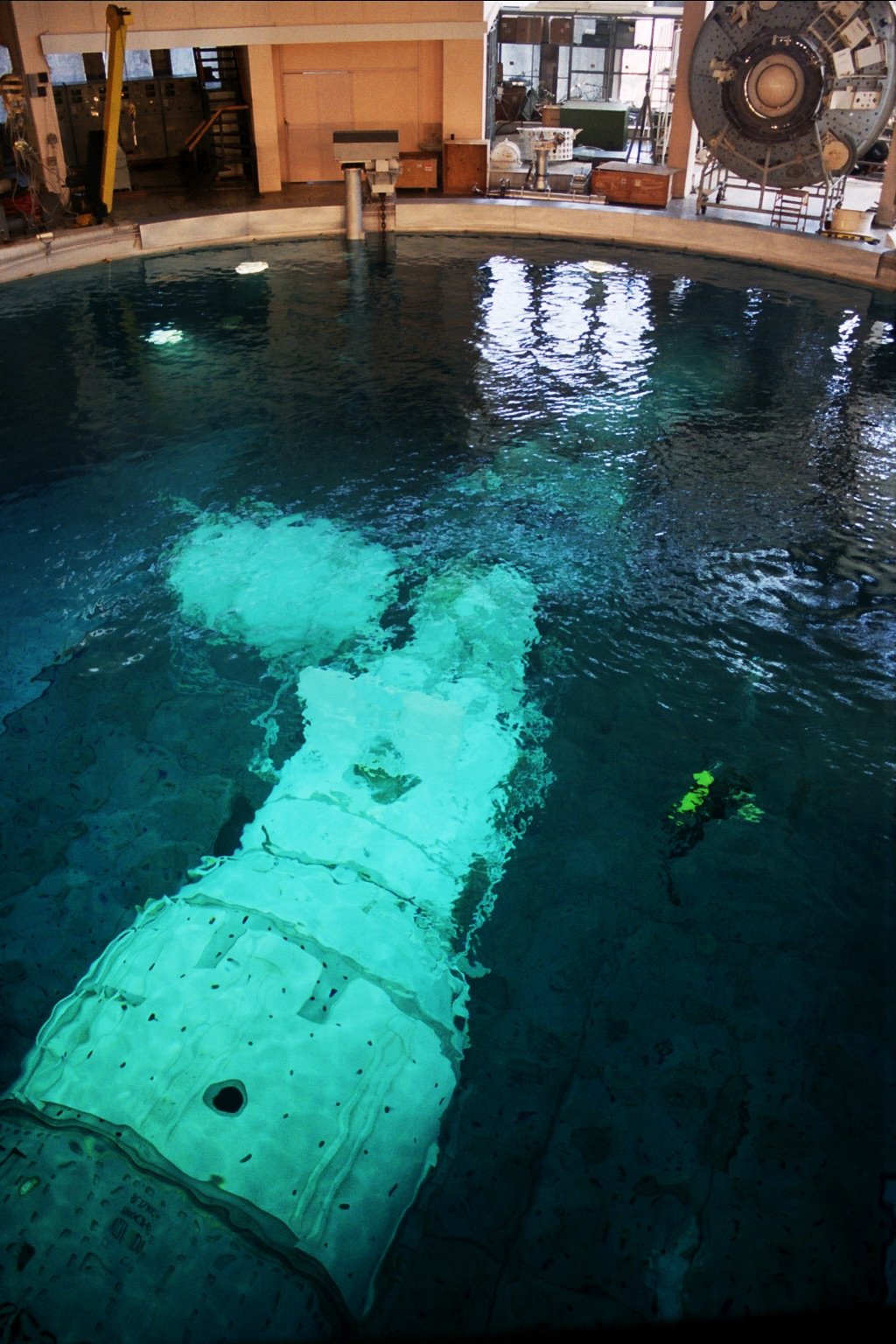
Cosmonauts training with the Zarya training module in the neutral buoyancy pool of the GCTC

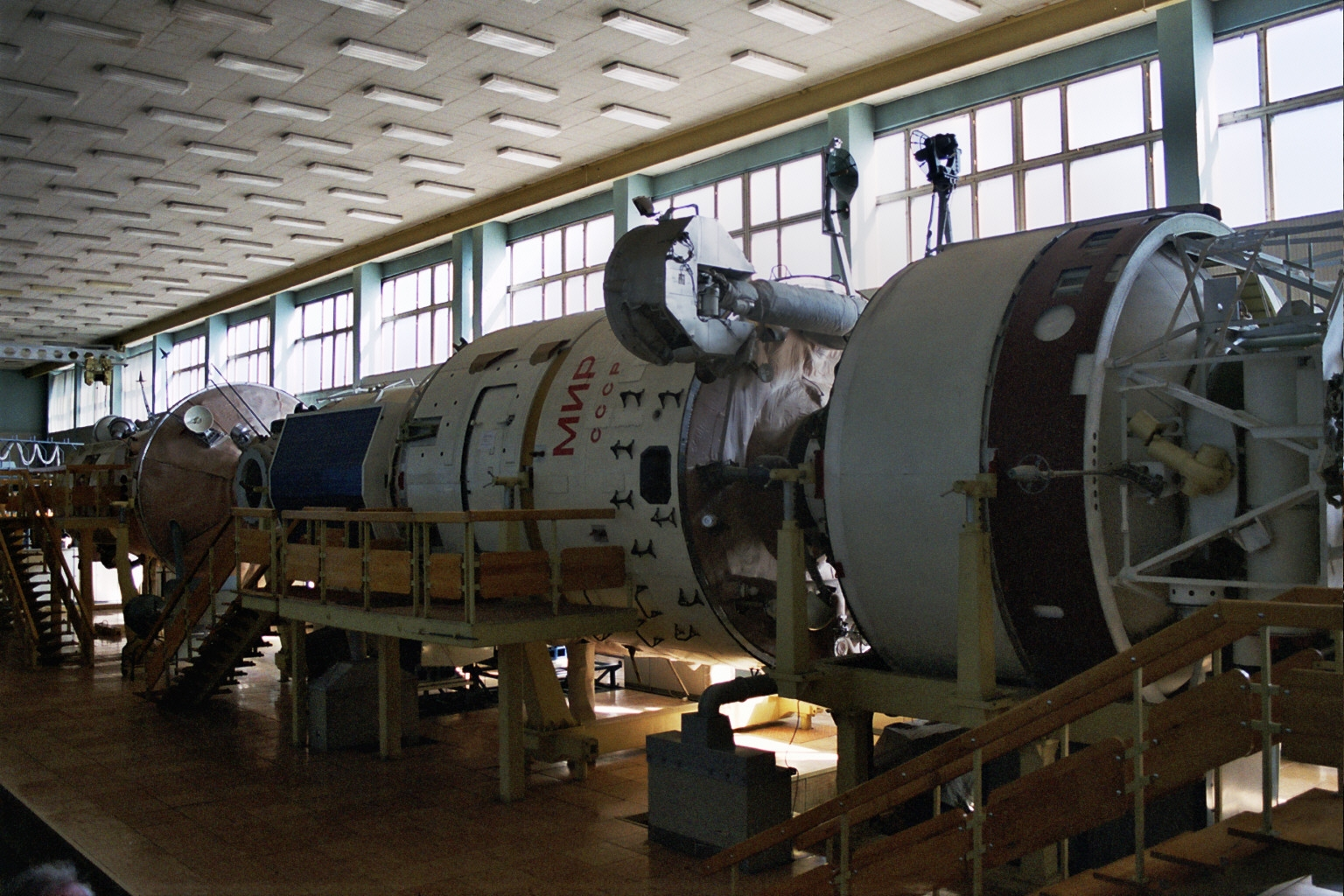
Mir training module

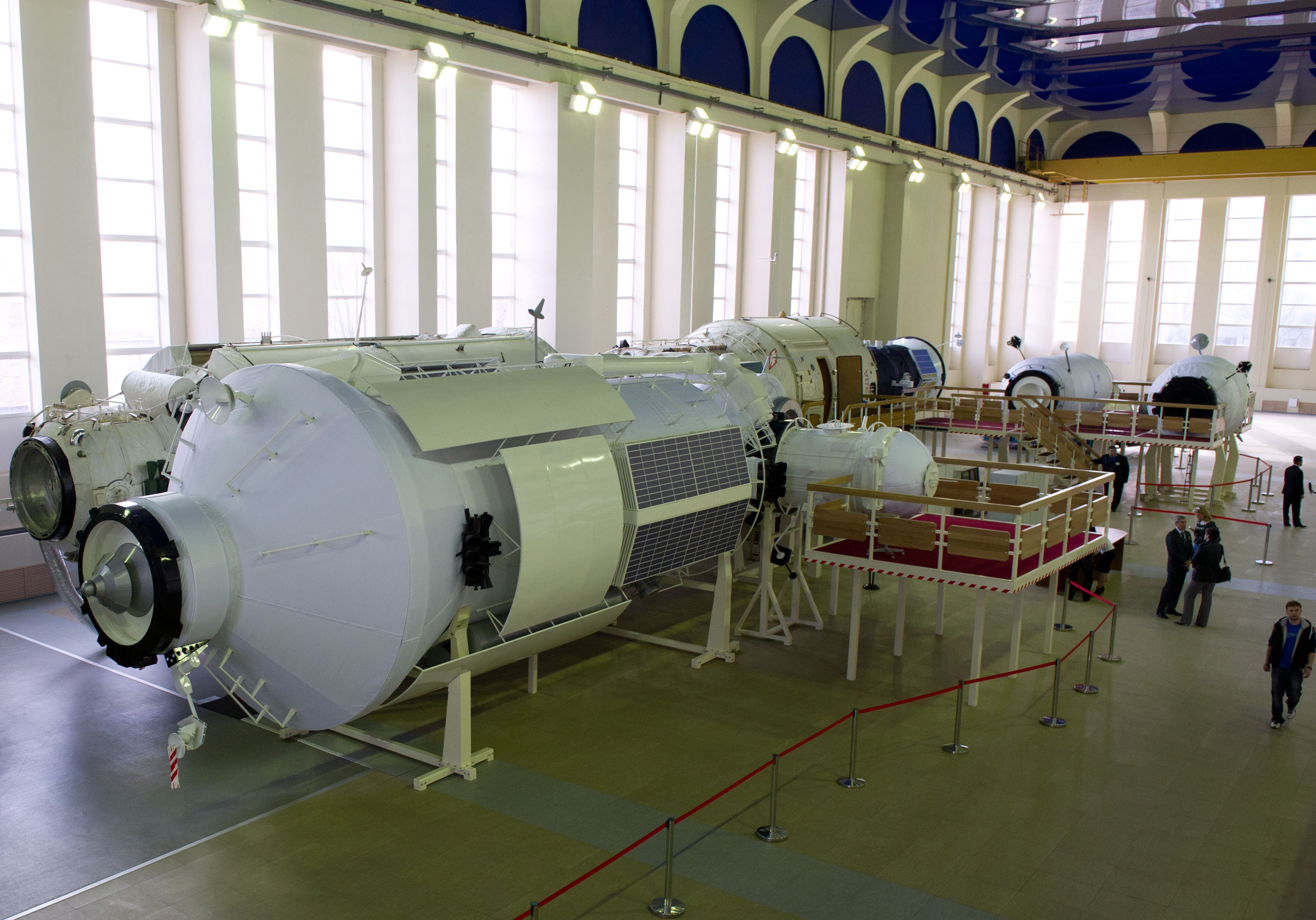
ISS training modules

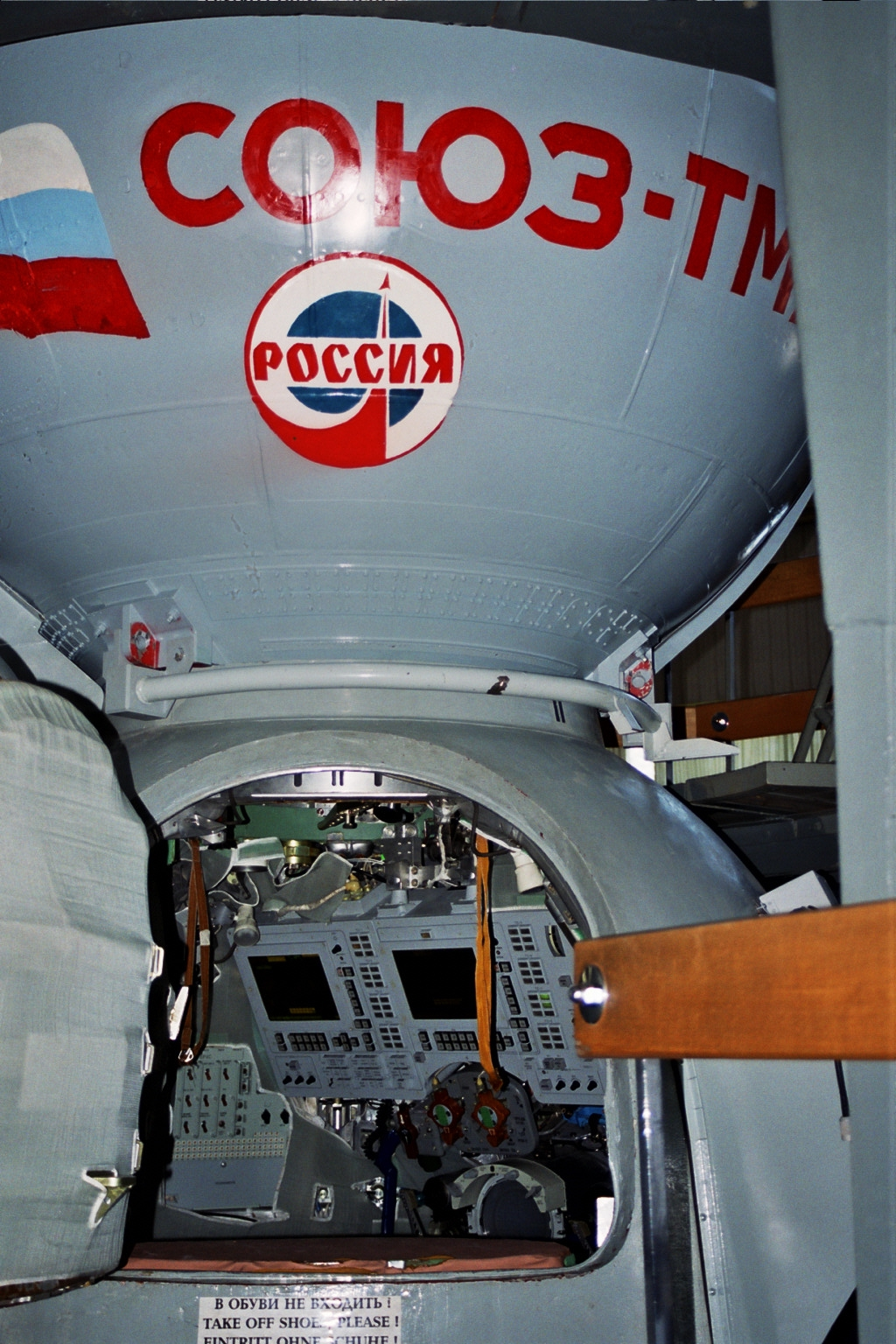
Soyuz TMA training module

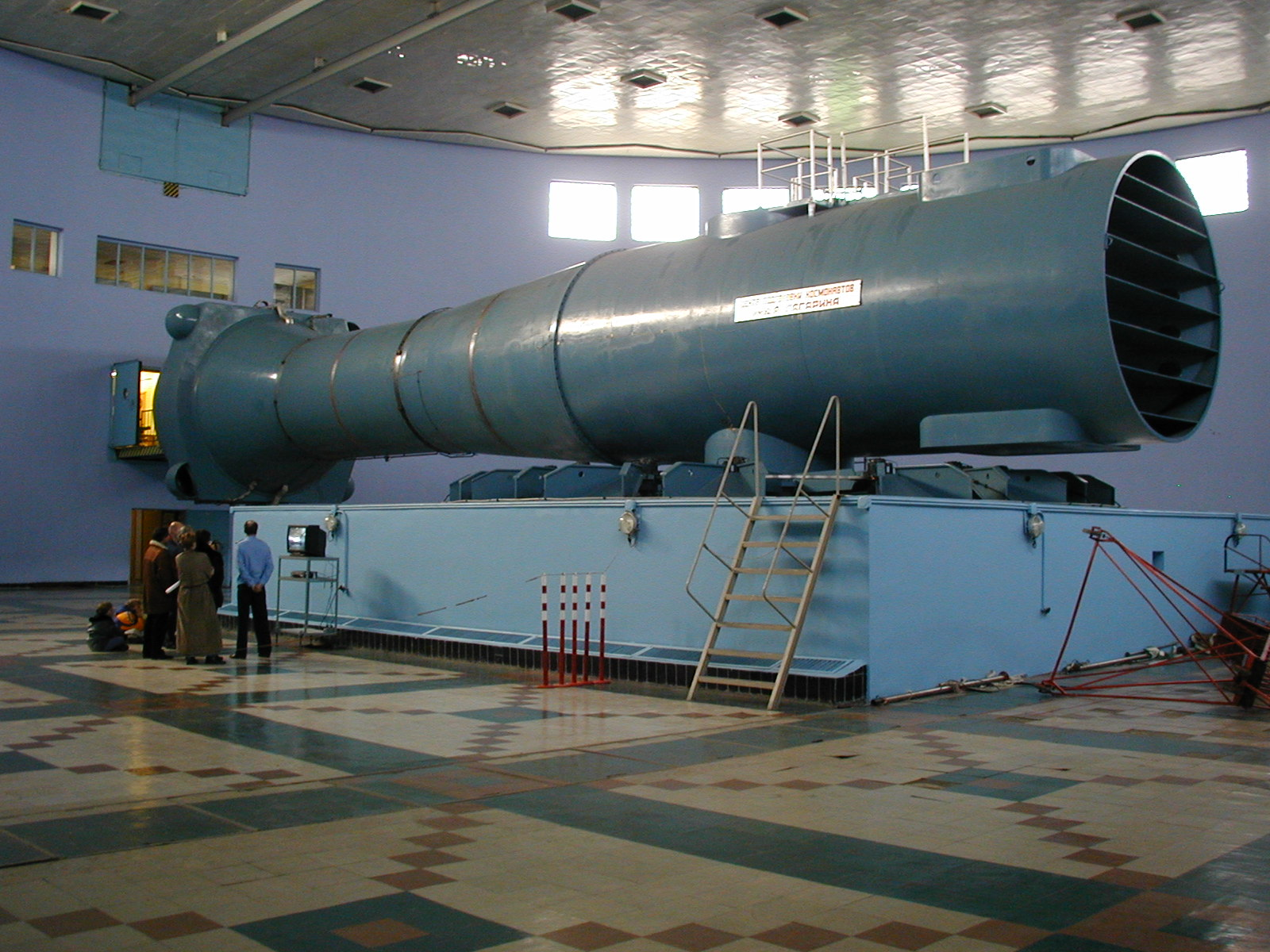
Mother of all centrifuges - Yuri Gagarin Cosmonaut Training Center

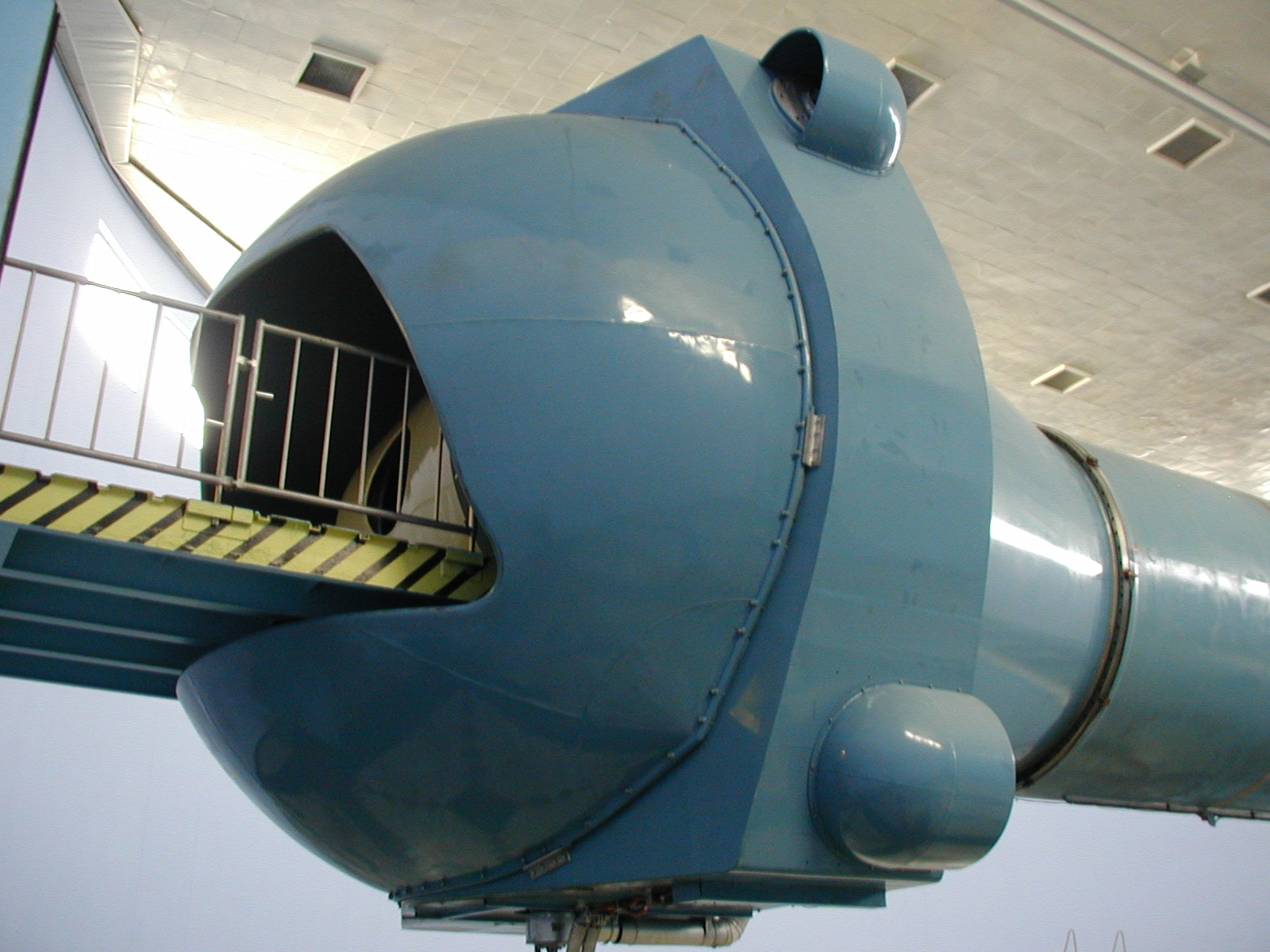
The mouth of the centrifuge at the Yuri Gagarin Cosmonaut Training Center in Star City

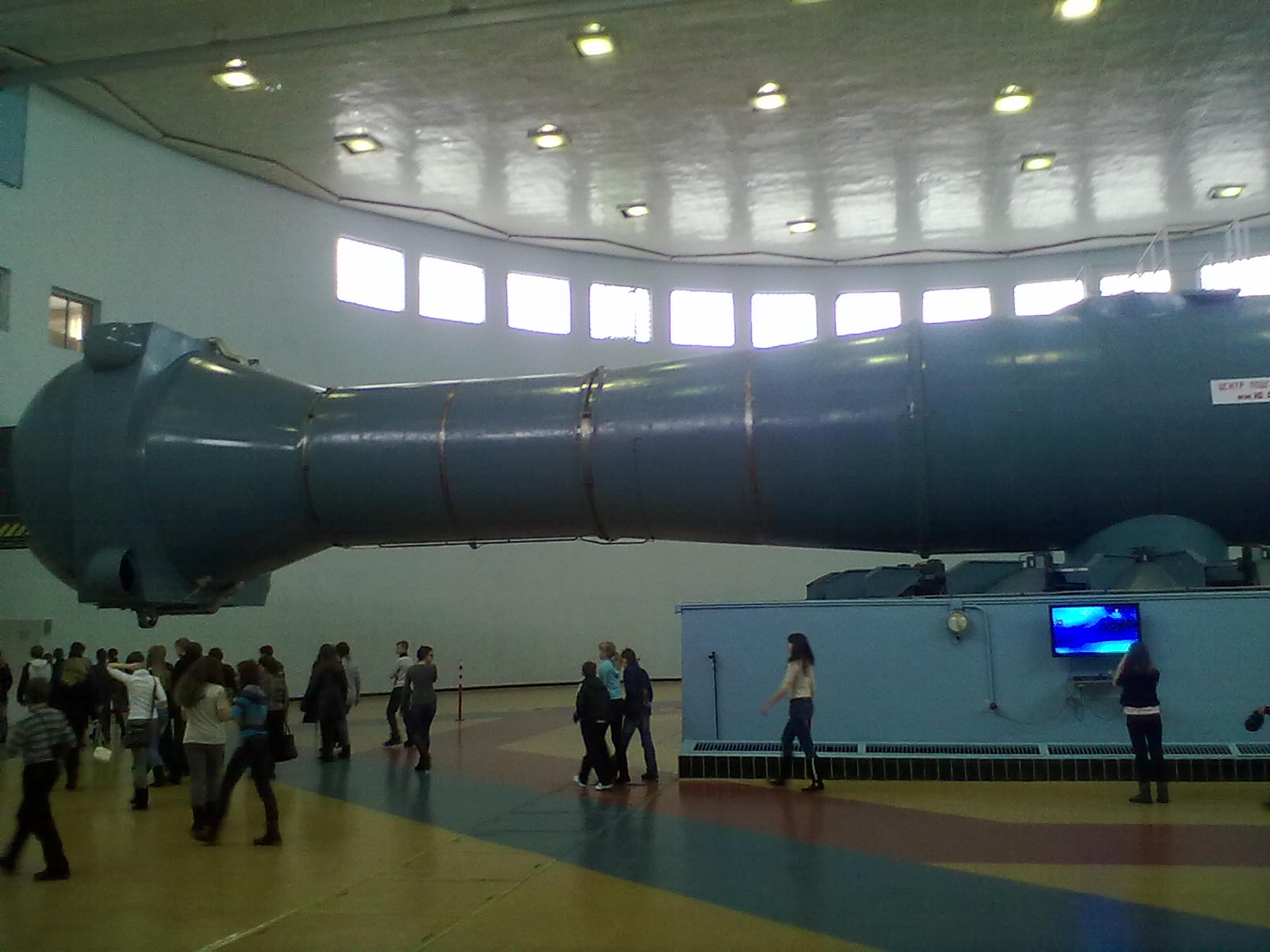
Wide shot of the centrifuge (due excursion) at the Yuri Gagarin Cosmonaut Training Center in Star City

== Heads of the CTC ==
- Yevgeny Karpov (1960–1963)
- Mikhail Odintsov (1963)
- Nikolay Kuznetsov (1963–1972)
- Georgy Beregovoy* (1972–1987)
- Vladimir Shatalov* (1987–1991)
- Pyotr Klimuk* (1991–2003)
- Vasily Tsibliyev* (2003–2009)
- Sergei Krikalev* (2009–2014)
- Yury Lonchakov* (2014–2017)
- Pavel Vlasov (2017–2021)
- Maksim Kharlamov (2021–2025)
- Oleg Kononenko* (since 2025, acting)

Asterisks (*) denote cosmonauts.

== See also ==
- European Astronaut Centre – equivalent astronaut training center in Germany
- Johnson Space Center – equivalent astronaut training center in the United States
