= Georgy Baevsky =

5th Guards fighter aviation regiment

Georgy Arturovich Baevsky
- Native name: Георгий Артурович Баевский
- Born: 11 July 1921; Rostov-on-Don, Russian SFSR
- Died: 6 May 2005 (aged 83) Moscow, Russian Federation
- Allegiance: Soviet Union
- Branch: Soviet Air Force
- Service years: 1940 – 1985
- Rank: Major-General of Aviation
- Conflicts: World War II; Eastern Front
- Awards: Hero of the Soviet Union

Georgy Arturovich Baevsky (Russian: Георгий Артурович Баевский; 11 July 1921 – 6 May 2005) was a flying ace in the 5th Guards Fighter Aviation Regiment of the 11th Guards Fighter Aviation Division during the Second World War who was awarded the title Hero of the Soviet Union on 4 February 1944 and later went on to become a test pilot and major general of the Soviet Air Force.

== Early life ==
Baevsky was born on 11 July 1921 to a Russian family in Rostov-on-Don in the Russian SFSR. His father, Abram Baevsky, was a Soviet intelligence officer who lived under the pseudonym Artur and worked in the cinema industry. Georgy started attending school in Moscow in 1929 but not for long because his family moved to Germany. He became fluent in German during the three years he lived there before the family relocated again, to Sweden. In 1937 the family returned to Russia, settling in Moscow where Georgi began his aviation career at the flight club when he was a teenager before entering flight school.

== Military career ==
Baevsky joined the military in May 1940 after graduating from the Dzerzhinsky Aeroclub flight school in 1939. In November 1940 Baevsky was promoted to the rank of junior lieutenant and assigned as a flight instructor to the Serpukhov flight school. In 1941 he was transferred to the Chkalov Central Aeroclub in Northwest Moscow where he worked until he was sent to the front in April 1943 in the 5th Guards Fighter Aviation Regiment of the 1st Guards Mixed Aviation Corps of the 17th Air Army. His first experience of aerial combat was with a Bf 109 on 27 April 1943. During the war he participated in aerial combat in the Battles for Berlin, Kursk, Dnieper, and Warsaw; by December 1943 he had completed 144 combat sorties and was nominated for the title Hero of the Soviet Union which he received on 4 February 1944. By the end of the war he had completed 252 sorties in 52 different aerial battles, for which he became flying ace for having personally shot down 19 enemy aircraft in total while flying a Lavochkin La-5.

After the war Baevsky attended the Zhukovsky Air Force Engineering Academy and became a test pilot for the air force after graduating, starting his job at the Chkalov Air Force Test Center in 1951 where he worked until entering the Military Academy of the General Staff of the Armed Forces of Russia which he graduated in 1962. In his career as a test pilot he became a skilled pilot of 77 different aircraft types and was heavily involved in the testing of the MiG-25 in Egypt. By the time he retired from the military in 1985 he had risen to the rank of Major-General and had become the Deputy Chief of the Zhukovsky Academy where he had previously been a student.

== Later life ==
After leaving the military Baevskyserved as the chairman of the council of veterans of the 5th Guards Fighter Aviation Regiment. He died in Moscow on 6 May 2005 and was buried in the Troyekurovskoye Cemetery.

== Awards and recognition ==
- Hero of the Soviet Union
- Order of Lenin
- Two Orders of the Red Banner
- Order of Alexander Nevsky
- Order of the Patriotic War 1st Class
- Order of the Patriotic War 2nd Class
- Four Orders of the Red Star
- Medal "For Battle Merit"
- Medal of Zhukov
- campaign and jubilee medals
- Honoured Military Pilot of the USSR
