= Yevgeny Karpov =

Soviet military doctor and space medicine specialist

- Евгений Анатольевич Карпов
- Born: 19 February 1921; Kozatske, Kiev Governorate, Ukrainian SSR
- Died: 25 May 1990 (aged 69); Moscow, Russian SFSR, Soviet Union
- Burial place: Kuntsevo Cemetery
- Military career
- Allegiance: Soviet Union
- Branch: Soviet Air Forces
- Service years: 1938–1978
- Rank: Major general of the medical service
- Commands: Air Force Cosmonaut Training Center
- Conflicts: Eastern Front (World War II)
- Awards: Order of Lenin; Order of the Patriotic War, 1st class Order of the Red Star twice
- Other work: aviation and space medicine research

Yevgeny Anatolyevich Karpov (Russian: Евгений Анатольевич Карпов; 19 February 1921 – 25 May 1990) was a Soviet military doctor, major general of the medical service and specialist in aviation and space medicine. He was involved in the selection of the first Soviet cosmonauts and was the first head of the Air Force Cosmonaut Training Center, which he led from 1960 to 1963.

== Early life and military medical service ==
Karpov was born on 19 February 1921 in the village of Kozatske, then in Kiev Governorate. After completing school in Kyiv, he studied at the S. M. Kirov Military Medical Academy from 1938 to 1943. During the Second World War he served in medical posts in Long-Range Aviation, including as a senior battalion doctor and as head of the medical service of an air division.

In 1947 he was transferred to the medical service of the headquarters of Long-Range Aviation. Later that year he became a senior researcher at the State Research Institute of Aviation and Space Medicine of the Soviet Ministry of Defence. In this position he took part in the initial medical selection of cosmonaut candidates and in preparing instructions for their selection.

== Cosmonaut Training Center ==
At the beginning of 1960 the Soviet Air Forces created a special military unit for the training of cosmonauts, later known as the Air Force Cosmonaut Training Center. Karpov, then a colonel of the medical service, was appointed its first head.

In 1961 Karpov was a member of the commission that examined the first six Soviet cosmonaut trainees, including Yuri Gagarin and Gherman Titov. According to Karpov's later recollections, the training center recommended Gagarin as the prime candidate for the first crewed spaceflight and Titov as his backup. On 12 April 1961, as head of the training center, Karpov accompanied Gagarin at the Baikonur Cosmodrome before the launch of Vostok 1.

Karpov was awarded the Order of Lenin in 1961 for his role in supporting the first human spaceflight. In 1966 he was promoted to major general of the medical service.

== Later career ==
In 1963 Karpov returned to the State Research Institute of Aviation and Space Medicine, where he became deputy head of the institute. He worked on research concerning the professional health of pilots and the classification of functional states of flight crew members.

From 1973 to 1978 he directed the aviation medicine branch of the State Research Institute of Civil Aviation. In that post he helped organize the development of an automated multichannel system for pre-flight medical monitoring of aircrews. He retired from military service in 1978.

Karpov died in Moscow on 25 May 1990 and was buried at Kuntsevo Cemetery.

== Awards ==
Karpov's decorations included:

- Order of Lenin – 17 June 1961
- Order of the Patriotic War, 1st class – 6 April 1985
- Order of the Red Star – twice, 8 June 1945 and 3 November 1953
- Medal "For Battle Merit" – 20 June 1949
- Medal "For the Defence of Leningrad" – 12 December 1942
- Medal "For the Victory over Germany in the Great Patriotic War 1941–1945" – 9 May 1945
