= Andrey Borovykh =

Soviet fighter pilot, colonel-general

Andrey Yegorovich Borovykh
- Андрей Егорович Боровых
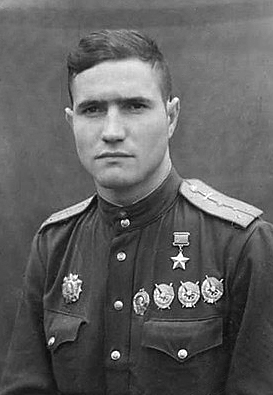
- Born: 30 October 1921; Kursk, Russian SFSR
- Died: 7 November 1989 (aged 68); Moscow, Soviet Union
- Military career
- Allegiance: Soviet Union
- Branch: Soviet Air Force
- Service years: 1940–1989
- Rank: Colonel-General of Aviation
- Awards: Hero of the Soviet Union (twice); Honoured Military Pilot of the USSR

Andrey Yegorovich Borovykh (Russian: Андре́й Его́рович Боровы́х; 30 October 1921 – 7 November 1989) was a Soviet flying ace during World War II who was twice awarded the title Hero of the Soviet Union. After the war he remained in the military until 1989; during his career he achieved the rank of Colonel-General of Aviation and served as commander of the Soviet Air Defence Forces from 1969 to 1977.

== Early life ==
Borovykh was born on 30 October 1921 in Kursk to a working-class Russian family. He finished seven years of schooling in 1936, and in 1937 the graduated from the Kursk aeroclub. He graduated from the Chuguyev Military Aviation School in January 1941, just one year after he entered the military. He worked at the school as a flight instructor until he was evacuated to Chimkent in September. He became a member of the Communist Party in 1943.

== World War II ==
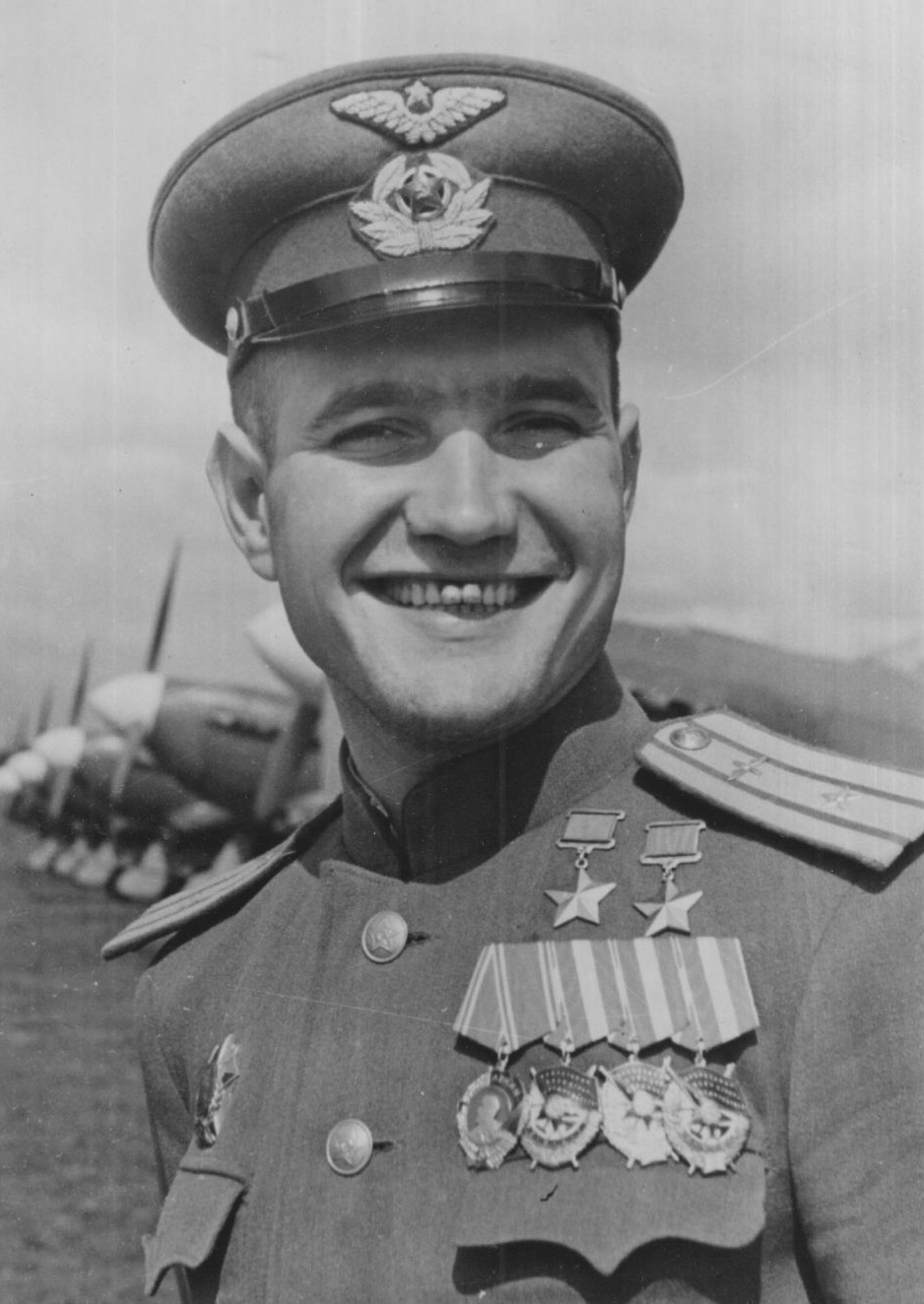
Borovykh, August 1945

Borovykh was deployed to the warfront of the Second World War in December 1941, initially as a pilot and flight commander in the 728th Fighter Aviation Regiment. In September 1942 he transferred to the 157th Fighter Aviation Regiment, where eventually rose through the ranks and was promoted to the position to squadron commander. On 9 May 1943 he was promoted to the rank of junior lieutenant, and after several promotions he reached the rank of Major in January 1945. When he was assigned to the position of squadron commander, the 157th Fighter Aviation Regiment was part of the 273rd Fighter Division of the 6th Fighter Aviation Corps within the 16th Air Army. In the first two years of the war he completed 341 successful sorties and participated in 55 aerial battles, and was credited with shooting down 12 enemy planes. In his next 49 aerial battles he was credited with shooting down 19 enemy planes, a feat that resulted in him being awarded a second Gold Star medal on 23 February 1945.

He saw combat over much of Eastern and Central Europe, including Orel, Kursk, Gomel, Brest, Lviv, Warsaw, and Berlin. His missions involved intercepting enemy aircraft, providing cover for bombers, and conducting aerial reconnaissance. Throughout the war he completed a total of 475 sorties and fought in 113 aerial engagements, flying the I-16, I-185, Hawker Hurricane, Yak-1, Yak-3, Yak-7, and Yak-9 fighters.

=== Final tally ===
Borovykh's final tally is slightly disputed. In recent estimates based on analysis of official documents, Mikhail Bykov credits him with 27 solo and 17 shared victories, while Andrey Simonov and Nikolai Bodrikhin say he had either 32 solo and 14 shared or 29 solo and 16 shared shootdowns. Earlier estimates made by Western authors tend to be higher, although the source for their claims and the accuracy of them is unclear; such estimates often credit him with up to 32 solo and 16 shared victories.

== Later life ==
Borovykh continued to serve in the military after the war, and remained within his wartime regiment until June 1946. He then became the commander of the 233rd Fighter Aviation Regiment while stationed in Germany. In 1949 he was promoted to the rank of lieutenant colonel, and in 1951 he graduated from the Air Force Academy in Monino, after which he became the deputy commander of the 9th Fighter Aviation Division. He continued various high positions in the Soviet Air Forces, and eventually he became the commander of the Soviet Air Defence Forces from 1969 to 1977. He then became an advisor at the Institute of Military History within the Ministry of Defense before he retired from the military in 1988. Not long after he retired he died of unclear causes in November 1989 and was buried in the Novodevichy Cemetery. While he was in the Air Force he also served in politics, first as a deputy in the Supreme Soviet from 1946 to 1950 and then as a deputy in the Supreme Soviet of the RSFSR from 1955 to 1959. He died of a stroke (Note: After his death, Russian tabloids spread a hoax saying he was murdered.) on 7 November 1989 and was buried in the Novodevichy cemetery.

== Awards ==
Soviet

- Twice Hero of the Soviet Union (24 August 1943 and 23 February 1945)
- Honoured Military Pilot of the USSR (16 August 1966)
- Two Order of Lenin (24 August 1943 and 31 October 1967)
- Five Order of the Red Banner (22 June 1942, 6 November 1942, 9 July 1943, 31 July 1945, and 22 February 1955)
- Order of Alexander Nevsky (22 June 1944)
- Order of the Patriotic War 1st class (11 March 1985)
- Three Order of the Red Star (26 October 1955, 29 October 1971, 16 February 1982)
- Order "For Service to the Homeland in the Armed Forces of the USSR" 3rd Class (30 April 1975)
- Honorary citizen of Kursk (1988)

Foreign

- Mongolia – Medal "For Military Merit" (6 July 1971)
- Poland – Virtuti Militari 5th class (6 April 1946)
- Poland – Order of Polonia Restituta 5th class (6 October 1973)
- campaign and jubilee medals
