= Ivan Yefimovich Zhukov =

Soviet Air Force officer (1934–2021)

- Иван Ефимович Жуков
- Born: 31 December 1934; Vladimir, Russian SFSR, Soviet Union
- Died: 10 April 2021 (aged 86); Vladimir, Russian Federation
- Military career
- Allegiance: USSR; Russia
- Branch: Soviet Air Force
- Service years: 1953–1988
- Rank: Polkovnik (Colonel)
- Awards: Hero of the Soviet Union; Order of Lenin; Order of the Red Star; Medal "Veteran of the Armed Forces of the USSR"; Medal "For Impeccable Service" First, Second and Third Classes; Honoured Military Pilot of the USSR

Ivan Yefimovich Zhukov (Russian: Иван Ефимович Жуков; 31 December 1934 – 10 April 2021) was an officer of the Soviet Air Force. Over his time in service, he reached the rank of polkovnik, the Soviet equivalent to colonel. In 1982 he was awarded the title of Hero of the Soviet Union.

Born in 1932, Zhukov began a long association with flying while studying in his hometown. After being drafted into the armed forces in 1953, he studied and trained in several of the country's military flight schools. Rising through the ranks, he served in fighter regiments, and as an instructor pilot, later becoming involved in training and development of new technologies. In 1982, while flying the MiG-25PU, an accident occurred, causing the aircraft to become almost uncontrollable. Zhukov was able to save and land the aircraft, and a subsequent investigation uncovered the cause of the accident. The MiG-25 design was altered to prevent further accidents, and Zhukov was awarded the title of Hero of the Soviet Union for his role in saving the aircraft, and the contribution to technological developments. After a period as senior inspector-pilot, Zhukov retired in 1988, and died in 2021. His life and achievements are commemorated in his birth city of Vladimir.

== Early life and career ==
Zhukov was born on 31 December 1932 in Vladimir, then part of the Russian Soviet Socialist Federative Republic, in the Soviet Union. He studied in the school in his hometown, taking ten classes, and was a member of the Vladimir Aeroclub. In November 1953 he was drafted into the Soviet Armed Forces. Zhukov graduated from further studies at the Orenburg Higher Military Aviation School in January 1955, and from the Syzran Higher Military Aviation School in 1957. He went on to serve as a pilot, and then senior pilot, in fighter regiments in the Belorussian Military District until August 1963. Zhukov then studied at the Air Force Academy, graduating in 1967, and in June that year was then assigned as a senior instructor-pilot of the 764th Fighter Aviation Regiment, stationed at Bolshoye Savino airfield in Perm. He was part of the Soviet Air Defence Forces as deputy commander, and later, commander, of a squadron, and chief of air combat and tactical training.

In March 1976 Zhukov became senior inspector-pilot for the Air Defence Force's experimental aviation intercept systems, and in August 1978, until June 1985, senior inspector-pilot for the Air Defence Force's 1st Combat Training Department. During this time he was heavily involved in the development and testing of the MiG-25 and MiG-31 interceptor aircraft. He was awarded the Order of the Red Star on 22 February 1977, and promoted to polkovnik in 1980.

== 1981 accident ==
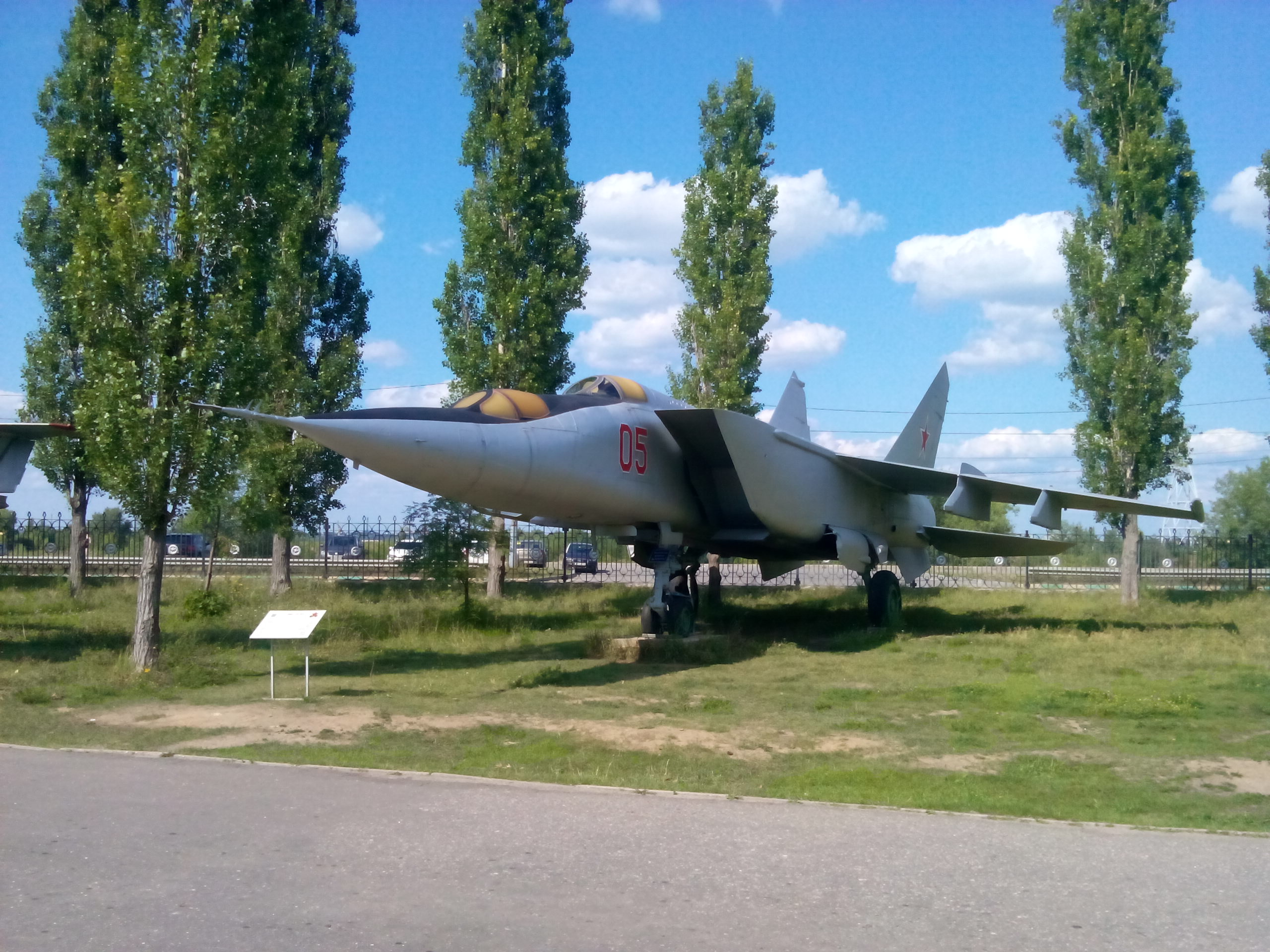
A MiG-25PU, a two-seater trainer aircraft of the type Zhukov was flying during the 1981 accident

In August 1981, Zhukov was at Krichev airfield, in Mogilev Region, taking part in a demonstration flight of the MiG-25PU. With Zhukov in the aircraft was the second pilot, Captain Obolentsev. During the flight an engine fire broke out, jamming the aircraft's control booster. The aircraft, then at an altitude of 17,000 feet, became practically uncontrollable, with the crew barely able to operate the rudders. Rather than ejecting, Zhukov decided to attempt to save the aircraft, so that the cause of the accident could be traced. Descending to the airfield, Zhukov made a practice pass above the runway at safe ejection height, and decided to risk a landing. He then successfully and safely landed the aircraft, at a speed of over 100 kmph faster than normal. Subsequent investigation discovered a defect on the aircraft, which was then eliminated on other MiG-25s.

On 16 February 1982 a decree of the Presidium of the Supreme Soviet of the USSR awarded Zhukov the title of Hero of the Soviet Union, number 11466, with the concurrent award of the Order of Lenin, number 458505, and the Gold Star for "courage and heroism shown in the development of new weapons and military equipment and the rescue of an aircraft in an emergency". On 16 August that year he was also awarded the title of Honoured Military Pilot of the USSR.

== Later life ==
In June 1985 Zhukov became Chairman of the Qualification Commission, and senior inspector-pilot of the Air Defence Force. He retired from active service in October 1988. In retirement he settled in the village of Zarya, Balashikha, Moscow Oblast. In his hometown of Vladimir he was honoured with the naming of Secondary School No. 2, where he had studied, after him. A museum to Zhukov's life is located in the school. In 2015 the Russian Military History Society placed a memorial plaque to Zhukov on the school, in a ceremony attended by Ivan Zhukov. A portrait of Zhukov is painted on the school's facade.

Ivan Zhukov died in Vladimir on 10 April 2021 at the age of 86.
