= Pavel Plotnikov =

Soviet general and Hero of the Soviet Union

Pavel Artemyevich Plotnikov
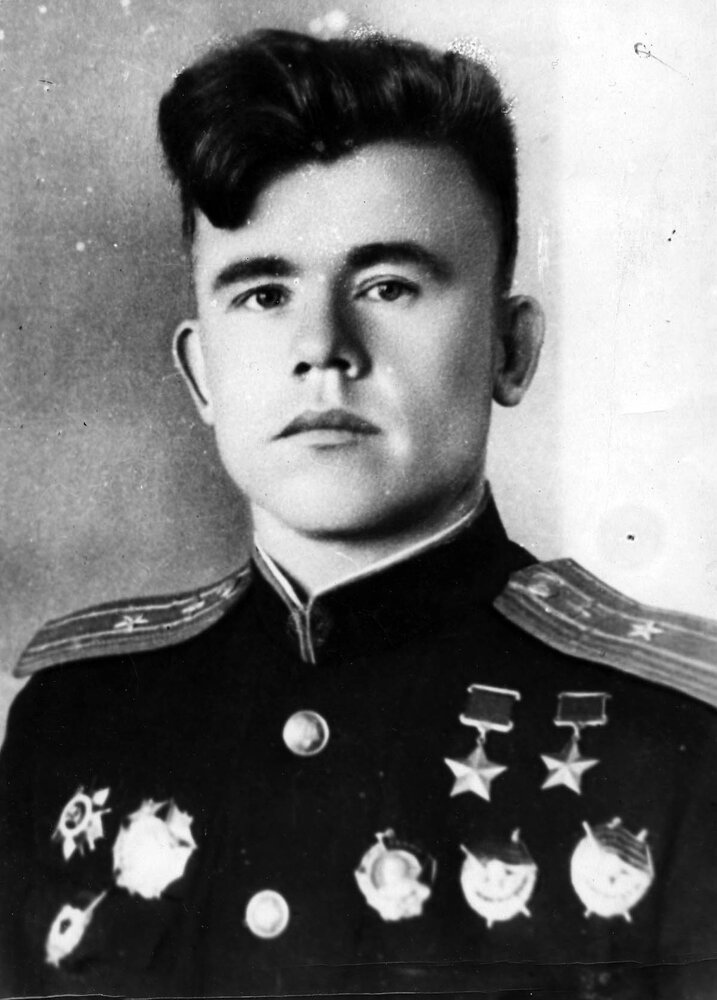
- Born: 4 March 1920; Gonba, Altai Governorate (located in present-day Barnaul)
- Died: 14 December 2000 (aged 80); Moscow, Russia
- Military career
- Allegiance: Soviet Union
- Branch: Soviet Air Force
- Service years: 1938 – 1975
- Rank: Major-General of Aviation
- Unit: 81st Guards Bomber Aviation Regiment
- Conflicts: World War II
- Awards: Hero of the Soviet Union (twice)

Pavel Artemyevich Plotnikov (Russian: Па́вел Арте́мьевич Пло́тников; 4 March 1920 – 14 December 2000) was a prolific Soviet bomber pilot and double Hero of the Soviet Union. After the second World War II, Plotnikov continued his Air Force career and rose to the rank of Major General and retired in 1975.

== Early life ==
Plotnikov was born on 4 March 1920 to a Russian peasant family in Gonba village of the Altai Governorate. Having moved to the city of Barnaul in 1930, he graduated from his seventh grade of school in 1935 before going on to attend trade school and the local aeroclub. After finishing trade school in 1937 he was employed fixing cars until entering the military in 1938. Upon graduating from the Novosibirsk Military Aviation School of Pilots in August 1940 he was assigned to the 165th Reserve Aviation Regiment, but just a few months later he was reassigned to the 230th High-Speed Bomber Aviation Regiment.

== World War II ==
Soon after entering combat as part of the defense of the Soviet Union in September he was transferred to the 277th Bomber Aviation Regiment. He was transferred again in January 1942 to the 459th Night Bomber Aviation Regiment, where he remained for then entire year. During his tenure in the night bomber regiment he faced multiple close calls but despite so went on to fly successfully. On 10 April 1942 sank a transport, and later that month he attacked a heavily defended metallurgical plant in Mariupol in poor weather. During that mission, he was forced to turn the plane sharply to avoid enemy defenses, resulting in his navigator parachuting out of the plane after mistakenly believing that the plane was in a tailspin. Despite being without his navigator, he managed to return to his airfield. Barely two months later he took out eight enemy bombers on the ground.

In April 1943 he became a flight commander in the 82nd Guards Bomber Aviation Regiment, which used Pe-2 dive-bombers; he was later promoted to deputy squadron commander. During the battle for the Dnieper he scored a direct hit to an enemy bridge on 21 September 1941, disabling enemy movement in the area for a long time. Later on 20 October 1943 he flew the squadron commanded by general Ivan Polbin; the flight consisted of 17 bombers with 14 fighter escorts. The mission targeted the Aleksandriya railways station in Kirovohrad, and due to the bad weather they were forced to fly below the clouds. After hitting their targets Polbin noticed incoming enemy dive bombers, and decided to attack them and their airfield as well. The 31 Soviet planes took on 46 German planes, destroying 13 of them, of which six were shot down by Pe-2s. For his role in the mission, which included shooting down a Junkers Ju 87, Plotnikov was awarded the Order of the Patriotic War 1st class. Later in Spring 1944 he took out two enemy crossings during one sortie, having made repeated passes at the target in addition to bombing railway areas of military importance. On 14 April 1944 he made a flight that reached the maximum range of the Pe-2 to reach far-away enemy territory; the mission lasted almost three hours. In May he was nominated for the title Hero of the Soviet Union for having flown 225 sorties, and received the title in August. The next month he transferred to 81st Guards Bomber Aviation Regiment as a squadron commander. There he flew reconnaissance missions and went “free-hunting” for targets in addition to standard missions, often flying with captain Sergey Yashin. After surviving the attack in Breslau on 11 February 1945 that resulted in the death of general Ivan Polbin, he continued to increase his sortie tally, and 6 March 1945 he led a group of nine bombers in attacking the Lamsdorf airfield, taking out a fuel depot and 16 enemy aircraft. Later that month he was nominated to receive a second gold star for totaling 305 sorties, and by the end of the war he reached 344 sorties – 104 on the Tupolev SB, 203 on the Pe-2, and 31 on the Ar-2 and A-20 Boston, during which he shot down three enemy aircraft.

== Postwar ==
Plotnikov left his wartime regiment shortly after the end of the war in June 1945. After graduating from the Lipetsk Higher Officer Flight and Tactical School he returned to the 81st regiment. Later he graduated from the Monino Air Force Academy in 1951. From then until 1955 he was a flight inspector in a training directorate, after which he served as the deputy commander of the 47th Bomber Division for one year. In 1956 he was made deputy flight training commander of the 52nd Bomber Aviation Division, and in 1957 he was promoted to flight training commander. In 1960 he graduated from the Military Academy of General Staff, and from then until 1962 he held a flight control post. He then returned to working in flight training, heading a combat training department before becoming deputy commander of a task force in the arctic. In 1963 he was made deputy chief of staff for the 26th Air Army, based in Belarus, and the next year he became the deputy flight training commander of the 10th Separate Special-Purpose Aviation Brigade. Promoted to the rank major-general in 1966, he flew a variety of aircraft throughout the Warsaw Pact countries as well as to Vietnam and Tanzania. Before retiring in 1975 he served as the deputy chief of staff of the 36th and 37th Air Armies. While a civilian he worked at the Scientific Research Experimental Institute of Automotive Electrical Equipment and Automotive Devices as an engineer and later at the Ministry of the Gas Industry. He died in Moscow on 14 December 2000 and was buried in the Ivanovskoe cemetery.

== Awards and honors ==
- Twice Hero of the Soviet Union (19 August 1944 and 27 June 1945)
- Honored Military Pilot of the USSR (16 August 1966)
- Order of Lenin (19 August 1944)
- Three Order of the Red Banner (14 October 1942, 6 September 1943, and 22 February 1955)
- Order of Alexander Nevsky (1 April 1945)
- Two Order of the Patriotic War 1st class (13 November 1943 and 11 March 1985)
- Order of Red Star (30 December 1956)
- campaign and jubilee medals

== Bibliography ==
- Simonov, Andrey; Bodrikhin, Nikolai (2017). Боевые лётчики — дважды и трижды Герои Советского Союза [Combat pilots — twice and thrice Heroes of the Soviet Union] (in Russian). Moscow: Russian Knights Foundation and Vadim Zadorozhny Museum of Technology. ISBN 9785990960510. OCLC 1005741956.
