= Polozovo =

Polozovo Полозово
- Selo
- Location within Perm Krai Location within Russia
- Coordinates: 57°21′N 54°25′E
- Country: Russia
- Region: Perm Krai
- District: Bolshesosnovsky District
- Time zone: UTC+5:00

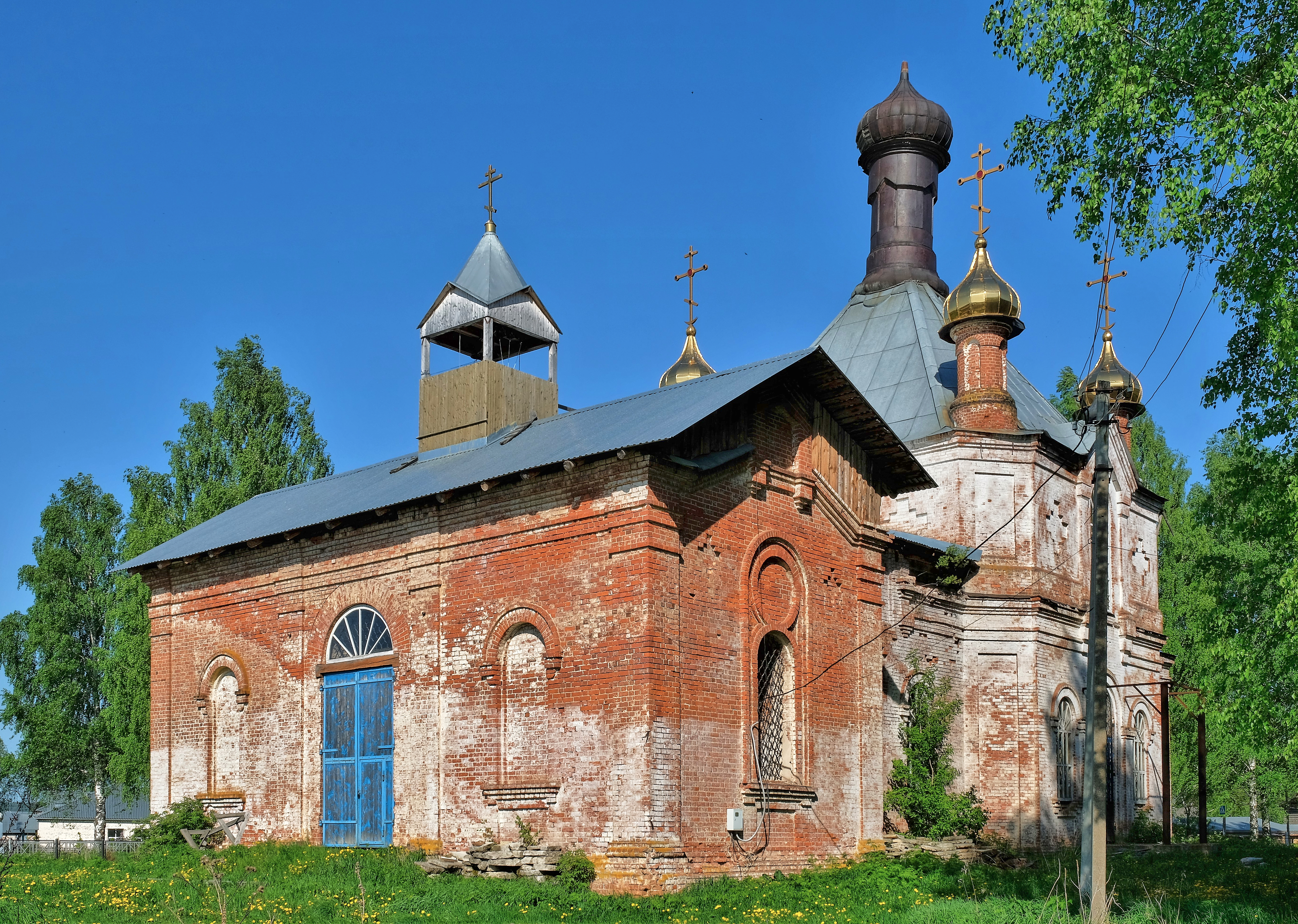
Church of the Holy Equal-to-the-Apostles Grand Duke Vladimir in the village of Polozovo, Bolshesosnovsky District, Perm Territory

Polozovo (Russian: Полозово) is a rural locality (a selo) and the administrative center of Polozovoskoye Rural Settlement, Bolshesosnovsky District, Perm Krai, Russia. The population was 269 as of 2010. There are 7 streets.

== Geography ==
Polozovo is located 40 km south of Bolshaya Sosnova (the district's administrative centre) by road. Krasny Yar is the nearest rural locality.
