= Begichevo =

Begichevo Бегичево
- Village
- Location within Voronezh Oblast Location within Russia
- Coordinates: 51°42′N 40°56′E
- Country: Russia
- Region: Voronezh Oblast
- District: Ertilsky District
- Time zone: UTC+3:00

Begichevo (Russian: Бегичево) is a rural locality (a village) in Buravtsovskoye Rural Settlement, Ertilsky District, Voronezh Oblast, Russia. The population was 128 as of 2010. There are 2 streets.

== Geography ==
Begichevo is located 26 km southeast of Ertil (the district's administrative centre) by road. Buravtsovka is the nearest rural locality.
