= Honoured Military Pilot of the USSR =

Soviet title of honour

Honorary title Honoured Military Pilot of the USSR
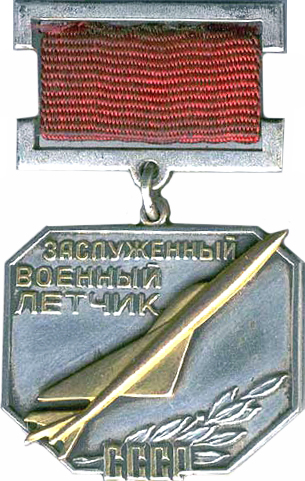
- Obverse of the chest badge "Honoured Military Pilot of the USSR"
- Type: Honorary title
- Awarded for: Excellence in military aviation airmanship
- Presented by: USSR
- Eligibility: Citizens of the Soviet Union
- Status: No longer awarded
- Established: January 26, 1965
- Related: Honoured Military Navigator of the USSR

The Honorary Title "Honoured Military Pilot of the USSR" (Russian: Заслуженный военный лётчик СССР) was a state military award of the Soviet Union established on January 26, 1965, by Decree of the Presidium of the Supreme Soviet No. 3230-VI to recognise and reward excellence in military aviation. It was abolished on August 22, 1988, by decree of the Presidium of the Supreme Soviet No. 9441-XI.

== Award statute ==
The honorary title "Honoured Military Pilot of the USSR" was awarded to members of military flying units, military agencies, military schools, military organizations and other military or federal authorities, having qualified military pilots 1st class or military pilot-instructors 1st class, for outstanding achievements in the development of aviation technology, high performance in education and training of flight personnel and long-term trouble-free flight operations in military aviation.

The Presidium of the Supreme Soviet of the USSR was the main conferring authority of the award based on recommendations from the Ministry of Defence of the USSR.

The chest badge "Honoured Military Pilot of the USSR" was worn on the right side of the chest and in the presence of other orders, placed over them. If worn with honorary titles of the Russian Federation, the latter have precedence.

== Award description ==
The "Honoured Military Pilot of the USSR" chest badge was a 27-millimetre-wide by 23-millimetre-high silver-and-nickel polygon with raised edges. At the top of the obverse, the relief inscription in three lines covered to the left "Honoured MILITARY PILOT" (Russian: ЗАСЛУЖЕННЫЙ ВОЕННЫЙ ЛËТЧИК), in the center, the gilt tombac image of a jet plane climbing diagonally towards the right its nose and tail slightly protruding over the edges, at the bottom, the relief inscription "USSR" (Russian: СССР) superimposed over a laurel branch.

The badge was secured to a standard Soviet square mount by a silver-plated ring through the suspension loop. The mount was covered by a silk moiré red ribbon.

== Notable Recipients (partial list) ==
- Georgy Baevsky
- Leonid Beda
- Andrey Borovykh
- Alexander Yefimov
- Pavel Kutakhov
- Vladimir Mikhaylov
- Mikhail Odintsov
- Pavel Plotnikov
- Vitaly Popkov
- Vasily Reshetnikov
- Yevgeny Savitsky
- Sultan Sosnaliyev
- Nikolai Sutyagin
- Ivan Zhukov

== See also ==
- Orders, decorations, and medals of the Soviet Union
- Honoured Military Pilot of the Russian Federation
- Badges and Decorations of the Soviet Union
- Soviet Air Force
- Meritorious Military Pilot of the German Democratic Republic
