= Airmanship =

Skill and knowledge applied to aerial navigation

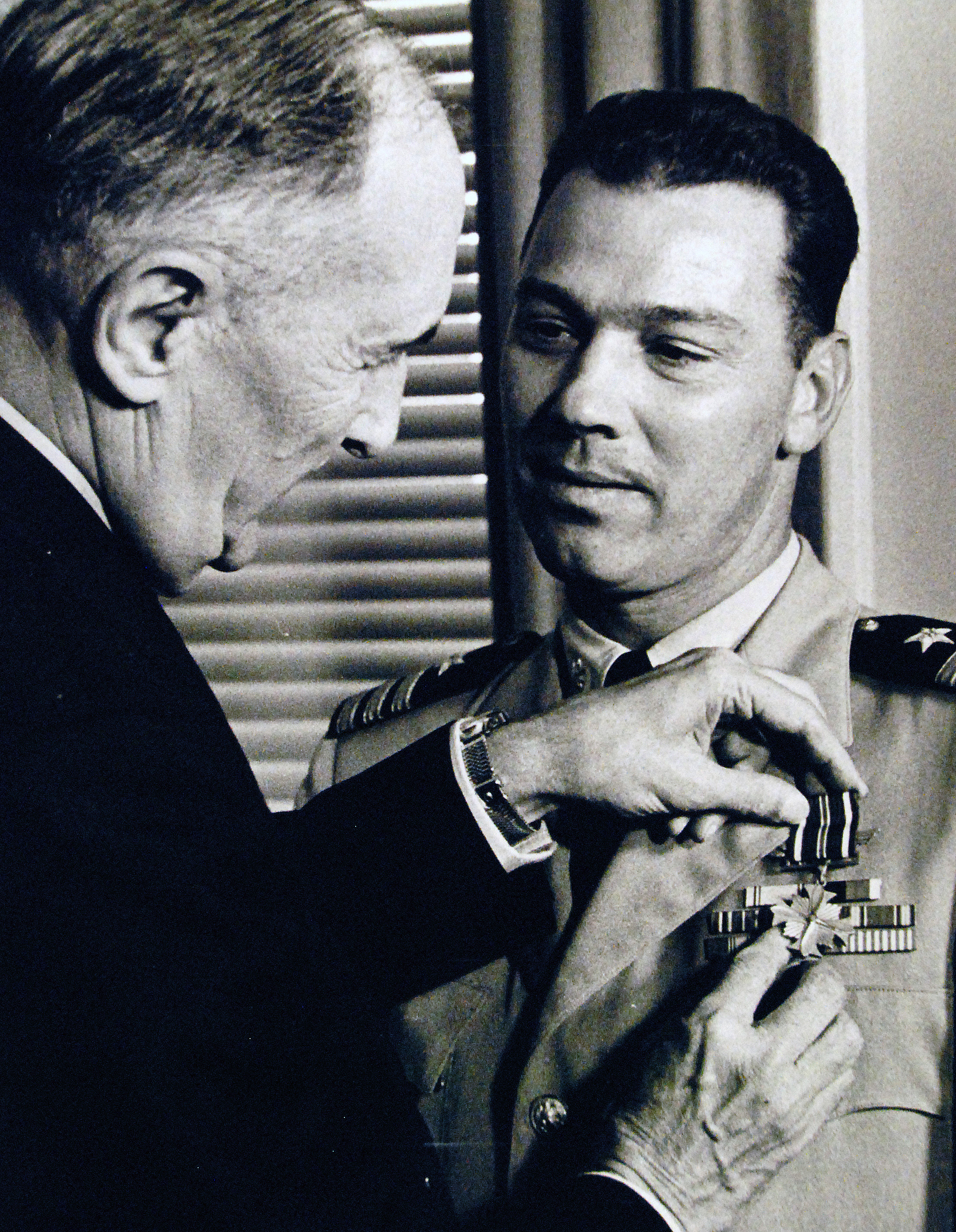
John F. Davis receives the Distinguished Flying Cross “For... establishing a new world record... for class “c” jet aircraft on a 100 kilometer closed course. In the preparation for and execution of this flight, he exercised brilliant airmanship."

Airmanship is skill and knowledge applied to aerial navigation, similar to seamanship in maritime navigation. Airmanship covers a broad range of desirable behaviors and abilities in an aviator. It is not simply a measure of skill or technique, but also a measure of a pilot's awareness of the aircraft, the environment in which it operates, and of their own capabilities.

== Definition ==
Airmanship is a quality comprehensive of all aspects of flight, ranging from control, navigation, awareness, and decision-making. Airmanship may be derived from applied discipline and extensive training.

Airmanship is defined by the Federal Aviation Administration (FAA) as a "broad term that includes a sound knowledge of and experience with the principles of flight; the knowledge, experience, and ability to operate an aircraft with competence and precision both on the ground and in the air; and the application of sound judgment that results in optimal operational safety and efficiency."

The United Kingdom Civil Aviation Authority (CAA) describes airmanship as "a somewhat controversial and vague expression intended to convey a measure of understanding; experience; or, more succinctly, aviation 'common-sense'. What can be said is that 'Airmanship' is something gained from exposure to the experiences and sage advice of other aviators; properly thinking about and understanding the application of rules, procedures and airspace; and a healthy dose of self-preservation."

== Principles ==
A core principle of airmanship taught to student pilots is "Aviate, Navigate, Communicate", to remind them of priorities during an emergency. The highest priority is to keep the aircraft flying, avoiding loss of control or controlled flight into terrain. Next, the pilot(s) should verify their location and navigate toward a suitable destination. Communication with air traffic control or other planes is the third highest priority.

== History ==
The actions of Captain Alfred C. Haynes and the crew of United Airlines Flight 232 while dealing with their crippled McDonnell Douglas DC-10 are cited as quality airmanship. They were able to bring their craft to a survivable "controlled crash" in Sioux City, Iowa, after a complete loss of all flight controls following an engine failure in July 1989. They did this by improvising a control scheme on the spot using differential engine thrust on the two working engines. Captain Haynes credited his Crew Resource Management training as one of the key factors that saved his and his passengers' lives.

=== Lack of airmanship in accidents ===
==== General or commercial aviation ====
The U.S. National Transportation Safety Board (NTSB) occasionally cites poor airmanship as a contributing factor in its determination of probable cause in aviation accidents, although it is implicit in many of the pilot error causes it often uses. For example, in its report on the December 1, 1993, fatal crash of Northwest Airlink Flight 5719, the NTSB determined the "failure of the company management to adequately address the previously identified deficiencies in airmanship" was a contributing factor.

In a 2005 business jet accident at Teterboro Airport, NTSB investigator Steve Demko said determining an aircraft's weight and balance before takeoff is "basic airmanship," a "Flying 101 type of thing." Similarly, in the 2006 New York City plane crash that killed New York Yankees pitcher Cory Lidle, the NTSB cited "inadequate judgment, planning and airmanship" in its probable cause determination.

==== Military aviation ====
For fighter pilots operating combat aircraft, failures in airmanship can be disastrous. For example, in the Tarnak Farm incident in Afghanistan, the pilot of a U.S. F-16 Fighting Falcon mistakenly targeted a 500 pounds (230 kg) laser-guided bomb on training Canadian troops in April 2003, killing four of them. A "failure of airmanship" was cited by Maurice Baril.
