= Gagarin Air Force Academy =

Russian military aviation academy

Coordinates: 55°50′34″N 38°10′53″E

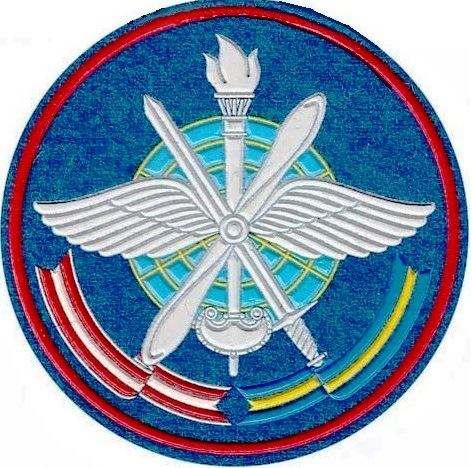
- Type: Military Academy for Aviation
- Active: 1940–2011
- Students: future high-ranking military personnel for the Russian Aerospace Forces.
- Location: Monino (Монино), Moscow Region., Russia

Gagarin Air Force Academy (Russian: Военно-воздушная академия имени Ю. А. Гагарина, romanized: Voyenno-vozdushnaya akademiya imeni Yu. A. Gagarina) was a Russian military aviation academy located in Monino, Moscow Oblast.

The academy prepares high-ranking military personnel for the Russian Air Force.

Among the academy alumni are around 700 Heroes of the Soviet Union (highest award in the USSR), more than 10 cosmonauts, and over 2000 military specialists from 21 foreign countries.

The school provided regiment and division-level commanding officers to fill commanding, staff, navigation, logistics, communications and radar-support positions.

Alternative academy names in the English-language literature include Yuri Gagarin Military Air Academy and Yuri Gagarin Air Force Academy. In conversational speech often simply referred to as Gagarin Academy or Monino Academy. By late 2008, this academy and the N. Zhukovsky Aviation Engineering Academy both merged to become the Gagarin-Zhukovsky Military Combined Air Force Academy, but it retained its Monino campus. Later in 2011, the Monino campus was closed.

== History ==
The academy was founded in 1940. It was named Air Force Academy in 1946. In 1968 it was named after Yuri Gagarin. In Soviet times, only the officers with a primary military education (летное училище – flight school) and holding the position of major could study at the academy. The collection of the serial and experimental Soviet aircraft (air force museum) served as a base for the studying by cadets of the academy. According to tradition, after the end of active military service as teachers of the academy, the officers became the guides in the museum. In 2008, Gagarin Air Force Academy was amalgamated with the Zhukovsky Air Force Engineering Academy. The new academy was titled "Zhukovsky – Gagarin Air Force Academy" – a federal government military educational institution of higher education run by the Russian Ministry of Defence.

== Superintendent ==
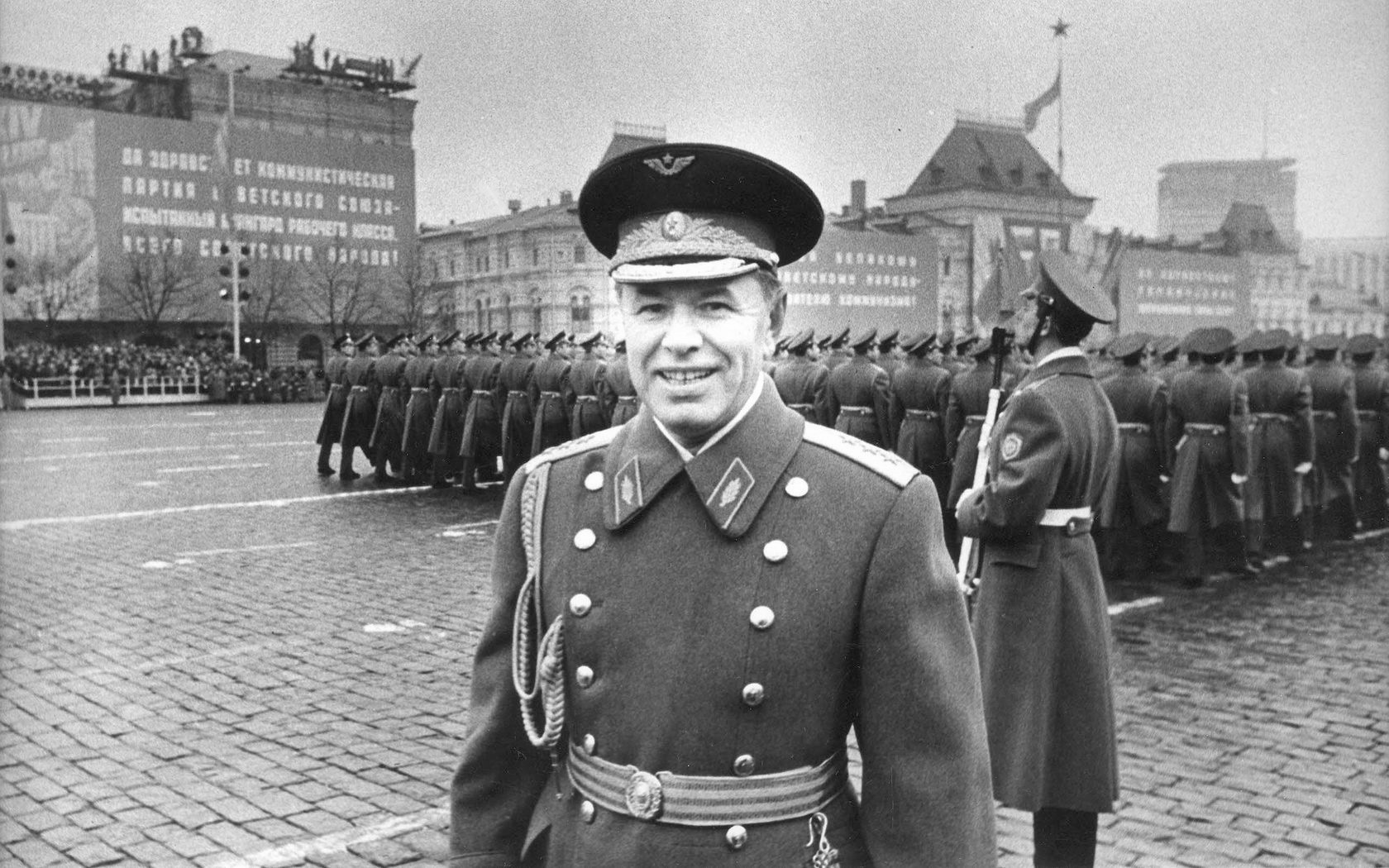
General Nikolai Skomorokhov at the 1974 October Revolution Parade.

- 1940 – Zinovy Pomerantsev
- 1940-1941 – Fyodor Arzhenukhin
- 1942 – Fyodor Astakhov
- 1941–1942 – Leonid Naryshkin
- 1942–1944 – Yakov Shkurin
- 1944–1946 – Petr Ionov
- 1946–1950 – Fedor Falaleyev
- 1950–1956 – Serafim Pestov
- 1956–1968 – Stepan Krasovsky
- 1968–1973 – Sergei Rudenko
- 1973–1988 – Nikolai Skomorokhov

== Notable faculty ==
- Alexei Zaitsev – professor, Major-General retired.
- Ivan Timokhovich – Doctor of Historical Sciences, professor, Major-General of aviation.

== Notable alumni ==
- Vladimir Aleksenko – Twice Hero of the Soviet Union, Lieutenant-General.
- Vasily Andrianov – Twice Hero of the Soviet Union, Major-General.
- Leonid Beda – Twice Hero of the Soviet Union, Honored Military Pilot of the USSR (1971), Lieutenant-General of aviation (1972).
- Georgy Beregovoy – Pilot-Cosmonaut of the USSR, twice Hero of the Soviet Union.
- Mikhail Bondarenko – Twice Hero of the Soviet Union
- Viktor Bondarev – Commander in Chief, Russian Federation Air Force (2011), Colonel-General. Hero of the Russian Federation.
- Andrei Borovykh – Hero of the Soviet Union awarded twice, Colonel-General of aviation, Commander of the Aviation of the Air Defense Forces of the USSR (1969–1977).
- Rafael del Pino – Deputy Chief of the Cuban Air and Air Defense Force
- Pavel Galkin – Hero of the Soviet Union
- Aleksei Gubarev – Pilot-Cosmonaut of the USSR, twice Hero of the Soviet Union Major-General.
- Sigmund Jähn – East German cosmonaut
- Mikhail Karpeyev – Hero of the Soviet Union
- Ivan Kozhedub – World War II ace-pilot, shoot down highest number of enemy aircraft (64) among pilots of Soviet forces. Thrice Hero of the Soviet Union; Marshal of Aviation (1985).
- Anatoly Nedbaylo – Twice Hero of the Soviet Union, Deputy Superintendent of the Kiev Higher Air Force Engineering Academy (1968–1983), Major-General of aviation.
- Ivan Vorobyov – Twice Hero of the Soviet Union
- Alexander Yefimov – Commander in Chief Air Force and Deputy Minister of Defense of the USSR (1984–1990); Marshal of Aviation (1975), Honored Military Pilot of the USSR (1970), Doctor of Military Sciences, professor.
- Alexander Zelin – Commander in Chief, Russian Federation Air Force (2007), Colonel-General.

== See also ==
- Air force academy
- Central Air Force Museum
