= Rafael Pino =

Rafael Pino may refer to:

- Rafael del Pino (Cuban) (b. 1938), Cuban aviator and dissident
- Rafael del Pino (Spaniard) (b. 1920), Spanish businessman and billionaire
