= Mikhail Bondarenko =

Mikhail Bondarenko may refer to:

- Mikhail Grigoryevich Bondarenko (1912–1943), Hero of the Soviet Union
- Mikhail Ivanovich Bondarenko (1901–1943), Hero of the Soviet Union
- Mikhail Zakharovich Bondarenko (1913–1947), twice Hero of the Soviet Union
- Mykhailo Bondarenko (1905–1938), Soviet government and party functionary
