= Mikhail Karpeyev =

Soviet military officer (1922–2021)

- Михаил Поликарпович Карпеев
- Born: 21 November 1922; Yakimovo, Cheboksarsky Uyezd, Chuvash Autonomous Oblast, Russian SFSR
- Died: 7 June 2021 (aged 98); Kharkiv, Ukraine
- Burial place: Rohan, Kharkiv Oblast
- Military career
- Allegiance: USSR
- Branch: Soviet Air Forces
- Service years: 1940–1978
- Rank: Colonel; Major General (honorary)
- Conflicts: Second World War
- Awards: Soviet Union: Hero of the Soviet Union; Order of Lenin; Order of the Red Banner (2x); Order of Alexander Nevsky; Order of the Patriotic War, First Class (2x); Order of the Red Star; Order "For Service to the Homeland in the Armed Forces of the USSR", Third Class; Ukraine: Order of Bohdan Khmelnytsky, Third Class; Defender of the Motherland Medal

Mikhail Polikarpovich Karpeyev (Russian: Михаил Поликарпович Карпеев; 21 November 1922 – 7 June 2021) was an officer of the Soviet military who held a number of posts in the Soviet Air Forces, reaching the rank of colonel, and being awarded the title of Hero of the Soviet Union.

Born into a peasant family in 1922, Karpeyev graduated from school shortly before the Axis invasion of the Soviet Union. He had attended the local aeroclub in his youth and was in the Red Army, enrolled in the Sverdlovsk Military Aviation School for Pilots, on the outbreak of war. Quickly transferred to the frontlines as a pilot, he went on to serve in many of the most active theatres of the war for the Soviets. He was seriously injured during the siege of Leningrad, spending six months in hospital, before returning to active service. Flying the Polikarpov Po-2, and later the Ilyushin Il-2, Karpeyev rose to the rank of guards lieutenant while engaging in numerous dangerous sorties. He carried out bombing runs, attacks on military targets, aerial reconnaissance missions, and supply runs to partisans behind enemy lines. By the end of the war Karpeyev had made 310 combat sorties, destroying large quantities of enemy equipment and infrastructure. In recognition of his courage and achievements, in June 1945 he received the title of Hero of the Soviet Union.

Karpeyev remained in the Soviet military after the war, carrying out further training, and graduating from the Air Force Academy in 1952. He then worked to train future pilots at the Kachinsk Military Aviation School, and then the Kharkov Higher Military Aviation School of Pilots. Retiring from the military with the rank of colonel in 1978, he settled in Kharkiv and worked as a senior engineer at the Kharkiv Tractor Plant until 1993, and continued to be active in patriotic activities, and with schools and universities. In 2005, he was appointed an honorary major general of aviation by the President of Ukraine. Karpeyev died in Kharkiv in 2021 at the age of 98. He had received numerous honours and awards over his career, and at the time of his death he was the last Hero of the Soviet Union living in Kharkiv Oblast.

== Early life and career ==
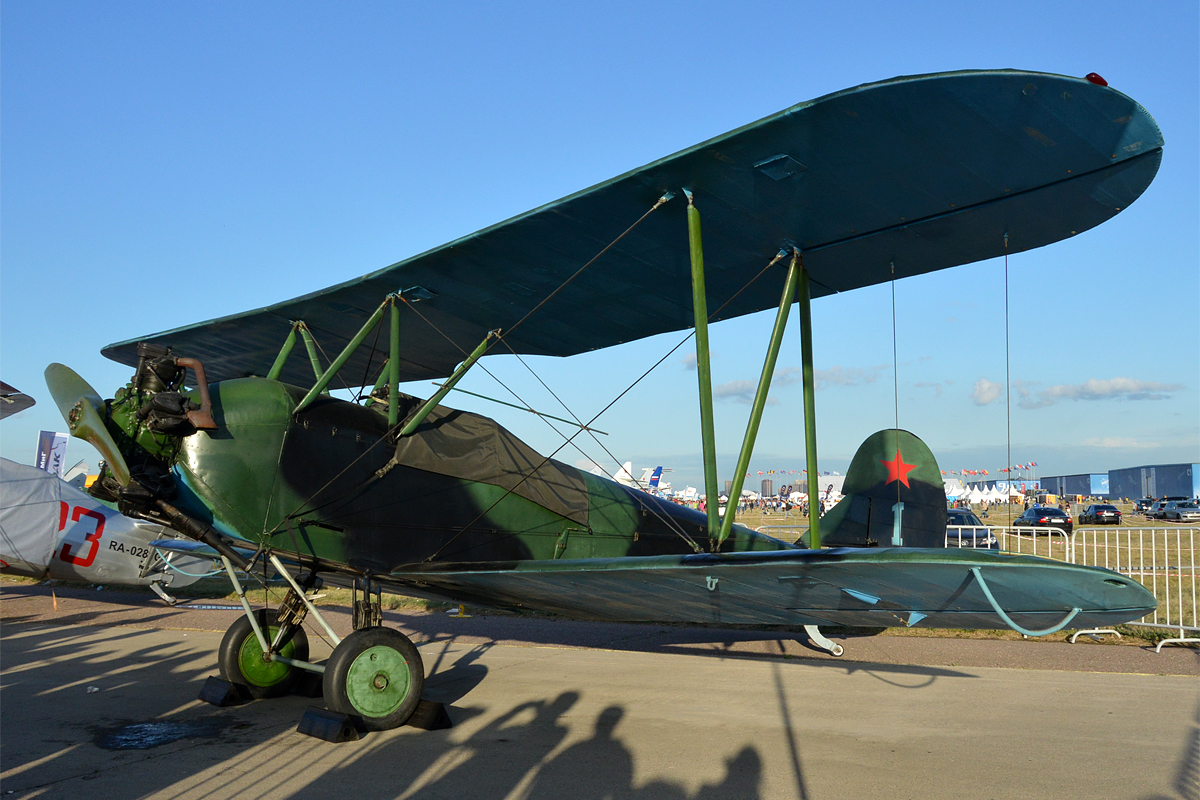
A Polikarpov Po-2. Karpeyev saw action flying these aircraft during the early part of the war.

Karpeyev was born on 21 November 1922, to a Russian peasant family in the village of Yakimovo (now part of the city of Cheboksary), in Cheboksarsky Uyezd, Chuvash Autonomous Oblast, in the Russian Soviet Federal Socialist Republic. He studied at school number 4 in Cheboksary, and also attended the city's aeroclub, graduating in 1940. In October 1940, he joined the Red Army and enrolled in the Sverdlovsk Military Aviation School for Pilots, graduating in August 1941 with the rank of sergeant. This was shortly after the Axis invasion of the Soviet Union in June that year, and Karpeyev was sent to the 22nd Aviation School in Alma-Ata, in the Kazakh Soviet Socialist Republic, as a pilot-instructor. The school was then reformed as a frontline fighting force as the 662nd Night Bomber Aviation Regiment, equipped with the Polikarpov Po-2. This began Karpeyev's wartime career, during which he saw action on the Leningrad, Stalingrad, Southern, 4th Ukrainian and 3rd Belorussian Fronts. He began as a pilot, rising through the ranks and positions to senior pilot, flight commander, and then deputy squadron commander of the 75th Guards Assault Aviation Regiment, of the 1st Guards Assault Aviation Division.

== Wartime service ==
Karpeyev first began flying sorties around Leningrad and during the siege of the city. In February 1942, he was seriously wounded during a combat mission, spending six months in hospital. Returning to service after his recovery, he went on to fly 87 night combat missions on the Leningrad Front in Polikarpov Po-2s against enemy targets, as well as a further 15 missions to contact partisans behind enemy lines. On 23 June 1944, while flying a combat mission against enemy artillery and mortar positions in the region of Orsha, Karpeyev and his group came under heavy fire from anti-aircraft defences. Guards Lieutenant Karpeyev made three approaches to the target, and suppressed the fire of two of the anti-aircraft defence positions. Three days later, on 26 June 1944, Karpeyev attacked the railway station at Tolochin, bombing enemy targets and firing on enemy trains with his machine guns. By the start of 1945, Karpeyev was credited with destroying or damaging an enemy tank and up to 10 vehicles, as well as suppressing eight anti-aircraft positions, destroying seven residential buildings, starting two fires, and killing thirty enemy combatants.

By 1945, Karpeyev was a deputy squadron commander, and flew as a lead pair. On 5 January 1945, he carried out an aerial reconnaissance mission around Kussen, penetrating enemy lines for 20 km (12 mi) at a height of 200 m (656 ft). Despite heavy opposition from enemy anti-aircraft fire and fighters, Karpeyev was able to complete the mission, additionally destroying two cars and starting a fire as he returned to his own lines. A week later, on 12 January, Karpeyev again carried out a reconnaissance mission, flying with four cameras on his aircraft, supported by five Ilyushin Il-2s and twelve Yakovlev Yak-3s. His aircraft was badly damaged by heavy anti-aircraft fire, but he was able to complete the mission and make it back to base. Another sortie on 14 January targeted enemy forces, with Karpeyev setting a tank on fire, suppressing three anti-aircraft gun positions, and killing up to ten enemy troops.

On 15 February, Karpeyev was again carrying out aerial reconnaissance, this time of retreating enemy forces along the Vistula Spit. He made four sorties that day, again killing up to ten enemy troops. On 21 February, flying an Ilyushin Il-2, he attacked artillery positions, destroying two field guns, killing up to five troops, and starting a fire. On 11 March, again flying an Ilyushin Il-2, he led an attack on vessels southwest of Königsberg, bombing and sinking a barge. Karpeyev was then awarded the Order of the Red Banner, for courage and valour having successfully completed 24 combat sorties in the Ilyushin Il-2 against enemy units.

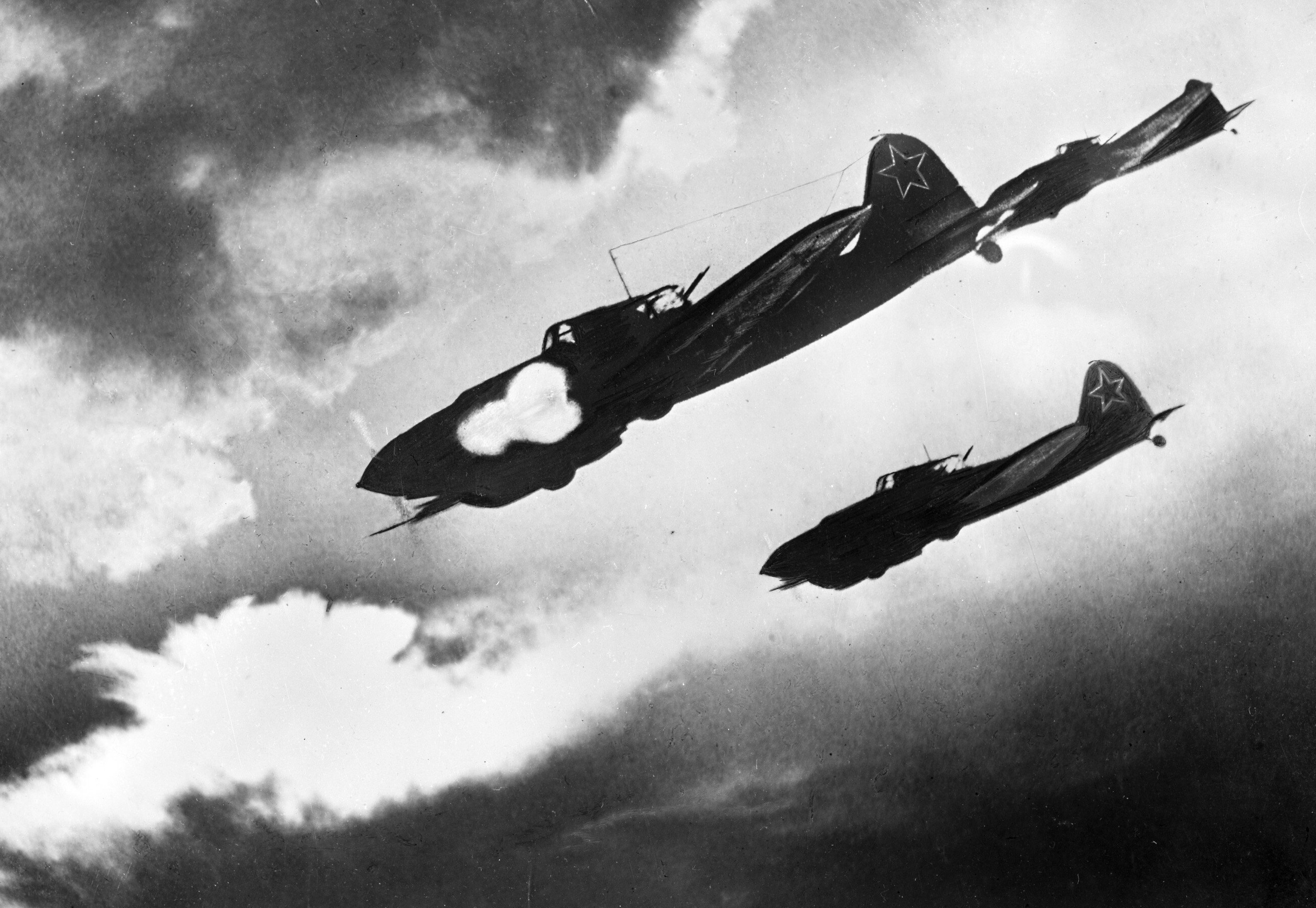
Ilyushin Il-2s in action. Karpeyev's later service flying these planes resulted in his award of the title of Hero of the Soviet Union.

Karpeyev continued to be heavily engaged with enemy forces over the following months until the end of the war. On 24 March 1945, he carried out a sortie in the region of Bregde, and despite heavy anti-aircraft fire, made five approaches to the target, destroying a tank, at least two artillery batteries, and starting a fire. On 16 April, he flew four sorties, each time approaching at low altitude to attack enemy forces, despite heavy anti-aircraft fire.

=== Mission totals and reward ===
By May 1945, Karpeyev had carried out 100 sorties in the Ilyushin Il-2 against enemy forces, and 85 nighttime bombing sorties on the Polikarpov Po-2. He had also flown Polikarpov Po-2s on ten reconnaissance missions, and five to deliver food to partisan forces. He had flown 110 combat missions after being wounded, making a total of 310 combat missions. He had personally destroyed or damaged 15 tanks, 4 self-propelled guns, 27 transport vehicles, 17 field guns, and up to 20 carts and 17 residential buildings, killing some 200 enemy troops. He had also suppressed anti-aircraft fire from 40 enemy guns, started up to 50 fires, and flown 8 reconnaissance missions. On 29 June 1945, the Presidium of the Supreme Soviet awarded Karpeyev the title of Hero of the Soviet Union, number 8727, with the accompanying Order of Lenin, number 55021.

== Postwar service ==
With the end of the war, Karpeyev remained in the armed forces, travelling to Grozny in 1946 to take the advanced qualification courses for squadron commanders, and in 1952 graduated from the Air Force Academy. In May that year he was appointed deputy head of flight training at Kachinsk Military Aviation School, initially in Michurinsk, and relocated to Stalingrad in 1954. In May 1960, he became head of the training and flight department at the Kharkov Higher Military Aviation School of Pilots. Between December 1962 and February 1966, Karpeyev was on a special mission to Afghanistan, and on his return he became head of the school's department of air force tactics.

== Retirement and later life ==
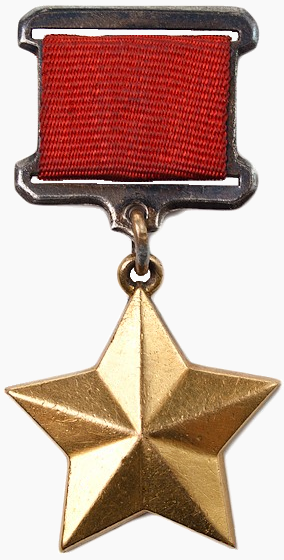
The gold star of the Hero of the Soviet Union, the highest Soviet military award

Karpeyev retired from the military on age grounds on 1 April 1978, leaving with the rank of colonel. He went to work as a senior engineer at the Kharkiv Tractor Plant until 1993, and continued to be active in patriotic activities, and with schools and universities. On 29 April 2005, shortly before the 60th anniversary Victory Day celebrations, Karpeyev was appointed an honorary major general of aviation by decree of the President of Ukraine Viktor Yushchenko.

Karpeyev lived in Kharkiv for the last years of his life, dying there on 7 June 2021, aged 98. He had received numerous awards and honours over his long career. In addition to the title of Hero of the Soviet Union, and the Order of Lenin, he had received two Orders of the Red Banner, on 14 July 1944 and 19 April 1945, the Order of Alexander Nevsky on 29 April 1945, two Orders of the Patriotic War First Class, on 7 February 1945 and 11 March 1985, the Order of the Red Star, the Order "For Service to the Homeland in the Armed Forces of the USSR" Third Class, 29 medals, and the title of Merited Railway Worker. He was an honorary citizen of Kharkiv since 2013, and received the Order of Bohdan Khmelnytsky Third Class from Ukraine. His name is recorded in Kaliningrad on the memorial Heroes of the Storming of Königsberg. After a farewell ceremony at the Ivan Kozhedub National Air Force University, he was buried in the village of Rohan, in Kharkiv Oblast on 9 June. At the time of his death he was the last Hero of the Soviet Union living in Kharkiv Oblast.
