= Tenäk Temejĕ =

Tenäk Temejĕ (Chuvash: Теняк Темейĕ, pronounced [teˈnʲak teˈmejɘ]), Russian: Temey Tenyakov) was a Chuvash nobleman and the last native Chuvash to hold the title pü, which is equivalent to the European prince and the Russian knyaz. His name occurs in financial documents from the 1620s and in Chuvash legends.

The Chuvash feudal system that existed in the Khanate of Kazan was abandoned soon after the Chuvash country was annexed by Russia. A great part of Chuvash aristocracy was killed during the invasion of the Khanate of Kazan by the Muscovites (1545–1552) and subsequent uprisings (1552–1585). The survivors became vassals of the Russian Tsar and in a short time lost their status as noblemen, their real properties being awarded to Russian landlords and monasteries.

In the 17th century, there still existed a number of Chuvash noblemen of low and middle rank, i.e. sergeants (vunpü), lieutenants (śĕrpü) and tarkhans (turxan) who were equated by the authorities to Russian servicemen. The only high-rank Chuvash nobleman that is mentioned in the contemporary Russian sources is the "knyaz Temey Tenyakov". In the Chuvash system, he held the title pü, corresponding to Common Turkic beg or bey.

According to Russian documents, on 12 May 1625, the Chuvash knyaz Temey Tenyakov and his companions were granted fields along the Little Autla River (now in Jĕpreś district of Chuvashia) by the voivode of Cheboksary Nikita Likharev. At that time, Tenyakov served as a lieutenant in the Sherdan volost of the Cheboksarsky Uyezd. His residence was located in the village of Măn Pükassi ('Prince's big village' in Chuvash). The location of Tenyakov's residence in Măn Pükassi is further confirmed by Chuvash legends.

In a legend recorded in 1969 in the village of Načar Čemurša, Tenäk Temejĕ is described as a cruel landlord who dispossessed Chuvash peasants of their lands. To escape from his atrocities, all Tatar and almost all Chuvash inhabitants of Načar Čemurša left the village.

In his book The ancient Chuvashes, the novelist Mišši Juhma depicts Tenäk Temejĕ as a betrayer of the Chuvash people who assisted the Russian authorities whilst most of his bannermen supported anti-Muscovite resistance movement. However, after a while he repented and joined the Chuvash rebels. He raised an army and took the fortress of Śĕrpü (Tsivilsk). Then he marched his army to the town of Sĕve but was captured by the Russians. He was enchained and brought to the Tsar. His further fate is unknown
