= Vasily Andrianov =

Vasily Andrianov may refer to:

- Vasily Andrianov (politician) (1902–1978), Soviet politician
- Vasily Andrianov (pilot) (1920–1999), Soviet Air Force major general
