= Ivan Timokhovich =

Soviet historian and academician (1922–1994)

Ivan Vasilievich Timokhovich
- Иван Васильевич Тимохович
- Born: 23 May 1922; Druchany, Mogilyov, Byelorussia
- Died: 13 May 1994 (aged 71); Berezino, Belarus
- Education: Gagarin Air Force Academy
- Known for: Contributions to the air force history
- Scientific career
- Fields: Military history
- Workplaces: The General Staff Academy of the Armed Forces of the Russian Federation Gagarin Air Force Academy

Ivan Vasilievich Timokhovich (Russian: Иван Васильевич Тимохович; 23 May 1922 – 13 May 1994) was a Russian military historian, Doctor of Historical Sciences, professor, Honored Scientist of Russia, Associate Member of the Russian Academy of Natural Sciences, Major General, Russian Air Force.

A common alternative transliteration of his name is Timohovich. The name in works published in English – I.V. Timokhovich.

Timokhovich's works on history of operations of the air force in World War II are widely cited in research publications both in Russia, and worldwide.

== Biography ==
He was born on 23 Ma 1922 in Druchany (Russian: Дручаны), Bialynichy District, Mahilyow Region, Byelorussian Soviet Socialist Republic.

He participated in World War II. He was a veteran of the 2nd Air Army. He also participated in the Battle of Kursk.

A large part of his life, research and teaching career are connected with the Gagarin Air Force Academy (Russian: Военно-воздушная академия им. Ю.А. Гагарина), located in Monino (Russian: Монино), Moscow Region. Timokhovich's name is mentioned several times in the official history of the academy.

He graduated from the Gagarin Air Force Academy in 1950 with Honors and Gold Medal.

He earned a degree of the candidate of historical sciences in 1954 (Ph.D. equivalent).

He earned a degree of the Doctor of Historical Sciences in 1970. Thesis: Advances of the Air Force operational art during the Great Patriotic War.

From 1974 – Professor at The General Staff Academy of the Armed Forces of the Russian Federation.

Since 1976 – Major General Air Force.

Since 1990 – Leading Scientific fellow at the Institute for Military History of the Russian Ministry of Defense. Contribution of I.V. Timokhovich in the “research of the military history” has been noted by the Director of the Institute for Military History in his article commemorating the 40th anniversary of the Institute.

In an article commemorating the 175th anniversary of The General Staff Academy of the Armed Forces of the Russian Federation, professor Timokhovich is noted among the scientists whose names have been rightfully “engraved in gold letters in the history of military science”.

He died in Berezino, Republic of Belarus on 13 May 1994.

== Works ==
=== Books ===
- Тимохович И.В. Советская авиация в битве под Курском. (Soviet Aviation in the Battle of Kursk) — М.: Воениздат, 1959. — 120 с.
- Тимохович И.В. Развитие оперативного искусства Военио-воздушных сил в Великой Отечественной войне, (Advances in the Air Force operational art during the Great Patriotic War) Дис. докт. ист. наук – Монино: ВВА, 1970.
- Тимохович И.В. Оперативное искусство советских ВВС в Великой Отечественной войне. — М., Воениздат, 1976. -343 с. Circulation 18,000.
  - English translation: I. V Timokhovich “The operational art of the Soviet Air Force during the Great Patriotic War”. Translation Division, Foreign Technology Division, 1977, 665 pages. ASIN: B00072K63C.
- Тимохович И.В. В небе войны. 1941–1945. (In the Skies of War) 2-е изд., перераб.и доп. – М., Воениздат, 1986. – 332 с. Circulation 30,000.
- Тимохович И.В. Битва за Белоруссию: 1941–1944. (The Battle for Belorussia) – Мн.: Беларусь, 1994. – 254с.
- Ларионов В., Тимохович И. Битва за Берлин. (The Battle for Berlin) М. Прогресс, 1987 г. In Arabic.
- Y Larionov, N Yeronin, B Solovyov, V. Timokhovich, World War II Decisive Battles of the Soviet Army, Moscow: Progress, 1984. ISBN 978-0-8285-2955-6

=== Articles ===
- Тимохович И., Ольштынский Л. Взаимодействие ВВС с авиацией ВМФ по опыту третьего периода войны.(Interaction of the Air Force with Navy aviation based on the experience of the third period of war (World War II)) Военно-исторический журнал, 1978, No.3.
- Тимохович И. Взаимодействие авиации с сухопутными войсками во фронтовой наступательной операции. Военно-исторический журнал, 1977, No.7.
  - English translation: Air Force Support of Ground Forces Based on Wartime Experience. Translations on the USSR Military Affairs. No. 1299, JPRS, 1977, pp. 38 – 43.
- Тимохович И. Советские ВВС в обороне и контрнаступлении под Курском. (Soviet Air Force in the defensive and counteroffensive operation in the Battle for Kursk) Военно-исторический журнал, 1973, No.7.
- Тимохович И. Авиационная поддержка и прикрытие танковых армий по опыту наступательных операций. (Air support and air cover for tank troops based on the experience of offensive operations) Военно-исторический журнал, 1974, No.5.
- Тимохович И. Взаимодействие авиации с сухопутными войсками по опыту фронтовых наступательных операций.(Interaction of the Air Force with ground troops in the frontal attack operations) Военная мысль, 1972, No.9.
- Тимохович И. Некоторые вопросы оперативного искусства ВВС. (On some issues of the Air Force operational art) Военно-исторический журнал, 1971, No.11.
- Тимохович И. На главном направлении. Висло-Одерская операция. (On the main direction. Vistula–Oder Offensive) Красная звезда. 12 января, 1980.
- I. V. Timokhovich “The operational art of the Soviet Air Force in the Great Patriotic War compared with In the skies of war, 1941–1945”. Dept. of the Air Force, 1988. ASIN: B00072QP6O. 48 pages.

== Awards ==
- Order of the Red Banner of Labour
- Order of the Red Star
- Order of the Patriotic War
- Order for Service to the Homeland in the Armed Forces of the USSR
