= Ivan Alekseevich Vorobyov =

Soviet air force Ilyushin Il-2 (1921–1991)

Ivan Alekseyevich Vorobyov
- Иван Алексеевич Воробьёв
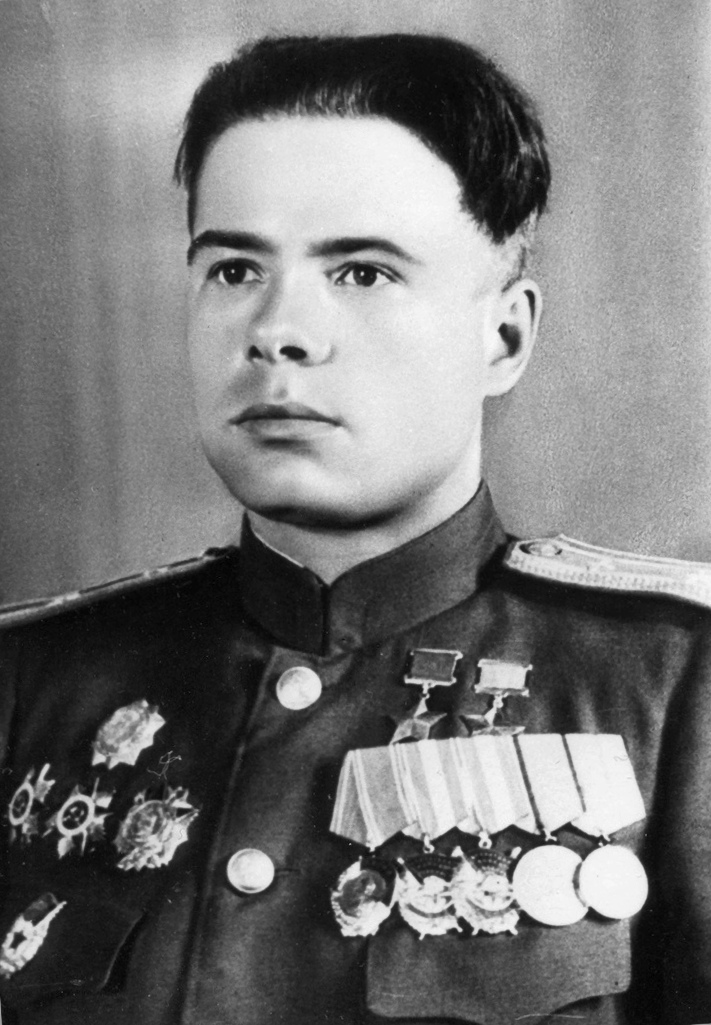
- Vorobyov in 1945
- Born: 26 August 1921; Gorbachevo village, Tula Governorate, RSFSR
- Died: 17 March 1991 (aged 69); Kiev, Ukrainian SSR, USSR
- Military career
- Allegiance: Soviet Union
- Branch: Soviet Air Force
- Service years: 1939–1973
- Rank: Colonel
- Unit: 76th Guards Attack Aviation Regiment
- Conflicts: World War II
- Awards: Hero of the Soviet Union (twice)

Ivan Alekseyevich Vorobyov (Russian: Ива́н Алексе́евич Воробьёв; 26 August 1921 — 17 March 1991) was an Il-2 pilot in the Soviet Air Force during World War II who was twice awarded the title Hero of the Soviet Union.

== Early life ==
Vorobyov was born on 26 August 1921 to a Russian peasant family. After completing seven grades of school he worked at a collective farm before moving to the city of Yefremov, where he got an apprenticeship and worked at a factory. He then entered the military in November 1939, having recently completing training at the local OSOAVIAHIM aeroclub. Due to military restructuring he was not able to begin flight school in Tambov until January 1940, which he graduated from in July 1941. Although Germany had already begun invading the Soviet Union, he was not immediately deployed to the front; initially he served as a flight instructor in Chuvashia until February 1942 and then as a pilot in the 46th Reserve Aviation Regiment until June, after which he was deployed to the front.

== World War II ==
Upon arriving at the Stalingrad front in August 1942 he first saw combat as a pilot in 709th Night Bomber Aviation Regiment, which used the Po-2. There he fought in the battles for Stalingrad and Rostov, during which he flew 78 sorties but was injured on 1943; he was confined to a hospital for some time due to the fragments in his temple and shoulder, but he was able to begin training on the Il-2 in March. After completing training in June he was reassigned to the 76th Guards Attack Aviation Regiment, which used the Il-2. In 1944 he became a member of the Communist Party of the Soviet Union. After flying 107 missions in the Il-2 he was first nominated for the title Hero of the Soviet Union, which was awarded on 19 August 1944. On 6 October 1944, less than two months after receiving the title, he led an attack on a heavily protected artillery position; during the attack he spotted two additional mortar batteries firing at Soviet troops, so he decided to take them out as well. After making eight passes at the units, he and the other aircraft under his command took out two mortar batteries and twelve ground vehicles. Two weeks later his face was injured from shrapnel of an anti-aircraft shell, but the wounds were not serious. By the time he was nominated for the title Hero of the Soviet Union again on 15 April 1945 he had flown 207 sorties on the Il-2; he was awarded the title after the end of the war on 29 June 1945. By then he had flown a total of 298 sorties, of which 78 were on the Po-2 and 220 on the Il-2.

During the war he flew in a variety of combat operations including the battles for Donbas, Crimea, Minsk, Vitebsk, Vilnius, and Königsberg. Despite being in combat for less than two year and entering the regiment as a regular pilot, he quickly rose through the ranks to the position of squadron commander with the rank of major.

== Postwar ==
Vorobyov remained in his wartime regiment until March 1947 when he became a squadron commander in the 136th Guards Attack Aviation Regiment, which used the Il-2 and Il-10. He left the unit in August 1948 and went on to graduate from the Air Force Academy in 1952, after which he became deputy commander of flight training in the 580th Attack Aviation Regiment. In 1954 he participated in the polar expedition "North-B", which was tasked with constructing airfields in the arctic. That year he graduated from the Voroshilovgrad Military Aviation School of Pilots; he then was assigned to the 1000th Aviation Regiment, which he was promoted to commander of in November 1955 before being placed in command of the 772th Training Aviation Regiment in January 1958. Shortly before the end of the year he was made head of the 24th Military Aviation School of Pilot Training in Kazakhstan, but in June 1960 he was reassigned to Krasnodar as the head of a school for air gunners. In November 1966 he became chief of staff of the Lugansk Higher Military Aviation School of Navigators until he was promoted to deputy head of the in 1969. He retired from the military in 1973; during his career he flew the Il-2, Il-10, Yak-18, Li-2, An-24. As a civilian he worked in Kiev for the Ministry of Chemical and Petroleum Engineering. He died on 17 March 1991 and was buried in the Baikov Cemetery.

== Awards and honors ==
- Twice Hero of the Soviet Union (19 August 1944 and 29 June 1945)
- Three Order of Lenin (19 August 1944, 19 August 1945, and 29 June 1945)
- Two Order of the Red Banner (12 November 1943 and 2 February 1944)
- Order of Bodgan Khmelnitsky 3rd class (20 April 1945)
- Order of Alexander Nevsky (3 July 1944)
- Three Order of the Patriotic War 1st class (1st class - 2 November 1944 and 11 March 1985; 2nd class - 29 April 1944);
- Two Order of the Red Star (29 August 1955 and 30 December 1956)
- campaign, service, and jubilee medals
