= Pavel Andreyevich Galkin =

Soviet pilot (1922–2021)

- Павел Андреевич Галкин
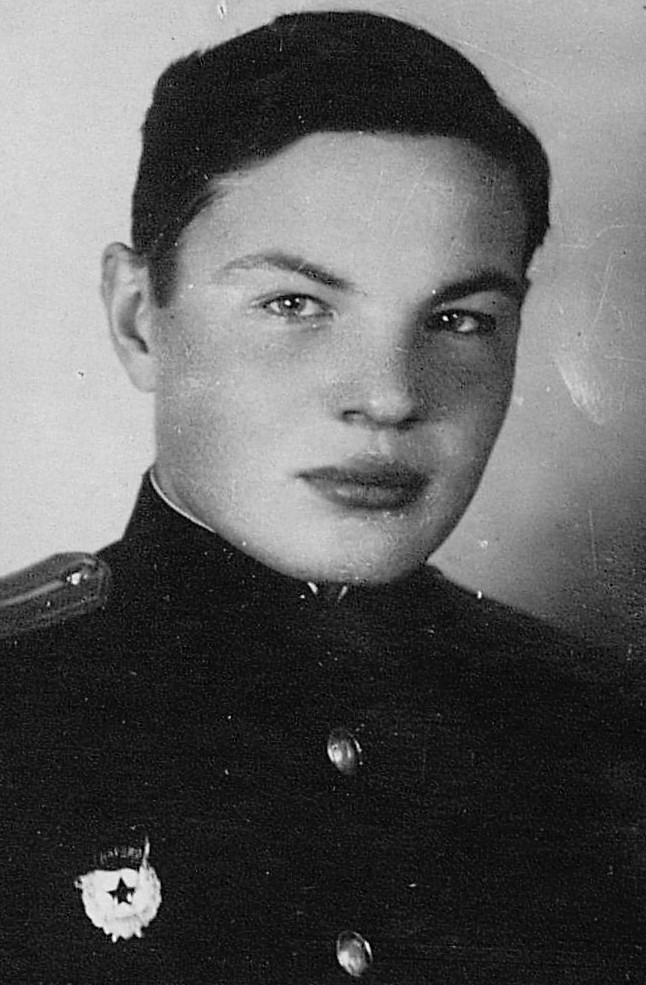
- Born: 15 December 1922; Nizhnyaya Ishchered, Ryazan Governorate, Russian SFSR
- Died: 15 June 2021 (aged 98); Yeysk, Russian Federation
- Military career
- Allegiance: USSR
- Branch: Soviet Naval Aviation
- Service years: 1940–1978
- Rank: Colonel
- Conflicts: Second World War
- Awards: Hero of the Soviet Union

Pavel Andreyevich Galkin (Russian: Павел Андреевич Галкин; 15 December 1922 – 15 June 2021) was an officer of the Soviet military who held a number of posts in Soviet Naval Aviation, reaching the rank of colonel. A veteran of the Second World War, he was a recipient of the title of Hero of the Soviet Union.

Galkin entered the armed forces in 1940, shortly before the Axis invasion of the Soviet Union the following year, and was initially assigned to the Soviet Navy as an anti-aircraft battery gunner with the coastal defence forces. Following the outbreak of war he studied at the Nikolaev Naval Aviation School, graduating in July 1943, as a crew navigator and was sent to the front lines. Initially assigned to the 29th Bomber Aviation Regiment at Murmansk as part of the Northern Fleet, flying the Petlyakov Pe-2, Galkin was subsequently transferred to the 9th Guards Torpedo Aviation Regiment, in the 5th Torpedo Aviation Division, flying the Boston A-20G. He was part of the aircraft crew of Yevgeny Frantsev and Semyon Antipichev, who together scored notable successes against enemy forces. In 1944 Galkin and Frantsev were awarded the title of Hero of the Soviet Union. Galkin was unable to take part in a later mission, during which Frantsev and Antipichev were killed.

Galkin remained in the armed forces after the war, graduating from the Air Force Academy in 1956, and becoming a teacher at the Kachinsk Military Aviation School, and later the Yeysk Higher Military Aviation School, until his retirement in May 1978. Though retired from active service, Galkin maintained his connection with the armed forces, working as head of the educational and methodological office at the Yeysk Higher Military Aviation School between 1982 and 1996. In retirement Galkin lived in Yeysk, working in veterans' affairs, before his death in 2021 at the age of 98. He had received numerous honours and awards over his long career.

== Early life and career ==
Galkin was born on 15 December 1922 into a Russian family in the village of Nizhnyaya Ishchered, in what was then Ryazan Governorate, in the Russian Soviet Federal Socialist Republic. His father had been a sailor of the Baltic Fleet and a member of the Kronstadt Military Revolutionary Council, who took part in many of the events of the Russian Revolution in Petrograd. A firm believer in communism, who had seen Vladimir Lenin give his speech from his armoured car, he had returned to his home town on holiday in 1921, but stayed to build Soviet power. He served on the Road of Life during the siege of Leningrad in the Second World War and was wounded, later dying at the 1st Naval Hospital, and being buried at the Piskarevskoye Cemetery.

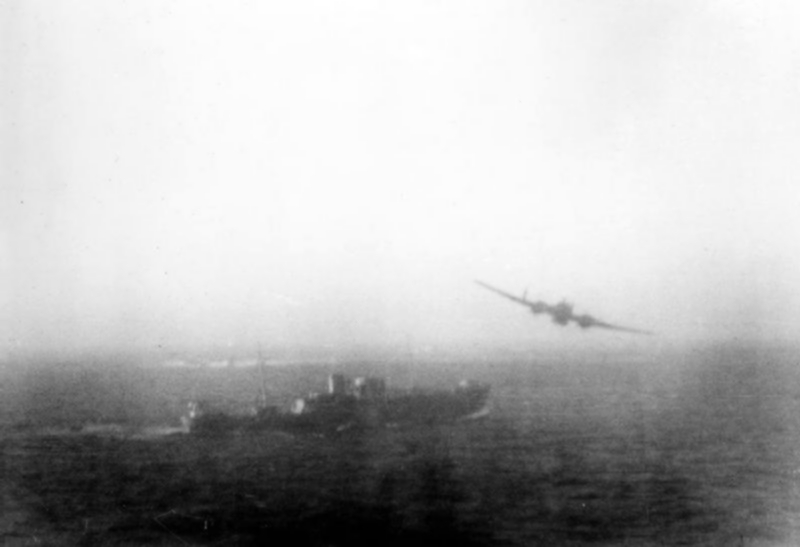
An air attack on a German supply ship in northern waters. Galkin spent much of the war undertaking such missions.

Growing up, his son Pavel nearly drowned three times, the first time when he was six, in the river Mostya, and a second time while travelling to school in Pustotino by boat across a semi-frozen river. He declined to talk about the third time, but concluded that he was not destined to die by water, later carrying a handkerchief embroidered by his mother in his pocket as a talisman when he flew in action. He attended the pedagogical college in the nearby settlement of Sapozhok, graduating in 1940 with the specialty of a teacher in Russian language and literature. He joined the Soviet Navy in September that year, and was initially posted to Leningrad as an anti-aircraft battery gunner with the coastal defence forces. He served during the first years of the Axis invasion of the Soviet Union, which began in 1941, and in 1943 graduated from the Nikolaev Naval Aviation School. Because of the war, the school had been evacuated to Bezenchuk, Kuybyshev Oblast. He was promptly posted to serve on the front lines from July 1943, as a crew navigator with Soviet Naval Aviation, rising to flight navigator from May 1944. In common with many of his compatriots, he joined the Communist Party of the Soviet Union, in 1944.

== Wartime service ==
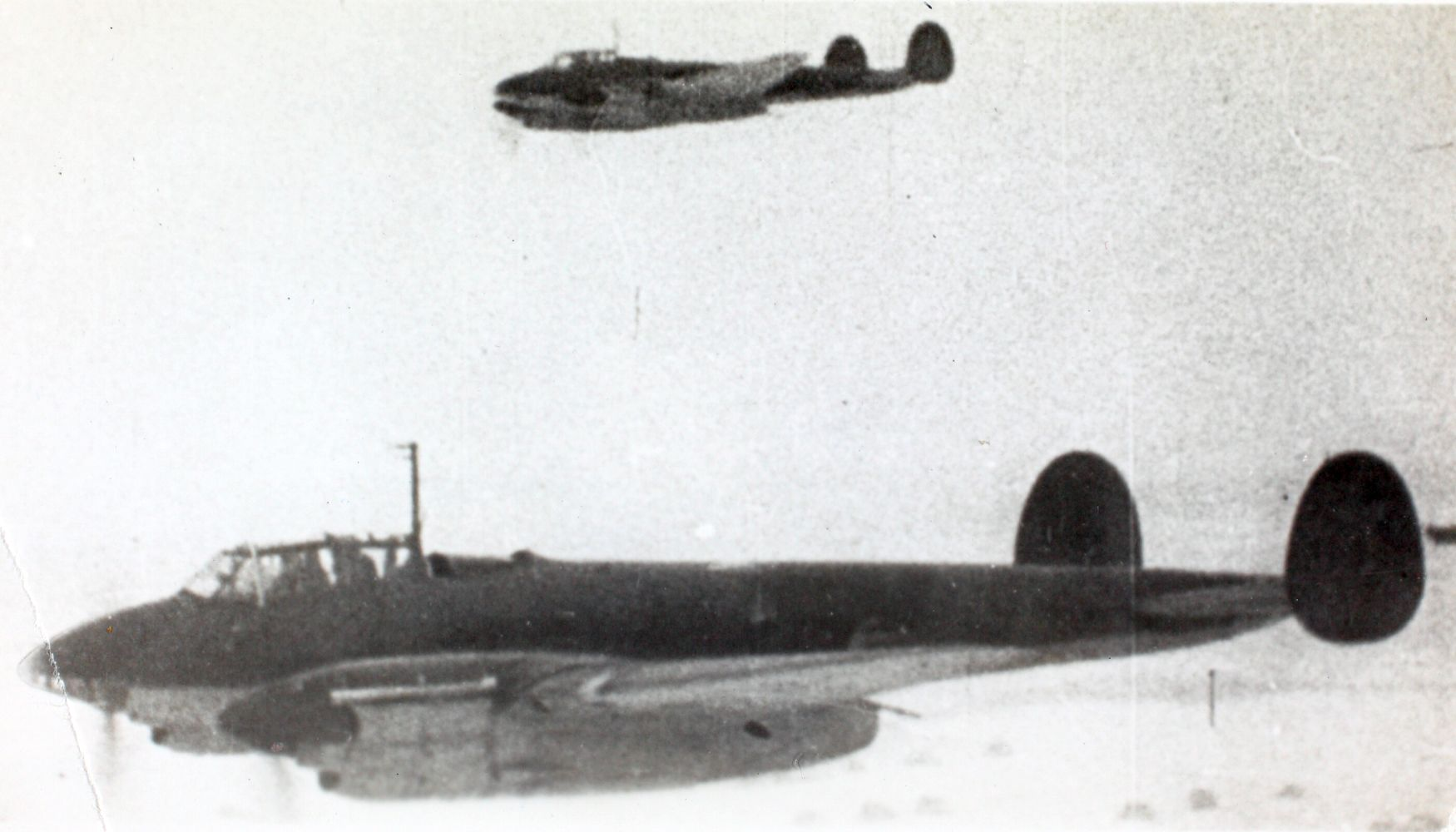
Petlyakov Pe-2s in flight. Galkin's initial service with the Northern Fleet aviation was flying aboard this type of aircraft.

Galkin was initially assigned to the 29th Bomber Aviation Regiment, assigned to Murmansk as part of the Northern Fleet, flying the Petlyakov Pe-2 in a crew with pilot Pavel Serdyuk and radio operator Boris Borovoy. Borovoy was badly injured during one mission, losing a leg, but surviving. Serdyuk had concealed a secret physical defect sustained from a childhood injury that at times meant he was unable to use his hand. Galkin promised to keep his secret and assist him when needed, but an accident while landing later forced Serdyuk to reveal his condition. He was transferred at his request to fly on attack aircraft, flying more missions and being awarded the Order of the Red Banner, and was later shot down and killed.

Galkin was subsequently transferred to the 9th Guards Torpedo Aviation Regiment, part of the Northern Fleet's 5th Torpedo Aviation Division, flying the Boston A-20G. By now a guards lieutenant, from around October 1943 Galkin was part of the aircraft crew of Yevgeny Frantsev, the commander, and Semyon Antipichev, the gunner-radio operator. Together they would score notable successes against enemy forces. On 21 January 1944 they discovered, torpedoed and sank a German submarine off Inge Island, and on 3 March 1944 they sank an 8,000 ton transport off Varangerfjord. On 4 March 1944 they sank another submarine to the north of Kvaløya. When moving away from the target, the aircraft received serious damage, the radio operator was wounded, but the crew managed to bring the aircraft back to their airfield.

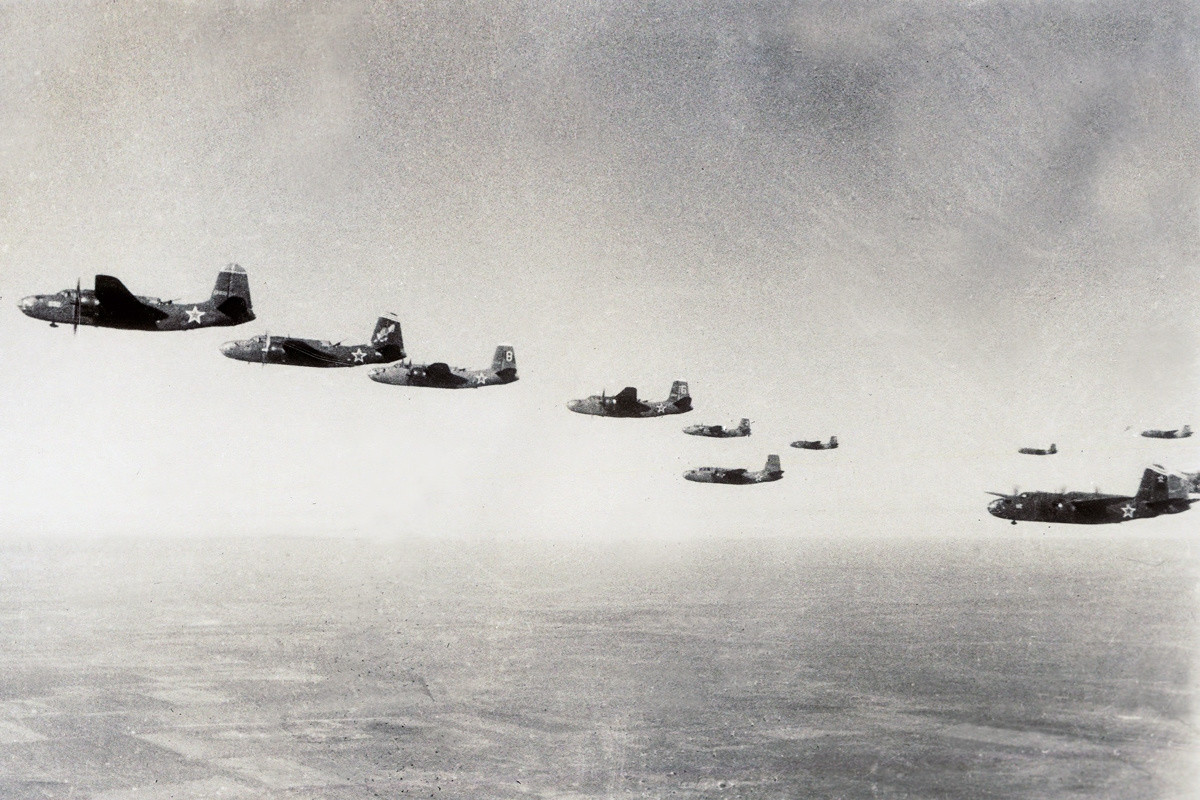
Boston A-20Gs in Soviet service. Galkin's later service was spent on these aircraft, winning distinction in attacks on enemy shipping.

By April 1944 they had made 22 sorties together, sinking two submarines, two transports and a tanker, as well as receiving joint credit with their group for the sinking of a further two transports. On 5 April 1944 the acting commander of the 9th Guards Torpedo Aviation Regiment, Major Litvinov, nominated Galkin for the title of Hero of the Soviet Union. On 19 August 1944 the Presidium of the Supreme Soviet awarded Galkin the title of Hero of the Soviet Union, number 4046, with the accompanying Order of Lenin, number 19103. His commander, Yevgeny Frantsev, was awarded the Hero of the Soviet Union at the same time.

The following mission was a proposed attack on a transport ship in Porsangerfjorden, which Galkin helped to plan. Before the attack could take place, on 12 September 1944 Galkin underwent an operation. Frantsev took over the role of navigator, with the head of the torpedo service Legkodymov as pilot, and on 15 September flew to carry out the attack. The crew subsequently reported by radio "Porsangerfjord. Attacked transport. Transport sank. Coming back." but were never seen again. With the loss of his former crew, Galkin was assigned to the Naval Aviation Higher Officer Courses, and was studying at Mozdok when the war ended.

== Postwar ==
Galkin remained serving with Soviet Naval Aviation after the war, transferring to the Baltic Fleet's 51st Torpedo Aviation Regiment in late May - early June 1945. He graduated from the Air Force Academy in 1956, and later that year was appointed a teacher at the Kachinsk Military Aviation School. In 1967 he became head of the department of combat weapons at the Yeysk Higher Military Aviation School, a post he held until his retirement in May 1978 with the rank of colonel. Though retired from active service, Galkin maintained his connection with the armed forces, working as head of the educational and methodological office at the Yeysk Higher Military Aviation School between 1982 and 1996.

Galkin settled in Yeysk, and in 1997 became a member of the city administration's council of elders, and a member of the presidium of the Yeysk veterans' council. In 2010 be became an honorary citizen of Yeysk. He died on 15 June 2021 at the age of 98. At the time of his death he was the last member of the Yeysk veterans' council, which in 1990 had consisted of 126 Heroes of the Soviet Union, and 27 holders of the Order of Glory First Class. His funeral service was held at the local house of culture on 17 June, after which he was buried with military honours in Yeysk's New Cemetery, next to his wife.

== Honours and awards ==
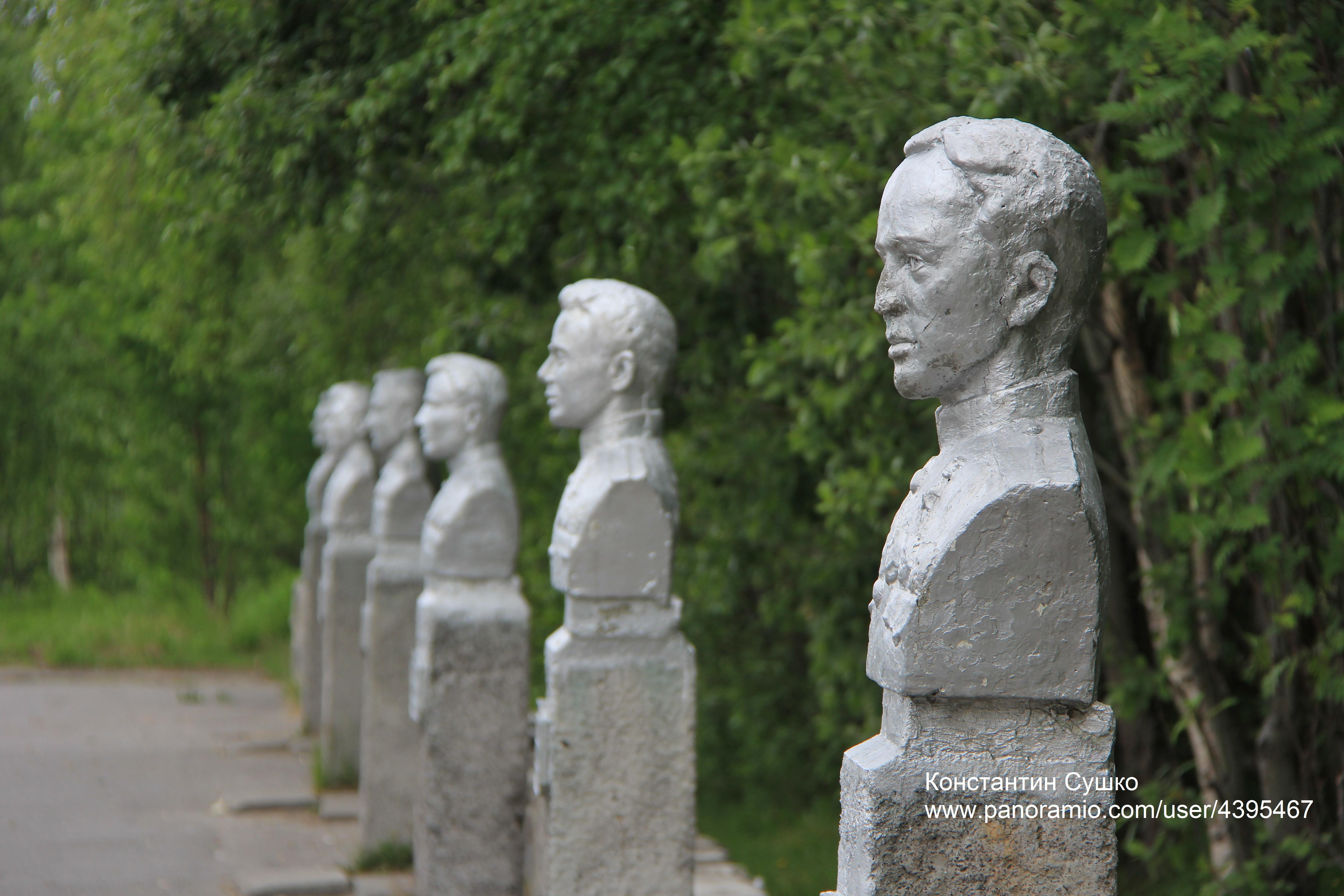
Busts in the Alley of Hero-Aviators in Safonovo. Galkin is one of the 53 aviators so honoured.

In addition to the title of Hero of the Soviet Union and the accompanying Order of Lenin, Galkin was twice awarded the Order of the Red Banner, on 27 January 1944, and 10 April 1944, the Order of the Patriotic War First Class on 11 March 1985, the Order of the Red Star, the Order "For Service to the Homeland in the Armed Forces of the USSR" Third Class, and various medals. In addition to his military medals, he was also honoured with the unveiling of a bust at the Alley of Hero-Aviators of the Northern Fleet, at the Museum of Aviation of the Northern Fleet, in Safonovo, Murmansk Oblast. This was one of 53 busts of Northern Fleet naval aviators who had been awarded the title of Hero of the Soviet Union. He was interviewed by the Ryazan edition of Komsomolskaya Pravda in 2020, with the interviews serialized over four editions between July and August 2020.
