= Vasily Andrianov (pilot) =

Soviet Air Force major general

Vasily Ivanovich Andrianov
- Василий Иванович Андрианов
- Born: 13 August 1920; Ivanisovo village, Tver Governorate, RSFSR
- Died: 7 May 1999 (aged 78); Moscow, Russia
- Burial place: Troyekurovskoye Cemetery
- Military career
- Allegiance: Soviet Union
- Branch: Soviet Air Force
- Service years: 1940–1981
- Rank: Major general
- Commands: 118th Guards Attack Aviation Regiment
- Conflicts: World War II; Battle of Kursk; Belgorod-Kharkov Offensive; Battle of the Dnieper; Korsun-Shevchenkovsky Offensive; Uman–Botosani Offensive; Second Jassy–Kishinev Offensive; Lvov-Sandomierz Offensive; Berlin Offensive
- Awards: Hero of the Soviet Union (twice)

Vasily Ivanovich Andrianov (Russian: Василий Иванович Андрианов; 13 August 1920 – 7 May 1999) was a Soviet Air Force major general and twice Hero of the Soviet Union. Andrianov was awarded the title Hero of the Soviet Union twice for making 177 successful attack missions during World War II. Postwar, Andrianov continued his career in the Air Force and taught at the Military Academy of the General Staff. After retiring in 1981 as a Major general, Andrianov died in 1999 and was buried at the Troyekurovskoye Cemetery.

== Early life ==
Andrianov was born on 13 August 1920 in the village of Ivanisovo in Tver Governorate to a peasant family. He spent his childhood and teenage years in the village of Sonkovo. In 1936, he graduated from eight grades. Andrianov graduated from the Smolensk Co-operative College in 1938. Between 1939 and 1940, he worked as a military instructor at the Sonkovo High School. In July 1940, Andrianov was drafted into the Red Army. He graduated from the Leningrad Military District Junior Aviation Specialists School in September. He became a gunner and radio operator in a heavy bomber regiment located in the district.

== World War II ==
In September 1941, Andrianov graduated from the 2nd Moscow Military Aviation School for initial pilot training. He was then sent to the Molotov (Perm) Military Aviation School for more pilot training. After graduation in April 1943, Andrianov became a pilot in the 10th Reserve Aviation Regiment in Kamenka with the rank of junior lieutenant. In June, he transferred to the 667th Attack Aviation Regiment flying the Il-2, which was part of the Voronezh Front.

Andrianov first flew attack sorties during the Battle of Kursk. On 24 July, he took part in an attack on the Belgorod railway station. The regiment then supported advancing Soviet troops during the Belgorod-Kharkov Offensive in August. On 31 August, he was awarded the Order of the Patriotic War 1st class. In the fall, Andrianov fought in the Battle of the Dnieper. He was awarded the Order of the Red Banner on 11 October. On 28 December, he was awarded the Order of Glory 3rd class. In January 1944, he fought in the Kirovograd Offensive. Around this time, Andrianov joined the Communist Party of the Soviet Union. He then fought in the Battle of the Korsun–Cherkassy Pocket until February. At this time, the regiment became the 141st Guards Attack Aviation Regiment for its actions. In March and April, Andrianov flew in the Uman–Botoșani Offensive. On 24 April, he was promoted to lieutenant and became a squadron commander. He was awarded the title Hero of the Soviet Union and the Order of Lenin on 1 July for completing 87 attack sorties. On 17 July, he was awarded a third Order of the Red Banner. Andrianov fought in the Second Jassy–Kishinev Offensive in August. The regiment was then transferred and fought in the later stages of the Lvov–Sandomierz Offensive. He was promoted to senior lieutenant on 25 September.

From 12 January 1945, the regiment fought in the Sandomierz–Silesian Offensive. Andrianov fought in the battles and in the subsequent Lower Silesian Offensive in February and the Upper Silesian Offensive in March. On 22 February, he was awarded the Order of Alexander Nevsky. He was promoted to captain on 4 April. In April, Andrianov and the regiment fought in the Berlin Offensive, before being transferred in early May to fight in the Prague Offensive. On 25 April, Andrianov was awarded his third Order of the Red Banner. During the war, Andrianov made 180 sorties on the Il-2. His crew was reported to have shot down two enemy aircraft and shared three other victories. On 27 June 1945, he was awarded the title Hero of the Soviet Union a second time for the completion of 177 sorties by April 1945.

== Postwar ==
Until June 1946, Andrianov continued to serve as a squadron commander in the regiment. On 6 May 1949, he was promoted to major. In 1950, he graduated from the Air Force Academy at Monino. He then became commander of the 118th Guards Attack Aviation Regiment in Estonia. On 15 November, he was awarded the Medal for Battle Merit. On 9 January 1952, he was promoted to lieutenant colonel. Andrianov became an Adjunct professor at the Department of Attack Aviation Tactics in the Air Force Academy in 1953. He became a pilot-inspector of attack aircraft for the Ministry of Defence Inspectorate. In 1956, Andrianov became the deputy commander of the 172nd Bomber Aviation Division in Poland, which became a fighter-bomber unit the next year. He was awarded the Order of the Red Star on 30 December 1956. On 30 April 1957, he was promoted to colonel. He became chief of staff of the division in 1958 and entered the Military Academy of the General Staff in 1959.

After graduating in 1961, Andrianov became chief of staff of the 289th Fighter-Bomber Aviation Division at Lutsk. Between 1963 and 1964, he was deputy chief of staff of the 57th Air Army at Lviv. In 1964, Andrianov became chief of staff of the Kharkov Higher Military Aviation School. He became a senior lecturer at the Frunze Military Academy in 1966. In 1969, he became a senior lecturer at the Department of Operational Art in the Military Academy of the General Staff. Andrianov was promoted to major general on 8 November 1971 and retired ten years later. In 1973, he became an associate professor. On 30 April 1975, Andrianov received the Order for Service to the Homeland in the Armed Forces of the USSR 3rd class. He lived in Moscow. On 11 March 1985, he was awarded the Order of the Patriotic War 1st class on the 40th anniversary of the end of World War II. Andrianov died on 7 May 1999 and was buried in the Troyekurovskoye Cemetery.

== Awards and honors ==
Hero of the Soviet Union, twice (№ 1976 - 1 July 1944) (№ 6036 - 27 June 1945)
Order of Lenin (1 July 1944)
Order of the Red Banner, three times (11 October 1943, 17 July 1944, 25 April 1945)
Order of Alexander Nevsky (22 February 1945)
Order of the Patriotic War, 1st class, twice (31 August 1943, 11 March 1985)
Order of Glory, 3rd class (28 December 1943)
Medal "For Battle Merit" (15 November 1950)
Order of the Red Star (30 December 1956)
Order "For Service to the Homeland in the Armed Forces of the USSR", 3rd degree (30 April 1975)
Medal of Zhukov (1994)
Medal "For the Liberation of Prague" (1945)
Medal "For the Capture of Berlin" (1945)
Medal "For the Victory over Germany in the Great Patriotic War 1941–1945" (1945)
Cross of Valour (Poland)

- Soviet and Russian jubilee medals
