= Rafael del Pino (pilot) =

Cuban pilot (born 1938)

Rafael del Pino (born September 22, 1938, in Pinar del Río and also known as Rafael del Pino Diaz) is a former Cuban General of the Air Force and political dissident who defected to the United States by flying a civilian airplane from Cuba to Key West, Florida.

== Biography ==
Del Pino joined Fidel Castro's 26th of July Movement at the age of 17, in December 1955. He was arrested and sent to prison in early 1957. After his release he went to exile in Venezuela, where he was arrested during the uprising against dictator Marcos Pérez Jiménez.

In early 1958, he returned to Cuba and joined Fidel Castro's guerrillas in the mountains of Sierra Maestra. By the end of the war against Batista's dictatorship, Del Pino was a first lieutenant.

After the Cuban Revolution, he joined the new Cuban Air Force at the beginning of 1959 and began his flying training to become a fighter pilot. In April 1961, he flew against CIA-sponsored armed forces in the Bay of Pigs Invasion. Flying a Lockheed T-33 jet, he shot down two Douglas B-26 Invaders and sunk several enemy vessels. During the three-day battle, Rafael del Pino flew 25 combat missions. As a result of the decisive role of Cuban pilots during this historic event, president Fidel Castro declared them "Heroes of Playa Giron".

In October 1962, during the Cuban Missile Crisis, General Rafael del Pino was assigned to assist President Fidel Castro in all matters regarding the Air Force. In the days after Kennedy's address announcing a "quarantine" of Cuba, del Pino was sent to a secret underground tunnel near the Almendares River, outside Havana. Castro visited the bunker on October 25. Del Pino recalls Castro raging at the Soviet Union for negotiating with the United States without him and shouting to his Soviet advisors that the Cuban military would fire upon American aircraft in Cuban airspace, before asking del Pino if the Cuban Air Force was capable of shooting down American reconnaissance planes. Del Pino responded in the negative, but Castro insisted on attacking American planes. The next day, del Pino sent Cuban air bases a coded message, telling them to "fire on the Indians."

In 1987, del Pino's antagonism with Fidel Castro and his regime reached the breaking point. He decided to flee on May 28 of that year, flying in an Aero Caribbean twin engine Cessna 402 to Key West, Florida, with all of his family. He became an active promoter of Western democracy for Cuba, founding in 1996, the "Cuban American Military Counsel" (CAMCO) with former opponent Erneido Oliva, second military leader of the 2506 Brigade in the Bay of Pigs invasion.

== Life chronology ==
- 1965 Graduated from the Gagarin Air Force Academy in the Soviet Union.
- 1965-1968 Commander of the Air Force and Air Defenses Eastern Cuban Region.
- 1969 First round of duties in North Vietnam as an adviser.
- 1975 Second round of duties. This time with the Viet Cong in Da-Nang and Saigon.
- 1975-1977 Commander in Chief of the first Cuban Air Force Expeditionary Force in Africa in the Angolan War.
- 1983 Promoted to Brigadier General
- 1984 Commander of the special program “Masters of Air Combat” (Equivalent to Red Flag in USA)
- 1985 Promoted to Deputy Chief of the Cuban Air and Air Defense Force (DAAFAR)
- 1986 Becomes one of the main critics of the Cuban military intervention in Africa.
