= Cheboksarsky Uyezd =

Subdivision of the Kazan Governorate of the Russian Empire

Cheboksarsky Uyezd (Чебокса́рский уе́зд) was one of the subdivisions of the Kazan Governorate of the Russian Empire. It was situated in the western part of the governorate. Its administrative centre was Cheboksary.

== Demographics ==
At the time of the Russian Empire Census of 1897, Cheboksarsky Uyezd had a population of 127,273. Of these, 66.6% spoke Chuvash, 18.7% Russian, 12.0% Mari and 2.7% Tatar as their native language.
