= Mikhail Bondarenko (pilot) =

Soviet aviation commander (1913–1947)

Mikhail Zakharovich Bondarenko
- Михаил Захарович Бондаренко
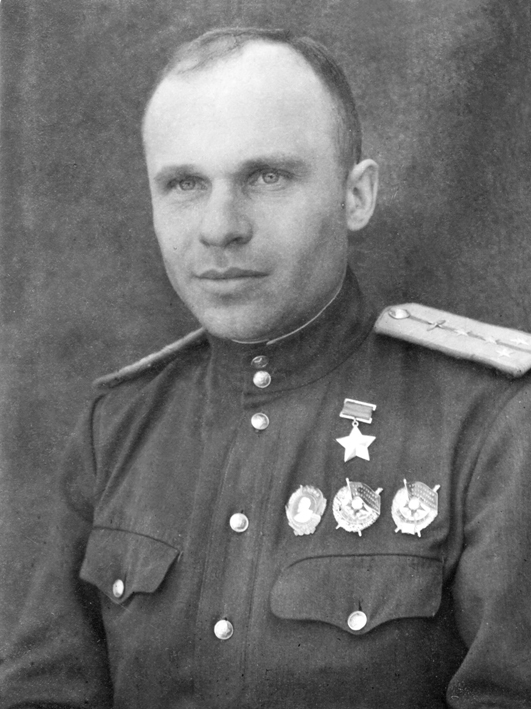
- Born: 20 October [O.S. 7 October] 1913; Bogdanovka, Russian Empire
- Died: 27 July 1947 (aged 33); Olawa, Poland
- Military career
- Service years: 1936–1947
- Rank: Major
- Units: 148th Fighter Aviation Regiment; 198th Assault Aviation Regiment
- Conflicts: World War II; Winter War; Eastern Front
- Awards: Hero of the Soviet Union (twice)

Mikhail Zakharovich Bondarenko (Ukrainian: Миха́йло Заха́рович Бондаре́нко, Russian: Михаи́л Заха́рович Бондаре́нко; 20 October [O.S. 7 October] 1913 – 27 July 1947) was a navigator and squadron commander in the 198th Assault Aviation Regiment of the Soviet Air Forces during the Second World War who was twice awarded the title Hero of the Soviet Union for his ground-attack sorties on the Il-2 during the war.

== Early life ==
Bondarenko was born on 20 October [O.S. 7 October] 1913 to a Ukrainian family in the village of Bogdazovka in the Poltava Governorate of the Russian Empire. He completed his seventh grade of school in 1929, after which he began attending trade school. After graduating from trade school in 1933 he began working as a blacksmith, but he left the job in 1934 to pursue further education at the Kiev Railway Technical College, which he graduated from in 1936. That year he completed training at the local aeroclub before entering the military in August. He was a student at the Kharkov Military Aviation School of Pilots until 1937 and then at the Kachin Military Aviation School of Pilots until 1939, after which he was assigned to the 34th Fighter Aviation Regiment. The unit was based in Moscow and was equipped with I-16 and I-15B fighters. In March 1940 he was deployed to the front of the Winter War as part of the 148th Fighter Regiment, but he only made 17 sorties before the end of the conflict. After the war was over he remained in the unit and rose through the ranks from junior pilot to assistant squadron navigator. Just a month before the German invasion of the Soviet Union, he became a flight commander in the 241st Attack Aviation Regiment.

== World War II ==
From the first month of the German–Soviet war, Bondarenko was an active participant. He made fifteen sorties on the I-153 during the defense of the Baltics before being sent to Voronezh, having gotten a concussion 4 July 1941 when he was forced to make an emergency landing at night after being shot down. Once he was released from the hospital, he began training to fly the new Ilyushin Il-2, a ground-attack plane. As one of the first pilots trained to fly it, he was assigned as a flight commander to 198th Attack Aviation Regiment, where he was soon promoted squadron commander. On 4 October 1941 he flew two very successful missions; on the first mission he took out eight tanks and six vehicles, and after returning to base to stock ammunition he went on to take out at least ten more tanks and dozens of enemy soldiers. The day after that he flew in an attack on a tank column that destroyed eight tanks, more than a dozen cars, and killed over 100 Axis soldiers. He quickly tallied 33 combat sorties on the Il-2 and was nominated first for the title Hero of the Soviet Union on 29 October 1941, but the nomination did not go through. During those missions he was credited with taking out a total of 30 tanks, 65 trucks, and 750 enemy personnel. During an engagement on 31 March 1942 his plane was attacked by German fighters, giving him a concussion and wounding his leg; but despite having been shot down eleven times from when he retrained to April 1942, he managed to return to his airbase after each attack. As a squadron commander he was nominated for the title Hero of the Soviet Union on 16 April 1942 for his first 63 missions, of which 48 were on the Il-2. He was awarded his first gold star on 6 June 1942. He was nominated for the title again in autumn and awarded a second gold star on 24 August 1943; while his nomination was pending, he became a flight inspector for the 3rd Attack Aviation Corps. During a mission on 8 June 1943, Bondarenko and his gunner were shot down and badly injured after being attacked multiple times by enemy fighters. Despite heavy damage to the plane, he managed to make it to friendly territory. After he was awarded his second gold star on 24 August 1943, he was not permitted to fly combat missions, so in October he began studying at the Air Force Academy. In total he flew 79 sorties on the Il-2 and shot down one enemy plane. The lion's share of Bonadrenko's combat missions took place during the battles for Rzhev.

== Postwar ==
Bondarenko remained in the military after the war and attended the Air Force Academy in Monino, which he graduated from in early 1947. He was then placed in command of the 103rd Attack Aviation Regiment, which used the Il-2. He was not in command of the unit for very long because he died of drowning in Olawa, Poland while swimming in the Oder river on 27 July 1947 and was buried in his home village of Bogdanovka.

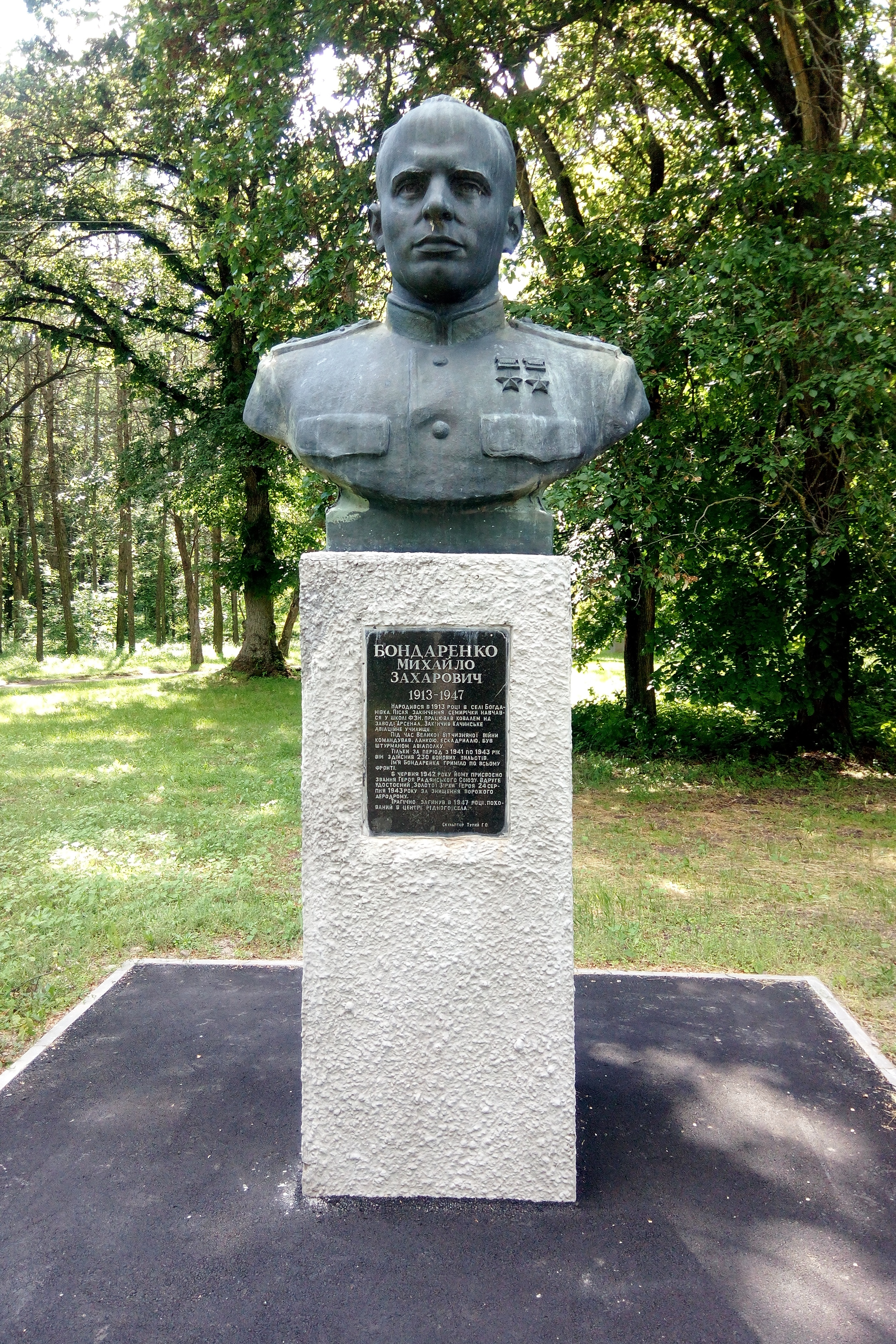
Bust of Mikhail Bondarenko in Yahotin

== Awards ==
- Twice Hero of the Soviet Union (6 June 1942 and 24 August 1943)
- Two Order of Lenin (5 December 1941 and 6 June 1942)
- Two Order of the Red Banner (6 November 1941 and 23 September 1942)
- Medal "For Battle Merit" (5 November 1946)

== Memorials ==
A bronze bust of Bondarenko was made by sculptor Dmitry Shvarts. Another bust of him, made by sculptor G.O. Tulin, was installed in Yahotyn, Ukraine.
