= List of Heroes of the Soviet Union (G) =

The Hero of the Soviet Union was the highest distinction of the Soviet Union. It was awarded 12,775 times. Due to the large size of the list, it has been broken up into multiple pages.

- Gennady Gabaidulin
- Bari Gabdrakhmanov (ru)
- Fazulla Gabdrashitov (ru)
- Malik Gabdullin
- Varlam Gabliya (ru)
- Yevgeny Gabov (ru)
- Nikolai Gabov (ru)
- Grigory Gabriadze (ru)
- Aleksey Gabrusev (ru)
- Ivan Gavva (ru)
- Vladimir Gavrikov (ru)
- Aleksandr Gavrilenko (ru)
- Leonty Gavrilenko (ru)
- Nikolai Gavrilin (ru)
- Pavel Gavrilin (ru)
- Akim Gavrilov (ru)
- Viktor Gavrilov (ru)
- Vladimir Nikolaevich Gavrilov (ru)
- Vladimir Yakovlevich Gavrilov (ru)
- Ivan Vasilievich Gavrilov (ru)
- Ivan Samsonovich Gavrilov (ru)
- Kumza Gavrilov (ru)
- Mikhail Gavrilov (ru)
- Nikolai Gavrilov (ru)
- Pyotr Ivanovich Gavrilov (pilot) (ru)
- Pyotr Ivanovich Gavrilov (infantry) (ru)
- Pyotr Mikhailovich Gavrilov
- Pyotr Filippovich Gavrilov (ru)
- Timofey Kuzmich Gavrilov (ru)
- Fyodor Gavrilovich Gavrilov (ru)
- Ivan Ivanovich Gavrish (ru)
- Ivan Fomich Gavrish (ru)
- Pavel Gavrish (ru)
- Nikolai Gavrishko (ru)
- Ivan Gavrysh (ru)
- Aleksey Gaganov (ru)
- Pyotr Gagarin (ru)
- Yegor Gagarin (ru)
- Yuri Gagarin
- Aleksandr Gagiev (ru)
- Alikhan Gagkaev (ru)
- Hamit Gadelshin (ru)
- Magomet Gadzhiyev
- Ibrahim Gazizullin (ru)
- Vasily Gazin (ru)
- Ivan Gayvoronsky (ru)
- Stepan Gaidarenko (ru)
- Aleksandr Gaidash (ru)
- Vladimir Gaidukov (ru)
- Semyon Gaidukov (ru)
- Ivan Gaydym (ru)
- Andrey Gaiko (ru)
- Ivan Gainulin (ru)
- Vyacheslav Gainutdinov (ru)
- Makhmetin Gainutdinov (ru)
- Ahmesafa Gaisin (ru)
- Khasan Gaisin (ru)
- Abdrakhman Gaifullin (ru)
- Mikhail Gakkel (ru)
- Gennady Galanov (ru)
- Aleksandr Galatov (ru)
- Vasily Galakhov (ru)
- Fakhrazi Galeev (ru)
- Aleksandr Galetsky (ru)
- Anatoly Galetsky (ru)
- Pyotr Galetsky (ru)
- Nikolai Galibin (ru)
- Nurgali Galiev (ru)
- Salimzyan Galimzyanov (ru)
- Vakhit Galimov (ru)
- Mikhail Galin (ru)
- Pyotr Galin (ru)
- Boris Galitsky (ru)
- Ivan Galitsky (ru)
- Kumza Galitsky
- Nikolai Galitsky (ru)
- Viktor Galkin (ru)
- Vladimir Galkin (ru)
- Ivan Galkin (ru)
- Kumza Galkin (ru)
- Mikhail Vasilyevich Galkin (ru)
- Mikhail Petrovich Galkin (ru)
- Pavel Galkin
- Fyodor Galkin (ru)
- Mark Gallay (ru)
- Viktor Galochkin (ru)
- Aleksey Galugan (ru)
- Grigory Galuz (ru)
- Socrates Galustashvili (ru)
- Grigory Galutva (ru)
- Prokopy Galushin (ru)
- Boris Galushkin (ru)
- Vasily Galushkin (ru)
- Aleks Gal (ru)
- Anatoly Galperin (ru)
- Vladimir Galperin (ru)
- Ivan Galtsev (ru)
- Leonid Galchenko (ru)
- Nikolai Galchenko (ru)
- Pyotr Galyatkin (ru)
- Yefrom Gamankov (ru)
- Vasily Gamayun (ru)
- Magomed Gamzatov (ru)
- Vladimir Gamzin (ru)
- Dmitry Gamov (ru)
- Shota Gamtsemlidze (ru)
- Aleksey Gangaev (ru)
- Ivan Ganzhela (ru)
- Vladimir Ganushchenko (ru)
- Pyotr Ganyushin (ru)
- Nikolai Gapeyonok (ru)
- Grigory Gapon (ru)
- Daniil Gaponenko (ru)
- Grigory Gaponov (ru)
- Yefim Gaponov (ru)
- Mikhail Garam (ru)
- Aleksey Garanin (ru)
- Vladimir Garanin (ru)
- Aleksey Garant (ru)
- Yeverant Garanyan (ru)
- Ahmatger Gardapkhadze (ru)
- Grigory Gardemann (ru)
- Musa Gareyev (twice)
- Boris Garin (ru)
- Gabdulla Garifullin (ru)
- Kuzma Garkusha (ru)
- Nikolai Garkusha (ru)
- Fyodor Garkusha (ru)
- Yakov Garkusha (ru)
- Garmazhap Garmaev (ru)
- Mikhail Garmoza (ru)
- Yuri Garnaev
- Mikhail Garnizov (ru)
- Grigory Garfunkin (ru)
- Mikhail Gasnikov (ru)
- Vladimir Gasoyan (ru)
- Nikolai Gastello
- Anvar Gataullin (ru)
- Shakir Gatiatullin
- Gazzinur Gafiatullin (ru)
- Mikhail Gakhokidze (ru)
- Rufina Gasheva
- Aleksey Gashkov (ru)
- Vladimir Gvantseladze (ru)
- Ivan Gvencadze (ru)
- Aleksey Gvozdev (ru)
- Ivan Vladimirovich Gvozdev (ru)
- Grigory Gevrik (ru)
- Arkady Gegeshidze (ru)
- Boleslav Gegznas (ru)
- Ioseph Geibo (ru)
- Vasily Gelet (ru)
- Polina Gelman
- Semyon Gelferg (ru)
- Genrikh Gendreus (ru)
- Aleksey Generalov (ru)
- Yevgeny Generalov (ru)
- Yemelyan Gerasimenko (ru)
- Ivan Gerasimenko (ru)
- Mikhail Gerasimenko (ru)
- Prokopy Gerasimenko (ru)
- Vadim Gerasimov (ru)
- Vladimir Ivanovich Gerasimov (ru)
- Grigory Gerasimov (ru)
- Dmitry Gerasimov (ru)
- Ivan Aleksandrovich Gerasimov (ru)
- Ivan Nikolaievich Gerasimov (ru)
- Innokenty Gerasimov (ru)
- Mikhail Nikolaievich Gerasimov (ru)
- Nikolai Semyonovich Gerasimov (ru)
- Sergey Dmitrievich Gerasimov (ru)
- Filipp Gerasimov (ru)
- David Gerasimchuk (ru)
- Valentin Gerasin (ru)
- Aleksandr Geraskin (ru)
- Dmitry Geraskin
- Ivan Gerashchenko (ru)
- Michael Gerashchenko (ru)
- Pavel Gerbinsky (ru)
- Andrey Gergel (ru)
- Aleksandr Viktorovich German (ru)
- Aleksandr Mironovich German (ru)
- Grigory German (ru)
- Ivan Moiseevich German (ru)
- Ivan Germashev (ru)
- Pavel Gertman (ru)
- Grigory Ges
- Andrey Getman
- Ivan Getman (ru)
- Boris Getz (ru)
- Primo Gibelli
- Semyon Getman (ru)
- Shirvan Gizatov (ru)
- Minnulla Gizatulin (ru)
- Abdulla Gizatullin
- Hamazan Gizatullin
- Boris Gildunin (ru)
- Gayfutdin Gilmutdinov (ru)
- Tazetdin Gilyazetdinov
- Gabbas Giniyatullin
- Vitold Gintovt (ru)
- Dmitry Girin (ru)
- Mikhail Girin (ru)
- Andrey Girich
- Georgy Glavatsky (ru)
- Vasily Glagolev
- Aleksandr Gladkov
- Boris Gladkov (ru)
- Vasily Dmitrievich Gladkov (ru)
- Vasily Fyodorovich Gladkov (ru)
- Stefan Gladkov (ru)
- Fyodor Gladush (ru)
- Nikolai Gladyshev (ru)
- Vasily Glazkov (ru)
- Pavel Glazkov (ru)
- Yuri Glazkov
- Ivan Glazov (ru)
- Nikolai Glazov (ru)
- Vasily Glazunov (twice)
- Vladimir Glazunov (ru)
- Grigory Glazunov (ru)
- Pyotr Glazunov (ru)
- Nikolai Glazykin (ru)
- Yevgeny Glasko (ru)
- Viktor Glebov (ru)
- Georgy Glebov (ru)
- Leonid Glebov (ru)
- Mikhail Glebov (ru)
- Yuri Glybko (ru)
- Fyodor Glinin (ru)
- Boris Glinka
- Dmitry Glinka (twice)
- Sergey Glinkin
- Sergey Glinsky (ru)
- Nikolai Globin (ru)
- Nikolai Glotov (ru)
- Ivan Glukhikh (ru)
- Dmitry Glukhov (ru)
- Ivan Glukhov (ru)
- Fyodor Glukhov (ru)
- Mikhail Glushko (ru)
- Ivan Glushkov (ru)
- Nikolai Glushkov (ru)
- Leonty Glushchenko (ru)
- Grigory Glyga (ru)
- Valeriya Gnarovskaya
- Grigory Gmatemko (ru)
- Viktor Gnedin (ru)
- Aleksandr Gnedoy (ru)
- Ivan Gnezdilov
- Aleksey Gnechko (ru)
- Pyotr Gnida
- Kuzma Gnidash
- Pyotr Gnido
- Nina Gnilitskaya
- Ivan Gnilomedov (ru)
- Aleksandr Gnusarev (ru)
- Aleksandr Gnusin (ru)
- Panteleimon Gnuchy (ru)
- Vladimir Govorov
- Leonid Govorov
- Mikhail Govorov (ru)
- Sergey Govorov (ru)
- Fyodor Govorov (ru)
- Pyotr Govorunenko (ru)
- Nikolai Govorunov (ru)
- Ivan Govorukhin (ru)
- Lev Govorukhin (ru)
- Nikolai Gogichaishvili (ru)
- Viktor Gogolev (ru)
- Grigory Godin (ru)
- Aleksey Godovikov (ru)
- Sergey Godovikov (ru)
- Filipp Gokov (ru)
- Nikolai Goldobin (ru)
- Leonid Golev (ru)
- Stepan Golenev (ru)
- Grigory Golikov (ru)
- Leonid Golikov
- Aleksey Golimbievsky (ru)
- Anatoly Golitsin (ru)
- Pyotr Golichenkov (ru)
- Grigory Golishchikhin (ru)
- Aleksandr Golovanov (ru)
- Vasily Golovan (ru)
- Yuri Golovaty (ru)
- Aleksandr Golovatyuk (ru)
- Yakov Golovach (ru)
- Aleksandr Golovachev (twice)
- Pavel Golovachev (twice)
- Semyon Golovachev (ru)
- Sergey Golovashenko (ru)
- Fyodor Golovashko (ru)
- Aleksey Golovin (ru)
- Vasily Golovin (ru)
- Grigory Golovin (ru)
- Ivan Golovin (ru)
- Pavel Golovin
- Gai Golovinsky (ru)
- Aleksey Golovkin (ru)
- Vasily Golovkin (ru)
- Pavel Golovkin (ru)
- Pavel Andreyevich Golovko (ru)
- Pavel Fedotovich Golovko (ru)
- Georgy Golovkov (ru)
- Aleksey Golovlyov (ru)
- Leonid Golovlyov (ru)
- Aleksandr Golovnenkov (ru)
- Aleksandr Golovnya (ru)
- Anatoly Golovchenko (ru)
- Vasily Yevstafevich Golovchenko (ru)
- Vasily Ivanovich Golovchenko (ru)
- Vladimir Golovchenko (ru)
- Aleksey Golodnov (ru)
- Pyotr Golodnyak (ru)
- Anisim Golosko (ru)
- Vladimir Goloskokov (ru)
- Vasily Golosov (ru)
- Dmitry Golosov (ru)
- Rudolf Golosov
- Vasily Goloulin (ru)
- Aleksey Goloshchapov (ru)
- Ivan Golub (ru)
- Semyon Golub (ru)
- Aleksandr Golubev (ru)
- Vasily Golubev (ru)
- Viktor Golubev (twice)
- Georgy Golubev (ru)
- Dmitry Golubev (ru)
- Leonid Golubev (ru)
- Mikhail Golubev (ru)
- Sergey Golubev (ru)
- Aleksey Golubenko (ru)
- Ivan Golubets
- Ivan Golubin (ru)
- Aleksey Golubkov (ru)
- Vsevold Golubkov (ru)
- Nikolai Golubkov (ru)
- Ivan Golubnichy (ru)
- Anatoly Golubov (ru)
- Aleksey Golubovsky (ru)
- Boris Golubovsky (ru)
- Grigory Golubovsky (ru)
- Aleksandr Goluboy (ru)
- Sergey Golukovich (ru)
- Ivan Golchin (ru)
- Mikhail Golyakov (ru)
- Leonid Golyachkov (ru)
- Ivan Gomankov (ru)
- Viktor Gomzin (ru)
- Nikita Gomonenko (ru)
- Konstantin Gontar (ru)
- Ivan Gonchar (ru)
- Pavel Gonchar (ru)
- Vladislav Goncharenko (ru)
- Nikolai Goncharenko (ru)
- Oleg Goncharenko (ru)
- Ivan Timofeevich Goncharov (ensign) (ru)
- Ivan Timofeevich Goncharov (captain) (ru)
- Leonid Goncharov (ru)
- Nikolai Andreevich Goncharov (ru)
- Nikolai Artemovich Goncharov (ru)
- Pyotr Alekseevich Goncharov (ru)
- Pyotr Ivanovich Goncharov (ru)
- Pyotr Frolovich Goncharov (ru)
- Semyon Goncharov (ru)
- Yakov Goncharov (ru)
- Vladimir Goncharuk (ru)
- Fyodor Goncharuk (ru)
- Grigory Gonchar (ru)
- Vladimir Gopnik (ru)
- Pyotr Gora
- Volkan Goranov
- Nikolai Gorbanev (ru)
- Vasily Gorban (ru)
- Ignat Gorban (ru)
- Nikolai Gorbatenko (ru)
- Viktor Gorbatko (twice)
- Aleksandr Gorbatov
- Yevgeny Gorbatyuk (ru)
- Maksim Gorbach (ru)
- Mikhail Gorbach (ru)
- Feodosy Gorbach (ru)
- Afansy Gorbachev (ru)
- Veniamin Gorbachev (ru)
- Dmitry Gorbachev (ru)
- Ivan Gorbachev (ru)
- Mikhail Gorbachev (ru)
- Aleksandr Gorbachevsky (ru)
- Ivan Gorbenko (ru)
- Yuri Gorbko (ru)
- Grigory Gorbunkov (ru)
- Aleksandr Gorbunov (ru)
- Andrey Gorbunov (ru)
- Vladimir Gorbunov (ru)
- Dmitry Gorbunov (ru)
- Ivan Gorbunov
- Ilya Gorbunov (ru)
- Nikolai Gorbunov (ru)
- Stepan Gorbunov (ru)
- Fyodor Gorbunov (ru)
- Yuri Gorbushko (ru)
- Aleksandr Gorgolyuk
- Aleksandr Gordeyev (ru)
- Vladimir Gordeyev (ru)
- Narkis Gordeyev (ru)
- Vladimir Gordienko (ru)
- Ivan Gordienko (ru)
- Pyotr Gordienko (ru)
- Vasily Gordov
- Gennady Gordopolov (ru)
- Aleksey Gorev (ru)
- Leonid Goreglyad (ru)
- Vladimir Goreglyadov (ru)
- Filipp Gorelenko
- Aleksey Gorelenkov (ru)
- Yevgeny Gorelik (ru)
- Zinovy Gorelik (ru)
- Solomon Gorelik (ru)
- Ivan Gorelikov (ru)
- Aleksandr Gorelov (ru)
- Vasily Gorelov (ru)
- Vladimir Mikhailovich Gorelov (ru)
- Vladimir Petrovich Gorelov (ru)
- Ivan Gorelov (ru)
- Pyotr Gorelov (ru)
- Sergey Gorelov (ru)
- Feodosy Gorenchuk (ru)
- Anatoly Gorin (ru)
- Vasily Gorin (ru)
- Nikolai Gorin (ru)
- Vasily Gorishny (ru)
- Dmitry Gorishny (ru)
- Mikhail Gorkunov (ru)
- Timofey Gornov (ru)
- Aleksey Gorobets (ru)
- Stepan Gorobets (ru)
- Taras Gorobets (ru)
- Aleksandr Gorovets
- Vasily Gorovoy (ru)
- Vladimir Gorovoy (ru)
- Vasily Gorodetsky (ru)
- Nikolai Gorodnichev (ru)
- Basan Gorodovikov (ru)
- Oka Gorodovikov
- Gennady Gorokhov (ru)
- Yuri Gorokhov (ru)
- Pavel Goroshek (ru)
- Yaroslav Goroshko (ru)
- Mikhail Gorsky (ru)
- Ivan Gorchakov (ru)
- Pyotr Gorchakov (ru)
- Aleksandr Gorchilin (ru)
- Vasily Gorshkov (ru)
- Yegor Gorshkov (ru)
- Ivan Gorshkov (ru)
- Sergey Georgievich Gorshkov (twice)
- Sergey Ilyich Gorshkov (ru)
- Nikolai Gorkov (ru)
- Nikolai Goryunov (ru)
- Sergey Goryunov (ru)
- Nikolai Goryushkin (twice)
- Nikolai Goryainov (ru)
- Viktor Goryachev (ru)
- Vladimir Goryachev (ru)
- Ivan Goryachev (ru)
- Nikolai Goryachev (ru)
- Pavel Goryachev (ru)
- Timofey Goryachkin (ru)
- Aleksandr Gostev (ru)
- Pyotr Gostishchev (ru)
- Emmanuil Gotlib (ru)
- Genrikh Gofman (ru)
- Georgy Gotsiridze (ru)
- Maksim Grabovenko
- Mikhail Grabsky
- Andrey Grabchak (ru)
- Maksim Grabchuk (ru)
- Pavel Grazhdaninov (ru)
- Viktor Grazhdankin (ru)
- Ivan Grankin (ru)
- Pavel Grankin (ru)
- Vladimir Gountov (ru)
- Igor Gountov (ru)
- Aleksey Graziansky (ru)
- Akim Grachev (ru)
- Aleksey Grachev (ru)
- Anatoly Grachev (ru)
- Viktor Grachev (ru)
- Ivan Nikolaevich Grachev (ru)
- Ivan Petrovich Grachev (ru)
- Pavel Grachev
- Arkady Dmitrievich Grebenev (ru)
- Arkady Filimonovich Grebenev (ru)
- Kumza Grebennik
- Boris Grebennikov (ru)
- Sergey Grebensky (ru)
- Yevtei Grebenyuk (ru)
- Nikita Grebenyuk (ru)
- Andrey Grebnev (ru)
- Sergey Grebchenko (ru)
- Pyotr Greedin (ru)
- Ivan Grek (ru)
- Leonid Grekov (ru)
- Nikolai Grekov (ru)
- Pyotr Grekov (ru)
- Ilya Grel (ru)
- Mikhail Grekhov (ru)
- Vladimir Gretsky (ru)
- Pyotr Gretsky (ru)
- Parfenty Grepyany (ru)
- Pyotr Grechenkov (ru)
- Nikita Grechikhin (ru)
- Vasily Konstantinovich Grechishkin (ru)
- Vasily Nikolaevich Grechishkin (ru)
- Vasily Grecheshnikov (ru)
- Andrey Grechko (twice)
- Georgy Grechko (twice)
- Dmitry Grechushkin (ru)
- Mikhail Greshilov (ru)
- Aleksey Grib (ru)
- Andrey Grib (ru)
- Ivan Grib (ru)
- Kumza Grib (ru)
- Mikhail Grib (ru)
- Nikolai Gribanov (ru)
- Nikolai Gribkov (ru)
- Pyotr Gribov (ru)
- Pyotr Gribolev (ru)
- Aleksandr Grivtsov (ru)
- Nikolai Grigorevsky (ru)
- Mikhail Grigorenko (ru)
- Ivan Grigorov (ru)
- Mikhail Grigorov (ru)
- Leonid Grigorovich (ru)
- Mikhail Grigorovich (ru)
- Aleksandr Grigorievich Grigoriev (ru)
- Aleksandr Ivanovich Grigoriev (ru)
- Aleksey Grigoriev (ru)
- Viktor Grigoriev (ru)
- Georgy Grigoriev (ru)
- Gerasim Grigoriev (ru)
- Grigory Grigoriev (ru)
- Dmitry Grigoriev (ru)
- Ivan Andreevich Grigoriev (ru)
- Ivan Ivanovich Grigoriev (ru)
- Ivan Yakovlevich Grigoriev (tanker) (ru)
- Ivan Yakovlevich Grigoriev (infantry) (ru)
- Ilya Grigoriev (ru)
- Leonid Grigoriev (ru)
- Nikolai Vasilievich Grigoriev (ru)
- Nikolai Ivanovich Grigoriev (ru)
- Nikolai Mikhailovich Grigoriev (ru)
- Pavel Grigoriev (ru)
- Sergey Grigoriev (ru)
- Foma Grigoriev (ru)
- Ivan Grigoryevsky (ru)
- Sergey Grigoryan (ru)
- Grigory Gridasov (ru)
- Dmitry Gridasov (ru)
- Veniamin Gridin (ru)
- Dmitry Gridin (ru)
- Aleksandr Gridinsky (ru)
- Valentina Grizodubova
- Mikhail Grinev (ru)
- Nikolai Grinev (ru)
- Maksim Grinenko (ru)
- Valery Grinchak (ru)
- Ivan Grinko (ru)
- Anton Grisyuk (ru)
- Sergey Gritsevets (twice)
- Yefim Gritsenko (ru)
- Ignat Gritsenko (ru)
- Mikhail Gritsenko (ru)
- Pyotr Gritsenko (ru)
- Vladimir Gritskov (ru)
- Ivan Gritsov (ru)
- Konstantin Gritsynin
- Viktor Grishaev (ru)
- Ivan Grishaev (ru)
- Aleksandr Grishin (ru)
- Aleksey Grishin (ru)
- Ivan Aleksandrovich Grishin (ru)
- Ivan Grigorievich Grishin (ru)
- Ivan Tikhonovich Grishin
- Ivan Trifonovich Grishin (ru)
- Sergey Grishin
- Valentin Grishko (ru)
- Kirill Grishko (ru)
- Pavel Grishko (ru)
- Mikhail Grishonkov (ru)
- Yegor Grishunov (ru)
- Mikhail Grishchenko (ru)
- Nikolai Grishchenko (ru)
- Pavel Grishchenko (ru)
- Pyotr Grishchenko (ru)
- Anatoly Grobov (ru)
- Vasily Gromakov (ru)
- Vladimir Gromakovsky (ru)
- Grigory Gromnitsky (ru)
- Aleksandr Gromov (ru)
- Aleksey Gromov (ru)
- Boris Gromov
- Georgy Gromov (ru)
- Ivan Ivanovich Gromov (ru)
- Ivan Petrovich Gromov (ru)
- Konstantin Gromov (ru)
- Mikhail Gromov
- Pantelei Gromov (ru)
- Juliana Gromova
- Nikolai Gromykhalin (ru)
- Ivan Grosul (ru)
- Anatoly Groshev (ru)
- Dmitry Groshev (ru)
- Leonid Groshev (ru)
- Nikolai Groshev (ru)
- Pyotr Groshenkov (ru)
- Vasily Grudinin (ru)
- Vasily Gruzdev (ru)
- Iona Gruzdev (ru)
- Aleksandr Gruzdin (ru)
- Bronislav Gruzevich (ru)
- Pyotr Grustnev (ru)
- Nikolai Grukhin (ru)
- Vasily Grushko (ru)
- Aleksandr Gryazanov (ru)
- Andrey Gryazanov (ru)
- Vikenty Gryazanov (ru)
- Vladimir Gryazanov (ru)
- Kirill Gryazanov (ru)
- Vasily Guba (ru)
- Daniil Guba (ru)
- Minnigali Gubaidullin
- Aleksey Gubanov
- Georgy Gubanov (ru)
- Ivan Gubanov (ru)
- Maksim Gubanov (ru)
- Nikolai Gubanov (ru)
- Aleksey Gubarev (twice)
- Grigory Gubarev (ru)
- Pyotr Gubarev (ru)
- Aleksandr Gubar (ru)
- Grigory Gubarky (ru)
- Vladimir Gubeladze (ru)
- Anton Gubenko (ru)
- Andrian Gubin (ru)
- Yevgeny Gubin (ru)
- Konstantin Gubin (ru)
- Mikhail Gubin (ru)
- Nazar Gubin (ru)
- Nikolai Gubin (ru)
- Georgy Gubkin (ru)
- Aleksey Gubri (ru)
- Nikolai Gugnin (ru)
- Aleksandr Gudanov (ru)
- Yevgeny Gudanov (ru)
- Mikhail Gudenko (ru)
- Pavel Gudenko (ru)
- Sergey Gudenko (ru)
- Porfiry Gudz (ru)
- Ivan Vasilievich Gudimov (ru)
- Ivan Kirillovich Gudimov (ru)
- Dmitry Gudkov (ru)
- Oleg Gudkov (ru)
- Ivan Gudovsky (ru)
- Nikolai Guzhva (ru)
- Pyotr Guzhvin (ru)
- Mark Guz (ru)
- Gennady Guzanov (ru)
- Ivan Guzenkov (ru)
- Nikolai Gulayev (twice)
- Kirill Gulevaty (ru)
- Trofim Gulevaty (ru)
- Ilya Gulenko (ru)
- Nikolai Gulimov (ru)
- Yuri Gulin (ru)
- Ivan Gulkin (ru)
- Abbas Guliyev
- Adil Guliyev
- Mehdi Guliyev
- Grigory Gultyaev (ru)
- Anatoly Gulyaev (ru)
- Dmitry Illarionovich Gulyaev (ru)
- Dmitry Timofeyevich Gulyaev (ru)
- Ivan Gulyaev (ru)
- Nikolai Gulyaev (ru)
- Sergey Arsentyevich Gulyaev (ru)
- Sergey Konstantinovich Gulyaev (ru)
- Vladimir Gumanenko (ru)
- Semyon Gumenyuk (ru)
- Nikolai Gunbin (ru)
- Semyon Gurvich (ru)
- Aleksandr Gurgenidze (ru)
- Mikhail Gurevich (ru)
- Semyon Gurevich (ru)
- Mikhail Gureyev (ru)
- Sergey Gureyev (ru)
- Dmitry Gurenko (ru)
- Kumza Gurenko (ru)
- Anton Gurin (ru)
- Vasily Gurin (ru)
- Nikita Gurinenko (ru)
- Ivan Gurov (ru)
- Konstantin Gurov (ru)
- Nikolai Gurov (ru)
- Yuri Gurov (ru)
- Jügderdemidiin Gürragchaa
- Nikolai Gursky (ru)
- Leonty Gurtyev
- Grigory Guryev (ru)
- Mikhail Guryev (ru)
- Pavel Guryev (ru)
- Stepan Guryev
- Grigory Guryanov (ru)
- Mikhail Guryanov (ru)
- Pavel Guryanov (ru)
- Aleksey Gusakov (ru)
- Pyotr Gusakov (ru)
- Iosif Gusakovsky
- Grigory Gusarov (ru)
- Nikolai Gusarov
- Aleksandr Ivanovich Gusev (pilot) (ru)
- Aleksandr Ivanovich Gusev (gunner) (ru)
- Aleksandr Fyodorovich Gusev (ru)
- Aleksey Gusev (ru)
- Vasily Vasilievich Gusev (ru)
- Vasily Sergeyevich Gusev (ru)
- Veniamin Gusev (ru)
- Vladimir Gusev (ru)
- Dmitry Nikolaevich Gusev (ru)
- Dmitry Sergeyevich Gusev
- Ivan Alekseyevich Gusev (ru)
- Ivan Andreyevich Gusev (ru)
- Ivan Mikhailovich Gusev (ru)
- Ivan Petrovich Gusev (ru)
- Maksim Gusev (ru)
- Nikolai Prokhorovich Gusev (ru)
- Nikolai Fyodorovich Gusev (ru)
- Sergey Gusev (ru)
- Denis Guselnikov (ru)
- Pavel Gusenko (ru)
- Georgy Guslev (ru)
- Aleksey Gusko (ru)
- Gavriil Guskov (ru)
- Vasily Gutin (ru)
- Anatoly Gutman (ru)
- Iosif Gutnik (ru)
- Mikhail Gutorov (ru)
- Aleksandr Gutsalo (ru)
- Pyotr Gyuchek (ru)
- Boris Gushchin (ru)
- Vladimir Gushchin (ru)
- Nikolai Gushchin (ru)
- Pavel Gushchin (ru)
- Sergey Gushchin (ru)
- Fyodor Gushchin (ru)
