= Gusarov =

Gusarov (Russian: Гусаров) is a Russian masculine surname, its feminine counterpart is Gusarova. It may refer to

- Alexei Gusarov (born 1964), Russian ice hockey defender
- Gennadi Gusarov (1937–2014), Russian football player
- Nikolai Gusarov (1905–1985), Soviet statesman
- Nikolay Mikhailovich Gusarov (1917–1979), Soviet military officer
