= Korobkov =

Korobkov or Korobkow (Russian: Коробков from коробка, meaning box) is a Russian surname. Its feminine counterpart is Korobkova or Korobkowa. It may refer to:

- Aleksandr Korobkov (1897–1941), Soviet general
- Pavel Korobkov (born 1990), Russian basketballer
- Pavel Terentyevich Korobkov (1909–1978), Soviet flying ace
- Nina Korobkova (born 1926), Russian rower

== See also ==
- Korobkova House
