= 486th Fighter Aviation Regiment =

12th Fighter Aviation Regiment (May 1938 – 26 Dec 1941) 486th Fighter Aviation Regiment (26 Dec 1941 – 7 Sep 1960)
- Active: 1938–1960
- Country: Soviet Union
- Branch: Soviet Air Force
- Type: Aviation Regiment
- Size: Regiment
- Engagements: Soviet invasion of Poland World War II: Crimean Campaign; Battle of Kursk; Operation Bagration; Vienna Offensive
- Decorations: Order of Suvorov 3rd class Order of Bogdan Khmelnitsky 2nd class

Commanders
- Notable commanders: Dmitry Alexandrovich Medvedev

Aircraft flown
- Lavochkin La-7 MiG-17

The 486th Fighter Aviation Regiment was a fighter regiment (IAP) of the Soviet Air Force. It was formed in 1938 as the 12th Fighter Aviation Regiment and disbanded in 1960. The regiment was awarded the Order of Suvorov 3rd class and the Order of Bogdan Khmelnitsky. It fought in the Soviet invasion of Poland, Crimean Campaign, Battle of Kursk, Operation Bagration and the Vienna Offensive. Regimental personnel included flying aces and Heroes of the Soviet Union Pavel Terentyevich Korobkov, Dmitry Alexandrovich Medvedev, Nikolay Mikhailovich Gusarov and Andrei Girich. Throughout its career, the regiment operated the Polikarpov I-15, Lavochkin-Gorbunov-Gudkov LaGG-3, Lavochkin La-7, Mikoyan-Gurevich MiG-15 and Mikoyan-Gurevich MiG-17, among other aircraft.

== History ==
The regiment was first formed in May 1938 as the 12th Fighter Aviation Regiment, part of the 69th Fighter Aviation Brigade, in the Kiev Military District at Kirovohrad airfield from the 16th Separate Fighter Squadron. It was initially equipped with the Polikarpov I-16 and Polikarpov I-15bis. It fought in the Soviet invasion of Poland, where it shot down one Polish aircraft. In April 1940, Captain Pavel Terentyevich Korobkov, a Hero of the Soviet Union and Spanish Civil War flying ace, became the regiment's commander. In June, the regiment provided air cover for the Soviet occupation of Bessarabia. On 14 July, the regiment was transferred to the 15th Mixed Aviation Division. It became part of the 64th Fighter Aviation Division on 5 January 1941. On 22 June, Lieutenant Leonid Grigoryevich Butelin shot down one Junkers Ju 88 and rammed another over Ivano-Frankivsk Airfield while flying an I-153, the regiment's first kills of the war. Butelin was killed in the taran, for which he was posthumously awarded the Order of the Red Banner. The regiment fought in the Battle of Kiev and was sent to the rear for resupply. It was transferred to the 11th Reserve Fighter Aviation Regiment and was reequipped with the more modern LaGG-3 fighters at Rostov-on-Don in October. German advances forced the regiment to withdraw to Kirovabad in Azerbaijan SSR to continue training in November. After finishing reequipping, the regiment was sent to the Crimean Front as part of the 72nd Fighter Aviation Division and fought in the Defense of Sevastopol. On 26 December, the regiment was renamed as the 486th Fighter Aviation Regiment. Throughout its roughly six months of combat, the 12th IAP had made 2607 sorties, shot down 75 aircraft and destroyed a total of 97 aircraft. It had lost 61 aircraft and had ten pilots killed. The 486th continued to fly missions over Crimea until April. Korobkov was promoted to command the 16th Impact Aviation Group. The regiment's new commander was Captain I.A. Garkushka. It was subordinated to the 4th Replacement Fighter Aviation Regiment and relocated to Morshansk to receive reinforcements. In August, the regiment was sent to Noginsk and equipped with slightly improved LaGG-3 Series 37 fighters. The regiment transferred to Migalovo airfield in October and became part of the 106th Fighter Aviation Division Air Defense, providing air cover for Moscow. In January 1943, the regiment was transferred to Volodarsk and reequipped with the new Lavochkin La-5 as part of the 2nd Replacement Fighter Aviation Regiment.

It was part of the 279th Fighter Aviation Division from May 1943 onwards. In June, the regiment's commander became Captain Nikolay Mikhailovich Gusarov. During the summer, the regiment fought in the Battle of Kursk, Operation Kutuzov and the Chernigov-Pripyat Offensive. In September, Major Denis Pelipets became the regimental commander. In December, the regiment was sent to the rear for resupply. In May 1944, the regiment was relocated to Oryol. From June to August, it fought in Operation Bagration, the Bobruysk Offensive, the Minsk Offensive and the Lublin–Brest Offensive. During Operation Bagration, Major Pelipets was killed in action on 5 July and the regimental commander became Major Dmitry Alexandrovich Medvedev. In August, the 279th IAD was transferred to the 5th Air Army and the regiment fought in the Second Jassy–Kishinev Offensive, the Belgrade Offensive, the Battle of Debrecen and the Budapest Offensive. It was withdrawn from combat in December and equipped with the Lavochkin La-7.

The regiment had returned to combat by March 1945 and fought in the repulse of Operation Spring Awakening. It then fought in the Vienna Offensive, Bratislava–Brno Offensive and the Prague Offensive. After the end of the war, the regiment was based at Ringelsdorf. On 4 June, it was awarded the Order of Suvorov, 3rd class for its actions during the Prague Offensive. On the same day, it was also awarded the Order of Bogdan Khmelnitsky, 2nd class for its actions during the Vienna Offensive. During its combat service in World War II, the 486th IAP had made 5,739 sorties, shot down 167 and destroyed a total of 167 aircraft. It had lost 70 aircraft and 42 pilots killed.

On 28 August, it was relocated to Lutsk in Western Ukraine. It moved to Ivano-Frankivsk on 15 October 1948, where it remained until October 1951. In 1951 it transferred to Mukacheve and was reequipped with the Mikoyan-Gurevich MiG-15, the regiment's first jet aircraft. Future cosmonaut Vladimir Komarov served as a pilot with the regiment between 1952 and 1954. In 1954, it was equipped with the MiG-17 jet fighters. It was disbanded on 7 September 1960.

== Aircraft operated ==
Aircraft operated by 486th IAP, data from
From	To	Aircraft	Version
May 1938	1942	Polikarpov I-15	I-15bis
May 1938	1942	Polikarpov I-16	
June 1940	1941	Polikarpov I-153	
January 1942	1943	Lavochkin-Gorbunov-Gudkov LaGG-3	
January 1943	1945	Lavochkin La-5	
December 1944	1951	Lavochkin La-7	
March 1951	1954	Mikoyan-Gurevich MiG-15	
1954	1960	Mikoyan-Gurevich MiG-17	

== Commanders ==
The following officers commanded the regiment:

- Captain (promoted to Major) Pavel Terentyevich Korobkov (April 1940 – April 1942)
- Captain I.A. Garkusha (April–June 1942)
- Captain Nikolay Mikhailovich Gusarov (June–September 1942)
- Major Denis Pelipets (September 1942 – 5 July 1943) KIA
- Major (promoted to Lieutenant Colonel) Dmitry Alexandrovich Medvedev (16 July 1943 – 11 May 1945)
