= Aeroflot Flight 6833 =

1983 aircraft hijacking

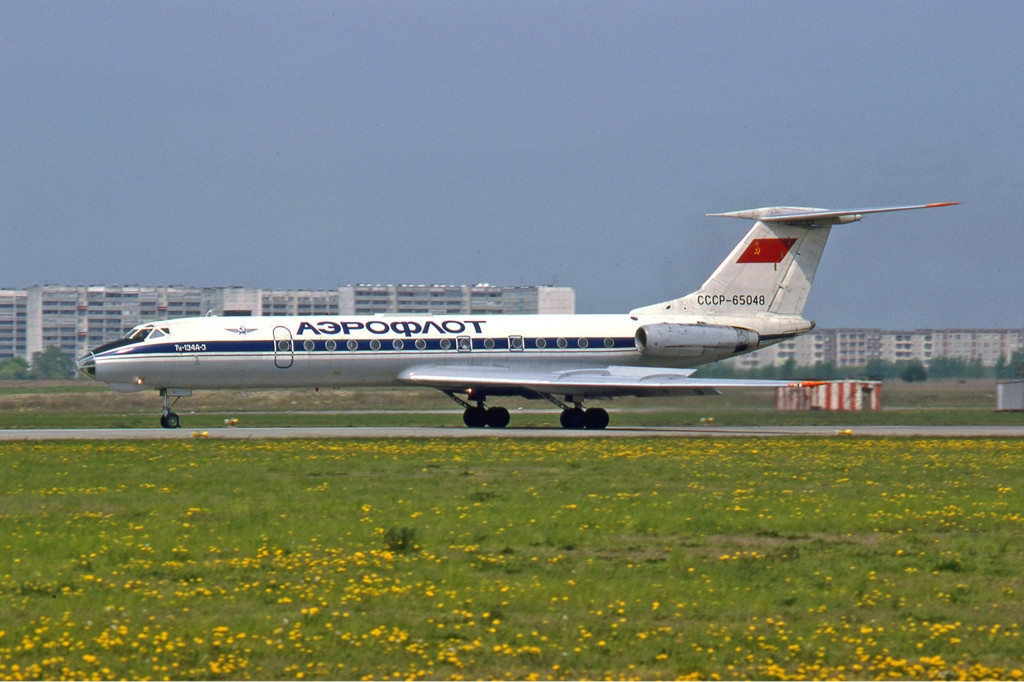
- A Tupolev Tu-134 aircraft similar to the aircraft involved in the incident.

Hijacking
- Date: 18 November 1983
- Summary: Hijacking
- Site: En route from Tbilisi, Georgian SSR, Soviet Union to Leningrad, Russian SFSR, Soviet Union; 41°40′8.82″N 44°57′17.96″E

Aircraft
- Aircraft type: Tupolev Tu-134A
- Operator: Aeroflot
- Registration: CCCP-65807
- Flight origin: Tbilisi-Novo Alexeyevka Airport (TBS / UGGG)
- Destination: Leningrad-Pulkovo Airport (LED / ULLI)
- Passengers: 57
- Crew: 7
- Fatalities: 8
- Survivors: 56

Aeroflot Flight 6833, en route from Tbilisi, Georgian SSR, to Leningrad, Russian SFSR, with an intermediate stop in Batumi, was the scene of an attempted aircraft hijacking by seven young Georgians on 18–19 November 1983. The crisis ended with a storming of the Tu-134A airliner by Alpha Group that resulted in eight dead. The surviving hijackers were subsequently tried and executed.

== Incident ==
On 18 November 1983 seven young people, all sons of Georgian intellectual elite families, attempted to flee the Soviet Union by hijacking an airliner of the state-run Aeroflot company. Among the hijackers were the painters Gia Tabidze, Davit Mikaberidze, and Soso Tsereteli, the actor Gega Kobakhidze (who had just been selected to play a role in Tengiz Abuladze's subsequently famous film Repentance), and the physicians Paata and Kakhi Iverieli. They pretended to be a wedding party, boarded the airliner in Tbilisi, and tried to divert it to Turkey. There were 57 passengers and seven crew members on board.

The captain, Akhmatger Gardapkhadze, and the co-pilot, Vladimir Gasoyan (both of them were subsequently awarded the titles of the Hero of the Soviet Union) made sharp maneuvers to prevent the hijackers from taking aim. The hijackers were forced out of the flight deck but several people were injured in a clash. Rather than concede to the hijackers' demands, the pilot circled Tbilisi and later landed.

The Georgian Communist Party chief, Eduard Shevardnadze, called for the deployment of an elite Soviet special unit Alpha Group from Moscow. On day two of the hijacking the Alpha group stormed the aircraft and arrested the surviving hijackers. The incident claimed the lives of three crew members, two passengers and three hijackers. The aircraft received 108 bullet holes during the attack, and because its structure was weakened by the maneuvers that exceeded its design limits, the aircraft was written off.

== Trial and aftermath ==
The arrested hijackers as well as their friend and confessor Orthodox priest Theodore Chikhladze were tried by the Soviet Georgian court. The convicts declared that they wanted to "have a better life and live in a free society." Shevardnadze described them as "drug addicts" and "bandits", and demanded the death penalty. In August 1984, the three hijackers – Kobakhidze and the brothers Iverieli – were sentenced to death, while their female co-conspirator Tinatin Petviashvili received a 14-year jail sentence. Despite the lack of evidence, the priest Chikhladze was declared a "ringleader" and also sentenced to death. On 3 October 1984, all four men were shot.

Many details of the incident are still unclear and a series of questions remain open. Shevardnadze has been accused of rejecting the offer by the hijackers' parents to negotiate with their sons the release of the hostages. Many claims have been made that he demanded the death penalty for the hijackers to strengthen his positions among the Communist leadership and to show his loyalty to Moscow. The 108 bullet holes in the aircraft as well as the death of a stewardess remain a source of controversy.

In 2001, a Georgian producer of the Marjanishvili Theater, David Doiashvili, decided to make a performance of the 1983 events. However, the theater administration didn't accept the screenplay of the writer David Turashvili. The latter stated Shevardnadze was reluctant to recall old memories. Georgian human rights organizations claimed censorship in Georgia was still functional. The performance The Jeans Generation, or Belated Requiem was staged, however, at the private Liberty Theatre and gained a conspicuous popularity in Georgia.

In 2003, Georgian-born author and director Zaza Rusadze made a documentary Bandits about the event and its background. The movie was screened at several International Film Festivals and broadcast in German and French speaking EU countries in 2004, as well as on the 1st Channel of Georgian Public Broadcaster.

== See also ==
- Hostages (2017 film)
- Aeroflot Flight 244
- List of Soviet and Eastern Bloc defectors
