= Tazetdin Gilyazetdinov =

Hero of the Soviet Union

Tazetdin Gilyazetdinov Тазетдин Гилязетдинов Таҗетдин Гыйләҗетдинов
- Native name: Tacetdin Ğiləcetdinov
- Born: 1924; Bolshebadrakovo, Bashkir ASSR USSR
- Died: 2012 (aged 87–88)
- Allegiance: Soviet Union
- Branch: 216th Rifle Division
- Service years: 1942–1945
- Rank: Major
- Conflicts: World War II
- Awards: Hero of the Soviet Union

Tazetdin (Tazi) Bagautdinovich Gilyazetdinov (Russian: Тазетдин Багаутдинович Гилязетдинов, Tatar: Таҗетдин Баһаветдин улы Гыйләҗетдинов, romanized: Tacetdin Bahawetdin ulı Ğiləcetdinov; May 2, 1924, in the village Bolshebadrakovo, Bashkir ASSR – August 14, 2012, in Ufa) was commander of the Artillery Battery Fire Platoon, 665th Rifle Regiment, 216th Rifle Division, 51st Army, 4th Ukrainian Front, as a lieutenant. He was the last of the Heroes of the Soviet Union who lived in Bashkortostan.

== Biography ==
Tazetdin Gilyazetdinov was born May 2, 1924, in the village of Bolshebadrakovo, Buraevsky district of Bashkiria, into a peasant Tatar family. He graduated from seven classes, worked on a collective farm, and then from September 1941 to February 1942, worked as a school teacher in the village of Badrakovo, Buraevsky district. He was drafted into the Red Army on February 23, 1942, by the Buraevsky district military commissariat of the Bashkir ASSR. In December of the same year he graduated from the Guryev Military Infantry School.

As a member of the Red Army (beginning October 1943), he distinguished himself in the battles for the liberation of the Crimea. From April 7 to April 9, 1944, Lieutenant Gilyazetdinov commanded the Artillery Battery Fire Platoon, 665th Rifle Regiment, 216th Rifle Division, 51st Army, 4th Ukrainian Front, which was involved in the battles for the village of Tarkhan, Crimea (now the village of Vishnevki Krasnoperekopsky district). Employing direct fire, Tazetdin Gilyazetdinov's unit suppressed three enemy bunkers, two batteries of heavy mortars and three enemy anti-tank guns. On May 9, 1944, during the battle for Sevastopol, Gilyazetdinov's fire platoon destroyed two tanks and two assault guns. Left alone and wounded, Lieutenant Gilyazetdinov then knocked out one more enemy tank.

Captain Gilyazetdinov was a member of the CPSU(b)/CPSU since 1944. He retired from the army in November 1945. In 1960, he graduated from the Bashkir State University. He then worked in the Buraevsky district as a teacher at the Badrakov school. He was also head of the district department of public education, second secretary of the district committee of the CPSU, and director of the Badrakov secondary school. By 2000, he was living in his native village of Bolshebadrakovo in the Buraevsky district of Bashkiria as a retired major. He then moved to Ufa, the largest city and capital of Bashkortostan, Russia, where he died on August 14, 2012. He was the last Hero of the Soviet Union to reside in Bashkortostan. A memorial plaque was erected to Gilyazetdinov in his native village of Bolshebadrakovo.

== Awards ==
- By the Decree of the Presidium of the Supreme Soviet of the USSR of March 24, 1945, for the exemplary performance of the combat missions of the command and the courage and heroism shown in the battles against the Nazi invaders, Lieutenant Gilyazetdinov Tazi Bagautdinovich was awarded the title of Hero of the Soviet Union with the Order of Lenin and the Gold Star medal (No. 6657)
- Order of Lenin.
- Order of the Patriotic War, 1st degree (04/06/1985).
- Order of the Red Star (05/11/1944)

== Books ==
- пред. ред. коллегии И. Н. Шкадов (1987). Герои Советского Союза: Краткий биографический словарь. Vol. 1 (100.000 экз ed.). Москва: Воениздат. p. 911. (page 323)
