= Dmitry Medvedev (lieutenant general) =

Soviet Air Forces Lieutenant general

- Born: Dmitry Aleksandrovich Medvedev; September 21, 1918; Uzlovaya, Tula Oblast, RSFSR
- Died: November 26, 1992 (aged 74); Saint Petersburg, Russia
- Burial place: Serafimovskoe Cemetery
- Military career
- Allegiance: Soviet Union
- Branch: Soviet Air Forces (1935–1961); Strategic Rocket Forces (1961–1965)
- Service years: 1935–1975
- Rank: Lieutenant general
- Commands: 486th Fighter Aviation Regiment; 7th Separate Guards Missile Corps
- Conflicts: Battles of Khalkhin Gol; World War II; Winter War; Eastern Front; Siege of Leningrad; Battle of Kursk; Second Jassy–Kishinev offensive; Prague offensive
- Awards: Hero of the Soviet Union

Dmitry Aleksandrovich Medvedev (Russian: Дмитрий Александрович Медведев; 21 September 1918 – 26 November 1992) was a Soviet Air Forces Lieutenant general and Hero of the Soviet Union. During World War II, Medvedev was credited with 14 victories. He also fought in the Battles of Khalkhin Gol and the Winter War. After World War II, Medvedev served in the Strategic Rocket Forces as commander of the 7th Separate Guards Missile Corps.

== Early life ==
Medvedev was born on 21 September 1918 in Uzlovaya of Tula Oblast in a working-class family. He graduated from 9th grade. In August 1935, Medvedev was in the Red Army. In 1937, he graduated from the 8th Odessa Pilots Military Aviation School and served in a fighter regiment in the Belorussian Military District. As a squadron commander in the 22nd Fighter Aviation Regiment, Medvedev fought in the Battles of Khalkhin Gol during summer 1939. During the battles, he reportedly made 75 sorties and shot down two Japanese fighters and a bomber while flying an I-16. For his achievements, Medvedev was awarded the Order of the Red Banner on 17 November and promoted to Senior lieutenant. At the end of 1939, he became the chief of a chemical service squadron.

From December 1939, Medvedev fought in the Winter War as a squadron commander in the 7th Fighter Aviation Regiment, flying a Polikarpov I-153. The regiment was based on the then-frozen lake of Suulajärvi, engaging in missions involving ground attack and bomber escort. At the beginning of March 1940, Medvedev's plane was hit by antiaircraft fire and crashed. He returned to the front within a week and participated in the Soviet offensive on the Karelian Isthmus.

== World War II ==
At the beginning of Operation Barbarossa on 22 June 1941, Medvedev was stationed in Brody with 92nd Fighter Aviation Regiment. On the first day of the war, he shot down two attacking Junkers Ju 88 bombers. On 24 June, Medvedev claimed two Messerschmitt Bf 109 fighters destroyed. Medvedev's aircraft was shot down on 20 July during a reconnaissance mission, forcing Medvedev to bail out. He reached Soviet lines three days later. In August, he was again shot down but soon rejoined the regiment. Shortly afterwards, the regiment was sent to Kharkiv, where it reequipped with the MiG-3. In November, the regiment was sent to the rear without aircraft to Gorky.

At the beginning of 1942, the regiment was sent to the Volkhov Front to participate in the relief of the Siege of Leningrad. Medvedev became the deputy regimental commander and flew a LaGG-3, receiving the Order of the Red Banner on 12 March. On 22 April, he was awarded the Order of Lenin. In February 1943, the regiment was sent to Gorky to receive new Lavochkin La-5 fighters. In May, the regiment was sent to the Central Front and became part of the 270th Fighter Aviation Division. During the Battle of Kursk, Medvedev claimed three German planes shot down during the first five days of battle. For his actions at Kursk, Medvedev was awarded the Order of the Patriotic War 1st class on 15 July. On 16 July, he became the commander of the 486th Fighter Aviation Regiment. At the end of July, Medvedev shot down two Ju 87 dive bombers over Kromy. In the fall, the 486th was sent to the rear in the area of Gorky.

In 1944, Medvedev became a member of the Communist Party of the Soviet Union. Equipped with the La-5FN, the regiment returned to combat in early 1944, part of the 2nd Ukrainian Front. It fought in the Second Jassy–Kishinev offensive and the capture of Romania. In fall 1944, the front advanced into Hungary. After the capture of Budapest, the regiment took part in the capture of Slovakia and the Vienna offensive. The regiment ended the war in Czechoslovakia after the Prague offensive. During air combat over Prague, Medvedev reportedly shot down multiple German aircraft. On 9 May, Medvedev shot down his last victory, a Ju 52 transport. On 11 May, he flew his last sortie of the war and was awarded a third Order of the Red Banner on 11 June. During the war, he reportedly made 298 sorties, shot down 14 German aircraft and claimed 15 shared victories. On 15 May 1946, Medvedev was awarded the title Hero of the Soviet Union and the Order of Lenin for his actions during World War II.

== Postwar ==
Medvedev was awarded the Order of the Red Star on 15 November 1950. In 1951, Medvedev graduated from the Air Force Academy and in May became the deputy commander of a fighter division. In November 1953, he became commander of the fighter division. Medvedev was awarded his second Order of the Red Star on 29 April 1954. He graduated from the Military Academy of the General Staff in 1959 and became deputy commander of the 30th Air Army of the PVO. On 4 June 1955, Medvedev was awarded the Order of the Red Banner. He was awarded the Order of the Red Banner again on 30 December 1956. In April 1961, he became the commander of the 7th Separate Guards Borislavsko-Khingansky Missile Corps, part of the Strategic Rocket Forces. In 1962, he was promoted to Lieutenant general (technically General Lieutenant, a two-star equivalent position). Medvedev became the deputy chief of the Leningrad Red Banner Military Engineering Academy named for A.F. Mozhaysky in September 1965. By this time, the Mozhaysky Academy was training men who would join the Strategic Rocket Forces (the exact military academy names were deceptive). He was awarded the Order of the Red Banner of Labour on 29 July 1966. In 1974, he became an associate professor. In 1975, he retired and lived in Leningrad. On 30 April, he was awarded the Order "For Service to the Homeland in the Armed Forces of the USSR", 3rd class.

During retirement, Medvedev was the chairman of the city council of veterans. On 11 March 1985, he was awarded the Order of the Patriotic War 1st class as a surviving veteran. In 1989, he published his memoirs, titled "В пылающем небе", or The Blazing Sky in English. Medvedev died on 26 November 1992 and is buried in the Serafimovskoe Cemetery.
