= Aleksandr Gorgolyuk =

- Native name: Александр Иванович Горголюк
- Born: 27 August 1919; Odessa
- Died: 7 May 1993 (aged 73) Moscow
- Allegiance: Soviet Union
- Branch: Soviet Air Force
- Service years: 1937–1946
- Rank: Captain
- Conflicts: World War II
- Awards: Hero of the Soviet Union

Alexander Ivanovich Gorgolyuk (Russian: Александр Иванович Горголюк; 27 August 1919 – 7 May 1993) was a Soviet fighter pilot in World War II until he lost his eyesight due to injuries sustained in the war. He was awarded Hero of the Soviet Union in 1943.

== Biography ==
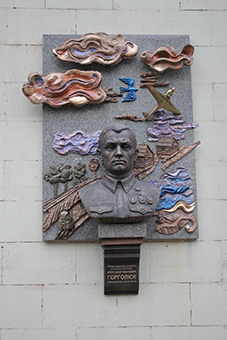
Memorial plaque, Moscow, Tverskaya Street, 17

Alexander Gorgolyuk was born on 27 August 1919. His parents were workers. He graduated eight grades of school, then the professional technical school, after which he worked as a mechanic at the Kinap Plant, at the same time he studied at the Odessa Flying Club. In 1937, Gorgolyuk was called up to serve in the Red Army. In 1940 he graduated from the Odessa Military Aviation Pilot School. Since the beginning of the Great Patriotic War, which began on 22 June 1941, he flew three combat missions. He took part in the Battle of Moscow.

On 16 November 1941 The MiG-3, piloted by Gorgolyuk was shot down. Gorgolyuk received severe burns and spent some time in hospital.

By July 1943, Guard Senior Lieutenant Gorgolyuk commanded a link of the 30th Guards Fighter Aviation Regiment of the 1st Guards Fighter Aviation Division of the 16th Air Army of the Central Front. By that time, he had flown 376 sorties. During his last sortie, on 2 June 1943, near Kursk, Gorgolyuk personally shot down two aircraft and damaged another, but at that moment he was seriously wounded, and his plane Bell P-39 Airacobra was shot down. Seeing nothing, he jumped out with a parachute and landed successfully. As a result of injuries, Gorgolyuk lost his sight forever.

By the decree of the Presidium of the Supreme Soviet of the USSR of 2 September 1943, for "exemplary performance of combat missions of the command on the front of the fight against the German invaders and the courage and heroism shown at the same time", Guard Senior Lieutenant Gorgolyuk was awarded the high title of Hero of the Soviet Union №1112 with the award of the Order of Lenin № 14761.

In total, Guard Senior Lieutenant Alexander Gorgolyuk made 376 sorties on the fronts of the war, conducted 48 air battles, personally shot down 7 and in a group of 6 enemy aircraft.

In 1946, with the rank of captain, Gorgolyuk retired. He continued to live in Moscow, where he graduated from technical school. Before retirement, he worked as deputy director of the printing company of the All-Russian Society of the Blind. He died on 7 May 1993, and was buried at the Kuntsevo Cemetery in Moscow.

He was awarded two Orders of the Red Banner, the Order of the Patriotic War of the 1st degree and a number of medals.

In Moscow, on Tverskaya Street at 17, a memorial plaque was unveiled (sculptor Burganov I.A.).

== Sources ==
- Герои Советского Союза: Краткий биографический словарь / Пред. ред. коллегии И. Н. Шкадов. — М.: Воениздат, 1987. — Т. 1 /Абаев — Любичев/. — 911 с. — 100 000 экз. — ISBN отс., Рег. № в РКП 87-95382
- Подвиг во имя жизни. — Одесса, 1984
- Решетов А. А. Есть на Каме завод. — Ижевск, 1966
- Кузнецов Н. Снаряд ударил в броне-стекло // Авиация и космонавтика. — М:: Воениздат, 1975. — № 9. — С. 20
