= Sergey Grishin (Hero of the Soviet Union) =

Soviet army officer

Sergey Vladimirovich Grishin
- Сергей Владимирович Гришин
- Born: 18 March 1917; Fomino village, Dorogobuzhsky Uyezd, Smolensk Governorate, Russian Empire
- Died: 25 June 1994 (aged 77); Moscow, Russian Federation
- Military career
- Allegiance: Soviet Union
- Branch: Soviet Army
- Rank: Colonel
- Conflicts: World War II
- Awards: Hero of the Soviet Union

Sergey Vladimirovich Grishin (Russian: Серге́й Влади́мирович Гри́шин; 18 March 1917 – 25 June 1994) was a Colonel in the Soviet Army and Hero of Soviet Union, who served as a partisan during World War II.

== Early life ==
Grishin was born on March 18, 1917, in the village of Fomino, to a peasant family of Russian ethnicity. In 1935 he graduated from the Dorogobuzh Pedagogical School, after which he worked as a teacher and head teacher of an elementary school. In 1939, Grishin was called up to serve in the Red Army. In 1941 he graduated from the officer training courses.

== World War II ==
Following the outbreak of Operation Barbarossa, he commanded a tank platoon. After his platoon was surrounded by the Wehrmacht units during the Battle of Białystok–Minsk, he managed to escape and made his way to his native village, where he created a Soviet partisan group, which in November 1941 became partisan detachment 'Thirteen'.

In February 1942, Grishin, as part of his partisan unit, participated in the liberation of the city of Dorogobuzh. From March 1942, the detachment began a raid across the Smolensk region, and from May 1943, across the Byelorussian SSR. In June 1942, Grishin's detachment grew into a special partisan regiment, and in April 1944 it became special partisan unit. The partisan unit led by Grishin inflicted heavy losses on the enemy. In 1943 alone, the regiment fought for 1,500 kilometers, destroying 40 enemy garrisons, killing and capturing more than 14000 enemy soldiers and officers. Grishin's partisans blew up 333 locomotives, 2 armored trains, more than 1,000 vehicles, 9 tanks and armored vehicles, 97 bridges, 2 railway stations, and a number of other objects.

By the decree of the Presidium of the Supreme Soviet of the USSR dated March 7, 1943, Grishin was awarded the high title of Hero of the Soviet Union with the Order of Lenin for "skilful command of a partisan regiment and personal courage and courage shown at the same time".

In July 1944, partisan formation 'Thirteen' merged with units of the 5th Army of the 3rd Belorussian Front, during Operation Bagration.

== Post war ==
After the end of the war, Grishin continued to serve in the Soviet Army. In 1947, he graduated from the Frunze Military Academy and in 1955, from K. Е. Voroshilov Higher Military Academy. From 1955 to 1958, Grishin was as head of the Department of Army staff. Grishin served as an instructor in military schools from 1949 to 1953 and 1958. In the 1960s, he was instructed to form one of the first units of the special forces within the Soviet Army, the 69th Separate Special-Purpose Company in the 2nd Guards Tank Army of the Group of Soviet Forces in Germany.

After his retirement, he lived in Moscow, where he died on June 25, 1994. He was buried at the Troyekurovskoye Cemetery in Moscow.

== Awards and honors ==
Hero of the Soviet Union
Order of Lenin
Order of the Patriotic War, 1st class
Order of the Red Star
Order for Service to the Homeland in the Armed Forces of the USSR, 3rd class
Medal of Zhukov
Medal "For Battle Merit"
Medal "To a Partisan of the Patriotic War", 1st class
Medal "For the Victory over Germany in the Great Patriotic War 1941–1945"
Jubilee Medal "Twenty Years of Victory in the Great Patriotic War 1941-1945"
Jubilee Medal "Thirty Years of Victory in the Great Patriotic War 1941-1945"
Jubilee Medal "Forty Years of Victory in the Great Patriotic War 1941–1945"
Jubilee Medal "50 Years of Victory in the Great Patriotic War 1941–1945"
Jubilee Medal "In Commemoration of the 100th Anniversary of the Birth of Vladimir Ilyich Lenin"
Medal "Veteran of the Armed Forces of the USSR"
Jubilee Medal "30 Years of the Soviet Army and Navy"
Jubilee Medal "40 Years of the Armed Forces of the USSR"
Jubilee Medal "50 Years of the Armed Forces of the USSR"
Jubilee Medal "60 Years of the Armed Forces of the USSR"
Jubilee Medal "70 Years of the Armed Forces of the USSR"
Medal "For Impeccable Service", 1st class
Medal of Sino-Soviet Friendship (China)
