= Hamazan Gizatullin =

Khamazan Gataullovich Gizatullin
- Native name: Хамазан Гатауллович Гизатуллин
- Born: 10 May 1921; Sibirki, Ichkinsky village council, Kyzylbaev volost, Shadrinsky District, Yekaterinburg province, RSFSR
- Died: 19 November 2007 (aged 86) Maykop
- Allegiance: Soviet Union
- Branch: Red Army
- Service years: 1940–1960
- Rank: Colonel
- Conflicts: World War II
- Awards: Hero of the Soviet Union

Khamazan Gataullovich Gizatullin (Russian: Хамазан Гатауллович Гизатуллин; 10 May 1921 – 19 November 19, 2007) was the commander of a 45-mm gun of the 63rd separate anti-tank fighter battery of the Red Army during World War II and a recipient of the title Hero of the Soviet Union.

== Early life ==
Gizatullin was born on 10 May 1921 to a Tatar peasant family in the village of Sibirki, Ichkinsky village council, Kyzylbaev volost, Shadrinsky District, Yekaterinburg province, RSFSR. Now the village is part of the Yuldussky village council, Shadrinsky district, Kurgan region. Tatar by nationality.

After graduating from the Ichkinskaya seven-year school, he worked on the collective farm "Trud Lenina" (according to other sources, "Trud Ilyicha") in the village Titov, Kargapolsky District, Chelyabinsk Region (located in present-day Shadrinsky District, Kurgan Region).

In September 1940, the Kargapol district military commissariat drafted him into the Red Army. Initially he served as a border guard in the Far East, then he graduated from the Vladivostok School of Junior Commanders.

== World War II ==
Gizatullin was appointed commander of the 45-millimeter gun of the 63rd separate anti-tank fighter battery, of the 106th Trans-Baikal rifle division. In February 1943, together with the division, Gizatullin arrived at the front. For participation in the battles he was awarded the medal "For Courage".

Since 1943, a member of the Communist party.

On October 15, 1943, south of the Belarusian village of Love, Gomel region, Khamazan Gizatullin was among the first to cross the Dnieper on a raft, quickly entrenched himself in the captured bridgehead and destroyed 2 machine-gun emplacements and more than 20 enemy soldiers with direct fire, repelled counterattacks and ensured the crossing of the main forces of the division. The gun crew of Gizatullin continued the offensive and for 8 kilometers moved in the forward lines of the Soviet troops, knocking out 7 enemy tanks. Being wounded in both legs, he was sent to the hospital, where he learned that by decree of the Presidium of the Supreme Soviet of the USSR of October 30, 1943, he was awarded the title of Hero of the Soviet Union with the Order of Lenin and the Gold Star medal (No. 1655).

Together with him, the title of Hero of the Soviet Union was awarded to the gunner of his gun, Sergeant Stepan Nikiforovich Kuznetsov and fellow soldiers: Senior Sergeant Aleksandr Mikhailovich Nemchinov and Junior Sergeant Andrey Akimovich Kozorezov.

Returning after a cure, Gizatullin was sent to study at junior lieutenant courses, which he graduated in 1944. Later he fought on the 2nd Belorussian Front. During the Vistula-Oder operation, on January 29, 1945, Gizatullin crossed the Vistula with his crew, seizing a bridgehead on the western bank of the river. The Germans launched a counterattack with the support of two self-propelled guns and infantry, but, having let the enemy into close range, Gizatullin ordered to open fire. At the same time, Soviet artillery opened fire from the eastern shore. As a result, the Nazis were forced to retreat, leaving one self-propelled gun and more than 20 soldiers and officers on the battlefield. On February 21, near the village of Oven, Gizatullin's platoon made its way through the forest to the rear of the Germans and in a short but fierce battle, destroyed up to 20 enemy fighters. For courage and skillful command, Gizatullin was awarded the Order of Alexander Nevsky.

On June 24, 1945, he took part in the Victory Parade.

== Postwar ==
After the war, Gizatullin continued to serve in the Armed Forces of the USSR. In 1953 he graduated from the Advanced Courses for Officers (KUOS).

He served as assistant chief of staff, chief of staff of the motorized rifle battalion of the 428th motorized rifle regiment of the 9th motorized rifle division.

He entered the reserve in 1960 with the rank of major. He lived in Maikop, Adygei Autonomous Region, worked as a mechanic at the Maykop Order of the Red Banner of Labor furniture and woodworking association "Druzhba".

Gizatullin, while in the reserve, was awarded the rank of lieutenant colonel and colonel in retirement.

Since 24 June 1997 he was a member of the Council of Elders under the President of the Republic of Adygea.

He died on 19 November 2007 in the city of Maykop, Republic of Adygea. He was buried on the Alley of Heroes of the Maykop New Cemetery.

== Awards ==
- Hero of the Soviet Union, (30 October 1943)
- Order of Lenin (30 October 1943);
- Order of Alexander Nevsky, (9 April 1945)
- Order of the Patriotic War 1st class (6 April 1945)
- Order of the Red Star
- Medal "For Courage"
- Medal "For Battle Merit"
- Badge «Слава Адыгеи» (Glory of Adygea)
- Honored citizen of city Maykop (2004)
- campaign and jubilee medals

== Recognition ==
- Gizatullin's name is carved in gold letters in the Hall of Fame of the Central Museum of the Great Patriotic War in Victory Park in Moscow.
- October 20, 2010 Yuldus secondary school was named after the Hero of the Soviet Union. Khamazan Gataullovich Gizatullin. (Village Yuldus, Shadrinsky district of the Kurgan region).
- In Maykop, a street is named after Gizatullin.
- Memorial plaque on the house where Gizatullin lived in 1975–2007 (Maikop, Khakurate st., 236b).
- Football tournament in memory of Kh. G. Gizatullin between the teams of Uldus and Sibirkov.
- Tombstone at the Maykop city cemetery.
- Monument in the village of Sibirki.

== Books ==
- пред. ред. коллегии И. Н. Шкадов (1987). Герои Советского Союза: Краткий биографический словарь. Vol. 1 (100.000 экз ed.). Москва: Воениздат. p. 911.
- Хазретбий Исхакович Сиджах (2005). Твои Герои, Адыгея: очерки о Героях Советского Союза. Майкоп: Адыгейское республиканское кн. изд-во. p. 413. ISBN 5-7608-0459-6.
- Хазретбий Исхакович Сиджах (2011). Герои России из Адыгеи. Майкоп: ОАО «Полиграф-Юг». p. 116. ISBN 978-5-7992-0668-0.
- Золотые Звезды Адыгеи (2 ed.). Майкоп. 1980.
- Кубани славные сыны (2 ed.). Краснодар. 1963.
- В. И. Гусев (compiler) (1975). Золотые Звёзды курганцев (2 ed.). Челябинск: Южно-Уральское книжное издательство. pp. 75–77.
- Колосовский М. Ф. (1965). Шадринцы — Герои Советского Союза. Челябинск: Южно-Уральское книжное издательство. pp. 79–84.
- И. П. Шамякин (head of the editorial board) (1984). Навечно в сердце народном. 65 000 (3 ed.). Минск: Белорусская советская энциклопедия. p. 116.
- Н. Г. Апарин; et al. (1980). Золотые звезды Адыгеи. 65 000 (2 ed.). Майкоп: Белорусская советская энциклопедия. pp. 16–17.
- Кошубаев П. К. (2001). Гордость и слава Адыгеи : кавалеры медали «Слава Адыгеи». 65 000 (2 ed.). Майкоп: Белорусская советская энциклопедия. pp. 81–82.
