= Ivan Gnezdilov =

Soviet fighter ace of the Second World War

- Born: 17 June 1922; Shchelokovo village, Kursk Governorate, RSFSR
- Died: 14 January 1990 (aged 67) Riga, Latvian SSR, USSR
- Allegiance: Soviet Union
- Branch: Soviet Air Force
- Service years: 1940–1961
- Rank: Colonel
- Awards: Hero of the Soviet Union

Ivan Fyodorovich Gnezdilov (Russian: Ива́н Фёдорович Гнезди́лов; 17 June 1922, Shchelokovo village, Kursk Governorate - 14 January 1990, Riga) was a Soviet flying ace in World War II; for his actions he was awarded the title Hero of the Soviet Union on 19 August 1944. Later in his career he participated in the Korean War.

== Early life ==
Gnezdilov was born on 17 June 1922 in the village of Shchelokovo (now part of the Shakhovsky rural settlement, Prokhorovsky district, Belgorod region) to a working-class Russian family. He graduated from ten classes of high school. In 1940 he completed his studies at the Belgorod flying club before being drafted into the Red Army in July that year. He then graduated from the Chuguev Military Aviation Pilot School in 1941.

== World War II ==
Since January 1942, Senior Sergeant Gnezdilov took part in the Great Patriotic War. He was a pilot of the 162nd Fighter Aviation Regiment. He flew on the Yak-1 fighter.

In May 1942, Gnezdilov was transferred to the 516th Fighter Aviation Regiment, where he fought for the remainder of the war. In February 1944, the regiment was awarded the guards designation and renamed to the 153rd Guards Fighter Aviation Regiment. In that regiment, he participated in the battles on the Western, Voronezh, Steppe, 2nd and 1st Ukrainian fronts. He took part in the fighting on the Western Front in 1942, the Battle of Kursk, the Battle of the Dnieper, the Nizhnedneprovsk, Uman-Botoshani, Lvov-Sandomierz, Vistula-Oder, Lower Silesian, Upper Silesian, Berlin operations.

By 25 February 1944, he was deputy squadron commander in the 153rd Guards Fighter Aviation Regiment of the 12th Guards Fighter Aviation Division. In total, Senior Lieutenant Ivan Gnezdilov made 245 sorties, took part in 67 air battles, shooting down 17 aircraft personally and 1 in a group.

By decree of the Presidium of the Supreme Soviet of the USSR on 19 August 1944 Gnezdilov, at the time a senior lieutenant, was awarded the title of a Hero of the Soviet Union.

By the end of the war, Gnezdilov was a squadron commander with the rank of captain. Sources greatly differ on the exact breakdown of his tally of aerial victories. His last award list for the war, indicated he shot down 19 solo and 4 shared shootdowns. Initially Mikhail Bykhov estimated his tally to be 21 solo and three shared, but later changed his estimate to 18 solo and five shared. Nikolai Bodrikhin credited Gnezdilov with the same tally as Bykhov initially estimated in his 2011 book, but his earlier 1998 book credited Gnezdilov with 24 solo victories.

== Postwar ==
After the war, he continued to serve in the military, and in 1945 he graduated from the Higher Flight Tactical Courses for Air Force Officers.

Gnezdilov participated in the Korean War as a squadron commander of the 676th Fighter Aviation Regiment (216th Fighter Aviation Division, 64th Fighter Aviation Corps). He was at the front from July 1952 to July 1953. He flew a MiG-15 jet fighter. On 14 September 1952, he shot down an American F-86 Sabre fighter. In 1959 he completed advanced training courses for officers. In March 1961, he retired with the rank of colonel.

He lived in Riga, worked as the flight director of the Riga airport, the head of the emergency rescue service of the Latvian Civil Aviation Administration. He died on 14 January 1990 and was buried in Riga at the Mikel cemetery.

A street in the village of Prokhorovka was named after him.

== Awards ==
- Hero of the Soviet Union (19 August 1944)
- Order of Lenin (19 August 1944)
- Four Order of the Red Banner (23 July 1942, 21 June 1944, 25 April 1945, 14 July 1953)
- Order of Alexander Nevsky (5 September 1944)
- Two Order of the Patriotic War first degree (19 September 1943, 11 March 1985)
- Two Order of the Red Star (30 December 1956, 16 October 1957)
- Medal "For Battle Merit" (15 November 1950)
- Medal "For the Capture of Berlin" (1945)
- Medal "For the Liberation of Prague" (1945)
- various other medals
