= Nikolai Gusarov (pilot) =

Soviet air force colonel

Nikolai Mikhailovich Gusarov
- Никола́й Миха́йлович Гуса́ров
- Born: 4 December 1917; Novosyolky village, Livensky Uyezd, Oryol Governorate, RSFSR
- Died: 3 September 1979 (aged 61); Zheleznodorozhny, Moscow Oblast, Soviet Union
- Military career
- Allegiance: Soviet Union
- Branch: Soviet Air Force
- Service years: 1936–1955
- Rank: Colonel
- Unit: 486th Fighter Aviation Regiment
- Conflicts: World War II; Invasion of Poland; Battle of Kursk; Prague Offensive
- Awards: Hero of the Soviet Union

Nikolai Mikhailovich Gusarov (Russian: Никола́й Миха́йлович Гуса́ров; 4 December 1917 – 3 September 1979) was a Soviet Air Force colonel and Hero of the Soviet Union. During World War II, Gusarov claimed at least 15 German aircraft shot down. He served with the 486th Fighter Aviation Regiment. He retired from the military in 1955 and worked in a ceramic factory until his death at the age of 61.

== Early life ==
Nikolay Mikhailovich Gusarov was born on 4 December 1917 in the village of Novosyolky in the Livensky Uyezd of Oryol Governorate to a peasant family. Gusarov graduated from a 2-year college in Oryol. In 1936, he was in the Red Army. Gusarov graduated from the Kachin Military Aviation Pilot School in 1939. During September, Gusarov fought in the Soviet invasion of Poland.

== World War II ==
When Operation Barbarossa began on 22 June 1941, Gusarov was stationed with the 12th Fighter Aviation Regiment. On 5 November, he was awarded the Order of the Red Banner. On 26 December, the regiment became the 486th Fighter Aviation Regiment. In 1942, he joined the Communist Party of the Soviet Union. During the summer of 1942, he fought in the Battle of Kharkov while flying an LaGG-3. Gusarov provided air cover for Soviet ground troops during the Battle of Kursk during summer 1943. On 5 July, he shot down a German fighter and rammed another while flying a Lavochkin La-5 over Ponyri. He was awarded his second Order of the Red Banner on 16 September. By November, Gusarov had reportedly made 432 sorties, and in 69 air battles shot down 15 German aircraft. He also claimed 14 shared victories. On 4 February 1944, Gusarov was awarded the title Hero of the Soviet Union and the Order of Lenin for his actions in air combat. In June 1944, the regiment was moved to the 5th Air Army to fight in the Second Jassy–Kishinev Offensive. Gusarov, Captain Andrei Girich and Senior Lieutenant Telegin together shot down two Focke-Wulf Fw 189 reconnaissance aircraft during the offensive. In January 1945, Gusarov participated in the Budapest Offensive, shooting down one Junkers Ju 52. He received the Order of Alexander Nevsky on 18 January. During the Prague Offensive in early May, he shot down at least one German aircraft. Gusarov was awarded the Order of the Patriotic War 1st class on 11 June.

== Postwar ==
In 1949, Gusarov graduated from Higher Officers flight tactical training courses. On 19 November 1951, he was awarded the Order of the Red Star. In 1955, he retired for health reasons and was awarded his second Order of the Red Star on 22 February. Gusarov lived in Zheleznodorozhny and in 1959 began working at the Kuchinsky ceramic factory, where he held a job until his death. He died on 3 September 1979 and is buried in the Purshevskom cemetery.
