= Bolshebadrakovo =

Bolshebadrakovo Большебадраково
- Village
- Location within Bashkortostan Location within Russia
- Coordinates: 55°41′N 55°15′E
- Country: Russia
- Region: Bashkortostan
- District: Burayevsky District
- Time zone: UTC+5:00

Bolshebadrakovo (Russian: Большебадраково; Bashkir: Оло Баҙраҡ, Olo Baźraq) is a rural locality (a village) in Badrakovsky Selsoviet, Burayevsky District, Bashkortostan, Russia. The population was 430 in 2010. There are ten streets.

== Geography ==
Bolshebadrakovo is located 20 km southwest of Burayevo (the district's administrative centre) by road. Malobadrakovo is the nearest rural locality.
