= Vasily Golosov =

Soviet sniper (1911–1943)

- Василий Иванович Голосов
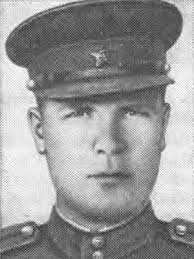
- Born: 1911; Belyov, Russian Empire
- Died: 16 August 1943 (aged 31–32); Izium Raion, Reichskommissariat Ukraine
- Military career
- Allegiance: Soviet Union
- Branch: Red Army
- Rank: Lieutenant
- Unit: 81st Guards Rifle Regiment
- Conflicts: World War II †
- Awards: Hero of the Soviet Union

Vasily Ivanovich Golosov (Russian: Василий Иванович Голосов; 1911—16 August 1943) was a Soviet sniper during World War II who killed at least 422 Germans during the war before he was killed in action during a sniper mission.

== Prewar ==
Golosov was born in 1911 to a working-class Russian family in Belyov. After completing only five grades of school he worked at a drying plant before being conscripted into the Red Army. After finishing his service he worked as a school caretaker in Moscow before being re-drafted into the military in June 1941 due to the German invasion of the Soviet Union.

== World War II ==
Recruited into the Red Army soon after the German invasion of the Soviet Union, he helped to pioneer the sniper movement within the 25th Guards Rifle Division. With good vision, he excelled as a sniper and earned promotion to lieutenant. He trained 170 other snipers and became the commander of a sniper platoon, since many other soldiers in his regiment (the 81st Guards Rifle Regiment) also wanted to become snipers. During the war he was in the heat of many intense offensive operations, including the Ostrogozhsk–Rossosh offensive, Voronezh–Kastornoye offensive, Kharkov operations. On 6 December 1942 he received his first award, the Order of the Red Star, for killing 140 enemy combatants. That year he became a member of the Communist Party.

Golosov increased his sniper tally, and on 16 April 1943 he was awarded the Order of the Red Banner for killing 295 enemies. On 26 June 1943 he was nominated for the title Hero of the Soviet Union for killing 422 Germans. He did not get to receive the award while he was alive, since he was killed in action by a mortar attack on 16 August 1943. He was posthumously awarded the title on 26 October 1943.

His tally of 422 kills was reported in many major Soviet newspapers including Komsomolskaya Pravda and Vechernyaya Moskva.
