= Ilya Grigoriev =

Soviet sniper (1922–1994)

- Илья Леонович Григорьев
- Born: 15 July 1922; Selishche, Smolensk Governorate, RSFSR
- Died: 1 May 1994 (aged 71); Moscow, Russia
- Military career
- Allegiance: Soviet Union
- Branch: Red Army
- Service years: 1941–1946
- Rank: Lieutenant
- Unit: 252nd Rifle Regiment
- Conflicts: World War II
- Awards: Hero of the Soviet Union

Ilya Leonovich Grigoriev (Russian: Илья Леонович Григорьев; 15 July 1922 — 1 May 1994) was one of the top Soviet snipers during World War II. He was awarded the title Hero of the Soviet Union for killing over 300 Germans.

== Early life ==
Grigoriev was born on 15 July 1922 to a Russian peasant family in Selishche village. Before the war he worked as the regional chairman of the Osoaviakhim.

== World War II ==
He began fighting in the war as soon as Nazi Germany invaded the Soviet Union, but it was not until later in the war that he became a sniper. He excelled as a sniper and became a sniper instructor. By May 1944 he killed 301 enemy soldiers, for which he was awarded the title Hero of the Soviet Union on 15 June that year. By the end of the war he killed 328 Germans, and in the course of the war he was wounded six times.

== Later life ==
He was demobilized in 1946 with the rank of lieutenant. He worked as a senior inspector in the Ministry of Transport Construction. He lived in Moscow, where he died on 1 May 1994 and was buried in the Pyatnitskoye Cemetery.
