= Ivan Gorelikov =

- Иван Павлович Гореликов
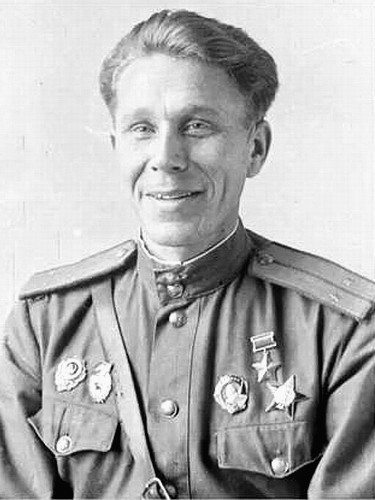
- Gorelikov in 1943
- Born: 27 October 1907; Avdyushino, Irkutsk Governorate, Russian Empire
- Died: 6 November 1975 (aged 68)
- Military career
- Allegiance: Soviet Union
- Branch: Red Army
- Service years: 1941–1944
- Rank: Senior Lieutenant
- Unit: 29th Guards Rifle Regiment
- Conflicts: World War II
- Awards: Hero of the Soviet Union

Ivan Pavlovich Gorelikov (Russian: Иван Павлович Гореликов; 27 October 1907 — 6 November 1975) was one of the best Soviet snipers during World War II, who killed over 300 Nazis. He commanded a sniper platoon during the war.

== Early life ==
Gorelikov was born on 27 October 1907 in Siberia to a Russian family; his father died while fighting against Tsarist forces during the Russian Civil War, and in 1928 he was orphaned by the death of his mother. He soon finished the seventh grade of school and then trade school before starting work as a mechanic at a timber plant in 1929. He later got a job as a watchmaker in 1934 and then worked in ship repair before being drafted into the military.

== Combat path ==
Drafted into the Red Army in August 1941, he was assigned to the 29th Guards Rifle Regiment as a private, but soon got a promotion to junior lieutenant after he showed his skill as a sniper. He organized sniper groups to go on hunts for enemy soldiers and taught other snipers his shooting skills. He quickly became one the best snipers in his division, killing 264 enemy soldiers by 7 November 1942. In January 1943 he was awarded a special personal rifle from general Pavel Belov. On 14 March 1943 he was nominated for the title Hero of the Soviet Union for personally killing 305 Nazis and training other snipers, and he was awarded the title on 28 April 1943. Even after being nominated for the title, he continued to kill enemy soldiers, killing 17 Nazis during the battle for the village of Lubny. Soviet writer Ilya Erenburg personally wrote him a letter praising his combat feats and thanking him for his contributions to the fight against the Nazi invaders.

His photo was featured on the cover of the newspaper Krasnaya Zvezda on 29 May 1945 and his feats were described in detail by major newspapers including Krasnaya Zvezda and Izvestiya.

== Later life ==
After being severely injured in August 1944 he was discharged to the reserve. He died on 6 November 1975 at the age of 68.
