= Vladimir Gasoyan =

Soviet and Russian civil aviation navigator (born 1953)

- Владимир Бадоевич Гасоян
- Born: 5 October 1953 (age 73); Tbilisi, Georgian SSR, Soviet Union
- Occupation: Air navigator
- Known for: Shooting two hijackers aboard Aeroflot Flight 6833
- Awards: Hero of the Soviet Union; Order of Lenin; Order of Vakhtang Gorgasali

Vladimir Badoyevich Gasoyan (Russian: Владимир Бадоевич Гасоян; born 5 October 1953) is a Yezidi civil aviation navigator from Georgia and a Hero of the Soviet Union. He was the navigator of the Tupolev Tu-134A on Aeroflot Flight 6833, which was the target of a hijacking attempt on 18 November 1983. During the attack he shot two of the hijackers who had entered the flight deck. He and the pilot-instructor Akhmatger Gardapkhadze received the title Hero of the Soviet Union by decree on 6 February 1984.

== Early life ==
Gasoyan was born on 5 October 1953 in Tbilisi, into the family of a white-collar employee. He is a Yezidi by ethnicity. The Mykolaiv newspaper Yuzhnaya Pravda named him in 2017 as an example of a Yezidi from the former Soviet Union.

In 1972 Gasoyan graduated from the civil aviation flight school in Rylsk, Kursk Oblast, and he holds the rank of senior lieutenant in the reserve.

By 1983 Gasoyan was a navigator in the Tbilisi air detachment, flying the Tu-134.

== Aeroflot Flight 6833 ==
Flight 6833 left Tbilisi on 18 November 1983 for Batumi, Kyiv and Leningrad with seven crew and 57 passengers. Gardapkhadze sat in the right seat as pilot-instructor, supervising Stanislav Gabaraev, who was making his first flight as captain. Anzor Chedia was the flight engineer and Zaven Sharbatyan, a senior navigation official of the Georgian civil aviation directorate, was aboard as inspector.

A group of seven young Georgians who had boarded as a wedding party attacked the crew at about 16:12, after the aircraft turned back toward Tbilisi because of weather at Batumi. They forced flight attendant Valentina Krutikova to knock on the flight deck door. Sharbatyan opened it and was shot, and the hijackers then shot Chedia.

Gasoyan habitually worked behind a curtain that separated the navigator's station from the flight deck, and the hijackers did not see him. He watched through a gap, then fired his service pistol at the two men holding the pilots at gunpoint. He killed Gia Tabidze and wounded Soso Tsereteli, who fled the flight deck. Vitaly Demidkin, an officer of the Alpha Group, has said that the hijackers did not expect this because the Tu-134A has its navigator station below the flight deck, whereas the Tu-134B shown in the training film Nabat, which they had studied, seats the navigator beside the pilots.

Gardapkhadze also fired on the hijackers. Gabaraev flew the aircraft through sharp manoeuvres that threw the hijackers off balance. The manoeuvres loaded the airframe to +3.15 and −0.6 g, beyond the Tu-134's design limit. Krutikova dragged a hijacker's body from the doorway, which allowed Gasoyan to pull the door shut. The crew landed at Tbilisi at about 16:42, although the hijackers had demanded Turkey. The Alpha Group stormed the aircraft in the early morning of 19 November. Sources differ on the circumstances of some of the deaths.

Gasoyan later said that Georgian security forces on the ground attempted an unprepared assault before the Alpha Group arrived from Moscow.

== Recognition ==
On 13 December 1983 the bureau of the Central Committee of the Communist Party of Georgia resolved to nominate Gardapkhadze and Gasoyan for the title Hero of the Soviet Union and the other pilots for the Order of Lenin and other medals. A decree of the Presidium of the Supreme Soviet of 6 February 1984 awarded Gasoyan the title Hero of the Soviet Union, with the Order of Lenin and the Gold Star medal. His Gold Star medal is number 11504. Gabaraev received the Order of the October Revolution and flight attendant Irina Khimich the Order of the Red Star. A photograph of Gardapkhadze, Gabaraev and Gasoyan was published in the magazine Grazhdanskaya Aviatsiya (issue 8, 1984). A memorial plaque to Gasoyan is mounted on a building of the Rylsk civil aviation college.

== Aftermath and reception in Georgia ==
The hijackers' trial took place from 1 to 13 August 1984, and the death sentences were carried out on 3 October 1984. Gasoyan has said that before the trial people in Georgia tried to contact him to get him to change his statements, and that he refused.

Whether the hijackers were fighters for freedom or criminals has been debated in Georgia since the events, and the story has been taken up in Georgian literature, theatre, film and music. Gasoyan has said that he does not regret firing and that he and the crew were subjected to a heavy press campaign in Georgia afterwards. He initially feared prosecution for exceeding the limits of self-defence, since he was accused of killing "freedom fighters". After the 2017 Georgian film Hostages, directed by Rezo Gigineishvili, Gasoyan said it was about the hijackers and not the crew, though he valued its depiction of how the young people came to the crime.

== Later career and life ==
After the hijacking Gasoyan spent a month in hospital. Unlike some of the other crew members he had not been wounded, but he was examined for the effects of stress and then recovered at a sanatorium. The whole crew was assigned a disability group, and Gasoyan was removed from flying duty in 1984. He obtained a new medical examination and returned to flying in 1985 as a navigator on the Tu-134A. In 1987 he completed courses for overseas representatives at the Civil Aviation Academy.

On 23 June 1993 the Tu-154 on which Gasoyan was navigator, sent from Tbilisi to Sukhumi to collect refugees and wounded during the war in Abkhazia, was hit from the sea. The crew landed the damaged aircraft safely at Sukhumi. The crew was awarded the Georgian Order of Vakhtang Gorgasali for the landing.

Gasoyan left flying in 1995 and moved to Moscow. He worked in the ground services at Sheremetyevo International Airport and retired in 2014. He is a member of the International Association of Veterans of the Alpha counterterrorism unit and takes part in patriotic education events for young people. On the 30th anniversary of the hijacking he and Khimich spoke at a Moscow cadet school. Alpha commander Gennady Zaytsev has introduced him at youth events as a man whose action changed the situation aboard the aircraft. On the 40th anniversary in 2023 Komsomolskaya Pravda interviewed him together with Zaytsev and Khimich.

== See also ==
- List of Yezidi people
- Yezidism in Georgia
- Samand Siabandov
