= Rudolf Golosov =

Soviet vice-admiral (1927–2022)

- Born: 14 November 1927; Ustye, Kalyazinsky Uyezd, Tver Governorate, Russian SFSR, USSR
- Died: 28 May 2022 (aged 94); Moscow, Russia
- Military career
- Allegiance: Soviet Union
- Branch: Soviet Navy
- Service years: 1945–1990
- Rank: Vice Admiral
- Conflicts: Cold War
- Awards: Hero of the Soviet Union

Rudolf Aleksandrovich Golosov (Russian: Рудольф Александрович Голосов; 14 November 1927 – 28 May 2022) was a Soviet naval officer who achieved the rank of Vice Admiral and recipient of the title of Hero of the Soviet Union. He was also a full member of the Russian Academy of Natural Sciences.

== Early life ==
Golosov was born on 14 November 1927 in the village of Ustye in Tver Governorate. In 1942, after finishing seven classes of school, he entered the Leningrad Naval Special School, which was in the city of Tara in Omsk Oblast, after its evacuation during the Siege of Leningrad. After the lifting of the siege, the school returned to Leningrad in July 1944 and was transformed into the Leningrad Naval Preparatory School. In 1945, Golosov graduated with a gold medal and entered the Higher Naval School named after M.V. Frunze. At the school, he received a scholarship, and graduated with honors.

== Military career ==
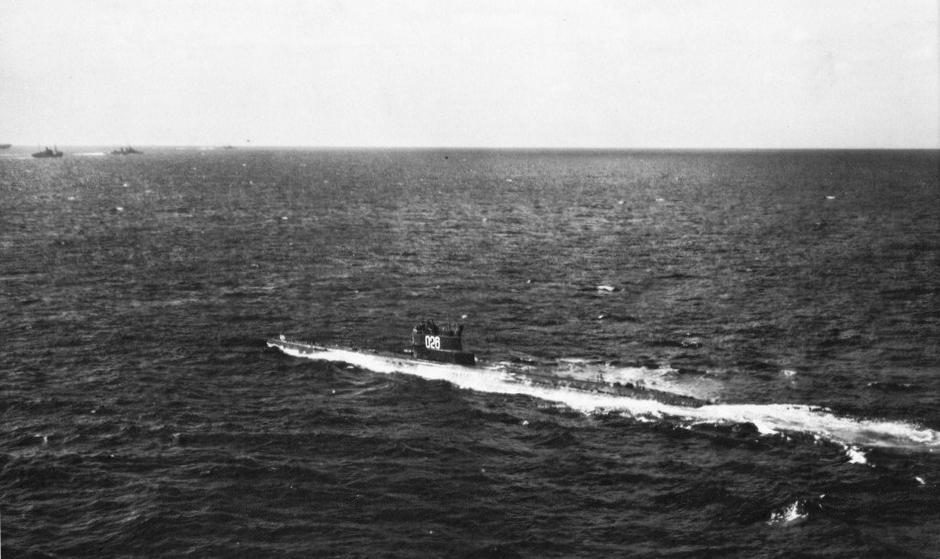
Whiskey-class submarine in the Pacific Ocean

From 1949 to 1951, he served as navigator of submarines in the Northern Fleet and the Pacific Fleet. In October 1950, he served as a navigator on board a submarine, as part of a special-purpose expedition, which was the transition of three Northern Fleet submarines through the Northern Sea Route to Pacific Ocean. From 1951 to 1953, he served as assistant and assistant commander of the submarine in the Pacific Fleet.

In 1954, he graduated with honors from the command department of the Higher Special Officer Classes of the Navy. From 1954 to 1959, Golosov served as commander of different types of submarines within the Pacific Fleet. In November 1955, he was appointed commander of Whiskey-class submarine S-145. Based at Vladivostok, he became the youngest commander of a submarine within the Pacific Fleet. At the end of 1955, S-145, under the command of Golosov, completed a unique voyage in the Sea of Japan with complete autonomy without resurfacing. During the day, the boat sailed at periscope depth, and at night at a depth in which the electric motors powered by batteries charged during the day. For a diesel submarine, this is the most difficult task that the Pacific Fleet did not solve before. Once, when surfacing, the submarine almost fell under a ram of a transport ship, but was saved by the instant reaction of Golosov. The journey was considered successful.

Zulu-class submarine

In 1956, he was awarded the rank of Captain of the 3rd Rank. In May 1957 he was transferred to the Northern Fleet, where he was assigned to the Zulu-class submarine B-72. While serving onboard B-72, Golosov went for the second time along the Northern Sea Route to the Pacific Fleet, en route to Kamchatka Peninsula. 19 submarines and two detachments of surface ships in a short northerly navigation made the trip in three months, breaking storms and icebergs with the help of icebreakers.

Another unique trip made by B-72 was to the southern latitudes of the Pacific Ocean and up to the 60th parallel north. With a nominal sailing autonomy of 75 days, the submarine was continuously in the Pacific Ocean for 120 days, having covered 20,120 miles. In addition to working in space and navigation, purely military tasks were also solved which includes reconnaissance, testing systems, driving performance in various climatic zones and testing new equipment. For the success in the mission, Golosov was awarded the Order of the Red Banner.

From 1959 to 1961, he served as Chief of staff and Brigade commander of submarines of the Pacific Fleet. He then served as deputy commander and commander of the missile submarine division of the Pacific Fleet. After graduating in 1965 with a gold medal from the Naval Academy in Leningrad, he was promoted to Captain of the 1st rank. From 1965 to 1966, he served as Chief of Staff of the Pacific Fleet missile submarine division. A year later, he was appointed chief of staff of the 15th Submarine Squadron in Kamchatka Peninsula. It included brigades of diesel submarines with ballistic missiles and a division of nuclear submarines with cruise missiles. In service were different types of missiles and torpedoes within the Soviet Navy, and Golosov was the only person allowed to direct the practical firing of the entire arsenal.

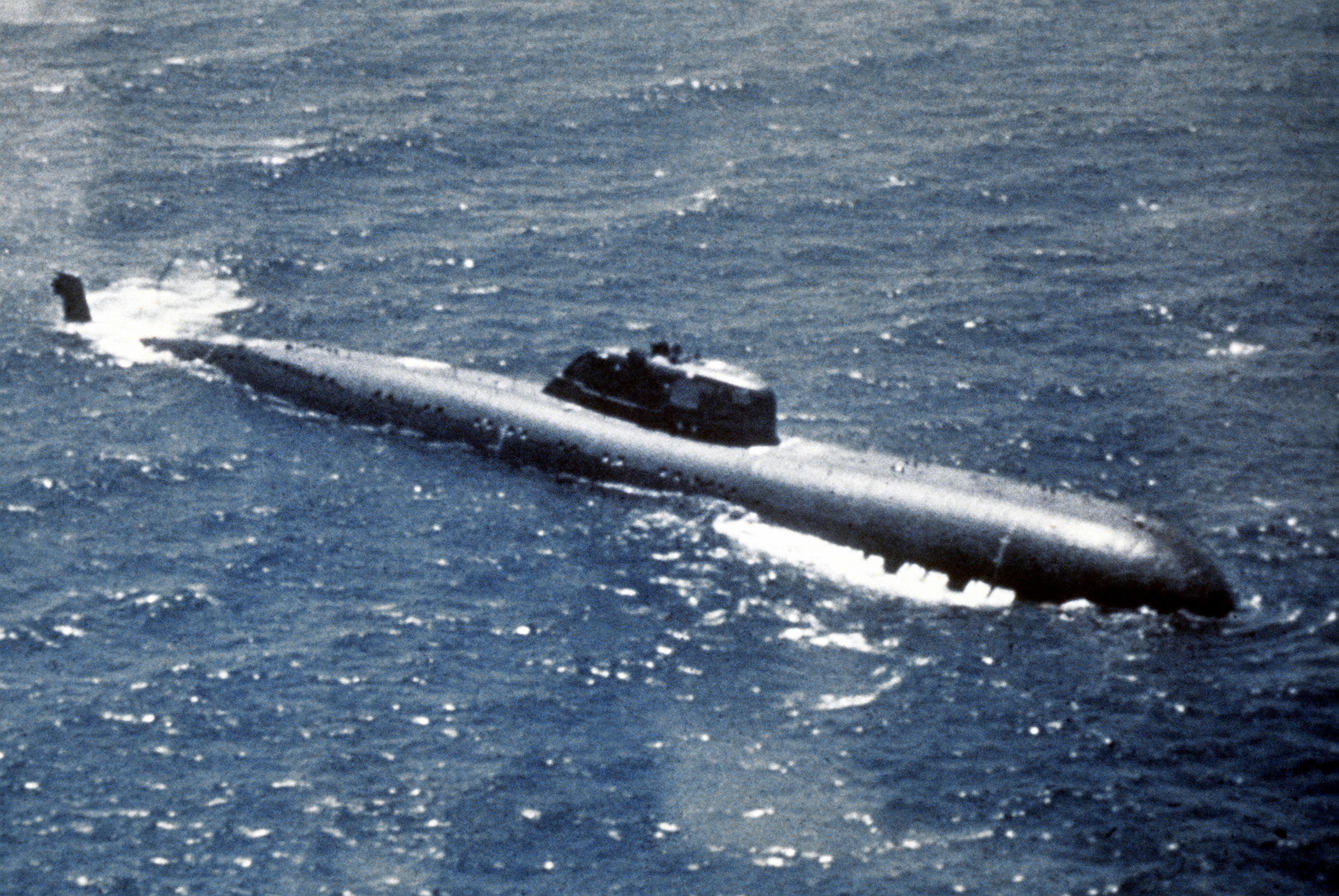
Charlie-class submarine

In 1971, Golosov graduated from the Military Academy of the General Staff with a gold medal and was awarded the military rank of Rear Admiral. He became the commander of the 11th Submarine Division, consisting of nuclear submarines within the Northern Fleet. In this position, Golosov led a cruise of a detachment of Charlie-class submarine K-201 and Victor-class submarine K-314, and three new surface ships and vessels of the Baltic Fleet. The 26,700-mile route ran across the Atlantic, around Africa, across the Indian Ocean, the Straits of Malacca and Singapore, the South China Sea, Pacific Ocean and finally back to Kamchatka. The journey took 107 days with ships and vessels making a number of calls at the ports of Equatorial Guinea, Somalia, Yemen and Mauritius. The submarines for some time carried out combat duty on the approaches to the Persian Gulf, where the United States Seventh Fleet was located.

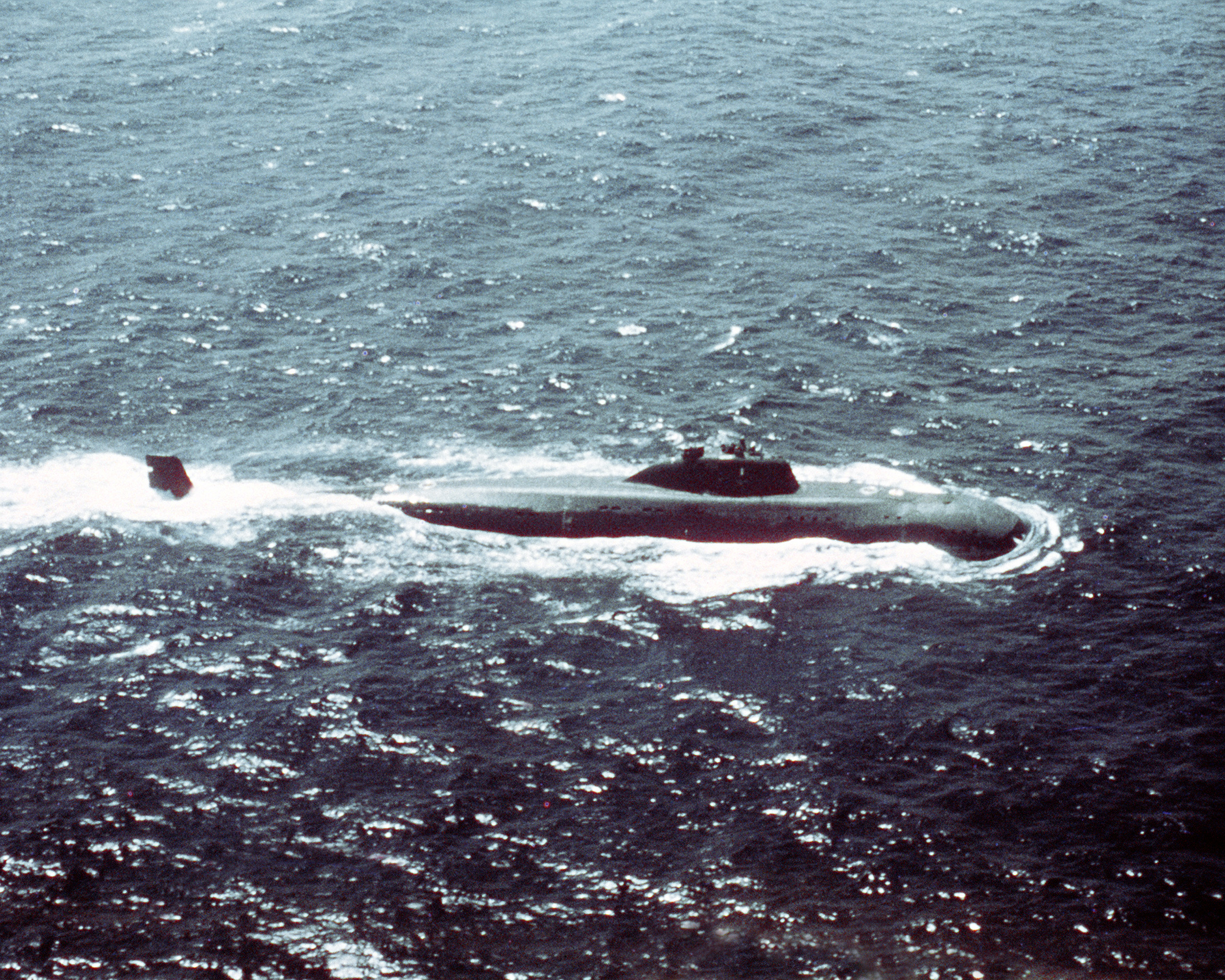
Victor-class submarine

From 1974 to 1978, he served as the Chief of Staff of the 1st Flotilla of the Northern Fleet submarine force, and later served as its commander from 1978 to 1980. From 22 August to September 6, 1978, Charlie-class submarines K-212 and K-325 under his command, completed the passage of the Arctic Ocean under the Arctic ice, which was the first time in the history of submarine forces. By the decree of the Presidium of the Supreme Soviet of the USSR on November 4, 1978, Rear Admiral Golosov was awarded the title of Hero of the Soviet Union for the successful fulfillment of the assignment.

In 1980, after his promotion to Vice Admiral, Golosov was assigned as chief of staff of the Soviet Pacific Fleet. On 7 February 1981, Golosov did not get on the Tu-104 that crashed on that day in the city of Pushkin. The crash wiped out almost the entire leadership of the Soviet Pacific Fleet. Golosov flew out earlier in the morning to Severomorsk to visit relatives, thereby avoiding the disaster.

In 1983, he was appointed to the Department of Operational Art of the Navy at the Military Academy of the General Staff. In 1990, he retired from active service.

== Later life ==
After his retirement, Golosov defended his thesis and received the academic title of professor. In 1992, he was elected a corresponding member of the Russian Academy of Natural Sciences in the Geopolitics and Security section. He and his family remained in Moscow. In 2003, he worked on spreading patriotic education among the Russian youth, by initiating the opening of military museums in schools. In 2007, he published his autobiographical book Produt' ballast! (Blow the Ballast!). He also served as the vice president of the International Association of Public Organizations of Veterans of the Submarine Fleet and Submariners.

Golosov died on 28 May 2022 in Moscow, at the age of 94.

== Awards and decorations ==
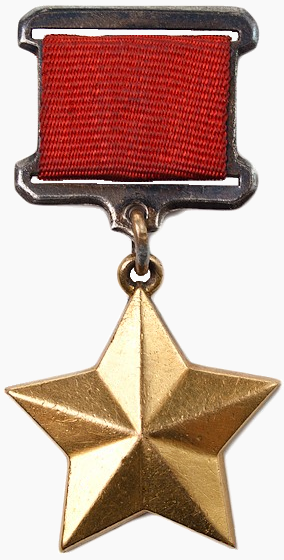

Hero of the Soviet Union
Order of Honour
Order of Lenin	Order of the Red Banner	Medal "For Battle Merit"	Order of the Red Star
Order for Service to the Homeland in the Armed Forces of the USSR; 2nd class	Order for Service to the Homeland in the Armed Forces of the USSR; 3rd class	Medal "For the Salvation of the Drowning"	Jubilee Medal "Twenty Years of Victory in the Great Patriotic War 1941-1945"
Jubilee Medal "50 Years of Victory in the Great Patriotic War 1941–1945"	Medal "Veteran of the Armed Forces of the USSR"	Medal "For Strengthening of Brotherhood in Arms"	Jubilee Medal "In Commemoration of the 100th Anniversary of the Birth of Vladimir Ilyich Lenin"
Jubilee Medal "30 Years of the Soviet Army and Navy"	Jubilee Medal "40 Years of the Armed Forces of the USSR"	Jubilee Medal "50 Years of the Armed Forces of the USSR"	Jubilee Medal "60 Years of the Armed Forces of the USSR"
Jubilee Medal "70 Years of the Armed Forces of the USSR"	Medal "For Impeccable Service"; 1st class	Jubilee Medal "300 Years of the Russian Navy"	Medal "In Commemoration of the 850th Anniversary of Moscow"

=== Foreign ===
- Medal "40th Anniversary of the Victory over Hitler-Fascism" (Bulgaria, 1981)
- Medal "30th Anniversary of the Revolutionary Armed Forces of Cuba" (Cuba, 1985)
- Medal "60 Years of the Mongolian People's Army" (Mongolia, 1986)
