= Pavel Terentyevich Korobkov =

Soviet military personnel

- Павел Терентьевич Коробков
- Born: 5 October 1909; Lipnik village, Kursk Governorate, Russian Empire
- Died: 12 April 1978 (aged 68); Kalinin City, Russian SFSR, Soviet Union
- Military career
- Allegiance: Soviet Union
- Branch: Soviet Air Force
- Service years: 1931–1960
- Rank: Major general
- Commands: 21st Fighter Aviation Regiment; 12th Fighter Aviation Regiment; 486th Fighter Aviation Regiment; 16th Aviation Group Impact; 265th Fighter Aviation Division; 320th Fighter Aviation Division; 2nd Guards Fighter Aviation Division
- Conflicts: Spanish Civil War; Battle of Khalkin Gol; World War II; Soviet invasion of Poland; Winter War
- Awards: Hero of the Soviet Union

Pavel Terentyevich Korobkov (Russian: Па́вел Тере́нтьевич Коробко́в; 5 October 1909 – 12 April 1978) was a Soviet Air Force major general, flying ace and a Hero of the Soviet Union. Korobkov claimed six victories serving with the Spanish Republican Air Force during the Spanish Civil War and went on to at least two more victories during World War II. He retired from the Soviet Air Force in 1960 with the rank of major general.

== Early life ==
Pavel Korobkov was born on 5 October 1909 in the village of Lipnik in the Kursk Governorate to a peasant family. He graduated from elementary school and worked on a farm named after Karl Marx in Lipnik.

== Military service ==
In November 1931, Korobkov was drafted into the Red Army. He served as a cadet at the regimental school of the 11th Turkestan Rifle Regiment, part of the 4th Rifle Division in the Leningrad Military District. He joined the Communist Party of the Soviet Union in 1932. In August, he transferred to the Soviet Air Force and in 1933 graduated from the 8th Lugansk "Proletarian Donbass" Military Aviation School for pilots. In November 1933, he became a junior pilot in the 41st Fighter Squadron at Bryansk. In December 1935, he became the commander of the 17th Fighter Squadron in Babruysk. He was promoted to lieutenant on 14 March 1936. In May, Korobkov became an instructor pilot at the 8th Odessa Military Flying School.

Korobkov was promoted to senior lieutenant on 17 February 1938. In May, he was sent to Spain to fight in the Spanish Civil War. Korobkov was an assistant commander and then the commander of the 16th Fighter Squadron of the Spanish Republican Air Force. During the summer, Korobkov participated in aerial combat during the Battle of the Ebro. By October, he had reportedly made 121 sorties and shot down six German aircraft. On 26 October, Korobkov was transferred back to the Soviet Union and awarded the title Hero of the Soviet Union, as well as the Order of Lenin, on 22 February 1939 for his actions in the Spanish Civil War.

Between June and September, Korobkov was a squadron commander of the 70th Fighter Aviation Regiment (IAP) during the Battles of Khalkhin Gol. He was promoted to major on 2 July, bypassing the rank of captain. On 18 August, he was awarded the Mongolian Order of the Red Banner for his actions during the Battle of Khalkin Gol, as well as the Order of the Red Banner, on 29 August. Korobkov reportedly made 109 sorties, conducted 13 air battles and shot down a Nakajima Ki-27. In September, he became commander of the 21st Fighter Aviation Regiment and took part in the Soviet invasion of Poland.

From December to March 1940, Korobkov participated in the Winter War as an adviser to the commander of the 25th Fighter Aviation Regiment and an aide to the commander of the 14th Fighter Air Army. In April, he became commander of the 12th Fighter Aviation Regiment in the Kiev Special Military District. On 7 May, he was awarded his second Order the Red Banner. During June and July, the regiment participated in the Soviet occupation of Bessarabia.

On 22 June 1941, Operation Barbarossa began and German troops invaded the Soviet Union. On the first day of combat, the regiment lost 36 of its 66 aircraft to German bombing raids. However, the regiment reportedly downed 11 German aircraft while losing three more aircraft. Two of these victories were credited to Korobkov. On 25 June, he also shot down two Junkers Ju 88s. The regiment then fought in the Battle of Kiev. He was promoted to Lieutenant colonel on 10 October. Korobkov was awarded his second Order of Lenin on 5 November. On 26 December, the 12th IAP became the 486th Fighter Aviation Regiment. The regiment fought in the Battle of the Kerch Peninsula. In April, Korobkov became the deputy commander of the 47th Army air force. Korobkov was evacuated from Kerch after its loss in May and became the commander of the 16th Aviation Group Impact. In June, he became the commander of the 265th Fighter Aviation Division. In November, he became a senior inspector for Soviet Air Force Inspection. In February 1943, Korobkov returned to command of the 265th Fighter Aviation Division (IAD) and fought in the Battle of the Caucasus. On 28 May he was promoted to colonel. In June, he became the commander of the 320th Fighter Aviation Division of the 1st Fighter Air Army Defense Forces in Moscow.

In June 1944, Korobkov became the deputy commander of the 215th Fighter Aviation Division of the 8th Fighter Corps and fought in Operation Bagration in the summer. On 3 November, he was awarded the Order of the Red Star. In January, he fought in the East Prussian Offensive. On 21 February, Korobkov was awarded the Order of the Patriotic War, 2nd class. He continued to fight in the East Pomeranian Offensive and the Battle of Berlin. During World War II, Korobkov had reportedly made 64 sorties and conducted 11 air battles. On 6 June, Korobkov was awarded the Order of the Patriotic War, 1st class.

Postwar, Korobkov continued to serve with the 215th IAD, now part of the Group of Soviet Forces in Germany's air component. In February 1946, the 215th IAD was disbanded. In July, he became the deputy commander of the 2nd Guards Fighter Aviation Division in Hungary. In June 1947, he became its commander. Korobkov graduated from the Air Force Academy course in 1949 and in May became deputy commander of the 62nd Fighter Aviation Corps. He was also promoted to major general. In October 1952, he entered the Military Academy of the General Staff, from which he graduated in 1954. Korobkov became the deputy commander of fighter aviation for the Baltic Air Defense Corps in November 1954 and the commander of Baltic Air Defense Corps fighter aviation in May 1957. In November, he became the head of higher academic courses at the Military Academy of the Air Defense Command. Korobkov retired in March 1960.

== Later life ==
After retirement, Korobkov lived in Kalinin City. Reportedly, he was actively engaged in social work.

Korobkov died on 12 April 1978 and is buried in the Tver Dmitrovo-Cherkassy Cemetery.

== Awards and decorations ==
Hero of the Soviet Union (22 February 1939)
Order of Lenin, thrice (22 February 1939, 5 November 1941, ?)
Order of the Red Banner, thrice (29 August 1939, 7 May 1940, ?)
Order of the Patriotic War, 1st class (6 June 1945)
Order of the Patriotic War, 2nd class (21 February 1945
Order of the Red Star
Medal "For Battle Merit" (31 November 1944)
Medal "For the Defence of Kiev" (1961)
Medal "For the Defence of the Caucasus" (1944)
Medal "For the Capture of Berlin" (1945)
Medal "For the Victory over Germany in the Great Patriotic War 1941–1945" (1945)
Jubilee Medal "Twenty Years of Victory in the Great Patriotic War 1941-1945" (1965)
Jubilee Medal "Thirty Years of Victory in the Great Patriotic War 1941–1945" (1975)
Jubilee Medal "In Commemoration of the 100th Anniversary of the Birth of Vladimir Ilyich Lenin" (1969)
Jubilee Medal "30 Years of the Soviet Army and Navy" (1948)
Jubilee Medal "40 Years of the Armed Forces of the USSR" (1958)
Jubilee Medal "50 Years of the Armed Forces of the USSR" (1968)
Jubilee Medal "60 Years of the Armed Forces of the USSR" (1978)
Medal "Veteran of the Armed Forces of the USSR" (1976)
Order of the Red Banner (Mongolia)
Badge "Participant in the Battles at Khalkhin Gol" (Mongolia)
