= Gabbas Giniyatullin =

Soviet soldier

Gabbas Giniyatullovich Giniyatullin
- Native name: Габбас Гиниятуллович Гиниятуллин
- Born: 15 May 1905; Kzyl-Yalan in the Chistopol district of the Kazan province
- Died: 13 April 1968 (aged 62) ibidem
- Allegiance: Soviet Union
- Branch: Red Army
- Service years: 1927–1929; 1941–1945
- Rank: sergeant
- Conflicts: World War II
- Awards: Hero of the Soviet Union

Gabbas Giniyatullovich Giniyatullin (Russian: Габбас Гиниятуллович Гиниятуллин; 15 May 1905 — 13 April 1968) was a soldier in the Red Army. He was awarded the title Hero of the Soviet Union in 1943.

== Biography ==
Giniyatullin was born on May 15, 1905, in the village of Kzyl-Yalan in the Chistopolsky Uyezd of the Kazan Governorate (now the Novosheshminsky District of Tatarstan). He came from a peasant family and was Tatar by nationality. He studied for 4 years at school. He worked on a collective farm. He served in the Red Army in 1927-1929 and from 1941.

Commander of the anti-tank rifle squad of the 69th mechanized brigade of the 9th mechanized corps of the 3rd Guards Tank Army of the Voronezh Front.

On the night of September 22, 1943, Sergeant Giniyatullin was one of the first to cross the Dnieper near the village of Zarubintsy. His unit took part in the battle for the village of Grigorovka, repelled enemy counterattacks, destroying two tanks and killing several Nazis. In the battles for the Dnieper he was seriously wounded.

By the decree of the Presidium of the Supreme Soviet of the USSR of November 17, 1943, Giniyatullin was awarded the title of Hero of the Soviet Union with the Order of Lenin and the Gold Star medal.

After a long treatment in hospital, he returned to his native village. He died on April 13, 1968.

== Awards ==
- Hero of the Soviet Union (17 November 1943).
- Order of Lenin (17 November 1943).
- Order of the Red Star (5 October 1943).
- Medal "For Courage" (22 November 1942)

== Sources ==
- Герои Советского Союза: Краткий биографический словарь / Пред. ред. коллегии И. Н. Шкадов. — М.: Воениздат, 1987. — Т. 1 /Абаев — Любичев/. — 911 с. — 100 000 экз. — ISBN отс., Рег. № в РКП 87-95382
