= Boris Glinka =

Boris Borisovich Glinka
- Native name: Борис Борисович Глинка
- Born: 27 September [O.S. 14 September] 1914; Aleksandrov Dar village, Kherson district, Russian Empire (present-day Kryvyi Rih)
- Died: 11 May 1967 (aged 51) Shchyolkovo, Moscow oblast, USSR
- Allegiance: Soviet Union
- Branch: Soviet Air Force
- Service years: 1939 – 1967
- Rank: Colonel
- Commands: 16th Guards Fighter Aviation Regiment
- Conflicts: World War II
- Awards: Hero of the Soviet Union

Boris Borisovich Glinka (Russian: Борис Борисович Глинка; 27 September [O.S. 14 September] 1914 – 11 May 1967) was a Soviet flying ace during World War II with over 20 solo shootdowns. After being awarded the title Hero of the Soviet Union in 1943 he continued to rise through the ranks of the Air Force, becoming the commander of the 16th Guards Fighter Aviation Regiment in 1944. However, he had to relinquish command of the regiment shortly afterwards due to a severe injury from combat; while bailing out of his fighter he broke both his legs and collarbone. His younger brother Dmitry Glinka, was also a flying ace.
