= Sergey Glinkin =

Soviet fighter pilot (1921–2003)

- Сергей Григорьевич Глинкин
- Born: 2 October 1921; Yelets, RSFSR
- Died: 25 October 2003 (aged 82); Moscow, Russia
- Military career
- Allegiance: Soviet Union
- Branch: Soviet Air Force
- Service years: 1939—1960
- Rank: Colonel
- Conflicts: World War II
- Awards: Hero of the Soviet Union

Sergey Grigoryevich Glinkin (Russian: Сергей Григорьевич Глинкин; 2 October 1921 – 25 October 2003) was a Soviet fighter pilot during World War II. Awarded the title Hero of the Soviet Union on 4 February 1944 for his initial victories, by the end of the war his tally reached 30 solo shootdowns, in addition to one shared kill and an aerostat.
