= Dmitry Glinka (aviator) =

Soviet flying ace (1917–1979)

Dmytro Glinka
- Дмитро Борисови Ґлінка
- Born: 23 December [O.S. 10 December] 1917; Aleksandrov Dar village, Kherson district, Ukrainian People's Republic (present-day Kryvyi Rih)
- Died: 24 February 1979 (aged 61); Moscow, Soviet Union
- Military career
- Allegiance: Soviet Union
- Branch: Soviet Air Force
- Service years: 1937 – 1960
- Rank: Colonel
- Conflicts: World War II
- Awards: Hero of the Soviet Union (twice)

Dmytro Borisovich Glinka (Ukrainian: Дмитро Борисович Ґлінка; 23 December [O.S. 10 December] 1917 – 1 March 1979) was a Soviet flying ace during World War II who was twice awarded the title Hero of the Soviet Union for his achievements, having scored 50 individual aerial victories by the end of the war. His older brother, Boris Glinka, was also a flying ace and Hero of the Soviet Union.

== Early life ==
Glinka was born on 12 December 1917 in the village of Aleksandrov Dar, located within present-day Kryvyi Rih. After completing only six grades of school he worked as an electrician, a miner, and at a brick factory until he completed flight training at the Kryvyi Rih aeroclub and joined the military in December 1937. In February 1939 he graduated from the Kachin Military Aviation School and was assigned to a fighter regiment based in Baku.

== World War II ==
Shortly after the German invasion of the Soviet Union in the summer of 1941 Glinka saw action as a fighter pilot in the Anglo-Soviet invasion of Iran, piloting a Yak-1 of the 45th Fighter Aviation Regiment. Starting in January 1942 he served on the Eastern Front after the 45th Fighter Regiment was assigned to the Crimean Front where they remained until May 1942; the regiment later received the Guards designation and was renamed the 100th Guards Fighter Aviation Regiment in June 1943. From May to July 1942 and February to August 1943 Glinka took part in the Battle of the Caucasus on the North Caucasian Front. He also saw action on the Transcaucasian and Ukrainian fronts, seeing further aerial combat both defensive and offensive operations of Kuban, Donbass, Lvov-Sandomierz, Sandomierz–Silesian, Lower Silesian, Berlin, and Prague.

Exactly one month after scoring his first aerial victory by shooting down a Ju 88, Glinka's Yak-1 was shot down over Crimea after a dogfight on 9 May 1942. He was saved by his parachute but suffered a severe concussion in the process and was confined to a hospital for several months. He was wounded again on 16 September 1943 on a mission to bomb an enemy airfield after a fragment from an explosive tore through his leg. While passenger on a flight on 18 July 1944 he sustained another head injury and was forced to remain in the hospital for two months. However, none of the injuries deterred him from flying.

On 21 April 1943 he was awarded his first gold star, having been nominated for the title on the first day of the month for shooting down 15 enemy aircraft and flying 146 sorties. Soon on he received a second star on 24 August 1943 for raising his tally to 29 aerial victories. By the end of the war he had executed a total of 282 sorties and shot down 50 enemy aircraft. His last aerial victory was a Bf 109 that he shot down over Meissen while flying an Airacobra. Throughout the war he flew missions on Yak-1, Curtiss P-40 Warhawk, and Bell P-39 Airacobra fighters; he scored his first victories on the Yak-1 and most on the Airacobra, but did not score any shootdowns on the P-40.

== Later life ==
After the war Glinka graduated from the Air Force Academy in Monino and held a variety of leadership positions in the Soviet Air Forces, both in the USSR and international bases. He was a deputy in the 2nd convocation of the Supreme Soviet from 1946 to 1950; from 1951 to 1958 he was based in China before being stationed to Poland. In 1960 he retired from the military and made a career in civil aviation, both as a pilot and flight instructor. He died in Moscow on 1 March 1979 and was buried in the Kuntsevo Cemetery.

== Awards and honors ==
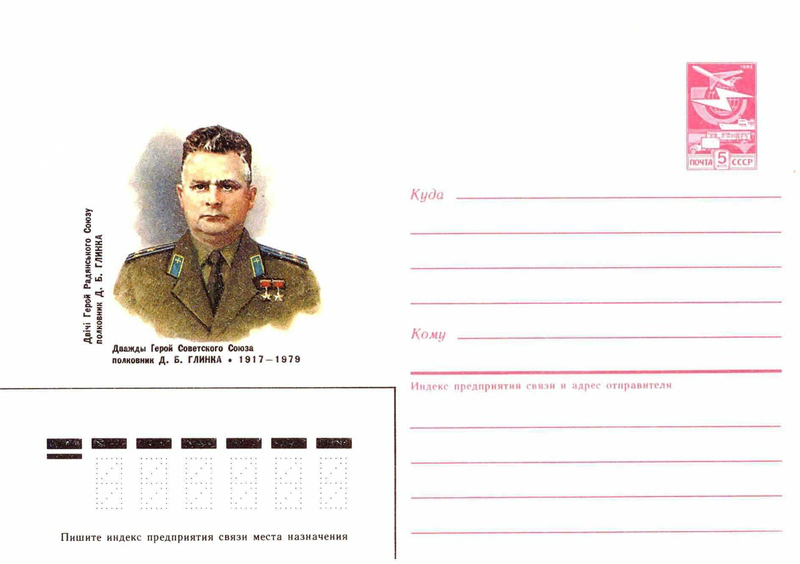
1987 postal cover of the USSR featuring Glinka

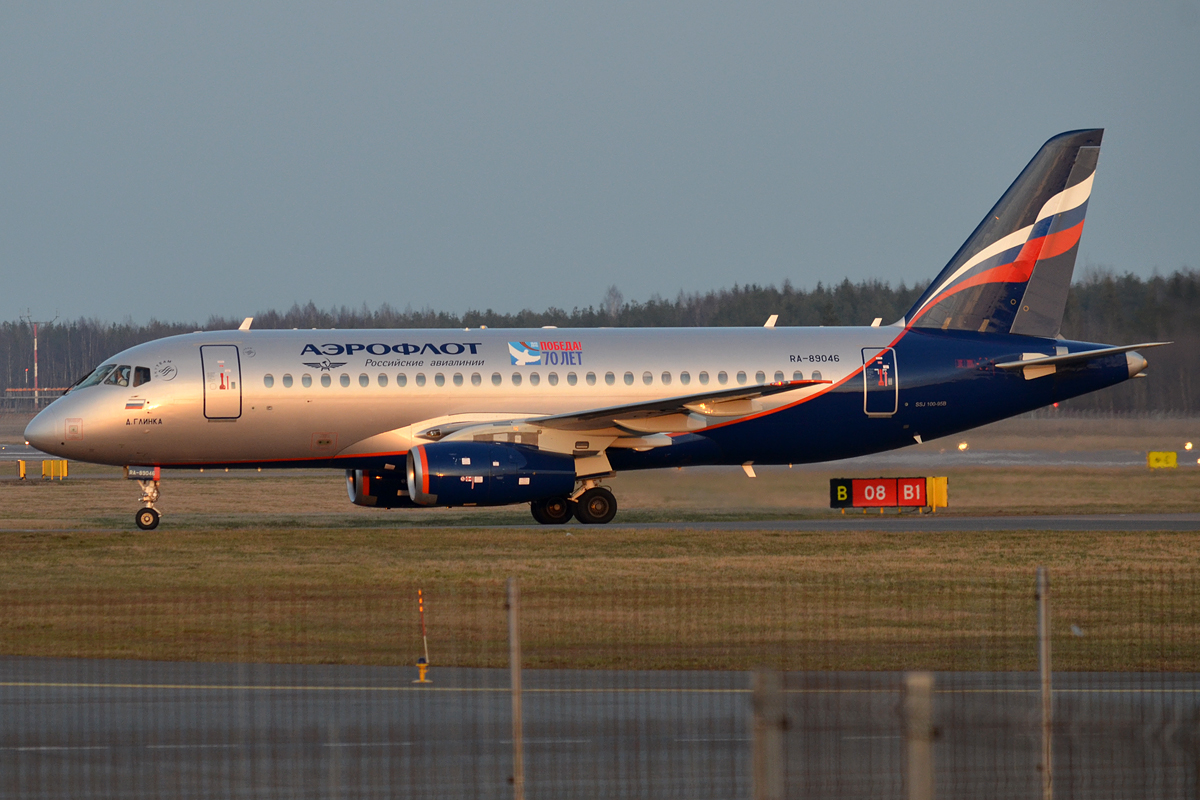
The aircraft named in his honor

Military awards

- Twice Hero of the Soviet Union (21 April 1943 and 24 August 1943)
- Order of Lenin (21 April 1943)
- Five Order of the Red Banner (9 September 1942, 3 October 1942, 22 April 1943, 3 November 1944, and 4 June 1955)
- Order of Alexander Nevsky (13 May 1945)
- Order of the Patriotic War 1st class (24 December 1943)
- Two Order of the Red Star (22 February 1955 and 20 December 1956)
- campaign and jubilee medals

Memorials and commemorations

- A 1987 envelope of the USSR featured his image.
- RA-89046, and Aeroflot Sukhoi Superjet 100, was named after him.
- A statue in his likeness was placed in Kryvyi Rih on the street named in his honor.
- Glinka'a name is featured on a plaque among those of other Heroes of the Soviet Union in the Stela of Heroes in Kryvyi Rih.

== See also ==
- List of World War II aces from the Soviet Union
