= Nikolai Goryushkin =

Hero of the Soviet Union (1915–1945)

Nikolay Ivanovich Goryushkin
- Николай Иванович Горюшкин
- Born: 1 December 1915; Sharapkino village, Don Host Oblast, Russian Empire (located within present-day Sverdlovsk, Ukraine)
- Died: 12 November 1945 (aged 29); Moscow, Soviet Union
- Military career
- Allegiance: Soviet Union
- Branch: Army
- Service years: 1937–1945
- Rank: Major
- Conflicts: World War II
- Awards: Hero of the Soviet Union (twice)

Nikolay Ivanovich Goryushkin (Russian: Николай Иванович Горюшкин; 1 December 1915 – 12 November 1945) was the commander of the 22nd Guards Motor Rifle Brigade of the Red Army during World War II; he was twice awarded the title Hero of the Soviet Union for his actions in the war. He was first awarded the title of hero in 1944 was for the crossing of the Dnieper in September 1943; he second title of hero was awarded for crossing the Oder in January 1945.

== Early life ==
Goryushkin was born on 1 December 1915 to a working-class Russian family in Sharapkino village, Don Host Oblast. His family's home was very close to the local mine, and after graduating from the Konstantinovsky Mining School he worked in that mine, first as a driver and later as operator of a machine for cutting iron. Having been drafted into the Red Army in 1937, he went on to graduate from the Uryupinsk Military Infantry School in 1941. He became a member of the Communist party in 1943.

== World War II ==
Deployed to the front of World War II in July 1941, he quickly rose up through command positions, starting off as a platoon commander and then seeing promotion to command a company, and later commanded a battalion. Having fought in the battle of Kursk, he went on to distinguish himself in the Dniepr crossing, where on 23 September 1943 he led his company to be the first in their regiment to cross to the Western bank of the river. There, they maintained a bridgehead on the riverbank near the village of Grigorovka, and held their ground under heavy enemy fire until reinforcements arrived. For his actions in that battle he was awarded his first gold star on 10 January 1944. Later on in the war on 23 January 1945 he led his battalion in the crossing of the Oder River; there, he quickly diverted his battalion to the side after unexpectedly encountering enemy forces, allowing them to go on to complete their task of taking a key bridgehead and helping tanks cross. For his actions in the crossing he was awarded his second gold star on 10 April 1945, making him a double Hero of the Soviet Union. Throughout the course of the war he fought on the Southwest, Bryansk, Central, Voronezh, and 1st Ukrainian fronts.

== Postwar ==
At the end of the war he held the rank of major. He went on to enter the Frunze Military Academy as a student, but died after an accident of falling down a stairwell on 12 November 1945. He was buried in a mass grave for fallen soldiers in his hometown of Sverdlorsk.

== Awards and honors ==
- Hero of the Soviet Union (10 January 1944 and 10 April 1945)
- Order of Lenin (10 January 1945)
- Two Order of the Red Banner (17 August 1943 and 12 May 1945)
- Order of Alexander Nevsky (29 April 1944)
- Medal "For Military Merit" (26 September 1942)
- campaign medals

The city of Sverdlovsk, Ukraine has a monument to him.
