= Pyotr Gnida =

Soviet military officer

Pyotr Fyodorovich Gnida (June 17, 1918, Tretyakovka, Kharkov province - October 12, 1985, Belovodsk, Voroshilovgrad region) - captain of the Soviet Army, participant in the Great Patriotic War, Hero of the Soviet Union (1945).

== Biography ==
Pyotr Gnida was born on June 17, 1918, in the village of Tretyakovka (now the Belovodsky district of the Luhansk region of Ukraine) in a peasant family. Ukrainian by nationality. He received primary education, worked on a collective farm. In 1939, Gnida was called up by the Belovodsky RVC to serve in the Red Army. From June 1941 - on the fronts of the Great Patriotic War. Participant in the battles in Stalingrad. From May 1944, Gnida was a member of the Komsomol. On January 14, 1945, during a breakthrough of the enemy's fortified line near the village of Chervonka, Warsaw Voivodeship, Lieutenant Gnida's platoon was the first to break into the enemy trenches, destroyed 45 Nazis and two machine-gun emplacements, and distracted the main forces of the enemy. In doing so, Gnida personally destroyed two enemy machine guns with grenades. For this feat, Gnida was awarded the Order of the Great Patriotic War, 2nd degree. (For crossing the Vistula and expanding the Sandomierz bridgehead, he was awarded the Order of the Patriotic War, 2nd degree). By April 1945, Senior Lieutenant Pyotr Gnida commanded a rifle company of the 2nd rifle battalion of the 1054th rifle regiment of the 301st rifle division of the 9th rifle corps of the 5th shock army of the 1st Belorussian Front.

He distinguished himself during the storming of Berlin. On the night of 23–24 April 1945, Gnida and three fighters crossed the Spree River near Treptow and ensured the successful crossing of the entire battalion, personally killing 17 enemy soldiers and officers with machine gun fire. From 24 to 28 April, Gnida's company captured 4 multi-story buildings in Berlin, including the building of the Nazi German Ministry of Finance, destroyed about 120 and captured 68 enemy soldiers and officers, captured 12 heavy machine guns, an armored personnel carrier, and a large quantity of small arms. On 28 April, Gnida was wounded twice and met the end of the war in a hospital.

By the Decree of the Presidium of the Supreme Soviet of the USSR of May 31, 1945, for “exemplary performance of combat missions of the command on the front in the fight against the German invaders and the courage and heroism displayed in doing so”, Senior Lieutenant Pyotr Fyodorovich Gnida was awarded the title of Hero of the Soviet Union with the presentation of the Order of Lenin and the Gold Star medal, number 6818[4].

Member of the CPSU since 1945. In August 1946, with the rank of captain, Gnida was discharged into the reserve. He graduated from the Starobelsk school for training agricultural management personnel. He lived in the village of Belovodsk in the Voroshilovgrad region of the Ukrainian SSR, and worked as an engineer for petroleum products in the district department of "Selkhoztekhnika". He died on October 12, 1985. He was also awarded the Order of Lenin, the Order of the Patriotic War of the 1st and 2nd degree, and a number of medals.

== Books ==
- Shkadov, Ivan, ed. (1988). Герои Советского Союза: краткий биографический словарь [Heroes of the Soviet Union: A Brief Biographical Dictionary] (in Russian). Vol. 2. Moscow: Voenizdat. ISBN 5203005362.
