= Gennady Gabaidulin =

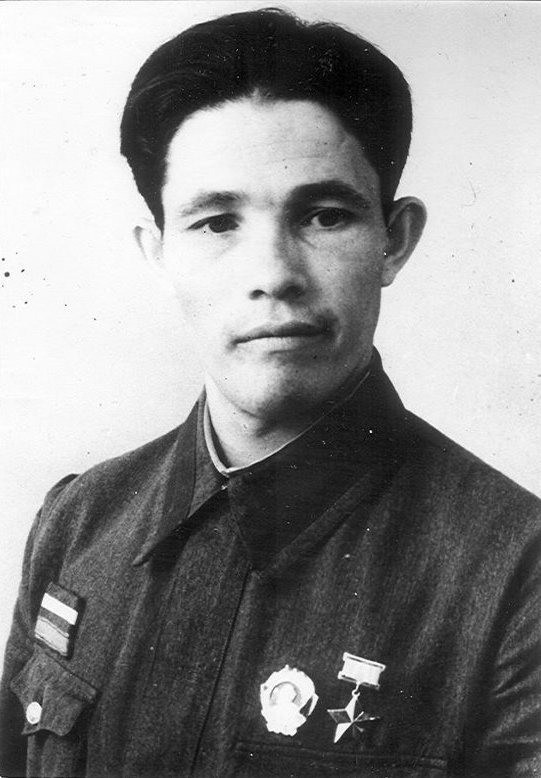
- Born: 15 June 1914; Tokayevo village, Kazan Governorate, Russian Empire
- Died: 14 May 1981 (aged 66) Gorky, RSFSR, USSR
- Allegiance: Soviet Union
- Branch: Red Army
- Service years: 1936–1939; 1941–1945
- Rank: Senior lieutenant
- Awards: Hero of the Soviet Union

Gennady Gabaydulovich Gabaidulin (Tatar: Гыйниятулла Гобәйдулла улы, Russian: Габайдулин Геннадий Габайдулович; 15 June 1914, Tokayevo village, Kazan Governorate (Note: Now as part of Urmaevo settlement, Komsomolsky District, Chuvashia, Russia.) — 14 May 1981) was an officer in the Red Army who was awarded the title Hero of the Soviet Union for his bravery during the fighting for Rzhev in 1942.

== Early life ==
Gabaidulin was born on 15 June 1914 in the village of Tokayevo to a Tatar peasant family. He graduated from a seven-year school and worked on a collective farm. In 1932 he moved to the city of Gorky, where he worked at a car factory, first as an apprentice, then as a mechanic. From 1936 to 1939 he served in the Red Army in the Far East. Demobilized with the rank of junior machine gun platoon commander, he returned to work at the Gorky Automobile Plant. He became a member of the Communist party in 1944.

== World War II ==
In August 1941 he volunteered for the front. Having been appointed commander of the reconnaissance squad of the 24th separate mortar division (29th Army, Kalinin Front), he received his baptism of fire in the battle for Moscow. On 7 February 1942, near the city of Rzhev, six scouts under his command were killed by a German ambush. After the death of his comrades, he continued to fight alone until reinforcements arrived despite sustaining severe wounds. On 24 March 1942, he was awarded the title of Hero of the Soviet Union by decree of the Presidium of the Supreme Soviet for his fortitude and valor shown in that battle.

After completing the brief training at the Arzamas Military School, he was made commander of a control platoon in part of a guards mortar unit on the Leningrad Front. He subsequently participated in the battle to end the blockade of Leningrad. He then saw battle on the Karelian Isthmus and was wounded during the capture of Vyborg. After treatment in the hospital, he returned to the warfront, participating in the capture of Magdeburg and the Battle in Berlin.

== Later life ==
Having been demobilized in December 1945 with the rank of senior lieutenant, he initially worked in Primorsky Krai as an electric locomotive driver in a mine. He then returned to the city of Gorky, where he raised two daughters and a son. Prior to retirement, he worked at the Gorky Automobile Plant. He died on 14 May 1981 and was buried in the Staro-Avtozavodsky cemetery. In Nizhny Novgorod, (Note: Formerly named Gorky) a memorial plaque was installed on the house where Gabaidulin previously lived.

== Awards ==
- Hero of the Soviet Union (24 March 1942);
- Order of Lenin (24 March 1942);
- Order of the Red Star (15 August 1944)
- campaign medals including:

Medal "For the Defence of Leningrad" (1943);
Medal "For the Defence of Moscow";
Medal "For the Victory over Germany in the Great Patriotic War 1941–1945";
Medal "For the Capture of Berlin".
