= Malik Gabdullin =

Soviet Kazakh philologist, professor, and writer (1915–1973)

- Born: 2 November [O.S. 15 November] 1915; Koysalgan, Akmolinsk Oblast, Russian Empire
- Died: 2 January 1973; Almaty, Kazakh SSR, USSR
- Education: Abai Kazakh Pedagogical Institute
- Awards: Hero of the Soviet Union

Malik Gabdullin (Kazakh: Мәлік Ғабдуллин, Russian: Малик Габдуллин; 2 November [O.S. 15 November] 1915 – 2 January 1973) was a Soviet–Kazakh philologist, professor, and writer. A veteran of the Second World War, he was awarded the title Hero of the Soviet Union for his bravery in battle.

== Early life ==
He was born on 2 November [O.S. 15 November] 1915, in the village of Pukhalskoye (now in Zerendinsky district, Akmola region, Kazakhstan). He was an ethnic Kazakh. He is a direct descendant of Kanai Kuttymbetuly, a Kazakh biy, one of the leaders of the Kazakhs of the Middle Zhuz, a major commander, chief adviser to Abylai Khan and a public figure of the 18th century. Belonged to the Middle Zhuz, subgenus Karauyl of the genus Argyn. From the age of 14 he was brought up in the family of the famous Kazakh writer Sabit Mukanov.

After graduating from the Abai Kazakh Pedagogical Institute in 1935 he entered military service, where he remained until 1937. He then got a job at the newspaper Socialist Kazakhstan, and later became deputy editor of the newspaper Kazakhstan Pioneer before moving on to be a researcher at the Institute of Language and Literature of the KazFAN of the USSR before returning to the Abai Institute to begin his postgraduate studies.

== World War II ==
From 1941 to 1945 he fought in World War II as part of the Panfilov Division.

In January–March 1942, in the battles near the town of Kholm, Novgorod Region, Gabdullin led a group of soldiers. In a battle with the prevailing enemy forces, they knocked out 2 tanks with grenades, inflicted heavy losses on the enemy and captured 12 people. Gabdullin was wounded in battle, but did not leave the battlefield. For this feat, senior political instructor Malik Gabdullin was awarded the title of Hero of the Soviet Union by the Decree of the Presidium of the Supreme Soviet of the USSR dated 30 January 1943.

== Post-war career ==
After the war, he engaged in scientific and pedagogical activities. He was the director of the Institute of Literature and Linguistics of the Academy of Sciences of the Kazakh SSR from 1946 to 1951, Rector of the Abai KazPI from 1953 to 1963, head of the folklore department of the Institute of Literature and Art named after M. O. Auezov of the Academy of Sciences of the Kazakh SSR from 1963 to 1973. The main topic of Malik Gabdullin's research is the heroic epics, folk songs, aytys, fairy tales, proverbs and sayings of the Kazakh people.

He took part in the preparation and publication of the multivolume history of Kazakh literature. His scientific work "Kazakh Heroic Epic" was awarded the prize named after Shoqan Walikhanov in 1972. He authored of a number of works of the genre of fiction: «Мои фронтовые друзья» (1947), «Золотая звезда» (1948), «Фронтовые очерки» (1949), «Будни войны» (1968), «О друзьях, товарищах» (1969), «Грозные годы» (1971). Some of the works were published in Russian, translated by Ivan Shchegolikhin.

Gabdullin was a member of the CPSU since 1940, and was elected a deputy of the Supreme Soviet of the USSR of the 2nd–4th convocations.

Gabdullin had a daughter, Maidan Malikovna, granddaughters Amin and Madina, great-grandchildren Malik, Jamilya, Ilyas and Maya.

== Awards ==
- Medal «Gold Star» (Hero of the Soviet Union) (30.01.1943)
- Order of Lenin (30.01.1943)
- Order of the Red Banner
- Order of the Patriotic War first degree
- Two Order of the Red Star (17.01.1942
- USSR medals
- Abilmansur Batpenov

== Memory ==
- Malik Gabdullin is the hero of the story «Рождение эпоса» (The Birth of the Epic) published in the collection of war stories by Boris Polevoy « Мы - советские люди » (We are Soviet People) (1948).
- By the Resolution of the Cabinet of Ministers of the Republic of Kazakhstan No. 465 dated May 7, 1993 and the order of the akim of the Kokshetau region No. 1-39 dated September 4, 1995, the Malik Gabdullin Museum was opened in the city of Kokshetau.
- On April 21, 1999, a school in the Karasai district of the Almaty region was named after Malik Gabdullin (before that, the school named after Nikolai Chernyshevsky).
- In the cities of Almaty, Astana, Kokshetau, Derzhavinsk (Zharkainsky district of Akmola region) there are Gabdullin streets.
- In the homeland of Gabdullin in the village of Zerenda (Zerenda district, Akmola region), there is a street and a school named after Malik Gabdullin, as well as a three-meter monument
- In the city of Kokshetau there is a school number 3 named after Malik Gabdullin
- Kokshetau Technical Institute is named after Malik Gabdullin.
- In 2015, in Kokshetau, on the eve of the celebration of the 70th anniversary of the victory, a monument to Gabdullin was unveiled.
