= Andrei Girich =

Soviet Air Force general, Hero of the Soviet Union, and World War II flying ace

Andrei Ivanovich Girich
- Андрей Иванович Гирич
- Born: 28 December 1918; Yahotyn, Kiev Governorate
- Died: 11 April 1973 (aged 54); Monino, Moscow Oblast, Soviet Union
- Military career
- Allegiance: Soviet Union
- Branch: Soviet Air Force
- Service years: 1939–1973
- Rank: Major general
- Conflicts: World War II; Crimean Campaign; Battle of Debrecen; Siege of Budapest; Prague Offensive
- Awards: Hero of the Soviet Union

Andrei Ivanovich Girich (Russian: Андрей Иванович Гирич; 28 December 1918 – 11 April 1973) was a Ukrainian Soviet Air Force major general and Hero of the Soviet Union. Girich claimed at least 17 victories against German aircraft during World War II. He was a squadron commander in the 486th Fighter Aviation Regiment during the war.

== Early life ==
Girich was born on 28 December 1918 in Yahotyn to a working-class family. He graduated from the Kiev River College in 1938. Girich learned to fly at the Kiev aeroclub. He also worked as the assistant captain of the Leningrad, a ship operated by the Dnieper River Shipping Company. In 1939, he was drafted into the Red Army and was sent to the Odessa Military Air College. In 1941, he joined the Communist Party of the Soviet Union.

== World War II ==
When Operation Barbarossa began on 22 June 1941, Girich was a flight leader in the 12th Fighter Aviation Regiment. On 25 June, he shot down a Junkers Ju 88 by frontal attack over Stanislaus. Girich intercepted and shot down a second Ju 88 over Lozova railway station on 28 September. In November, the regiment was sent to Crimea. On 5 November, Girich was awarded the Order of the Red Star. On 26 December, the 12th Fighter Aviation Regiment became the 486th Fighter Aviation Regiment. Girich became a squadron commander in the regiment. On 3 February 1942, he shot down an Bf 109 over Kerch Strait. In the air battle, his squadron shot down three more Bf 109s without losing any aircraft. On 16 March, Girich's squadron tangled with twelve German fighters over Kerch Strait. In this engagement, Girich shot down another Bf 109. On 9 May, six fighters led by Girich fought an air battle with 40 Bf 109s over Karatch. The squadron shot down five Bf 109s and Girich gained another victory.

After being withdrawn from Crimea, the regiment was sent to Moscow for air defense in August. On 5 November, Girich shot down a Heinkel He 111 over Ostashkov. In the summer of 1943, the regiment was sent to the Central Front. Between 15 July and 8 December, Girich reportedly made 103 sorties, conducted 17 air battles and shot down seven German aircraft. On 4 September, he was awarded the Order of the Red Banner. On 6 September, he shot down a Ju 88 over Oblozhki. On 21 October, he shot down two Ju 88s over Kolpen and Ostrovy. In December, the regiment was sent to the rear for resupply but moved to Oryol in May 1944. It fought in Operation Bagration and the Lublin–Brest Offensive during the summer. In August, it transferred to the 5th Air Army and fought in the Jassy–Kishinev Offensive. On 25 August, Girich shot down a Focke-Wulf Fw 190 over Huși. On 3 September, he claimed another Fw 190 over Ploiești. By 20 September, when he was recommended for an award of the title Hero of the Soviet Union, Girich had made 439 sorties and shot down 15 enemy aircraft. On 23 September, he shot down another Fw 190 over Turda. From October, the regiment fought in the Budapest Offensive. Girich shot down a Bf 190 over Isaszeg on 17 November. In January 1945, the German forces attempted to resupply Budapest by air. Girich reportedly shot down a Junkers Ju 52. On 23 February 1945, Girich was awarded the title Hero of the Soviet Union and the Order of Lenin. The regiment then fought in the Prague Offensive in early May. During the offensive, Girich shot down another German aircraft. On 8 June, he received the Order of Suvorov 3rd class. According to Mikhail Bykhov, Girich claimed 17 and four shared victories, flew 478 sorties and conducted 84 air battles.

== Postwar ==
Girich continued to serve in the Soviet Air Force after the end of the war. He commanded an aviation division. In 1950, he graduated from the Air Force Academy. On 30 December 1946, he was awarded his second Order of the Red Star. Girich graduated from the Military Academy of the General Staff in 1958 with the rank of major general. He was appointed a departmental head in the Air Force Academy shortly afterwards. Girich lived in Monino and died on 11 April 1973.

== Awards and honors ==
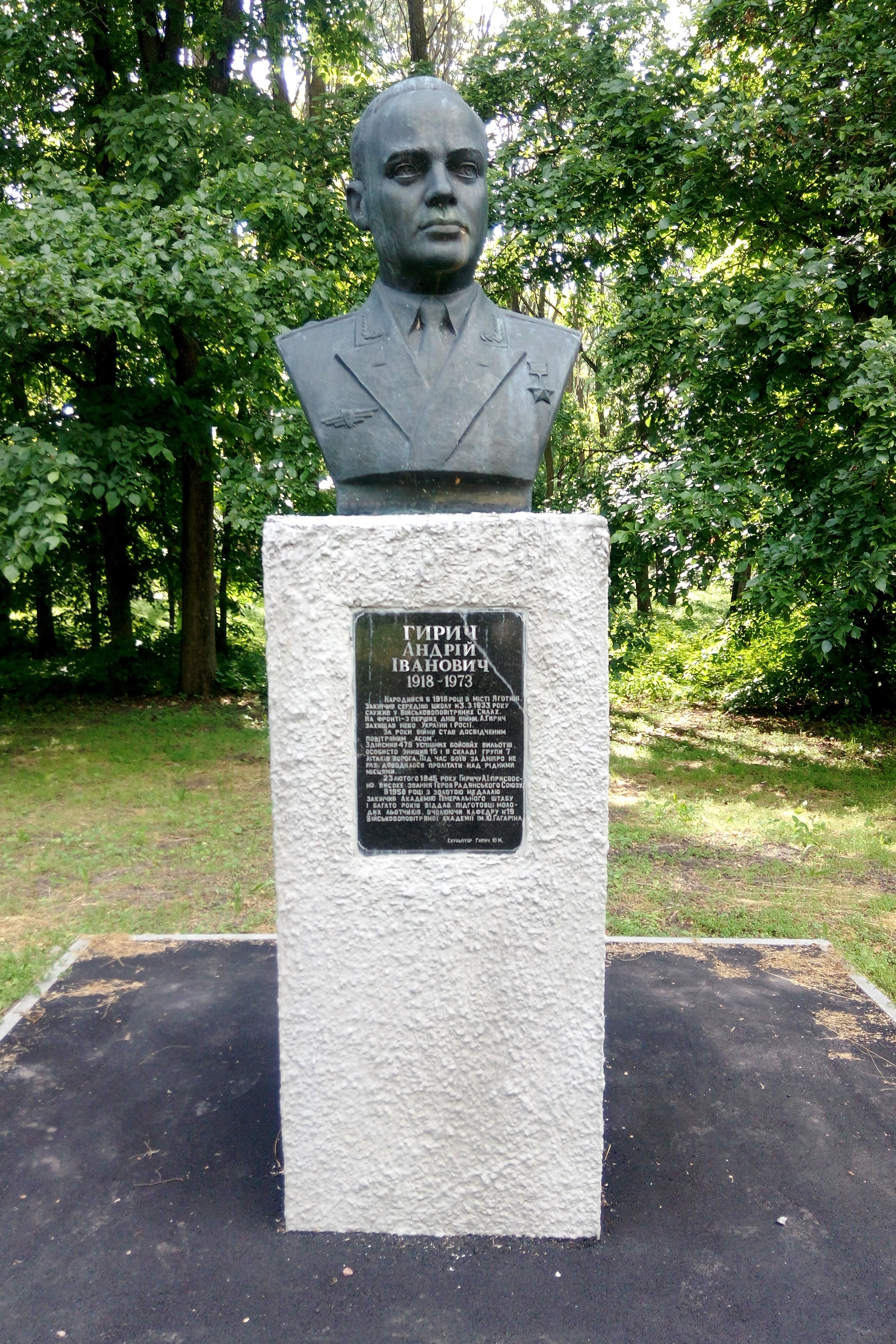
Bust honoring Girich in Yahotyn

Hero of the Soviet Union (23 February 1945)
Order of Lenin (23 February 1945)
Order of the Red Banner (4 September 1943)
Order of Suvorov, 3rd class (8 June 1945)
Medal "For Battle Merit"
Order of the Red Star, twice (5 November 1941, 30 June 1956)
Medal "For the Capture of Budapest" (1945)
Medal "For the Capture of Vienna" (1945)
Medal "For the Liberation of Prague" (1945)
Medal "For the Victory over Germany in the Great Patriotic War 1941–1945" (1945)
Jubilee Medal "Twenty Years of Victory in the Great Patriotic War 1941-1945" (1965)
Jubilee Medal "In Commemoration of the 100th Anniversary of the Birth of Vladimir Ilyich Lenin" (1969)
Jubilee Medal "30 Years of the Soviet Army and Navy" (1948)
Jubilee Medal "40 Years of the Armed Forces of the USSR" (1958)
Jubilee Medal "50 Years of the Armed Forces of the USSR" (1968)
