= List of burials at Serafimovskoe Cemetery =

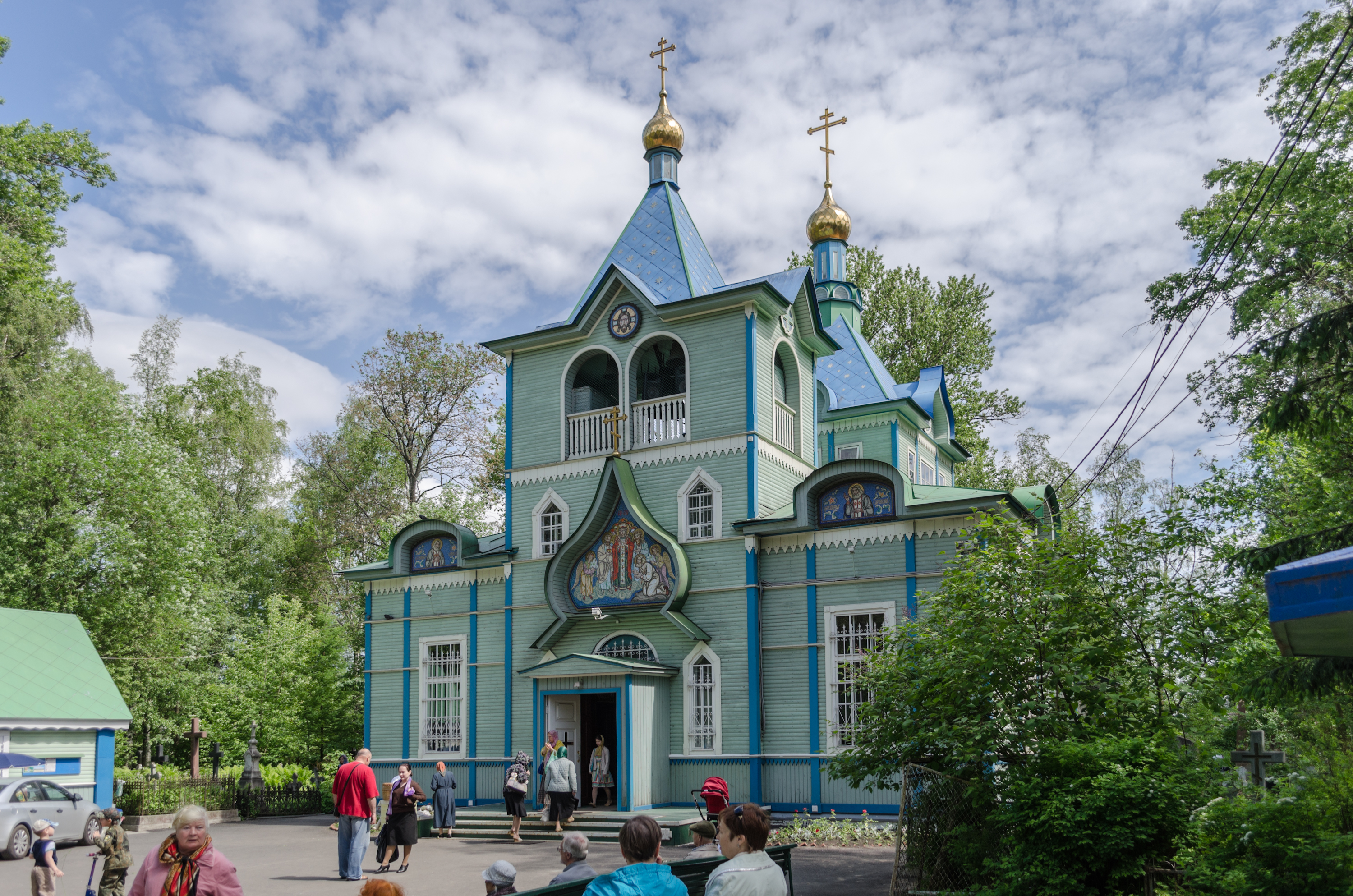
The Church of Seraphim of Sarov in the Serafimovskoe Cemetery

Serafimovskoe Cemetery (Russian: Серафимовское кладбище) in northwestern Saint Petersburg's Primorsky District, contains a large number of burials as well as monuments and memorials to notable figures in Soviet and Russian history.

The cemetery was created from land set aside in 1903, with the first burial taking place on 28 May 1905. It was mainly a burial location for the poor of the area, as well as soldiers and sailors who died in the First World War. It rose to prominence in the Second World War when it became a site of numerous mass graves of those who died in the siege of Leningrad from 1941 to 1944. Since then leading figures from a variety of sections of society have been interred in the cemetery. Saint Petersburg's history as a naval base have made the cemetery a popular location for naval officers. Those buried at the Serafimovskoe Cemetery include Giorgi Abashvili, Vladimir Alafuzov, Ivan Yumashev, and Mikhail Zakharov. There are also memorials to several maritime accidents and disasters, including the sinking of the ships Mekhanik Tarasov and Polessk, and the loss of the submarines Kursk and Komsomolets. On 6 July 2019 the fourteen men who died in a fire aboard the submarine Losharik were interred in the cemetery. A memorial also commemorates the dead of the 1981 Pushkin Tu-104 crash, which included a large number of Soviet Navy officers. Other military figures interred in the cemetery include Soviet Air Force Lieutenant General Dmitry Alexandrovich Medvedev, two flying aces of the Korean War; Anatoly Karelin and Mikhail Mikhin, and Major General Sergei Ivanovich Tiulpanov, who commanded the Propaganda Administration of the Soviet Military Administration in Germany. Among the many other Heroes of the Soviet Union who were buried here are Boris Alekseyev, Nikolai Archakov, Ivan Afanasyev, Anton Gurin, Pavel Pavlov, and Fyodor Simakov.

Numerous sportspeople have also been buried here, among whom; Olympians Valentin Boreyko, Igor Novikov, Nikolai Panin, Nikolay Puzanov, Rinnat Safin and Gennadiy Tsygankov; footballers Lev Burchalkin, Valentin Fyodorov, Vladimir Kazachyonok, Nikolai Lyukshinov, Nikolai Sokolov and Yevgeni Yeliseyev. From the world of arts, painters Dmitry Belyaev, Pavel Filonov, Boris Lavrenko, Joseph Serebriany, and Nina Veselova; actors Glikeriya Bogdanova-Chesnokova, Aleksandr Demyanenko, Igor Dmitriev, Irina Gubanova, Pavel Kadochnikov, Nikolai Kryukov, Lev Lemke, Sergey Mikaelyan, Gennadiy Michurin, Antonina Shuranova, and Mikhail Svetin; dancers Boris Fenster, Alla Sizova, Yuri Soloviev and Sergei Vikharev; musicians Vitaly Bujanovsky, Boris Gutnikov and Yuri Morozov; and architect Iosif Langbard were all buried here. The parents of Vladimir Putin were also interred here, in 1998 and 1999.

Joint memorials commemorate the dead of various accidents and tragedies. As well as naval memorials, there are ones to those who died in the Siege of Leningrad, the Soviet–Afghan War, the Chernobyl disaster, an avalanche on Lenin Peak, in the Pamir Mountains, and the 1991 fire at the hotel Leningrad.

== Individuals ==
=== Military ===
| Image | Name | Born | Died | Occupation | Monument | Reference |
|---|---|---|---|---|---|---|
| | Pavel Abankin | 1902 | 1965 | Naval commander, admiral, Second World War, head of the Amur and Onega Flotillas, the Voroshilov Naval Academy, and the Hydrographic Service | | |
| | Giorgi Abashvili | 1910 | 1982 | Naval commander, vice-admiral, Winter War and World War II, deputy chief of staff of the Baltic Fleet | | |
| | Vladimir Alafuzov | 1900 | 1966 | Naval commander, admiral | | |
| | Leonid Belousov | 1909 | 1998 | Soviet flying ace, Hero of the Soviet Union | | |
| | Vladimir Frolov | 1967 | 2022 | Military officer, major-general | | |
| | Alexander Grigoryev | 1949 | 2008 | Security services official, KGB, FSB | | |
| | Vitaly Ivanov | 1935 | 2024 | Naval officer, admiral, commander of the Baltic Fleet, head of the Kuznetsov Naval Academy | | |
| | Anatoly Karelin | 1922 | 1974 | Pilot, Korean War flying ace, Hero of the Soviet Union | | |
| | Konstantin Kuznetsov | 1902 | 1977 | Naval officer, rear-admiral, submariner, head of the M. V. Frunze Higher Naval School, head of the Higher Naval School of Submarine Navigation. | | |
| | Gennady Lyachin | 1955 | 2000 | Naval officer, commanding officer of the Kursk at the time of her loss | | |
| | Nikolai Maydanov | 1956 | 2000 | Military officer, helicopter pilot, Hero of the Soviet Union, Hero of the Russian Federation | | |
| | Dmitry Medvedev | 1918 | 1992 | Soviet Air Force Lieutenant general, Hero of the Soviet Union, Second World War, Strategic Missile Troops | | |
| | Mikhail Mikhin | 1923 | 2007 | Pilot, Korean War flying ace, Hero of the Soviet Union | | |
| | Mikhail Motsak | 1949 | 2019 | Naval officer, vice-admiral, deputy commander and chief of staff of the Northern Fleet, Kursk submarine disaster search and salvage operations. Hero of the Russian Federation. | | |
| | Ivan Moshlyak | 1907 | 1981 | Major general, Hero of the Soviet Union, Soviet–Japanese border conflicts, Second World War. | | |
| | Aleksandr Oryol | 1908 | 1997 | Naval officer, admiral, Winter War and Second World War, commander of the Baltic Fleet and the Naval Academy | | |
| | Valentin Ponikarovsky | 1927 | 2009 | Naval officer, admiral, deputy commander in chief of the Black Sea and Northern Fleets, head of the Naval Academy | | |
| | Yuri Panteleyev | 1901 | 1983 | Naval officer, admiral, Winter War and Second World War, commander of the Pacific Fleet | | |
| | Vasily Savvin | 1939 | 2020 | Colonel general, Ministry of Internal Affairs, first commander of the Internal Troops of Russia | | |
| | Aleksandr Shabalin | 1914 | 1982 | Naval officer, twice Hero of the Soviet Union, Second World War, counter-admiral | | |
| | Emil Spiridonov | 1925 | 1981 | Naval officer, admiral, commander in chief of the Pacific Fleet | | |
| | Georgy Stepanov | 1890 | 1957 | Naval officer, vice-admiral, commander of the Onega and White Sea Military Flotillas | | |
| | Sergei Tiulpanov | 1901 | 1987 | Director of the Propaganda Administration of the Soviet Military Administration in Germany | | |
| | Viktor Vasilyev | 1887 | 1961 | Naval officer, rear-admiral, academic of the Naval Academy | | |
| | Nikolai Yegipko | 1903 | 1985 | Naval officer, vice-admiral, Hero of the Soviet Union | | |
| | Vasily Yeryomin | 1943 | 2020 | Naval officer, deputy commander in chief of the Russian Navy, head of the Kuznetsov Naval Academy | | |
| | Ivan Yumashev | 1895 | 1972 | Naval officer, admiral, Hero of the Soviet Union, Commander-in-Chief of the Soviet Naval Forces | | |
| | Mikhail Zakharov | 1912 | 1978 | Naval officer, admiral, Second World War | | |

=== Sport ===
| Image | Name | Born | Died | Occupation | Monument | Reference |
|---|---|---|---|---|---|---|
| | Konstantin Aseev | 1960 | 2004 | Chess grandmaster, trained Maya Chiburdanidze, Andrei Kharlov and Evgeny Alekseev | | |
| | Valentin Boreyko | 1933 | 2012 | Olympic rower, 1960 Summer Olympics and 1964 Summer Olympics. | | |
| | Lev Burchalkin | 1939 | 2004 | Football player and coach, Zenit Leningrad, USSR | | |
| | Valentin Bystrov | 1929 | 2017 | Hockey player, coach, sports referee, and teacher | | |
| | Fyodor Datlin | 1880 | 1941 | Figure skater, World Championships, Russian Championships, Soviet Championships | | |
| | Valentin Fyodorov | 1911 | 1981 | Football player and coach, FC Dynamo Leningrad | | |
| | Vladimir Kazachyonok | 1952 | 2017 | Football player and coach, FC Zenit Saint Petersburg | | |
| | Nikolai Lyukshinov | 1915 | 2010 | Football player and coach, FC Zenit Leningrad, FC Dynamo Leningrad | | |
| | Boris Matveyev | 1929 | 1968 | Athletics, discus throw. 1952 Summer Olympics, 1956 Summer Olympics | | |
| | Igor Novikov | 1929 | 2007 | Olympic Modern pentathlete 1956 Summer Olympics, 1960 Summer Olympics, 1964 Summer Olympics | | |
| | Nikolai Panin | 1872 | 1956 | Olympic figure skater and coach, 1908 Summer Olympics | | |
| | Nikolay Puzanov | 1938 | 2008 | Biathlete, 1968 Winter Olympics | | |
| | Anatoly Roshchin | 1932 | 2016 | Heavyweight Greco-Roman wrestler nine Olympic and World Championship medals | | |
| | Rinnat Safin | 1940 | 2014 | Biathlete, 1972 Winter Olympics | | |
| | Aleksandr Safronov | 1952 | 1989 | Speed skater. 1976 Winter Olympics, World Championships | | |
| | Lidia Selikhova | 1922 | 2003 | Speed skater. World Championships | | |
| | Rashid Sharafetdinov | 1943 | 2012 | Long-distance runner, 1968 Summer Olympics, 1972 Summer Olympics | | |
| | Natalya Smirnitskaya | 1927 | 2004 | Track and field athlete, javelin throw. World record twice in 1949, 1950 European Athletics Championships, 1949 World Festival of Youth and Students. Two-time national champion. | | |
| | Nikolai Sokolov | 1897 | 1988 | Football player, FC Dynamo Leningrad, USSR | | |
| | Gennadiy Tsygankov | 1947 | 2006 | Olympic ice hockey player and coach, 1972 Winter Olympics, 1976 Winter Olympics | | |
| | Yevgeni Yeliseyev | 1909 | 1999 | Football player and coach, FC Dinamo Minsk | | |

=== Arts ===
| Image | Name | Born | Died | Occupation | Monument | Reference |
|---|---|---|---|---|---|---|
| | Dmitry Belyaev | 1921 | 2007 | Painter, Honored Artist of the Russian Federation, member of the Leningrad Union of Soviet Artists, representative of the Leningrad School of Painting. | | |
| | Glikeriya Bogdanova-Chesnokova | 1904 | 1983 | Musical comedy theatre and film actress, People's Artist of the RSFSR. | | |
| | Vitaly Bujanovsky | 1928 | 1993 | Classical horn player, music teacher and composer, Leningrad Philharmonic Orchestra, Leningrad Conservatory | | |
| | Aleksandr Demyanenko | 1937 | 1999 | Film and theatre actor, People's Artist of the RSFSR, Operation Y and Shurik's Other Adventures | | |
| | Igor Dmitriev | 1927 | 2008 | Film and theatre actor, People's Artist of the RSFSR, Hamlet | | |
| | Boris Fenster | 1916 | 1960 | Dancer, choreographer and ballet master, Maly Theatre, Kirov Ballet | | |
| | Pavel Filonov | 1883 | 1941 | Avant-garde painter, art theorist, and poet, Soyuz Molodyozhi | | |
| | Irina Gubanova | 1940 | 2000 | Ballerina and film actress, War and Peace, Battle of Moscow | | |
| | Boris Gutnikov | 1931 | 1986 | Violinist, 1957 Long-Thibaud Competition, 1962 International Tchaikovsky Competition, Leningrad Conservatory | | |
| | Pavel Kadochnikov | 1915 | 1988 | Actor, film director, screenwriter. Ivan the Terrible, three times Stalin Prize winner, People's Artist of the USSR, Hero of Socialist Labour | | |
| | Alexander Khochinsky | 1944 | 1998 | Stage and film actor, bard. The Woman who Sings, The General, Honored Artist of the RSFSR | | |
| | Natalia Krandievskaya | 1888 | 1963 | Poet and memoirist | | |
| | Nikolai Kryukov | 1915 | 1993 | Film and theatre actor, Honored Artist of the RSFSR, The Andromeda Nebula | | |
| | Boris Lavrenko | 1920 | 2001 | Realist painter, People's Artist of the Russian Federation, Leningrad Institute of Painting, Sculpture and Architecture, representative of Leningrad School of Painting | | |
| | Iosif Langbard | 1882 | 1951 | Architect and Honored Artist of the Byelorussian SSR, St. Petersburg Academy of Arts, Byelorussian Theater of Opera and Ballet | | |
| | Lev Lemke | 1931 | 1996 | Actor, Merited Artist of the Russian Federation, Leningrad Comedy Theatre | | |
| | Sergey Mikaelyan | 1923 | 2016 | Film director, winner USSR State Prize (1976), Vlyublyon po sobstvennomu zhelaniyu (1983) | | |
| | Gennadiy Michurin | 1897 | 1970 | Stage and film actor, The Poet and the Tsar (1927), An Ardent Heart (1953) | | |
| | Yuri Morozov | 1948 | 2006 | Rock musician, multi-instrumentalist, sound engineer and composer | | |
| | Varvara Myasnikova | 1900 | 1978 | Actress, The Parisian Cobbler, Cinderella, Mumu | | |
| | Joseph Serebriany | 1907 | 1979 | Painter and stage decorator, Leningrad Union of Artists, People's Artist of the Russian Federation, Repin Institute of Arts, Leningrad School of Painting | | |
| | Antonina Shuranova | 1936 | 2003 | Stage, television and film actress, People's Artist of the RSFSR, An Unfinished Piece for Mechanical Piano | | |
| | Alla Sizova | 1939 | 2014 | Ballet dancer, Kirov Ballet | | |
| | Yuri Soloviev | 1940 | 1977 | Premier danseur, Kirov Ballet | | |
| | Mikhail Svetin | 1929 | 2015 | Actor, She with a Broom, He in a Black Hat | | |
| | Yefim Uchitel | 1913 | 1988 | Cameraman, director and screenwriter of documentary films, People's Artist of the USSR | | |
| | Nina Veselova | 1922 | 1960 | Realist painter, graphic artist, Leningrad Union of Artists, Leningrad School of Painting | | |
| | Sergei Vikharev | 1962 | 2017 | Ballet dancer, choreographer, Mariinsky Ballet | | |
| | Ivan Vladimirov | 1870 | 1947 | Painter and graphic artist | | |
| | Aleksey Zhivotov | 1904 | 1964 | Composer and music teacher | | |

=== Sciences ===
| Image | Name | Born | Died | Occupation | Monument | Reference |
|---|---|---|---|---|---|---|
| | Antonina Borissova | 1903 | 1917 | Botanist, specialising in the flora of the deserts and semi-desert of central Asia | | |
| | Mikhail Budyko | 1920 | 2001 | Climatologist, one of the founders of physical climatology, author of Heat Balance of the Earth's Surface (1956) | | |
| | Alexey Bystrow | 1899 | 1959 | Paleontologist, anatomist, and histologist. Namesake of Cape Bystrova and Bystrowiana | | |
| | Ekaterina Czerniakowska | 1892 | 1942 | Botanist and taxonomist of higher plants | | |
| | Andrey Fedorov | 1908 | 1987 | Biologist, botanist, taxonomist and phytogeographer | | |
| | Boris Fedtschenko | 1872 | 1947 | Plant pathologist and botanist, head botanist at the Saint Petersburg Botanical Garden | | |
| | Grigorii Fikhtengol'ts | 1888 | 1959 | Mathematician, real analysis, functional analysis | | |
| | Lev Fink | 1910 | 1988 | Physicist | | |
| | Alexander Freiman | 1879 | 1968 | Philologist, Iranist | | |
| | Iosif Geilman | 1923 | 2010 | Sign language expert, developer and interpreter. Founder and first director of the first All-Russian Educational Center for the Deaf. Gestuno. | | |
| | Nikolai Girenko | 1940 | 2004 | Ethnologist and human rights activist, director of the Kunstkamera. | | |
| | Mikhail Gurevich | 1893 | 1976 | Aircraft designer, Mikoyan Gurevich Design Bureau | | |
| | Moisey Kirpicznikov | 1913 | 1995 | Botanist | | |
| | Yevgeny Korotkevich | 1918 | 1994 | Scientist and polar explorer, Hero of Socialist Labour, Soviet Antarctic Expedition, Russian Geographical Society | | |
| | Sergey Kravkov | 1894 | 1942 | Hydrographer and Arctic explorer, First World War | | |
| | Afrikan Krishtofovich | 1885 | 1953 | Paleobotanist, fossil hunter specializing in Mesozoic flora. Author of Geological review of the countries of the Far East (1932) | | |
| | Nikolai Kudryavtsev | 1893 | 1971 | Petroleum geologist, founding father of modern abiogenic theory | | |
| | Dmitry Machinsky | 1937 | 2012 | Archaeologist, Hermitage Museum. Excavations of Lyubsha and Viking settlements along the Volkhov River | | |
| | Yeleazar Meletinsky | 1918 | 2005 | Folklorist, philologist, theory of narrative. Director of the Institute for Advanced Studies in the Humanities at Russian State University for the Humanities | | |
| | Ivan Meshchaninov | 1883 | 1967 | Linguist and ethnographer, Peter the Great Museum of Anthropology and Ethnography | | |
| | Ivan Novopokrovskiy | 1880 | 1951 | Botanist, specialist in botanical geography and systematics of higher plants | | |
| | Konstantin Petrzhak | 1907 | 1988 | Nuclear physicist, professor of physics Saint Petersburg State University, spontaneous fission of uranium | | |
| | Ilya Petrushevsky | 1898 | 1977 | Orientalist, Honored Scientist of the USSR, Institute of Oriental Studies of the Russian Academy of Sciences | | |
| | Georgy Pigulevsky | 1888 | 1964 | Organic chemist, specializing in natural product chemistry, terpene compounds | | |
| | Nina Pigulevskaya | 1894 | 1970 | Historian and orientalist. Institute of Oriental Studies of the Russian Academy of Sciences, Saint Petersburg State University, vice president of the Imperial Orthodox Palestine Society | | |
| | Mikhail Popov | 1893 | 1955 | Botanist, hybridization in plant evolution, Popoviocodonia | | |
| | Anatoly Riabinin | 1874 | 1942 | Geologist and vertebrate paleontologist, Riabininohadros, Amurosaurus, Batrachognathus, Mandschurosaurus | | |
| | Nikolai Schipczinsky | 1886 | 1955 | Botanist and taxonomist, director of the Saint Petersburg Botanical Garden | | |
| | Boris Schischkin | 1886 | 1963 | Botanist, Leningrad University, Schischkinia | | |
| | Pavel Serebrovsky | 1888 | 1942 | Ornithologist, biogeographer, and paleontologist | | |
| | Igor Shiklomanov | 1939 | 2010 | Hydrologist, Director of the Russian State Hydrological Institute, Academician of the Russian Academy of Natural Sciences, Honored Scientist of the Russian Federation. 2006 Tyler Prize for Environmental Achievement. | | |
| | Ruslan Skrynnikov | 1931 | 2009 | Historian, Ivan the Terrible, Time of Troubles | | |
| | Aleksandr Stackelberg | 1897 | 1975 | Entomologist, Zoological Museum | | |
| | Joseph Starik | 1902 | 1964 | Radiochemist, studies of ionic and colloidal forms of radionuclides in ultra-diluted solutions. Corresponding member of the USSR Academy of Sciences, three times winner of the Stalin Prize | | |
| | Vasily Struve | 1889 | 1965 | Orientalist | | |
| | Evgenii Wulff | 1885 | 1941 | Biologist, botanist and plant geographer | | |
| | Lev Zinder | 1904 | 1995 | Linguist, specialist in German philology | | |

=== Politics and business ===
| Image | Name | Born | Died | Occupation | Monument | Reference |
|---|---|---|---|---|---|---|
| | Marina Salye | 1934 | 2012 | Geologist and politician, Congress of People's Deputies of the RSFSR, People's Freedom Party | | |
| | Yury Shutov | 1946 | 2014 | Politician, investigated Anatoly Sobchak, Vladimir Putin | | |
| | Roman Tsepov | 1962 | 2004 | Businessman, confidant to Vladimir Putin | | |
| | Lev Zaykov | 1923 | 2002 | Politician, Member of the Politburo of the CPSU Central Committee, and secretary of the CPSU Central Committee | | |

== Group memorials ==
| Monument | Event | Year |
|---|---|---|
| | To the citizens and defenders of Leningrad who died in the Siege of Leningrad | 1941–1944 |
| | To the firefighters killed in the Hotel Leningrad fire | 1991 |
| | To the dead of the 1981 Pushkin Tu-104 crash | 1981 |
| | To those who died in the sinking of the Mekhanik Tarasov | 1982 |
| | To the soldiers who died in the Soviet–Afghan War | 1979–1989 |
| | To those who died in the Chernobyl disaster | 1986 |
| | To those who died in the sinking of the Polessk | 1993 |
| | To the sailors and officers who died in the loss of the submarine Kursk | 2000 |
| | To the sailors and officers who died in the loss of the submarine Komsomolets | 1989 |
| | To the mountaineers who died in an avalanche on Lenin Peak, Pamir Mountains | 1990 |
