= Serafimovskoe Cemetery =

Cemetery in Saint Petersburg, Russia

- Серафимовское кладбище
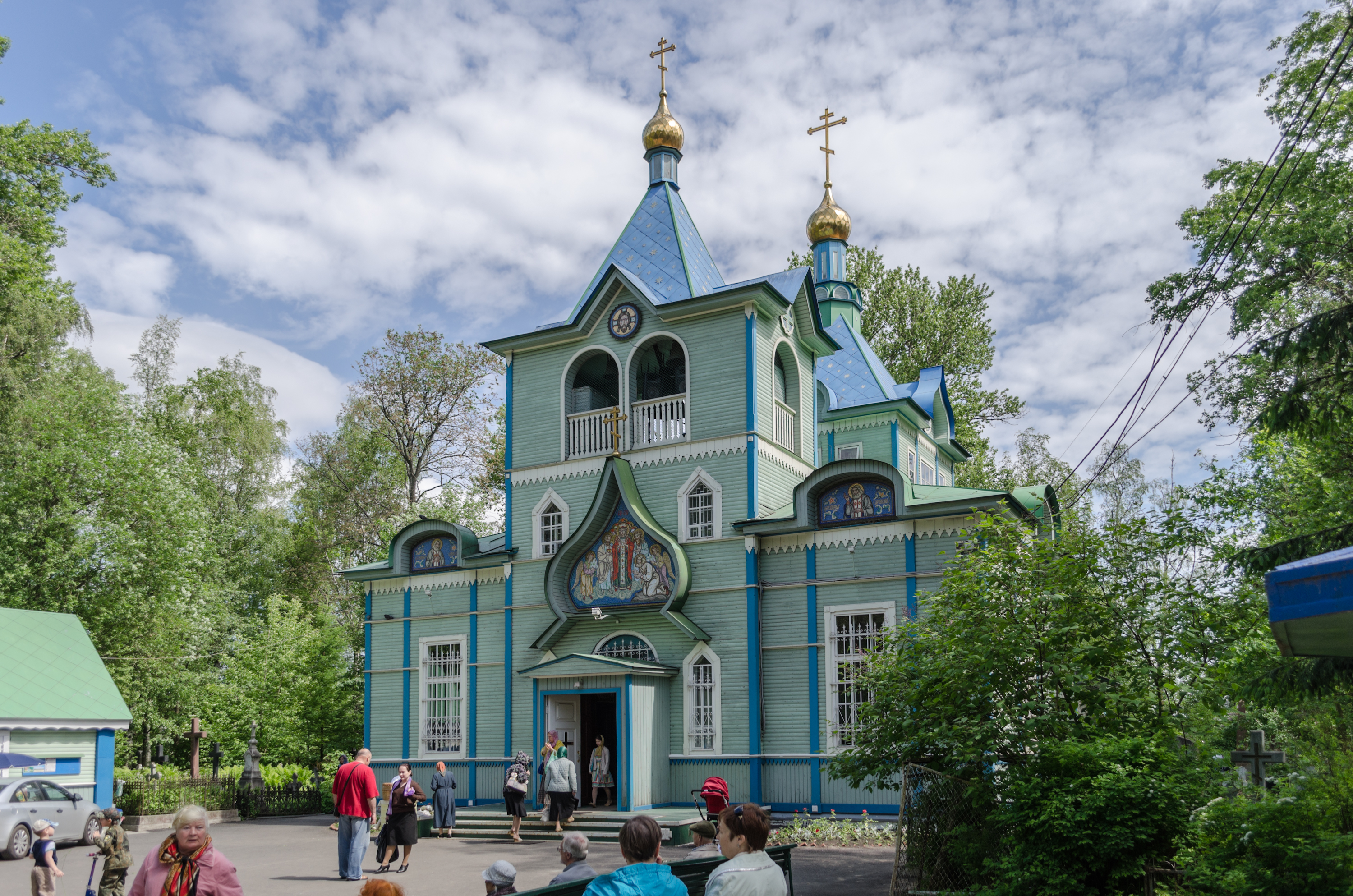
- The Church of Seraphim of Sarov in the Serafimovskoe Cemetery
- Interactive map of Serafimovskoe Cemetery

Details
- Established: 1905
- Location: Saint Petersburg
- Country: Russia
- Coordinates: 59°59′39″N 30°15′55″E

Serafimovskoe Cemetery (Russian: Серафимовское кладбище) is a historic cemetery in northwestern Saint Petersburg, in Primorsky District.

It was established to meet the need for the growing population in the early twentieth century. The first burial took place in 1905, and the cemetery church, the Church of Seraphim of Sarov in the Serafimovskoe Cemetery, was consecrated in 1907. The cemetery was primarily a burial place for the poor, until the Second World War. During the siege of Leningrad, from 1941 to 1944, it was one of the main sites for burying those who were killed, or died of cold or starvation. At least 100,000 people were buried during this period, mostly in mass graves.

The cemetery expanded after the war, and today covers 59 hectares. It contains the graves of a wide range of society, including military figures, and prominent people from the arts, sciences and sports.

== History ==
By the late nineteenth century population growth in the Staraya Derevnya area, formerly on the outskirts of the city, was putting pressure on the existing cemeteries. The local clergy approached the Spiritual Consistory with a request to establish a new cemetery on church land. The Consistory passed the case to the Holy Synod, which approved a decree on 23 June 1903, setting aside 27 dessiatins for this purpose. The Provincial Office gave their permission, and a plot of land was set aside, initially a bare field behind railway tracks. The plot was fenced, drained and divided into eight sections, with the prices for graves ranging from three to forty rubles. The first burial at the cemetery took place on 28 May 1905. Burials in the pre-revolutionary period included opera singer Aleksandr Lyarov and early aviator Nikolai Kostin.

Funds were solicited in early 1905 for the construction of the cemetery church, with the Holy Synod advancing a loan of fifty thousand rubles, repayable over 10 years. A construction commission was established in early 1906, and on 25 July the foundation stone of the church was laid. The church was built in eighty-seven days to a design by Nikolai Nikonov, and was consecrated on 1 March 1907 for its namesake Seraphim of Sarov, who had been canonized in the summer of 1903. Initially the cemetery was primarily a burial place for poor people, as well as soldiers and sailors who died in the First World War. The church remained open during the Soviet period, because of the "proletarian" background of those buried in the cemetery. During the Second World War the cemetery became a burial place for those who died during the siege of Leningrad. By one calculation one hundred thousand people were buried at the cemetery during the siege, though the true figure may perhaps be two or three times higher. The dead were buried in mass graves, often trenches that had been blasted out of the frozen ground with explosives during winter. When the siege was lifted the bells of the church rang for two days, the first time they had been heard since the Soviet government banned bell ringing in 1933.

After the war the cemetery became one of the main burial locations for the city, and expanded significantly, eventually covering fifty nine hectares, and today is mostly full, with most interments being in existing family plots. New burials generally take place in the northern part of the cemetery. A new chapel, to Saint George, was built in 1999, the first stone being laid on 15 February 1999, the 10th anniversary of the withdrawal of Soviet troops from Afghanistan. It opened that same year on 2 August, the Day of the Airborne Forces, opposite the Afghan War memorial, itself inaugurated in 1996, sponsored by the veterans' association Afganvet. Nataliya Danilova, of the University of Aberdeen, writes that "The unique character of the Cemetery is its ability to function as a place for both public commemoration and private grief." She notes that "from the 1990s onwards, the Serafimovskoe Cemetery has functioned as a major regional site for military commemoration."

== Memorials ==
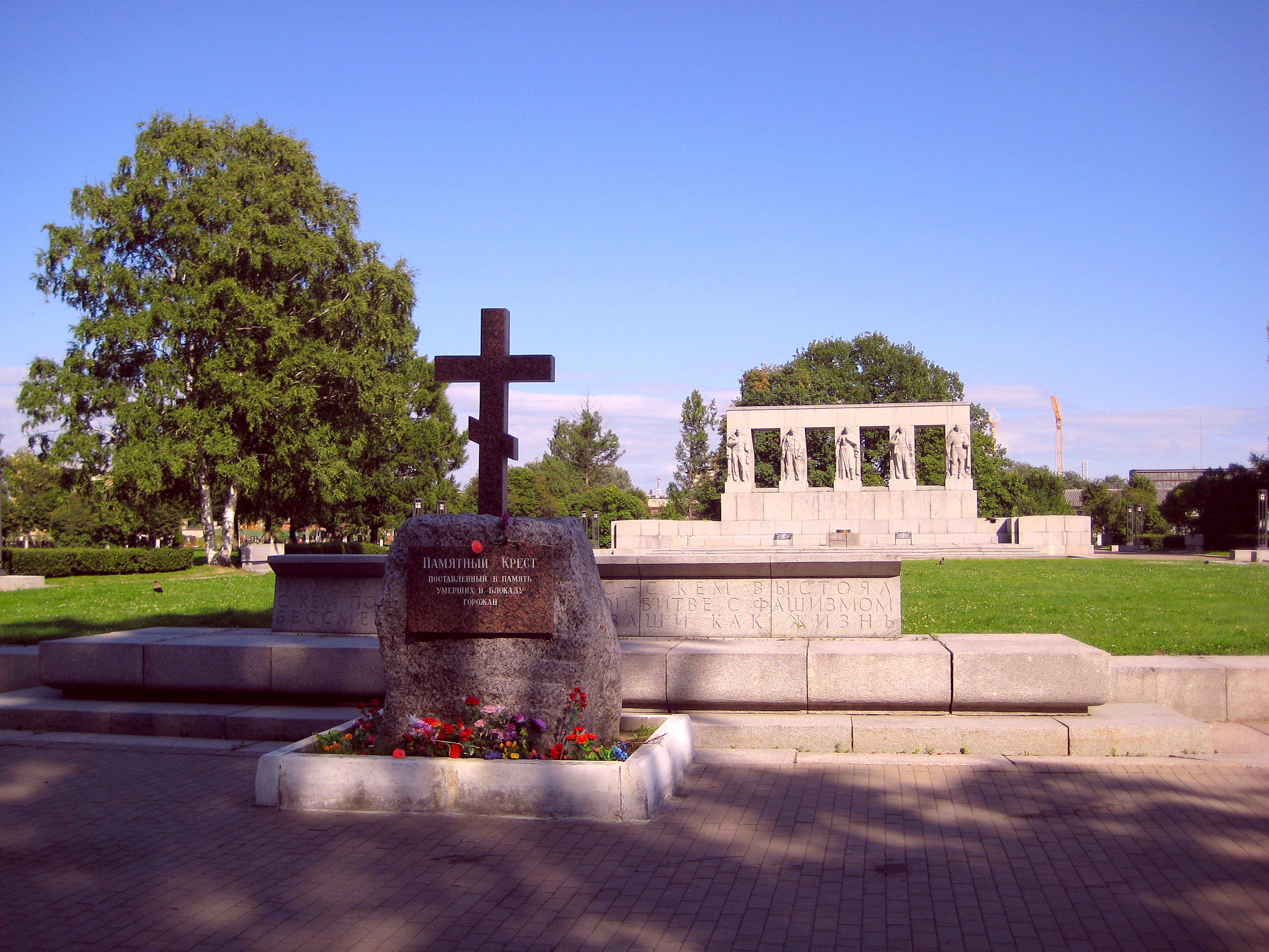
The memorial to those who died in the Siege of Leningrad

A memorial to the victims of the siege was opened the right of the main cemetery entrance on 27 January 1965, the 21st anniversary of the lifting of the siege. A four-span portico sits on a high base, with five monumental sculptures depicting the defenders and workers of Leningrad. In front of the portico is a granite cube with an eternal flame and a platform paved with black labradorite. It stands on the site of sixteen mass graves from the time of the siege. The Piskaryovskoye Memorial Cemetery is the usual place for the main commemorations of the siege, with the Seraphimovskoe Cemetery often commemorating other military events, including Victory Day on 9 May, the anniversary of the withdrawal from Afghanistan (15 February), the deaths of troops from the 76th Guards Air Assault Division in the Battle for Height 776 during the Second Chechen War (1 March), the Day of the Airborne Forces (2 August) and the foundation of the OMON (4 October).

The cemetery contains many monuments dedicated to naval officers and professors of the Naval Academy. The few surviving graves from the pre-war period are located along one of the alleys, and include nuns and novices of the St. John Convent on the Karpovka River. Another section holds a number of graves of physicians and employees of the 1st Leningrad Medical Institute. There are also a number of communal war graves of soldiers of the Second World War, marked by white obelisks. A number of Heroes of the Soviet Union are also interred in the cemetery, among whom; Boris Alekseyev, Nikolai Archakov, Ivan Afanasyev, Anton Gurin, Pavel Pavlov, Ivan Yumashev, and Fyodor Simakov.

There are memorials to the dead of several tragedies, including the 1981 Pushkin Tu-104 crash, and the loss of the ships Mekhanik Tarasov in 1982, Polessk in 1993, and Kursk in 2000. There are also memorials to the mountaineers who died in an avalanche on Lenin Peak in 1990, the firefighters who died in the 1991 fire at the hotel Leningrad and the dead of the Soviet–Afghan War. On 6 July 2019 the fourteen men who died in a fire aboard the submarine Losharik were interred in the cemetery.

== Interments ==
Those buried at the Serafimovskoe Cemetery include naval officers Giorgi Abashvili, Vladimir Alafuzov, Ivan Yumashev, and Mikhail Zakharov. Other military figures interred in the cemetery include Soviet Air Force Lieutenant General Dmitry Alexandrovich Medvedev, two flying aces of the Korean War, Anatoly Karelin and Mikhail Mikhin, and Major General Sergei Ivanovich Tiulpanov, who commanded the Propaganda Administration of the Soviet Military Administration in Germany.

Numerous sportspeople have also been buried here, among whom; Olympians Valentin Boreyko, Igor Novikov, Nikolai Panin, Nikolay Puzanov, Rinnat Safin and Gennadiy Tsygankov; and footballers Lev Burchalkin, Valentin Fyodorov, Vladimir Kazachyonok, Nikolai Lyukshinov, Nikolai Sokolov and Yevgeni Yeliseyev. From the world of arts, painters Dmitry Belyaev, Pavel Filonov, Boris Lavrenko, Joseph Serebriany, and Nina Veselova, actors Glikeriya Bogdanova-Chesnokova, Aleksandr Demyanenko, Igor Dmitriev, Irina Gubanova, Pavel Kadochnikov, Nikolai Kryukov, Lev Lemke, Sergey Mikaelyan, Gennadiy Michurin, Antonina Shuranova, and Mikhail Svetin; dancers Boris Fenster, Alla Sizova, Yuri Soloviev and Sergei Vikharev; musicians Vitaly Bujanovsky, Boris Gutnikov and Yuri Morozov; and architect Iosif Langbard were all buried here. The parents of Vladimir Putin were also interred here, in 1998 and 1999.
