= Highlandeurs =

The Highlandeurs were an ancient tribe located northwest of modern-day Baku, identified by researchers as Caucasian Huns.

The Highlandeurs may be one of the designations for the Caucasian Xionites. The Xhionites were a self-name of the Hephthalites, and the Hephthalites were considered to be part of the Massagetae tribes. According to Elishe, the king of the Highlandeurs was called "Heran". Borovkova L. A. identifies the Highlandurs with the Massagetae. Gutnov F. wrote that one of the Huns from the country of the Highlandurs was called "Bel". Procopius said that Egan was a descendant of the Massagetae, who were once called Huns.

== History ==
The question of the Highlandeurs was first raised by Josef Markwart. Believing that Elhishe’s text referred to the Caucasian Huns, he compared the Armenian historian's accounts with data from Priscus of Panium, concluding that the Highlandeurs were the "royal" horde of the Huns.

Mikhail Artamonov however, argued that the Highlandeurs were North Caucasian Huns and had no connection to Attila’s Huns in Pannonia, whom Markwart had in mind as the primary "royal" horde.

According to Nina Pigulevskaya, the Huns who broke through the Caucasian Range in the 4th century maintained all their positions in the North Caucasus through the mid-5th century. These groups of Hunnic tribes participated in the struggle of Transcaucasian peoples against Iran during the reign of Yazdegerd II.

An explanation for the word Highlandeur was offered by B. Ulubabyan, who posited that it is a Celtic word meaning "mountain dweller" — highlandeur, similar to how residents of the mountainous regions of Scotland still call themselves "Highland."
