= Georgy Stepanov =

Soviet naval officer (1890-1957)

Georgy Andreyevich Stepanov
- Born: 30 November [O.S. 18 November] 1890; Kronstadt, Saint Petersburg Governorate, Russian Empire
- Died: 3 January 1957 (aged 66) Leningrad, Soviet Union
- Buried: Serafimovskoe Cemetery
- Allegiance: Russian Empire; Soviet Union
- Branch: Imperial Russian Navy; Soviet Navy
- Service years: 1908–1953
- Rank: Vice-Admiral
- Commands: Onega Military Flotilla; Black Sea Fleet; White Sea Military Flotilla
- Awards: Russian Empire: Order of Saint Stanislaus Third Class; Order of Saint Anna Third and Fourth Class; Order of Saint Vladimir Fourth Class; Order of St. George Fourth Class; Soviet Union: Order of Lenin; Order of the Red Banner (four times); Order of Nakhimov First Class; Foreign Awards: Order of Brotherhood and Unity (Socialist Federal Republic of Yugoslavia)

Georgy Andreyevich Stepanov (Russian: Георгий Андреевич Степанов) (30 November [O.S. 18 November] 1890 – 3 January 1957) was an officer of the Soviet Navy. He rose to the rank of vice-admiral and was commander of the Onega and White Sea Military Flotillas, as well as acting-commander of the Black Sea Fleet.

Born into a naval dynasty, Stepanov embarked on a career in the Imperial Russian Navy, serving as a torpedo officer with the Baltic Fleet during the First World War. He continued his naval career after the Russian Revolution, siding with the Bolsheviks during the Russian Civil War, taking part in the Ice Cruise of the Baltic Fleet and then commanding the Onega Military Flotilla, seeing action against the White Finns. He then served in staff positions with the Black Sea Fleet, interspersed with courses at the Naval Academy. He graduated to a teaching post at the Academy and after serving as senior director, and department head, became head of the Academy itself. Recalled to seagoing service with the German invasion of the Soviet Union, Stepanov was appointed to command the White Sea Military Flotilla, an important task that required protecting the Arctic convoys. Recalled to Moscow he was appointed acting head of the Main Naval Staff, but came in for criticism after losses in the Black Sea, and was demoted for a period.

Returning to academia after the war, he was attached to the Naval Academy once more, until 1948, when he and several fellow officers were convicted of passing secrets to Britain and the US during the war years. Stepanov was imprisoned for a time, but was fully rehabilitated after the death of Stalin. He returned to academic life, and died in 1957. He had received a number of awards from both the Tsarist and Soviet governments over his long career.

== Family and early life ==
Stepanov was born into a noble dvoryan family on 30 November [O.S. 18 November] 1890 in Kronstadt, Saint Petersburg Governorate, in the Russian Empire. His grandfather was a retired captain 1st rank, while his father, Andrei Ivanovich Stepanov, was an officer of the Imperial Russian Navy, and served as a torpedo officer on the cruiser Rurik, and later as a senior torpedo officer aboard the battleship Andrei Pervozvanny. He reached captain 2nd rank, and was killed at the Battle of Tsushima in 1905 while commanding the transport Kamchatka. Stepanov's uncle, Konstantin Ivanovich Stepanov, was also a naval officer, rising to captain 1st rank and commanding the cruiser Admiral Makarov.

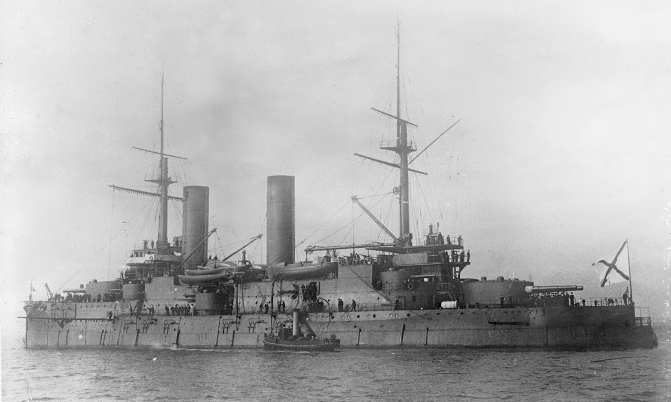
The battleship Slava, Stepanov's ship from February 1916 to March 1917

Stepanov followed his relatives into the navy, studying at the Alexander Cadet Corps from 1905 to 1907, while also joining the Marine Corps in 1905. His naval service began in 1908, though he completed his time in the Marine Corps in 1911. From 1911 to 1912 he served on the training ship Nikolaev as a watch officer. He took specialised classes in torpedo warfare and radio telegraphy from 1912 to 1914. In 1913 he was appointed junior torpedo officer on the battleship Andrei Pervozvanny, and was serving in this post at the outbreak of the First World War. From February 1916 he was senior torpedo officer of the battleship Slava, and from March 1917 to September 1918 served as the torpedo officer at the headquarters of the Baltic Fleet's patrol division.

== Early Soviet service ==
Stepanov supported the Bolsheviks after the October Revolution, and continued to serve in the Workers' and Peasants' Red Navy. Between February and May 1918 he participated in the Ice Cruise of the Baltic Fleet, the evacuation of the fleet's ships from Tallinn (Reval) and Helsinki to Kronstadt. From September 1918 to March 1919 Stepanov commanded the minelayer Sheksna, and from March 1919 to March 1920, he served as Chief of Staff of the Onega Military Flotilla. In March 1920 he was briefly acting commander of the flotilla, and saw action against the White Finns on Lake Onega. In May 1920 he became chief of staff of the Black Sea Fleet's marine detachment, temporarily serving as chief of the West Black Sea coast defence sector, between Ochakov and Odessa, from June to August 1921. From August 1921 to December 1924 Stepanov was Chief of the Operational Directorate of the Naval Staff, and from December 1924 to October 1925 Chief of Staff of the Black Sea Fleet.

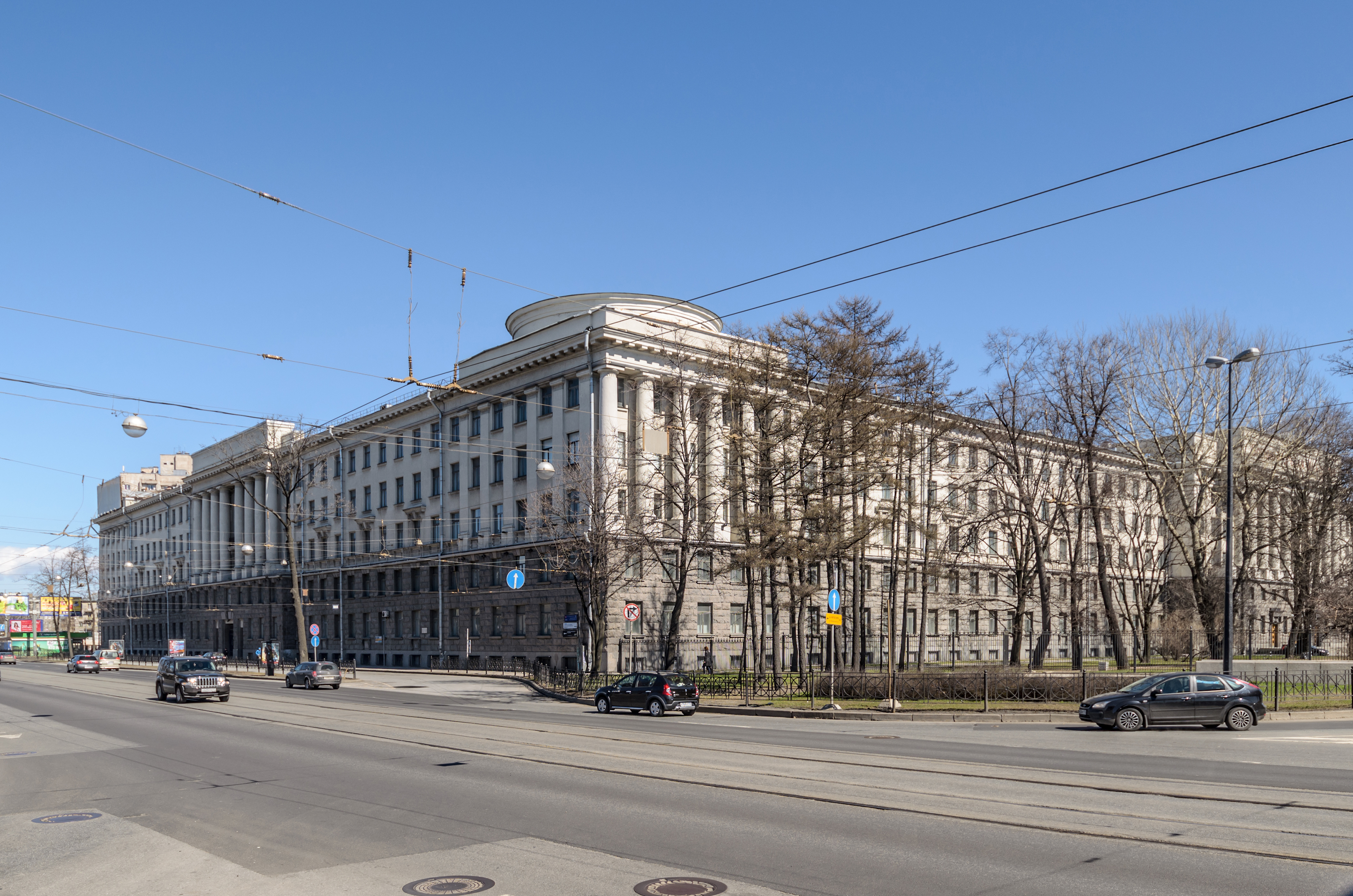
The Naval Academy, where Stepanov studied, taught, and eventually became head of.

From October 1925 Stepanov studied the Higher Naval Academic Courses at the Naval Academy, graduating in April 1926. He returned to the post of Chief of Staff of the Black Sea Fleet, was briefly acting commander of the Black Sea Fleet from January to March 1928, and then left to take up a post teaching at the Naval Academy. Over the next decade he held a number of positions at the Academy, including teacher, senior director, and department head, before becoming head of the Academy itself, as well as the head of Naval Engineering and Technical Academy, in September 1939. On 4 June 1940 he was advanced to the rank of vice admiral.

== World War II ==
With the German invasion of the Soviet Union, Stepanov was appointed to command the White Sea Military Flotilla on 7 October 1941. During his tenure he prepared the defences of the northern ports and installations, as well as the access points through the Yugorsky and Kara Straits. He also arranged escorts for the Arctic convoys and kept open the lines of communication in the Arctic waters. On 6 March 1943 he was recalled to Moscow and was appointed acting head of the Main Naval Staff. He was among those involved in accusations of the "unsatisfactory organization" of the Black Sea Fleet, following the sinking of the destroyers Kharkov, Besposhchadny and Sposobny by German aircraft off the Crimean coast on 6 October 1943. On 2 March 1944 the State Defence Committee directed that Stepanov be removed from office and demoted to the rank of rear admiral. He was restored to the rank of vice admiral on 1 June 1944, and from July 1944 served as Head of the Directorate of Naval Educational Institutions, continuing in his post after the war.

== Postwar ==
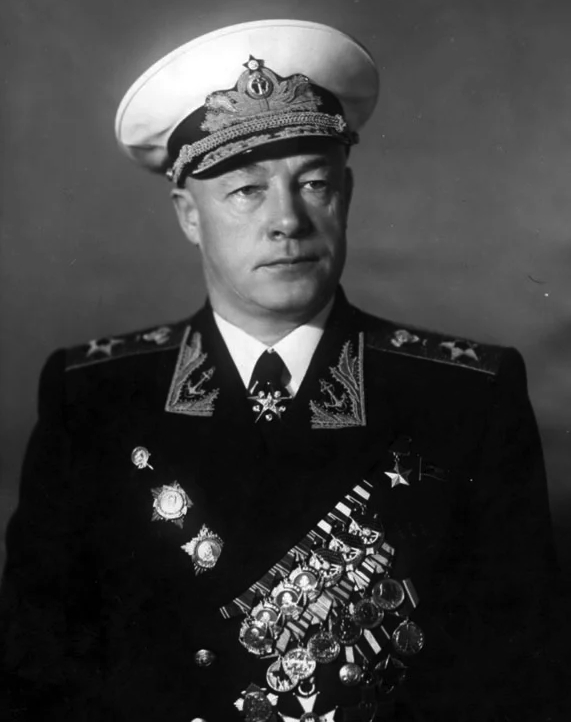
Nikolay Kuznetsov, former commander in chief of the navy, and one of Stepanov's fellow defendants at the 1948 trial

Stepanov returned to the Naval Academy in April 1947, serving as head of its Organization and Mobilization Department until November 1947. On 12 January 1948 Stepanov, with fellow naval officers Nikolay Kuznetsov, Lev Galler and Vladimir Alafuzov were brought before the Court of Honour of the Ministry of the Armed Forces of the USSR, chaired by Marshal Leonid Govorov. They were accused of having passed technical secrets to Britain and the United States during the war years. Found guilty by the court, the verdict was passed to the Military Collegium of the Supreme Court of the Soviet Union, which on 3 February 1948 convicted them of the charges. Stepanov was sentenced to 10 years in prison, and on 10 February 1948 his rank of vice-admiral was revoked by the Council of Ministers of the Soviet Union. On 13 May 1953, shortly after the death of Stalin, Stepanov was fully rehabilitated and reinstated in his former rank as vice-admiral.

Largely retired from active sea-going service, Stepanov returned to academia. From June 1953 he was a member of the editorial board and editor-in-chief of the 3rd volume of the Military Historical Sea Atlas. He died in Leningrad on 3 January 1957, and was buried in the Serafimovskoe Cemetery. Over his period of service he had received awards from both the Tsarist and Soviet governments. For service in the Imperial Russian Navy Stepanov was awarded the Order of Saint Stanislaus Third Class, the Order of Saint Anna Third and Fourth Class, the Order of Saint Vladimir Fourth Class and the Order of St. George Fourth Class. The Soviets awarded him the Order of Lenin in 1944, the Order of the Red Banner four times, in 1921, 1943, 1944, and 1947, the Order of Nakhimov First Class in 1944, and the medals "For the Victory over Germany in the Great Patriotic War 1941–1945" and "For the Victory over Japan" in 1945 and 1946 respectively. He also received the Socialist Federal Republic of Yugoslavia's Order of Brotherhood and Unity First Class in 1946.
