= Vasily Yeryomin =

Russian naval officer

Vasily Petrovich Yeryomin
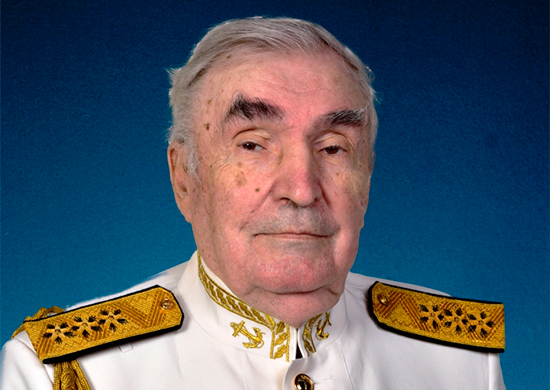
- Born: 2 January 1943; Nashchekino, Bondarsky District, Tambov Oblast, Russian SFSR, Soviet Union
- Died: 30 June 2020 (aged 77) Saint Petersburg, Russia
- Buried: Serafimovskoe Cemetery
- Allegiance: Soviet Union; Russia
- Branch: Soviet Navy; Russian Navy
- Service years: 1962-2003
- Rank: Admiral
- Commands: Kuznetsov Naval Academy
- Awards: Order of Military Merit; Order of the Red Star; Order "For Service to the Homeland in the Armed Forces of the USSR" Second and Third Classes

Vasily Petrovich Yeryomin (Russian: Василий Петрович Ерёмин; 2 January 1943 — 30 June 2020) was an officer of the Soviet and Russian Navies. He reached the rank of admiral, and served as a deputy commander in chief of the Russian Navy between 1992 and 1995, and head of the Kuznetsov Naval Academy from 1995 to 2003.

== Biography ==
Yeryomin was born on 2 January 1943 in the village of Nashchekino, Bondarsky District, Tambov Oblast, in what was then the Russian Soviet Federative Socialist Republic, in the Soviet Union. He graduated from the Institute of Water Management Engineers in 1960 and spent a year working at the Tambov Chemical Plant. He moved to Leningrad and entered the Kronstadt Maritime School, graduating with honours and enrolling at the Frunze Higher Naval School in Leningrad in 1962. He graduated, again with honours, in 1967. On being assigned to the fleet he was made commander of an anti-aircraft battery aboard the Kotlin-class destroyer Naporisty, but by October 1967, he was commander of the mine-torpedo department of the Kashin-class destroyer Soobrazitelny, in the Black Sea Fleet's 21st Anti-Submarine Ship Brigade.

Yeryomin took the Higher Special Officer Classes of the Navy between 1971 and September 1972, returning to take up the post of assistant commander of the Sverdlov-class training cruiser Dzerzhinsky. This was followed by the posts of executive officer of the destroyer Komsomolets Ukrainy from January 1974, and then her commander from December 1974. Komsomolets Ukrainy was at this time also part of the 21st Anti-Submarine Ship Brigade. He took two years of study at the Grechko Naval Academy between 1977 and June 1979. From 1979, he was chief of staff, and then from July 1983, commander of the 150th Missile Ship Brigade. In October 1984, he was appointed commander of the Black Sea Fleet's 30th Surface Ship Division.

Yeryomin studied at the Voroshilov Military Academy of the General Staff between 1987 and 1989, and on graduating, was appointed in June 1989 to command the Northern Fleet's 7th Operational Squadron. He held this post until October 1991, when he became first deputy commander of the Northern Fleet. He was in this role during the dissolution of the Soviet Union and the force's transition from a Soviet to a Russian one. In 1991 he was promoted to vice-admiral, and became deputy Commander-in-Chief of the Russian Navy in September 1992. He was promoted to admiral in 1994, served as deputy commander until September 1995, when he was appointed head of the Kuznetsov Naval Academy. In 2000 he co-authored the monograph Naval Education in Russia. He retired in 2003. Yeryomin died in Saint Petersburg on 30 June 2020, at the age of 77. He was buried in the city's Serafimovskoe Cemetery on 2 July 2020.

== Honours and awards ==
Over his career Yeryomin received the Order of Military Merit in 1996, the Order of the Red Star in 1991, the Order "For Service to the Homeland in the Armed Forces of the USSR" third class in 1975 and second class in 1985, and various other medals. He also received personalized weapons in 1993, and 2002. He was a candidate of military sciences from 1999, with the title of professor from 2002.
