= Leonid Georgievich Belousov =

Soviet flying ace (1909–1998)

Major Leonid Georgievich Belousov
- Native name: Леони́д Гео́ргиевич Белоу́сов
- Born: 16 March 1909; Odessa, Russian Empire
- Died: 7 May 1998 (aged 89) Saint Petersburg, Russia
- Buried: Serafimovskoe Cemetery
- Allegiance: Soviet Union
- Branch: Soviet Navy
- Rank: Major
- Conflicts: Russian Civil War; World War II; Winter War; Great Patriotic War; Road of Life
- Awards: Hero of the Soviet Union

Major Leonid Georgievich Belousov (Russian: Леони́д Гео́ргиевич Белоу́сов; 16 March 1909 – 7 May 1998) was a Soviet flying ace who served throughout World War II, even after both of his legs had to be amputated due to injuries.

== Early life ==
Belousov was born in Odessa on 16 March 1909. As a teenager he would run away from home, becoming a homeless child. At the age of 13, Belousov became a pupil of the 51st Rifle Division, assisting them during the Russian Civil War.

He joined the Soviet Navy in 1932 as a member of the Communist Party of the Soviet Union. In 1935 he graduated from the aviation school in Borisoglebsk as a pilot.

== World War II ==
In 1938 Belousov, serving as a naval pilot, suffered an accident in which he was badly burned. He was ordered to lead a group to intercept a foreign aircraft that violated the USSR's borders, but would get into an accident that resulted in the burn. After the treatment, which ultimately included 32 plastic surgeries, he returned to military service and continued to fly. He would go on to fight for the entirety of the Winter War. For his service in the war, Belousov received the Order of the Red Banner.

During the blockade of Leningrad, of the Great Patriotic War, Belousov defended the Road of Life over the Lake Ladoga. In December 1941, Belousov lost both of his legs due injury and freezing, which induced gangrene. He would have prosthetics fitted at the Leningrad Research Institute for Prosthetics, and after a year of rehabilitation returned to piloting. In 1944 he returned to combat, due in part to the simple design of U-2 plane. After returning to the skies for the last year of the war, he would shoot down one additional plane.

Belousov served as Commander of the Ganguttsev squadron, and was recognized as an ace fighter pilot of the Red Army. By the end of the war he was a guard major and totaled over 300 sorties.

== Later life ==
In 1957 Belousov was awarded the order of the Hero of the Soviet Union.

Belousov died on 7 May 1998 in Saint Petersburg, Russia, where he had retired. He was buried in the city's Serafimovskoe Cemetery.

== Publicity ==
Belousov actions would earn him public acclaim in the Soviet Union, with Pravda highlighting his heroic deeds and inspirational story.

Later, Belousov would write a short series of memoirs about his life, selling over 100 thousand copies. It was 64 pages and was titled Веление долга.

Belousov's friend Mikhail Dudin, a Soviet poet and fellow Ganguttsev veteran, wrote a poem about Belousov titled Eyes of L. Belousov.

A street in Saint Petersburg was renamed in Belousov's honor.

== See also ==
- Aleksey Maresyev
- Zakhar Sorokin
