= Ekaterina Chernyakovskaya =

Russian botanist (1892–1942)

Yekaterina Georgievna Chernyakovskaya, née Reineke (Екатерина Георгиевна Рейнеке-Черняковская; Ekaterina Georgiewna Reineke-Czerniakowska; 1892–1942) was a Soviet botanist and taxonomist of higher plants.

== Biography ==
She was born in 1892 in the city of Konin, Kalisz Governorate of the Russian Empire, now Poland.

She graduated from the Higher Women's Natural Science courses. Since 1913, she worked as an employee of the Imperial Botanical Garden (now the Botanical Garden of Peter the Great).

In 1924, she participated in an expedition to the Turkmen Oblast, and in 1924–1925, she was on an expedition to Persia.

She lived in Leningrad on the 11th line of Vasilievsky Island, house 42, and also on Pesochnaya Street, house 1/2. She worked in the Herbarium of the Botanical Institute of the Russian Academy of Sciences. During the Siege of Leningrad, she remained in besieged Leningrad. The herbarium collections were not evacuated, but the most valuable objects were moved to the basement; some of the collections were packed and prepared for possible evacuation.

She died in 1942 during the siege from dystrophy. She was buried in the Serafimovskoe Cemetery.

== Accomplishments ==
Czerniakowska published the names of at least 69 plants. The standard author abbreviation Czerniak. is used to indicate this person as the author when citing a botanical name.

== Archives at the Russian Academy of Sciences ==
- Czerniakowska E. G. Khorasan and Seistan (botanical and agronomic essay of Eastern Persia) / / Proceedings on applied botany, genetics and breeding, vol. XXIII. – 1930.
- Czerniakowska E. G. Genus krasodnev Hemerocallis L / / Flora of the USSR. M-L: 1935.
- Czerniakowska E. G. Essay on the vegetation of Kopet-dag / / Izvestiya Glavnogo Botanic Garden of the USSR. — 1927. – Vol. 26. – Issue 2. – pp. 253–266.
- Czerniakowska E. G. Genus 260. Timeless autumnal Colchicum (Tourn.) L / / Flora of the USSR : in 30 t. / gl. ed. V. L. Komarov — – L.: USSR Academy of Sciences Publishing House, 1935. – Vol. 4 / ed. vol. V. L. Komarov. – p. 23–31 — – 760, XXX p — 5175 экз.
- Czerniakowska E. G. Genus Katran-Crambe (Tourn.) L / / Flora of the USSR. – M.-P. 474–491.
- Czerniakowska E. G. Spring vegetation of the Kara-Kalpinsky district / / Izvestiya Glavnogo Botanic Garden. – 1925. – Vol. 23. – no. 2.

== Plant species named after Czerniakowska ==
- Cousinia czerniakowskae, Kult.
- Dactylorhiza czerniakowskae, Aver.
- Matthiola czerniakowskae, Botsch & Vved.
- Pyrethrum czerniakowskae, Krasch ex Czerniak.
- Veronica czerniakowskiana, Monjuschko — Veronica Czerniakowska
