= Georgy Pigulevsky =

Russian chemist

Georgy Vasilyevich Pigulevsky
- Born: 10 December [O.S. 28 November] 1888; Kovno, Russian Empire
- Died: September 19, 1964 (aged 75); Leningrad, USSR
- Education: Saint Petersburg Imperial University
- Scientific career
- Fields: Chemistry, Biochemistry
- Workplaces: Leningrad State University

Georgy Vasilyevich Pigulevsky (Russian: Георгий Васильевич Пигулевский; 10 December [O.S. 28 November] 1888 – 19 September 1964) was a soviet organic chemist, specializing in natural product chemistry. He studied essential oils and resins of plants, as well as terpene compounds extracted from them.

== Life ==
G.V. Pigulevsky was born on December 10, 1888 (November 28, old style) in Kovno (nowadays Kaunas, Lithuania) in the family of a lawyer Vasily Ivanovich Pigulevsky. There were two other sons in the family - Boris and Vladimir. In 1906, after graduating from the Vilna Gymnasium, he entered the Faculty of Physics and Mathematics of the Saint Petersburg Imperial University. After graduation in 1911, he stayed at the Department of Chemistry at the suggestion of Professor L.A. Chugaev. Since 1912 he simultaneously became a laboratory assistant in the Agricultural Scientific Committee of the Ministry of Agriculture, in 1914-23 he worked as a scientific specialist of the same committee. At the same time, he lectured at the Psychoneurological Institute (1914–1918). In 1919, he taught analytical chemistry at the Women's Medical Institute.

In 1920 Pigulevsky became a lecturer (since 1929 - associate professor) at Petrograd University (later - Leningrad State University). In 1924–1928, he worked as the head of the laboratory of labor protection of the People's Commissariat for Labour of the North-Western Region. In 1929, Pigulevsky was elected as a professor of the Institute of Chemical Technology. In the same year, he headed the Department of fats and oils of this institute (1929–1930). In 1931–1934 while continuing to teach at Leningrad State University, Pigulevsky headed the Department of Organic Chemistry at the Arkhangelsk Forestry Engineering Institute. In 1934, he became a professor of organic chemistry at Leningrad State University. At the same time, he headed the laboratory of bioproducts of this University. In 1935, he obtained Doctor of Science in chemistry degree without thesis defense.

In 1941–1942, as a part of a group of chemists Pigulevsky organized the production of medicines (streptocide, phenamine, glucose, sulfidine and sulfazol) in besieged Leningrad. In the summer of 1942, he was evacuated to Kazan. In 1942-1943, he served as a senior researcher at the I.P. Pavlov Physiological Institute of the Academy of Sciences of the USSR. In 1943, Pigulevsky accepted an invitation to head the biochemical laboratory of the V.L. Komarov Botanical Institute and led it until the end of his life. In 1944, Pigulevsky returned to Leningrad.

After coming back to Leningrad, he again headed the laboratory of bioproducts at Leningrad State University. In 1957, this laboratory was reorganized as the problematic laboratory of natural compounds of the Faculty of Chemistry of the Leningrad State University. Pigulevsky headed it until the end of his life. He died in 1964 in Leningrad.

== Scientific career ==
In his first scientific works carried out under the guidance of Chugaev, Pigulevsky studied the chemistry of terpenes. Subsequently, essential oils and resins of coniferous plants became the main subject of his research. In addition to studying their formation and reactions, Pigulevsky also studied the optical properties of terpene compounds isolated from these oils. A number of articles were devoted to direct studies of plant materials from which essential oils and resins were extracted. His research of essential oils were of great practical importance, some of the substances discovered by Pigulevsky were applied in the perfume industry.

An important part of his research was the study of vegetable fats. Pigulevsky discovered the correlation between the degree of unsaturation of fats and the climate in which plants grew. Some of his works were devoted to the chemical properties of unsaturated acids.

In 1937, Pigulevsky was one of the first organic chemists in the USSR who began using the phenomenon of Raman scattering of light (the Raman effect) to study the physical properties of organic substances. By 1961, large number of Raman spectra had been collected for compounds found in essential oils of coniferous plants.

While working as the head of the laboratory of the labor protection department of the People's Commissariat of Labour, Pigulevsky published a number of works on the use of various devices in industry, as well as on the identification of harmful substances in the air.

== Other activities ==
Pedagogical work was an important part of the life of Pigulevsky. From 1911 to 1964, with a break for the duration of the war, he taught at Leningrad State University and lectured at other universities and institutes. During this time, he read many lecture courses: “Fats and oils”, “About derivatives of aliphatic terpenes”, “Resins”, “Terpenes”, “Essential oils”, etc.

Pigulevsky was a member of the Academic Council of the Leningrad branch of the D.I. Mendeleev All-Union Chemical Society, as well as a member of the Central Council of the D.I. Mendeleev All-Union Chemical Society. In 1946-1947, he was a member of the editorial board of the journal "Sovietskaya Botanica". From 1937 until the end of his life, he was a member of the editorial committee of the Journal of Applied Chemistry of the USSR.

== Works ==
During his life, Pigulevsky became the author of more than 200 publications. He was the author of several monographs, including:

"Essential oils"

"Formation and transformation of essential oils and resins in conifers"

"Chemistry of Terpenes"

== Awards and prizes ==
1916 - A.M. Butlerov Small Prize of the Russian Physics and Chemistry Society (for the research on the composition of oil of plant species of the same family)

1953 - Order of Lenin

1954 - Prize of the D.I. Mendeleev All-Union Chemical Society

== Family ==
Pigulevsky was married to Nina Viktorovna Pigulevskaya (1894-1970), a soviet historian, corresponding member of the Academy of Sciences of the USSR, specialist in the history of Byzantium, the Near and Middle East in the early Middle Ages.
