= Lev Zinder =

Russian linguist (1903–1995)

Lev Rafailovich Zinder (8 January 1904 – 23 August 1995) was a Russian linguist in German philology.

== Biography ==
Lev Zinder was born in 1904 in Kiev. When he was eight, he entered the third gymnasium in Kiev, but finished only six forms and after that studied on his own to get the secondary education. From 1919 till 1923 he worked in Kiev Central Children library. In 1923 he entered Leningrad Institute of Political Education named after N.K. Krupskaya. In 1924 he was sent to study at the LGU (Leningrad State University) at Roman-Germanic department and finished it in 1928. After finishing the university he was offered the job of a lecturer of German language. Since January 1929 he was working as an assistant in the experimental phonetics laboratory. From 1932 till April 1938 he was the head of the foreign languages department at this university. In 1938 Lev Zinder defended dissertation in the topic of ”The Phonology of German language", after that he became PhD in philology and in January 1939 Lev Zinder was confirmed the scientific degree of assistant professor. At the beginning of World War II Lev Zinder went to the national militia, but he knew languages well and so he was taken as a translator in the spy department of the Leningrad Front. For the excellence in service Lev Zinder was rewarded with the Red Star Order and with the medal for Leningrad defense. After demobilization in October 1945 Lev Zinder returned to his work at the phonetics department of LGU. Since April 1946 he worked as a top scientific collaborator at the Institute of Language and Thinking, named after N.Y. Marra. The necessity to have new experts in linguistics that knew maths and physics brought Lev Zinder to the idea of opening a new department of Maths Linguistics. He became the first curator at this department. About 80 dissertation were written with Lev Zinder's tuition. Among his pupils there were the people of different former Soviet republics: Lithuania, Estonia, Ukraine, Azerbaijan, Kazakhstan, Uzbekistan. In 1995 Lev Zinder became consultant-professor having worked all his life at the university.

== Personal life ==
In 1932 Lev Zinder married Lidiya Aleksandrovna Kogan. In 1937 the son Vladimir Lvovich was born in November 1941 Anatoliy was born, but he died in evacuation having lived only some weeks. The family was in evacuation. Lidiya Aleksandrovna worked in hospital. With this hospital the family (without Lev Rafailovich) moved from town to town: Kirov, Sevetek, Vladimir. In 1944 they returned to Leningrad and Lev Zinder got the medal for Victory over Germany. From 1945 till 1995 Lev Zinder taught at Leningrad State University and on 23 August he died. He was buried at Serafimovskoe Cemetery.

== Famous scientific proceedings ==
Lev Rafailovich Zinder famous scientific proceedings:

- Historic phonetics. German language.
- Practical training of German language.
- Historic morphology.
- Theoretical course of phonetics of modern German language.
- General phonetics.
