= Vitaly Ivanov =

Russian naval officer

Vitaly Pavlovich Ivanov
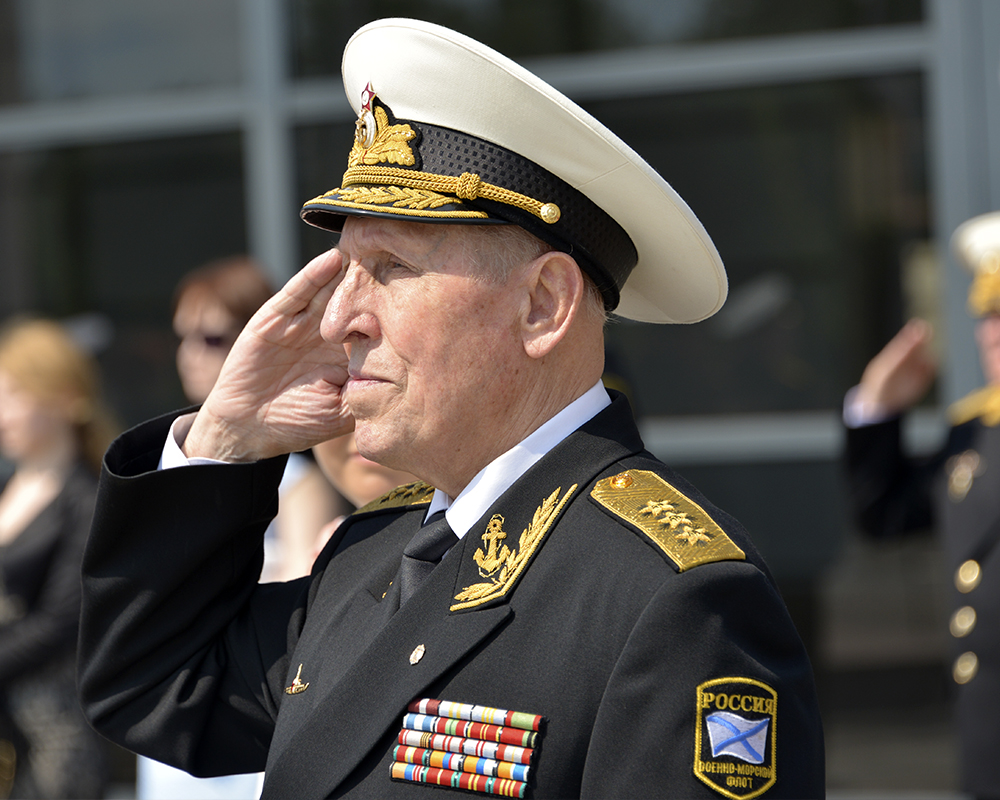
- Born: 12 August 1935; Poltava, Kharkiv Oblast, Ukrainian SSR, USSR
- Died: 27 October 2024 (aged 89) Saint Petersburg, Russia
- Buried: Serafimovskoe Cemetery
- Allegiance: Soviet Union; Russia
- Branch: Soviet Navy; Russian Navy
- Service years: 1952-1995
- Rank: Admiral
- Commands: Baltic Fleet; Kuznetsov Naval Academy
- Awards: Order of the Red Star; Order "For Service to the Homeland in the Armed Forces of the USSR" Second and Third Classes

Vitaly Pavlovich Ivanov (Russian: Виталий Павлович Иванов; 12 August 1935 — 27 October 2024) was an officer of the Soviet and later Russian Navy. He held the rank of admiral, and served as commander of the Baltic Fleet between 1985 and 1991, and as head of the Kuznetsov Naval Academy between 1991 and 1995.

== Biography ==
Ivanov was born on 12 August 1935 in the village of Poltava, Kharkiv Oblast, in what was then the Ukrainian Soviet Socialist Republic, in the Soviet Union. He completed seven years of secondary school, before entering the Saratov Naval Preparatory School in December 1950. He entered the Soviet Navy in August 1952, enrolling in the preparatory course of the 1st Baltic Higher Naval School of Submarine Navigation in Leningrad, and after successfully completing it, enrolled in the first year of the school in August 1953, graduating from the school in 1957. He was then posted to the Northern Fleet, where he served as a torpedo group commander aboard the Whiskey-class submarine S-362, then head of the mine and torpedo crew of the submarine from December 1958. In February 1962, he was appointed assistant commander of the S-282, and then senior assistant commander on the submarine S-365. In 1964, Ivanov sailed with the submarine from the Arctic Ocean to the Pacific Fleet, where he deployed as part of the submarine brigade based at Magadan.

Ivanov returned to Leningrad in 1965 to enroll in the Higher Special Officer Classes of the Navy, graduating in 1966. He was then redeployed to the Pacific Fleet as executive officer of the submarine K-45, in the Kamchatka Flotilla's submarine squadron. After some time in this role, Ivanov was appointed to his first command in January 1969, that of the Victor I-class K-370, then under construction at the Admiralty Shipyards on the Baltic. Ivanov and his crew took over the ship in May 1970, sailing it to the Northern Fleet and remaining in command until 1972, when he enrolled for further study at the Naval Academy. He graduated from the academy with a gold medal in 1974, and in June 1974, was appointed deputy commander of the Northern Fleet's 17th Submarine Division. In August 1975, he was appointed to command the Division, promoted to rear-admiral on 28 October 1976, remaining in this role until 1977, when he attended the Voroshilov Military Academy of the General Staff, graduating in 1979. In June 1979, he was appointed first deputy commander of the Northern Fleet's 11th Submarine Flotilla, and then in July 1981, deputy chief of the Operations Directorate of the Naval General Staff. He became chief of the directorate in February 1982, and a deputy chief of the Naval General Staff, being promoted to vice-admiral on 18 February 1985.

In December 1985, Ivanov was appointed commander of the Baltic Fleet, promoted to admiral on 7 May 1987 and serving as such until October 1991, when he became head of the Kuznetsov Naval Academy. He was a deputy of the Supreme Soviet of the Soviet Union, and a member of its committee on defence and state security until 1991. He was head of the Naval Academy during the dissolution of the Soviet Union, transferring into the succeeding Russian Navy, until his retirement in December 1995. In retirement he settled in Saint Petersburg and remained working at the academy, receiving the title of professor in 2000. He was also an Honorary Academician of the Academy of Military Sciences from 1995, and First Deputy Chairman of the Saint Petersburg Naval Assembly from 1995 until 2021. Ivanov died in St George's Hospital on 27 October 2024, at the age of 89. He was buried in the city's Serafimovskoe Cemetery.

== Honours and awards ==
Over his career Ivanov received the Order of the Red Star, the Order "For Service to the Homeland in the Armed Forces of the USSR" second and third classes, and various other medals.
