= Sergei Vikharev =

Russian ballet dancer, choreographer and historian

- Born: 15 February 1962; Saint Petersburg, Russia, Soviet Union
- Died: 2 June 2017 (aged 55); Saint Petersburg, Russia
- Education: Vaganova Academy
- Known for: Ballet, Choreography

Sergei Vikharev (Russian: Сергей Геннадьевич Вихарев) (15 February 1962 – 2 June 2017) was a Russian ballet dancer, choreographer of reconstructions and historian.

== Biography ==
Sergei Vikharev was born in Saint Petersburg and trained at the Vaganova Academy of Russian Ballet. He graduated in 1980 and joined the Mariinsky Ballet after winning a prize in Varna at the International Ballet Competition. In 1985, he won a prize at an international ballet competition in Moscow and was promoted to principal in 1986.

His repertoire with the Mariinsky Ballet included leading roles in La Sylphide, Giselle, Napoli, The Naiad and the Fisherman, The Sleeping Beauty, the La Vivandière Pas de six, Paquita, Les Sylphides Petrushka, Carnaval and Symphony in C.

In 1999–2006, he was the chief ballet master of the Novosibirsk Opera and Ballet Theatre.

In 2002, he became an Honoured Artist of Russia.

== Reconstructions of Petipa's ballets ==
Although he was an accomplished dancer, Vikharev is perhaps most famous for his reconstructions of the ballets of Marius Petipa, a task he first accomplished in 1999 when at the suggestion of then-Mariinsky Ballet director Makhar Vaziev, he staged a reconstruction of Petipa's The Sleeping Beauty at the Mariinsky Theatre. For this reconstruction, Vikharev restored the original scenery and costume designs from the original 1890 production and restored Petipa's surviving choreography from the notation scores of the Sergeyev Collection, a collection that contains the notation scores for over twenty of Petipa's ballets. However, the reconstruction was met with hostility from the Mariinsky dancers and coaches, so much so that they refused to part with the Soviet passages they were familiar with, resulting in at least half of the Soviet passages being retained. Vikharev's reconstruction of The Sleeping Beauty was considered controversial in St Petersburg, but received a warmer reception in the West when it was taken on tour.

In 2002, Vikharev attempted his second reconstruction of Petipa's ballets when he staged La Bayadère for the Mariinsky Theatre, in which he restored the long-lost fourth act with the destruction of the temple. However, the production received the same hostility from the Mariinsky company that they had bestowed upon Vikharev's reconstruction of The Sleeping Beauty and as a result, at least 75% of the Soviet choreographic passages were retained in favour of the notated passages.

It was not until 2007 that his reconstructing of Petipa's ballets was finally met with success in Russia when he reconstructed Petipa's one-act ballet The Awakening of Flora, which had not been performed since 1919. Unlike his previous reconstructions, Vikharev's reconstruction of The Awakening of Flora was a success and it even won him a Golden Mask Award.

In 2009, Vikharev staged his fourth reconstruction at the Bolshoi Theatre when he reconstructed Petipa's final revival of Coppélia for the Bolshoi Ballet. In 2011, Vikharev was commissioned by Vaziev to reconstruct Petipa again, this time for the La Scala Ballet in Milan, where Vaziev was serving as artistic director at the time. For the La Scala Ballet, Vikharev reconstructed Petipa's Raymonda, which was released on DVD. In 2015, he reconstructed Petipa and Lev Ivanov's revival of La fille mal gardée at the Ekaterinburg State Academic Opera and Ballet Theatre.

== Death ==
On 2 June 2017, Vikharev attended a private dental clinic in Saint Petersburg to have a dental procedure, for which he was put under a general anesthetic. The drug used for the protocol was Propofol, but shortly after the anesthetic was administered, he lost consciousness and went into cardiac arrest. Despite the medical team's efforts to resuscitate him, he died before the ambulance arrived; he was 55 years old. His wake was held at the Mariinsky Theatre on June 8, which was attended by many of his family members, friends and colleagues, followed by his funeral; he was buried in the Serafimovskoe Cemetery.
