= Artyushino =

Artyushino Артюшино
- Village
- Location within Vladimir Oblast Location within Russia
- Coordinates: 55°59′N 40°14′E
- Country: Russia
- Region: Vladimir Oblast
- District: Sobinsky District
- Time zone: UTC+3:00

Artyushino (Russian: Артюшино) is a rural locality (a village) in Aserkhovskoye Rural Settlement, Sobinsky District, Vladimir Oblast, Russia. The population was 1 as of 2010.

== Geography ==
Artyushino is located 21 km east of Sobinka (the district's administrative centre) by road. Meshchera is the nearest rural locality.
