= Nikolay Lyukshinov =

Soviet Russian footballer and coach

Personal information
- Full name: Nikolay Mikhaylovich Lyukshinov
- Date of birth: 27 October 1915
- Place of birth: Artyushino, Kostroma Governorate, Russia
- Date of death: 18 March 2010 (aged 94)
- Place of death: St. Petersburg, Russia
- Position: Forward

Senior career*
Years	Team	Apps	(Gls)
1938–1941	ShVSM Leningrad		

Managerial career
- 1947–1948: FC Zenit Leningrad (assistant)
- 1954–1955: FC Zenit Leningrad
- 1956–1957: Albania
- 1956–1957: FK Partizani Tirana
- 1959–1961: Admiralteyets Leningrad
- 1962: FC Dynamo Leningrad
- * Club domestic league appearances and goals

Nikolay Mikhaylovich Lyukshinov (Russian: Николай Михайлович Люкшинов; 27 October 1915 – 18 March 2010) was a Soviet Russian football player and coach.
