= Glikeriya Bogdanova-Chesnokova =

Soviet musical comedy theatre and film actress

- Born: Glikeriya Vasilyevna Bogdanova-Chesnokova; 26 May 1904; Saint Petersburg, Russian Empire
- Died: 17 April 1983 (aged 78); Leningrad, Soviet Union
- Resting place: Serafimovskoe Cemetery
- Occupation: Actress
- Years active: 1924–1983

Glikeriya Vasilyevna Bogdanova-Chesnokova (Russian: Глике́рия Васи́льевна Богда́нова-Чесноко́ва; born 13 (26) May 1904 in Saint Petersburg – 17 April 1983 in Leningrad) was a Soviet and Russian stage and film actress. People's Artist of the RSFSR (1970).

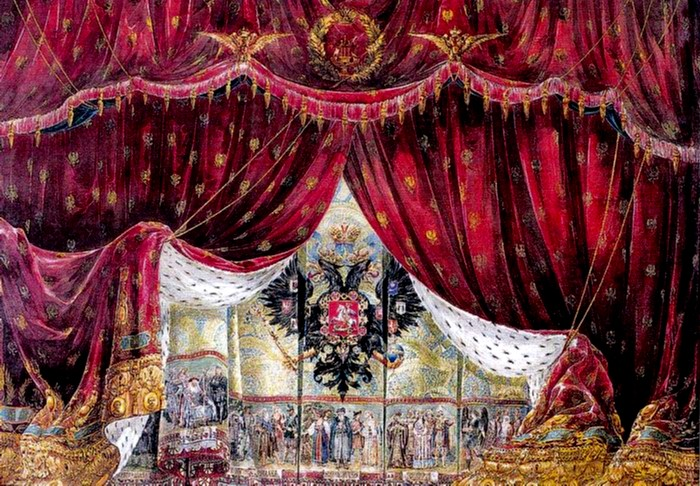
Drawing of the house curtain of the Imperial Mariinsky Theatre, St. Petersburg prior to 1914

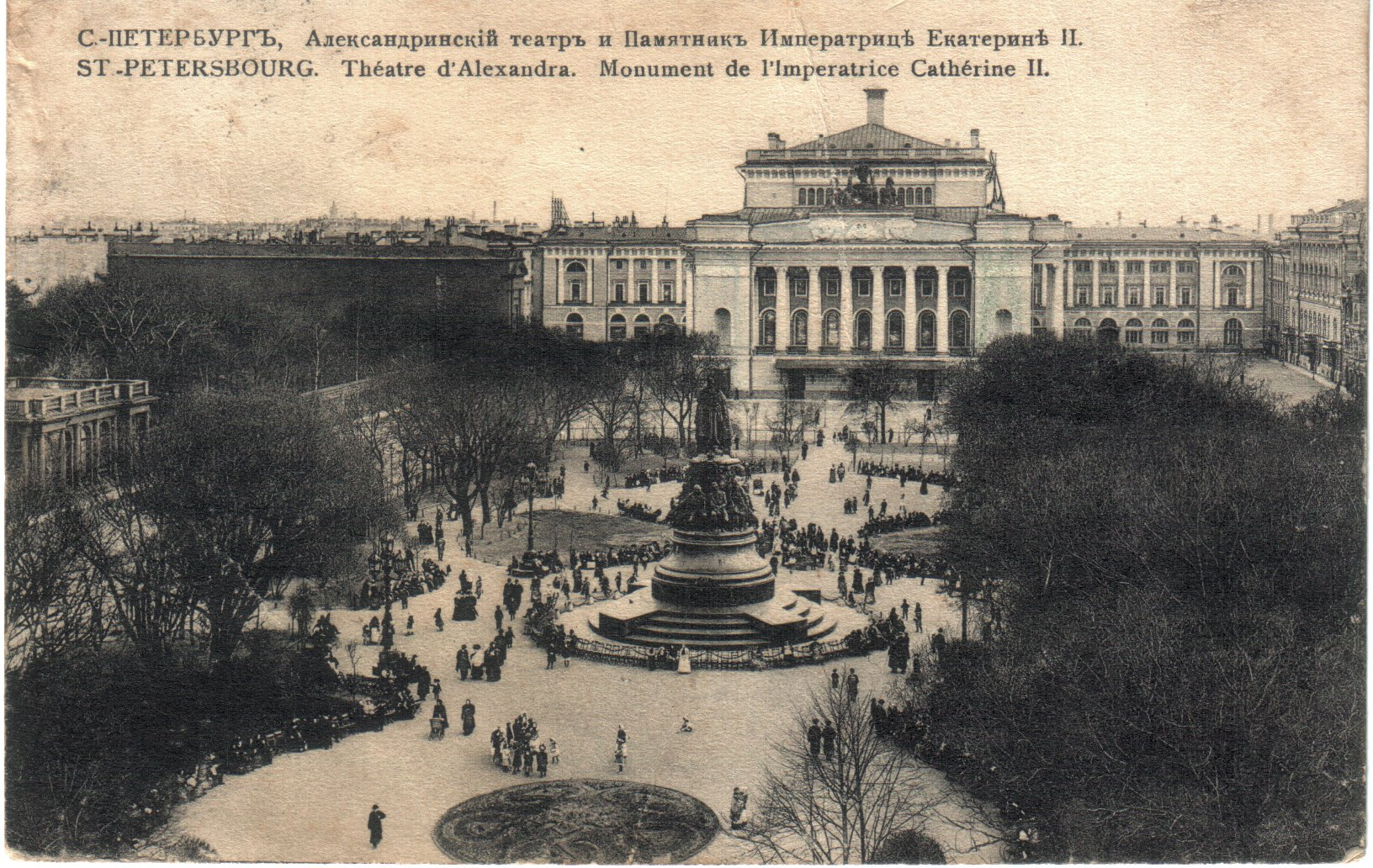
Postcard of the Alexandrinsky Theatre, St. Petersburg, 1917

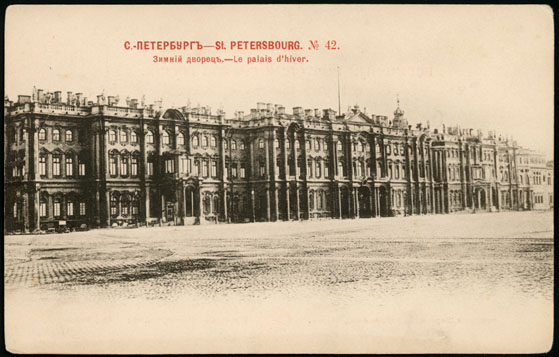
Winter Palace, St. Petersburg from Palace Square, 1900

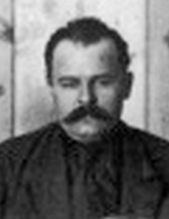
Aleksei Badayev in 1919

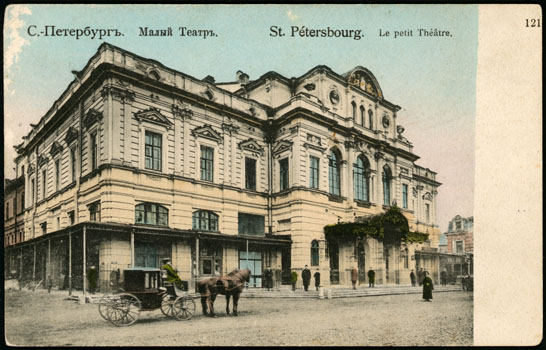
Tovstonogov Bolshoi Drama Theatre, early 1900s

== Family and early life ==
Bogdanova-Chesnokova's grandfather was a master inventor described as having "golden hands". In the mid 1800s, the railway to Vladivostok was being constructed through the Siberian village where the Bogdanov family lived. The chief foreman of the railroad construction told Bogdanova how much he admired his talent. The foreman suggested Bogdanova go to Saint Petersburg. Shortly after, Bogdanova moved with his family to the city. Bogdanova's inventions were soon compared with those of Ivan Kulibin (born Niznhy Novgorod 1735 – 1818). Bogdanov was welcomed into the city's mechanical workshops, and learned to operate trains.

On 13 May 1904, Bogdanova-Chesnokova was born in Saint Petersburg. After the October Revolution, calendar dates were shifted forward by thirteen days, making her legal date of birth the twenty-sixth. Her childhood nickname was "Lika". The Bogdanov family lived in a cottage in Vyborg. Bogdanova-Chesnokova had a brother and a sister. Her mother owned a sewing workshop, and was said to be "a well-read, sophisticated, young woman of refined taste, having a great sense of fashion". Bogdanova-Chesnokova was a student with a good memory (per the Russian saying, "a memory from God"). She was a good linguist (learning Chinese) and a mimic. Her mother took her to the theatre and Bogdanova-Chesnokova participated in the school theatre group. In early World War I, aged twelve, Bogdanova-Chesnokova entertained wounded soldiers. Her repertoire included Siberian folk tunes and some less than proper short songs such as "The beautiful Catherine walked along the street" and "Mommy, mommy, what will I do?"

== October revolution ==
Bogdanova-Chesnokova joined the Russian Social Democratic Labour Party, attending courses and assisting nurses. On 25 October (7 November) 1917, she was present at the assault of the Winter Palace during the October Revolution as a member of the Vyborg Side. Later, Bogdanova-Chesnokova described how wondrous she had found it to have unfettered access to the Winter Palace, the Hermitage, the Tsar's rooms and so on when she had worked in the part of the palace being used as a military hospital.

From 1917 to August 1919, a time of food shortages and hard times, Bogdanova-Chesnokova worked under Alexander Vermishev. Vermishev was a keen theatre-goer and organized, along with Aleksey Badaev, an independent theatre activity group. Vermishev was later killed in war.

At 16, Bogdanova-Chesnokova was employed as a typist at the Petrograd commune ("Petrocommune"). She worked under Badayev who was the "First Foodstuff Commissar of Petrograd and Northern Region". During this time, Bogdanova-Chesnokova continued to sing and to attend the theatre.

== Theatrical education ==
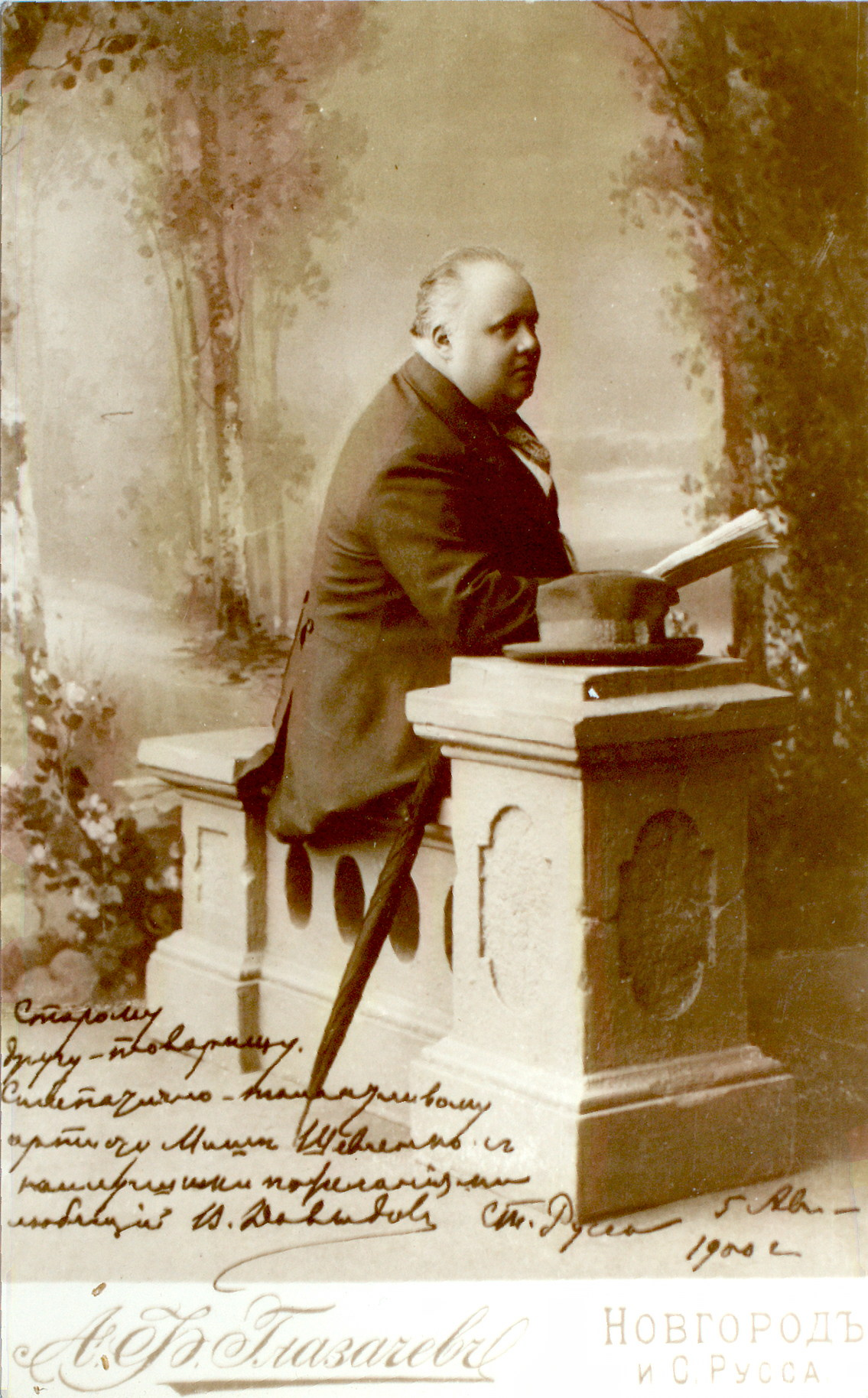
Vladimir Davydov, late 1917

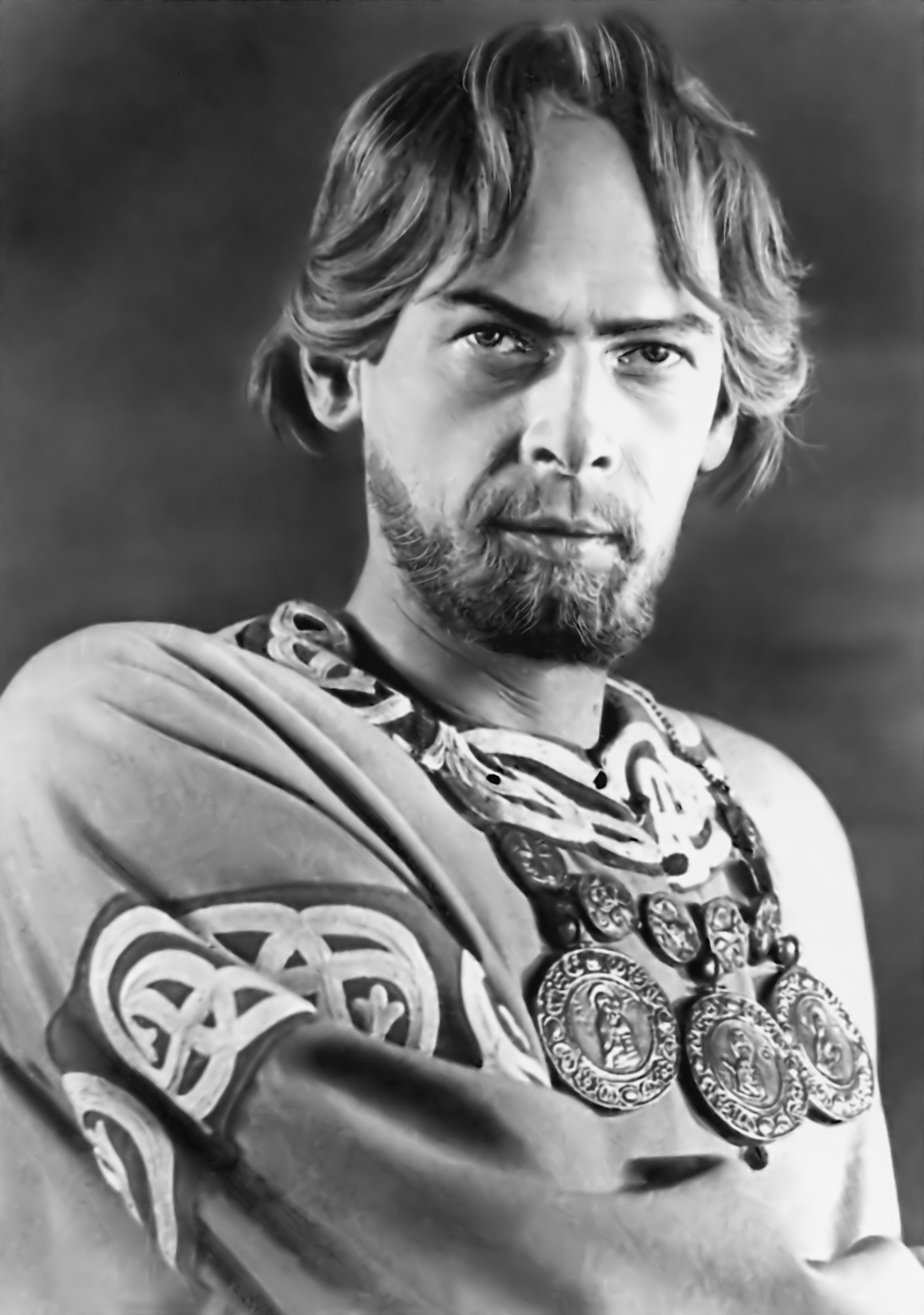
Nikolai Cherkasov in 1938

On Badayev's recommendation, Bogdanova-Chesnokova joined the Russian Drama School at the Alexandrinsky Theatre headed by Sofronov and Vera Michurina-Samoilova. In her audition, before Yuriy Mikhailovich Yuriyev, Bogdanova-Chesnokova sang and read a monologue of Plyushkin from the "Dead Souls" of Nikolai Gogol. Bogdanova-Chesnokova was accepted and joined the class of the actor, V. N. Davydov.

Other actors who attended the Russian Drama School include Mikhail Tsaryov, Nikolay Cherkasov, Yuri Tolubeyev, Nikolay Simonov, Aleksandr Borisov, Yelizaveta Uvarova, Boris Chirkov, Konstantin Adashevskiy and Vasili Merkuryev. It was at the Russian Drama School that Bogdanova-Chesnokova met Nikolay Cherkasov.

In 1921, the New Economic Policy (NEP) brought new opportunities for actors. Provincial theatrical troupes came into Petrograd and performed in the gardens and parks. Simultaneously, many theatres appeared in the city. By chance, Bogdanova-Chesnokova met Dmitry Fyodorovich Vasilchikov, a singer and actor of the theatre troupe of Nicholai Nikolayevich Sinelnikov. Sinelnikov was a provincial actor, stage manager and entrepreneur and his theatre presented tragedies, dramas, vaudevilles, operettas and ballets. Bogdanova-Chesnokova was invited to join the troupe and tour with them. She did so and in 1922, she married Vasilchikov. That year, Bogdanova-Chesnokova had a daughter, Lida.

In 1924, Bogdanova-Chesnokova completed her studies at the Russian Drama School. Also in 1924, she made her debut at the Alexandrinsky Theatre in the role of "Lucille" in Le Bourgeois gentilhomme by Molière.

== Petrozavodsk ==
In 1927, Bogdanova-Chesnokova joined Vasilchikov at the Petrozavodsk theatre. From Vasilchikov, Bogdanova-Chesnokova learned improvisation. In this, Bogdanova-Chesnokova succeeded in upstaging Vasilchikov and this may have caused discord between them.

== Ukraine ==
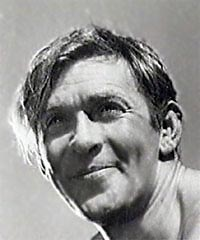
Leonid Utyosov in 1934

In 1928, the State Theatre of Musical Comedy of Kharkiv, Ukraine was founded. The Ukraine leader, Grigory Petrovsky put Vasilchikov in charge of the new troupe.

Meanwhile, the actress and singer, Rina Zelyonaya engaged Bogdanova-Chesnokova at the Leningrad Music Hall which had opened on 5 December 1928.

When Bogdanova-Chesnokova later arrived in Kharkiv, she found her work difficult because every performance was in Ukrainian. Vasilchikov refused Bogdanova-Chesnokova access to their daughter. He divorced her and married the actress, Yekatherina Mikhailovna Leonidova.

In mid 1929, the Theatre of Musical Comedy in Leningrad was founded. Its artistic director, the actor Nikolay Yanet, who was a friend of Vasilchikov, refused to employ Bogdanova-Chesnokova although the troupe was perfect for her.

In 1931, Bogdanova-Chesnokova made her cinema debut in the film, Road to Life. It was the first sound film in the Soviet Union. Zelyonaya contributed to the film and brought in Bogdanova-Chesnokova. Both actresses played gang girls who sing together. The film's tape was defective and so the film was shortened to show only the last verse of their song. Bogdanova-Chesnokova does not appear in the credits.

== Leningrad Music Hall ==
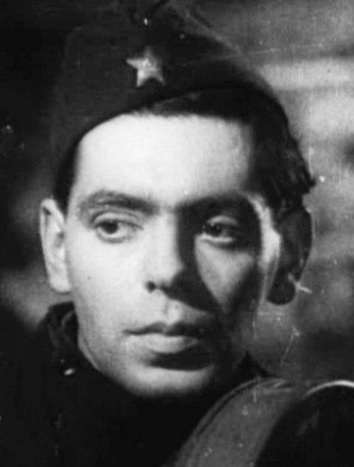
Arkady Raikin in 1942

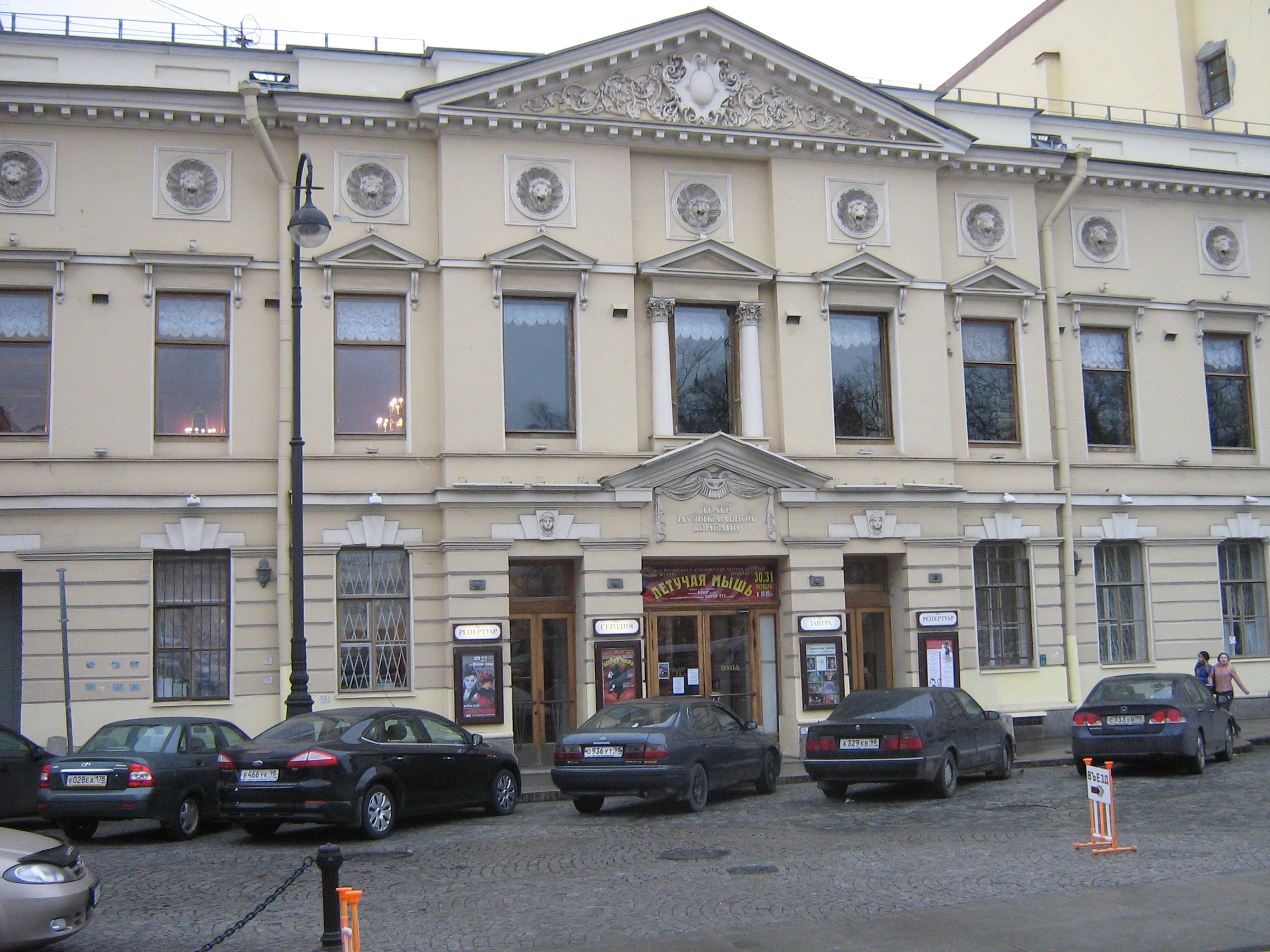
The Musical Comedy Hall

From 1933 to 1941, Bogdanova-Chesnokova worked at the Leningrad Music Hall under Leonid Utyosov. Bogdanova-Chesnokova sang a translated French song called Beautiful Marquise with Utyosov. She may also have recorded the piece. During this period, she also worked with Arkady Raikin at the Theatre of the Stage and Miniatures.

=== World War II ===
During World War II, Bogdanova-Chesnokova entertained troops at the front line, giving approximately 3,000 performances with an operetta ensemble. She was awarded the Order of the Red Star and combat medals for her service.

=== Circus ===
Following the war, in 1946, Bogdanova-Chesnokova returned to the Leningrad State Theatre of Musical Comedy. In the mid 1950s, Bogdanova-Chesnokova performed during three circus seasons with the clown, Boris Vyatkin The act involved acrobatic actions.

== Film ==
=== Tamer of Tigers (1955) ===
In 1955, Bogdanova-Chesnokova made her first significant film appearance. She played Maria Mikhailovna in the comedy film Tamer of Tigers.

=== Mister X (1958) ===
Generally, Bogdanova-Chesnokova was a character actress taking supporting roles. However, in 1958, she played the lead part of "Karolina" in the operetta film Mister Iks. Her leading man, playing "Pelican" was Grigoriy Yaron.

=== Television ===
In 1965, Bogdanova-Chesnokova and Oleg Popov performed Rosina's aria from Gioachino Rossini's The Barber of Seville for the Leningrad television program "Concert Kaleidoscope".

=== The Twelve Chairs ===
In 1971, Bogdanova-Chesnokova performed in the comedy film The Twelve Chairs.

=== The Bat ===
In 1979, Bogdanova-Chesnokova acted in The Bat. It was a musical comedy based on Die Fledermaus. Bogdanova-Chesnokova played the part of "Amalie".

== Awards and titles ==
On 22 June 1957, (or in 1965 as per other source) Bogdanova-Chesnokova was made an Honored Artist of the RSFSR.

On 24 April 1970, she was made a People's Artist of the RSFSR.

She has received many decorations, including the Order of the Red Banner of Labour and the Order of the Red Star.

== Selected filmography ==
- Road to Life (1931) as girl
- Silva (1944) as Princess Weglersheim
- Tamer of Tigers (1954) as Maria Mikhailovna
- Mister Iks (1958) as Karolina
- The Overcoat (1959) as birthday man's wife
- The Serf Actress (1963) as Rykalova
- Cain XVIII (1963) as the first lady of the court
- Захудалое королевство (1967) as Kanimura
- The Twelve Chairs (1971) as Yelena Stanislavovna Bour
- Finist, the brave Falcon (1975) as old lady
- The Blue Bird (1976) as Madame Pleasure
- Truffaldino from Bergamo (1976) as the lady is a citizen
- Захудалое королевство (1978) as Kanimura
- Die Fledermaus (1979) as Amalie

== See also ==
- A film about the Life and Career of Glikeriya Bogdanova-Chesnokova.
- Film about Pieter's Operetta.
- To Remember Glikeriya Bogdanova-Chesnokova
- When the Idols Left
