= Sergei Tiulpanov =

Russian politician (1901–1984)

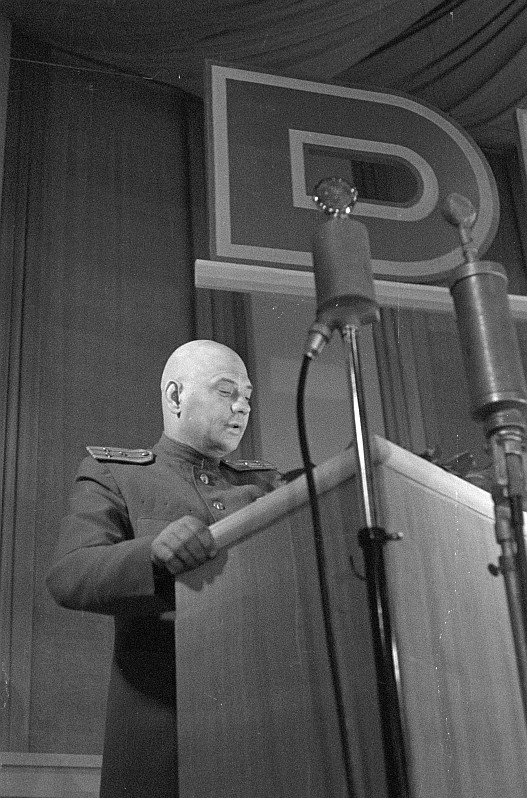

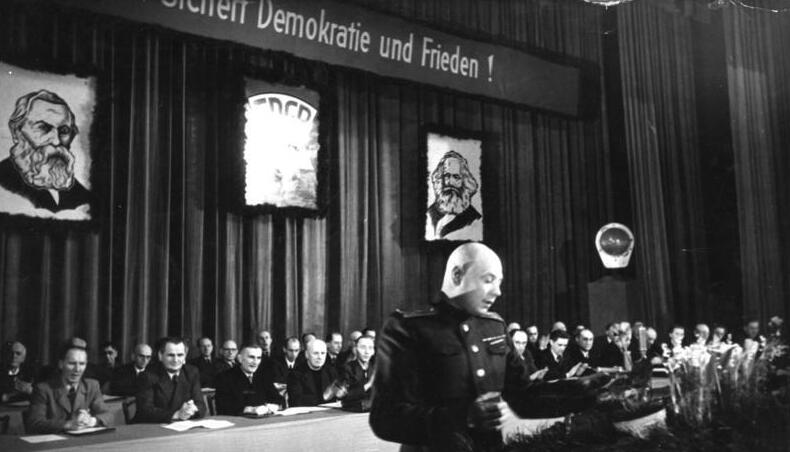
Sergei Ivanovich Tiulpanov, Berlin, 1946

Major General Sergei Ivanovich Tiulpanov (Russian: Сергей Иванович Тюльпанов; 3 October 1901 – 16 February 1987) was a Soviet economist and the director of the Propaganda Administration of the Soviet Military Administration in Germany which governed eastern Germany from 1945–1949.

Tiulpanov spoke fluent German. He was a strong supporter of Walter Ulbricht and of the Sovietization of eastern Germany. He closely monitored the activities of the newly formed Socialist Unity Party of Germany, which was to govern the country.

Tiulpanov considered himself a hardline Bolshevik, and fell from favor as it became clear that Joseph Stalin did not support his and Ulbricht's plans for the rapid establishment of socialism in eastern Germany. Tiulpanov was recalled from his post to Moscow in 1949 on the basis that he failed to report some of his associates that were convicted of betrayal.

From 1950 he was of deputy head of the department of political economy of the Naval Academy in Leningrad and then he became head of the department of political economy of the Budyonny Military Academy of the Signal Corps.

Tiulpanov retired from the military in 1956 and dedicated the rest of his life to academia, first as vice-rector of Leningrad State University, and from 1957 dean of the department of economics of modern capitalism that he himself had founded. In 1956 he received an honorary doctorate from the Karl Marx Leipzig University.

Tiulpanov died in 1987 and was buried at the Serafimovskoye cemetery.
