= Boris Fenster =

Soviet dancer, choreographer and ballet master (1916–1960)

- Борис Александрович Фенстер
- Born: April 30, 1916; Petrograd, Russian Empire
- Died: December 29, 1960 (aged 44); Leningrad, Russian SFSR, Soviet Union
- Education: Leningrad Choreographic School, Leningrad Conservatory
- Occupations: Ballet dancer, choreographer, ballet master
- Years active: 1936–1960
- Awards: Honoured Artist of the RSFSR (1955), People’s Artist of the RSFSR (1957), Stalin Prize (1948, 1950)

Boris Fenster (17 (30) April 1916 – 29 December 1960) was a Soviet dancer, choreographer and ballet master whose career was closely associated with the development of Soviet drambalet (dramatised ballet, officially promoted at the Kirov Ballet to replace works based primarily on choreographic display and innovation) in the mid-20th century. He was awarded the titles of Honoured Artist of the RSFSR in 1955 and People’s Artist of the RSFSR in 1957, and was a two-time laureate of the Stalin Prize (1948, 1950).

== Early life and education ==
Fenster was born in Petrograd on 17 (30) April 1916 into a working-class family. His father was employed by the Nikolaevskaya railway. He entered the Leningrad Choreographic School at the age of nine, where he studied under Leonid Leontiev, Vasily Ponomaryov, and Leonid Petrov.

Fenster completed the performance division of the school in 1936 and graduated from its ballet-master courses in 1940, studying choreography under Fyodor Lopukhov. During his student years, he developed early organizational and leadership skills, which later became a defining feature of his professional career.

== Career ==
While still a student, Fenster became closely associated with choreographer Leonid Lavrovsky, serving as his assistant during productions at the choreographic school and later at the Maly Opera Theatre. He assisted Lavrovsky on productions including Fadetta (1934) and Katerina (1935), and soon began performing leading roles himself, such as René in Fadetta, Harlequin in Arlequinade, and Colas in La Fille mal gardée.

His choreographic debut took place while he was still completing his formal education, with Tom Sawyer set to music by Konstantin Gladkovsky, followed by his diploma production Ashik-Kerib (1940), staged at the Maly Opera Theatre to mark the centenary of the death of Mikhail Lermontov.

=== War years and post-war reconstruction ===
At the outbreak of World War II, Fenster remained in besieged Leningrad while major cultural institutions were evacuated. During the first year of the siege, he served as ballet master of the Theatre of the People’s Militia. He later performed with evacuated companies in Novosibirsk and Perm, as well as with frontline concert brigades.

After rejoining the Maly Opera Theatre in 1943 and returning to Leningrad in 1944, Fenster played a key role in restoring the company’s ballet repertoire under difficult post-war conditions. His first post-war premiere was The Imaginary Bridegroom (1946), followed by Doctor Aybolit (1948), which became one of the earliest Soviet ballets specifically aimed at children.

=== Major works and drambalet aesthetics ===
Fenster’s most significant achievement was the contemporary Soviet ballet Youth (1949), based on Nikolai Ostrovsky’s novel How the Steel Was Tempered. The production combined classical dance, folk elements, pantomime, and everyday gesture within the framework of drambalet, and was awarded the Stalin Prize (Second Degree).

Throughout his career, Fenster consistently aligned himself with drambalet, viewing it as a comprehensive theatrical form capable of addressing historical, literary, and contemporary themes. His works frequently emphasised psychological characterisation, narrative clarity, and detailed depiction of historical settings, while also drawing on a wide range of genres, from epic and dramatic to comedic.

A recurring literary focus in Fenster’s choreography was Mikhail Lermontov's work. Following Ashik-Kerib and Bela, he returned to Lermontov’s texts in his final ballet, Masquerade (1960), staged at the Kirov Theatre.

=== Leadership, teaching, and final years ===
From 1945 to 1953, Fenster served as artistic director of the ballet company of the Maly Opera Theatre, later becoming its chief ballet master, and from 1956 to 1959 held the position of chief ballet master of the Kirov Theatre. In parallel, he taught at the Leningrad Conservatory between 1949 and 1959 and later served on the Artistic Council of the Ministry of Culture of the USSR.

== Death ==
Fenster died suddenly of a heart attack on 29 December 1960 during a general rehearsal of Masquerade at the Kirov Theatre. He was buried at the Serafimovskoe Cemetery in Leningrad.

== See also ==
- List of Russian ballet dancers
