= MV Mekhanik Tarasov =

Soviet cargo ship

MV Mekhanik Tarasov was a Soviet Union-flagged cargo ship that was in service from 1976 until her sinking in 1982 in the North Atlantic Ocean.

Mekhanik Tarasov was built by the Hollming shipyard of Rauma, Finland. She was laid down on 24 October 1975 and launched on 20 February 1976, and was delivered on 22 October 1976. She measured 123.7 metres (406 ft) long, with a beam of 19.6 metres (64 ft), and had a service speed of 16.5 knots (30.6 km/h) from a single diesel-powered propeller. She had a gross tonnage of 4,262 GT and a deadweight tonnage of 5,306 DWT.

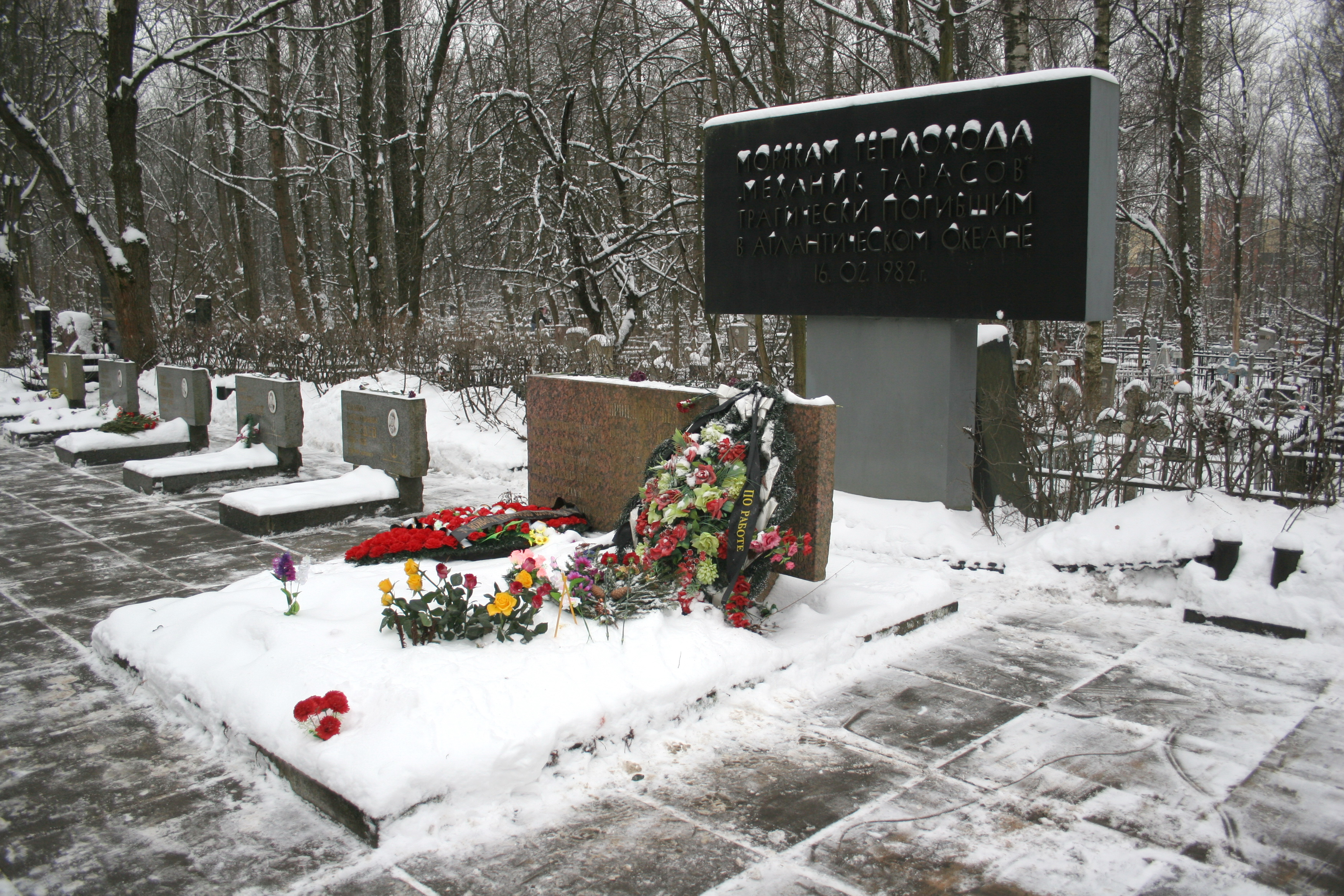
The memorial in the Serafimovskoe Cemetery, Saint Petersburg, to those who lost their lives in the sinking

In February 1982, Mekhanik Tarasov was sailing eastbound from Montreal to Leningrad with a mixed cargo of containers and about 2,500 tonnes (2,500,000 kg) of newsprint when she encountered a severe storm. On the afternoon of 15 February, containers shifted in the heavy seas and punctured a ballast tank, causing the ship to list. During the afternoon, with the list reaching 30 degrees, the crew contacted the ship's shore agents requesting help before then declining assistance later in the evening from the Faroese longline fishing ship Sigurfari. Shortly before midnight, the crew reported flooding, apparently caused by a damaged ventilation cowl that allowed water ingress into the ship. She sank early in the morning of 16 February about 240 miles (390 km) east of Newfoundland, with only five crewmembers rescued by Sigurfari. The survivors were transferred to the Canadian Coast Guard icebreaker Sir Humphrey Gilbert; the Sigurfari, along with the Soviet vessel Ivan Dvorsky, located 21 bodies from the crew of Mekhanik Tarasov. The remaining 12 members of the 37-person crew were never found, and the search was called off on 19 February.
