= Giorgi Abashvili =

Soviet Naval Officer (1910 – 1982)

Personal details
- Born: Georgiy Semyonovich Abashvili; 8 January 1910 Tiflis, Tiflis Governorate, Caucasus Viceroyalty, Russian Empire
- Died: 26 September 1982 (aged 72) Leningrad, Russian SFSR, Soviet Union
- Party: Communist Party of the Soviet Union (1927-1962)
- Profession: Sailor

Military service
- Allegiance: Soviet Union
- Branch/service: Soviet Navy
- Years of service: 1927–1962
- Rank: Vice Admiral
- Commands: destroyer divisions cruiser Maxim Gorky cruiser Chapayev naval squadrons naval task forces
- Battles/wars: World War II; Winter War; Siege of Leningrad; Cold War; Cuban Missile Crisis; Operation Anadyr

Georgy Abashvili (Georgian: გიორგი აბაშვილი; Russian: Гео́ргий Семёнович Абашви́ли, Georgiy Semyonovich Abashvili) (8 January 1910 – 26 September 1982) was a Soviet naval commander and vice-admiral (1955).

An ethnic Georgian, Abashvili was born in 1910 in Tbilisi, Georgia, then part of the Russian Empire. He graduated from the Leningrad Naval College in 1931 and joined the Soviet Baltic Fleet with which he served through the Finnish campaign and World War II. In 1944, he was deputy chief of staff of the Baltic Fleet and also commanded a division of destroyers which played a vital role in relieving the blockade of Leningrad. In 1953 he was senior officer with the Soviet vessels visiting Poland and in 1954 with those called in Finland. During the Cuban Missile Crisis in 1962, Abashvili was deputy commander-in-chief to Issa Pliyev and naval commander in the proposed Group of Soviet forces in Cuba (Operation Anadyr). According to historical records, he was against the immediate use of force during the Cuba crisis days. On the night of October 28, 1962, he delayed the execution of the order to launch missiles by six minutes, thereby preventing the start of World War III. He retired the same year and died of stroke in Leningrad in 1982.
