= Nikolai Sokolov (footballer, born 1897) =

Soviet footballer

Personal information
- Full name: Nikolai Yevgrafovich Sokolov
- Date of birth: 12 May 1897
- Place of birth: Moscow, Russia
- Date of death: 15 December 1988 (aged 91)
- Place of death: Razliv, Leningrad Oblast, USSR
- Position: Goalkeeper

Senior career*
Years	Team	Apps	(Gls)
1914–1922	SKZ Moscow		
1923–1924	Yakht-Klub Raykomvoda Moscow		
1925	MSFK Moscow		
1925–1931	Dynamo Leningrad		
1935	Dynamo Leningrad		

International career
1924–1925	USSR	2	(0)
- * Club domestic league appearances and goals

Nikolai Yevgrafovich Sokolov (Russian: Николай Евграфович Соколов) (12 May 1897 in Moscow – 15 December 1988 in Razliv, Leningrad Oblast) was a Soviet football player.

== Honours ==
- RSFSR champion: 1920, 1922.
- USSR champion: 1920.

== International career ==
Sokolov made his debut for USSR on November 16, 1924 in a friendly against Turkey.
