= Valentin Fyodorov =

Soviet Russian footballer and coach

Personal information
- Full name: Valentin Vasilyevich Fyodorov
- Date of birth: 11 April 1911
- Place of birth: Leningrad (St. Petersburg), Russia
- Date of death: 4 December 1981 (aged 70)
- Place of death: Leningrad, Russian SFSR
- Height: 1.78 m (5 ft 10 in)
- Position: Midfielder

Senior career*
| Years | Team | Apps | (Gls) |
| 1925–1926 | Uritsky Factory Leningrad | | |
| 1927–1930 | Pishcheviki Leningrad | | |
| 1931–1941 | FC Dinamo Leningrad | | |
| 1945–1946 | FC Dinamo Leningrad | | |

Managerial career
- 1946–1950: FC Dinamo Leningrad (assistant)
- 1953: FC Dinamo Leningrad (assistant)
- 1961–1963: FC Spartak Leningrad
- 1964–1966: FC Zenit Leningrad
- 1965–1966: FC Zenit Leningrad (team director)
- 1967: FC Chornomorets Odesa
- 1968: FC Terek Grozny
- 1971–1972: FC Dynamo Leningrad
- * Club domestic league appearances and goals

Valentin Vasilyevich Fyodorov (Russian: Валентин Васильевич Фёдоров; born 11 April 1911 in St. Petersburg; died 4 December 1981 in Leningrad) was a Soviet football player and coach.
