= Yevgeni Yeliseyev =

Russian footballer

Personal information
- Full name: Yevgeni Ivanovich Yeliseyev
- Date of birth: 25 December 1908
- Place of birth: Moscow, Russia
- Date of death: 21 August 1999 (aged 90)
- Place of death: St. Petersburg, Russia
- Height: 1.80 m (5 ft 11 in)
- Position: Midfielder

Youth career
- 1922: FC SKZ Moscow
- 1923–1925: Krasnaya Roza Moscow

Senior career*
| Years | Team | Apps | (Gls) |
| 1926–1930 | FC Tryokhgorka Moscow | | |
| 1931–1935 | Baltvod Leningrad | | |
| 1936–1941 | Dynamo Moscow | 64 | (6) |
| 1945 | Dinamo Minsk | 5 | (0) |

Managerial career
- 1945–1947: Dinamo Minsk
- 1947–1948: FC Dinamo Riga
- 1949–1953: Daugava Riga
- 1955: Daugava Riga (assistant)
- 1956–1957: Daugava Riga
- 1958–1959: Lokomotiv Moscow
- 1960: REZ Riga
- 1961–1964: Zenit Leningrad
- 1965–1966: Avanhard Kharkiv
- 1967: Zenit Leningrad (assistant)
- 1967: Daugava-REZ Riga (assistant)
- 1968: Pakhtakor Tashkent
- 1969: Politotdel Tashkent Oblast
- * Club domestic league appearances and goals

Yevgeni Ivanovich Yeliseyev (Russian: Евгений Иванович Елисеев; born 25 December 1908 – 21 August 1999) was a Soviet Russian football player and coach.

== Honours ==
- Soviet Top League champion: 1936 (spring), 1937, 1940.
- Soviet Cup winner: 1937.
- Top-33 season best players list: 1930 (#2), 1933 (#3), 1938 (Top-55 / #1).
