= Anatoly Karelin =

Soviet MiG-15 pilot

- Native name: Анатолий Михайлович Карелин
- Born: 16 July 1922; Dalmatovo, Kurgan Oblast, Russian SFSR, Soviet Union
- Died: 3 January 1974 (aged 51) Leningrad, Russian SFSR, Soviet Union
- Allegiance: Soviet Union
- Branch: Soviet Air Force
- Service years: 1941–1970
- Rank: Major general
- Conflicts: World War II; Eastern Front; Korean War
- Awards: Hero of the Soviet Union

Anatoly Mikhailovich Karelin (Russian: Анатолий Михайлович Карелин; 16 July 1922 – 3 January 1974) was a Soviet MiG-15 flying ace during the Korean War, credited with six to eight victories for which he was awarded the title Hero of the Soviet Union.

== Awards ==
- Hero of the Soviet Union (14 July 1953)
- Two Order of Lenin (21 June 1952 and 14 July 1953)
- Two Order of the Red Banner (25 September 1952 and 22 February 1968)
- Order of the Red Star (30 December 1956)
- Medal "For Battle Merit" (13 June 1952)

== See also ==
- List of Korean War flying aces
