= Mikhail Mikhin =

Soviet MiG-15 pilot

Mikhail Ivanovich Mikhin
- Russian: Михаил Иванович Михин
- Born: 25 October 1923; Bor-Forpost, Altai region, USSR
- Died: 25 March 2007 (aged 83); Saint Petersburg, Russia
- Military career
- Allegiance: Soviet Union
- Branch: Soviet Air Force
- Service years: 1941 – 1980
- Rank: General-Major of Aviation
- Unit: 518th Fighter Aviation Regiment
- Conflicts: Korean War
- Awards: Hero of the Soviet Union

Mikhail Ivanovich Mikhin (1923-2007) was a Soviet MiG-15 pilot who became a flying ace during the Korean War, credited with nine to twelve victories. He was awarded the title Hero of the Soviet Union.

== See also ==
- List of Korean War flying aces
