= Vitaly Bujanovsky =

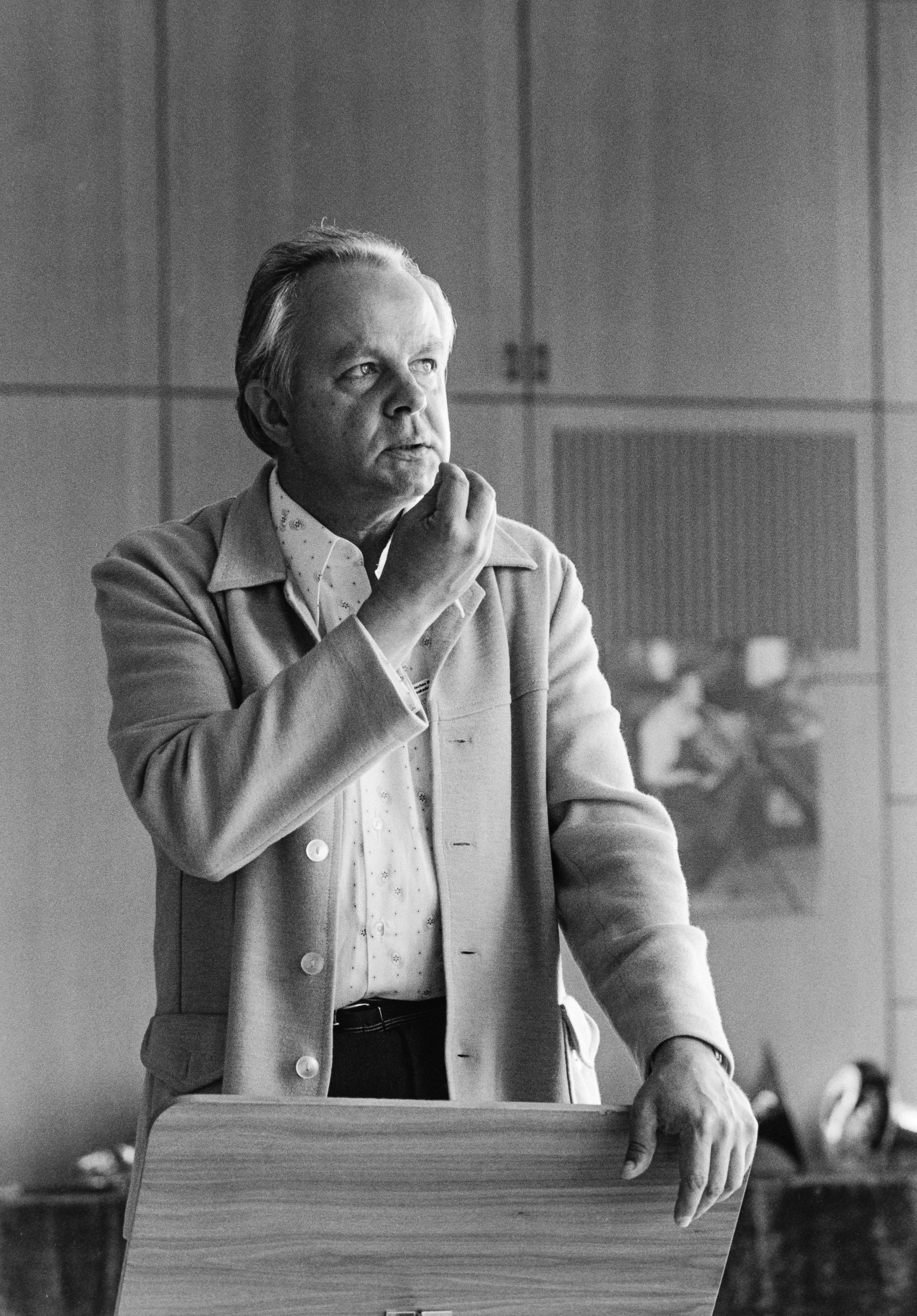

Background information
- Born: Vitaly Mikhailovich Bujanovsky; 27 August 1928; Leningrad, USSR
- Origin: Russia
- Died: 5 May 1993 (aged 64) Saint Petersburg, Russia
- Genres: Classical music
- Occupations: Musician, music teacher and composer
- Instrument: French horn
- Years active: 1946–1993
- Formerly of: Leningrad Philharmonic Orchestra

Vitaly Mikhailovich Bujanovsky or Buyanovsky (Russian: Виталий Михайлович Буяновский; 27 August 1928, in Leningrad – 5 May 1993, in Saint Petersburg) was a Soviet Russian classical horn player, music teacher and composer. He was the principal horn player at the Leningrad Philharmonic Orchestra under Yevgeny Mravinsky and professor at the Leningrad Conservatory. In 1985 he was elected an IHS Honorary Member.
