= Lev Burchalkin =

Russian footballer

Personal information
- Full name: Lev Dmitriyevich Burchalkin
- Date of birth: 9 January 1939
- Place of birth: Leningrad, USSR
- Date of death: 7 September 2004 (aged 65)
- Place of death: St. Petersburg, Russia
- Height: 1.70 m (5 ft 7 in)
- Position: Striker

Youth career
- Bolshevik Leningrad

Senior career*
Years	Team	Apps	(Gls)
1957–1972	Zenit Leningrad	400	(78)

International career
1964	USSR	1	(0)

Managerial career
- 1977: Zenit Leningrad (director)
- 1982–1985: Luch Vladivostok (assistant)
- 1985–1987: Victory Sports Club
- 1988–1989: Zenit Leningrad (assistant)
- 1990–1991: FC Shakhter Karagandy
- 1992: Luch Vladivostok
- 1993: FC Kosmos-Kirovets Saint Petersburg
- 1993–1994: FC Lokomotiv Saint Petersburg
- 1995: Luch Vladivostok
- 1996–1997: Zenit St. Petersburg (assistant)
- 1998–2000: FC Zenit-2 St. Petersburg
- 2001: FC Pskov-2000
- 2002: FC Zenit-2 St. Petersburg
- * Club domestic league appearances and goals

Lev Dmitriyevich Burchalkin (Russian: Лев Дмитриевич Бурчалкин) (born 9 January 1939 – died 7 September 2004) was a Soviet football player and Russian coach.

== Honours ==
- Holds FC Zenit Saint Petersburg records for league appearances (400) and goals (78).

== International career ==
Burchalkin played his only game for USSR on May 20, 1964, in a friendly against Uruguay.
