= Boris Gutnikov =

Soviet violinist

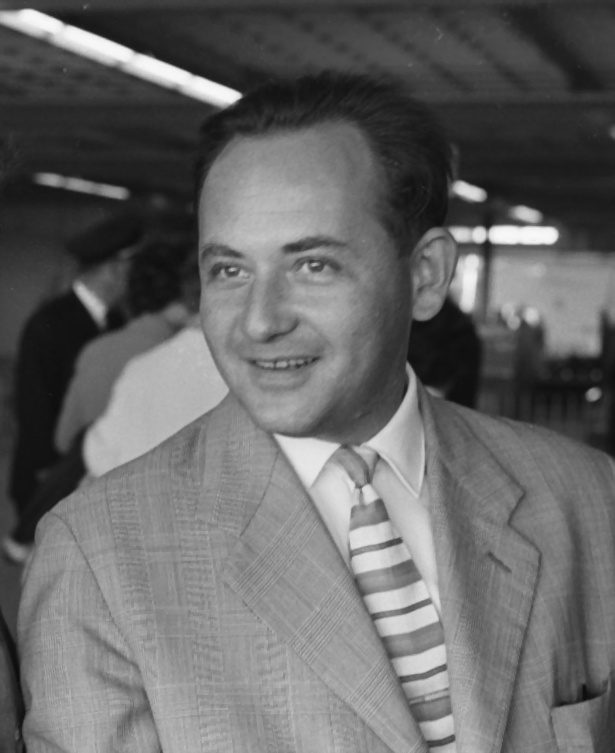
Boris Gutnikov in 1962

Boris Lvovich Gutnikov (Russian: Борис Львович Гу́тников) (4 July 1931 in Vitebsk – 6 April 1986 in Leningrad) was a Soviet violinist, born in the Byelorussian SSR.

He won the 1957 Long-Thibaud Competition and, most notably, the 1962 International Tchaikovsky Competition. He had been appointed a teacher at the Leningrad Conservatory soon before.

Andrei Petrov composed in 1987 his Memoria for violin and ensemble in memoriam Gutnikov.
