= Saint Petersburg Hotel (Saint Petersburg, Russia) =

Hotel in Saint-Petersburg, Russia

Coordinates: 59.9569°N 30.3418°E

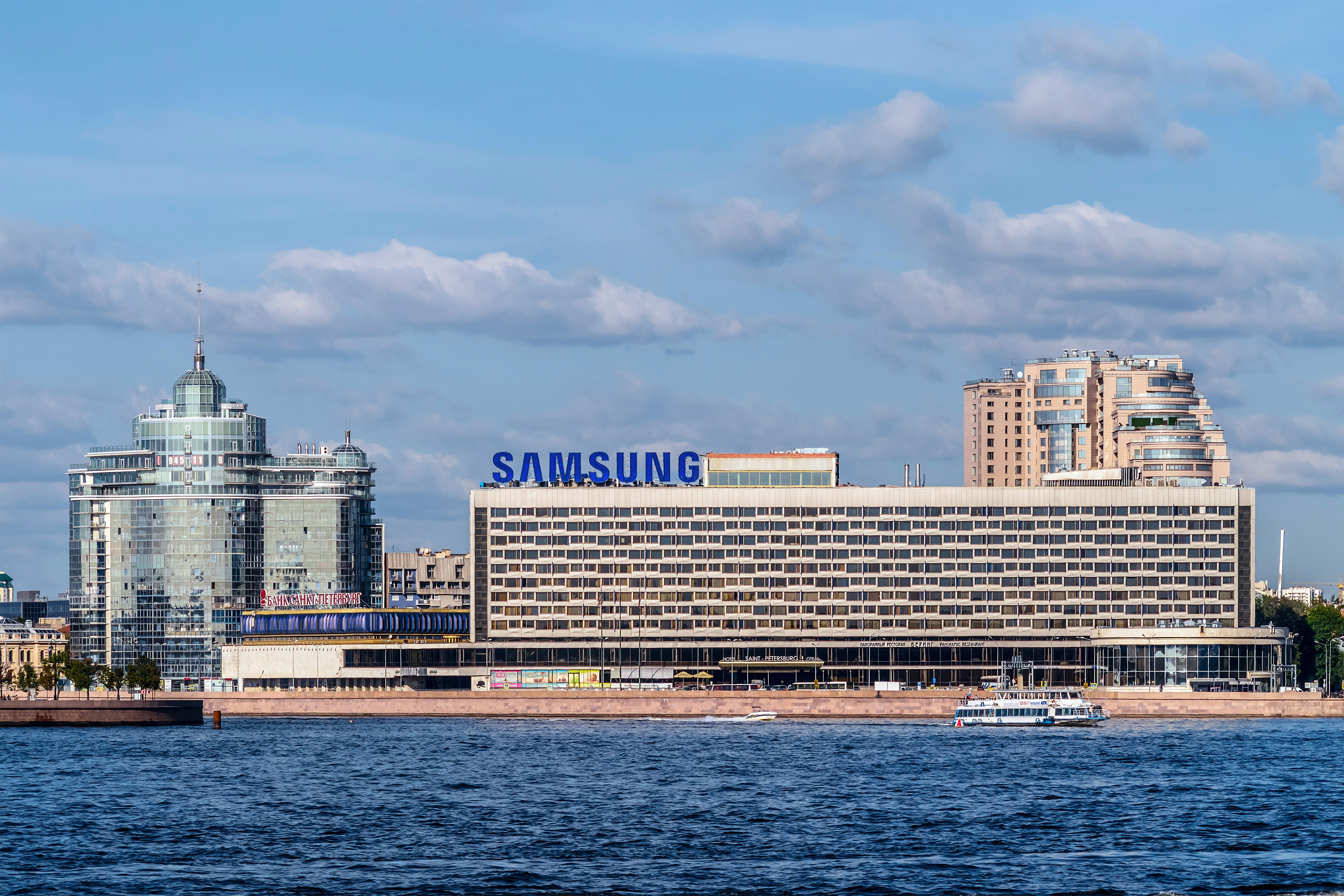
- "Saint-Petersburg" hotel on Pirogovskaya embankment
- Interactive map of the Saint Petersburg Hotel area

General information
- Type: Hotel
- Location: Russia, Saint Petersburg

Other information
- Number of rooms: 554

The Saint Petersburg is a four-star hotel in Saint Petersburg, Russia. It was constructed in 1970 under the name Hotel Leningrad. The hotel has 554 rooms and a concert hall with a capacity of 797 people. It also contains an exhibition area and three conference halls.

== History ==
In 1967, the Hotel Leningrad started construction. The architects were S.B. Speransky, V.E. Struzman and N.V. Kamensky. The original plan was to build the hotel in two stages. The second stage, never completed, was to construct a 13-story building in the form of an open-ring with an inner courtyard with a swimming pool and fountains.

Opening in 1970, the hotel was the first large hotel in the area since before World War II. The hotel was the first in the Soviet Union to offer buffet-breakfast and Continental breakfast.

In 1986, the second part of the match for the world chess championship between Garry Kasparov and Anatoliy Karpov was held in the hotel.

On February 23, 1991, a fire consumed the seventh, eighth and ninth floors of the hotel, killing seven guests and nine firefighters. A monument to the firefighters is located near the Kalininsky district fire station.

In 2017 "Saint-Petersburg" became the hotel of the year according to the analytical portal Hotel Advisor.

== Facilities ==
The hotel has restaurants and bars One restaurant has a brewery and bakery where live music performances are held almost daily. The second floor of the hotel contained a winter garden with views of the historical part of the city.
