= Vladimir Alafuzov =

Soviet admiral (1901–1966)

Vladimir Antonovich Alafuzov
- Влади́мир Анто́нович Алафу́зов
- Born: 17 June 1901; Riga
- Died: 30 May 1966 (aged 64); Leningrad
- Education: Naval Academy
- Occupation: Soviet admiral

Vladimir Antonovich Alafuzov (Russian: Влади́мир Анто́нович Алафу́зов; 17 June 1901, in Riga – 30 May 1966, in Leningrad) was a Soviet admiral and Order of Ushakov recipient, which he received on 8 November 1944. He joined the Russian Navy at the age of 17 and graduated from the Naval Academy by 1932.
