= Nina Pigulevskaya =

Russian historian and orientalist (1894-1970)

Nina Viktorovna Pigulevskaya (Russian: Ни́на Ви́кторовна Пигуле́вская; 13 January 1894, Saint Petersburg – 17 February 1970, Leningrad) was a Soviet and Russian historian and orientalist. A graduate of the Saint Petersburg State University, she began working at the Academy of Sciences of the Soviet Union in 1934, and by 1937 was working at the Institute of Oriental Studies of the Russian Academy of Sciences, later teaching at the Saint Petersburg State University from 1944 to 1951. She was made vice president of the Imperial Orthodox Palestine Society in 1952, and was a member of the Société Asiatique since 1960. She was received an Order of the Red Banner of Labour and two Orders of the Badge of Honour by the Soviet Union.
