= Henry Farquharson =

- Born: c. 1675; Whitehouse, Aberdeenshire
- Died: 19 December 1739 (aged 63–64); St. Petersburg, Russia
- Education: University of Aberdeen
- Occupation: Mathematics Tutor
- Father: John Farquharson

Henry Farquharson (c.1675 – 19 December 1739) was a teacher who pioneered the study of mathematics in Russia. He was recruited by Peter the Great, who sought to introduce Western ideas and technology into Russia. He moved to Moscow where he established a school and later established a naval academy in Saint Petersburg. Farquharson had a profound effect on the intellectual life of Russia, not only by introducing mathematical ideas but by helping to create the first generation of explorers, surveyors, cartographers and astronomers.

== Early life ==
Henry Farquharson was born around 1675 at Milton, Whitehouse in West Aberdeenshire, the son of John Farquharson. From 1691 he studied as Milne bursar at Marischal College in Aberdeen and by 1695 he was Liddel mathematical tutor there. In April 1698 he was introduced to the tsar of Russia, Peter the Great, probably by the Marquess of Carmarthen. The tsar was at this time on a tour of Europe to learn from Western ideas and technology. In particular he was interested in creating a modern Russian navy. Peter the Great recruited Farquharson for a new mathematics and navigation school that he planned to found in Moscow.

== Moscow ==
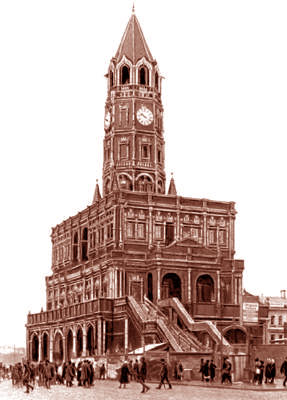
Sukharev Tower

Farquharson sailed on the Royal Transport with Stephen Gwyn (d.1720) and Richard Grice (d.1709) and they arrived in Archangel by June 1698. After their arrival in Moscow they lived in the house of an English merchant Henry Crevett and tutored a few paying students whilst they waited for the tsar to follow through with his promises of patronage.

By January 1701 a government decree had established the Mathematics and Navigation School. By June the school moved to the Sukharev Tower, a repurposed city gate and a Moscow landmark until its demolition in the 1930s. The school taught arithmetic, trigonometry, navigation, astronomy and surveying. Within a few years there were 500 pupils at the school, and by 1715 1200 specialists are thought to have graduated from the school. The school also held music and amateur stage performances on holidays and Sundays. At first Farquharson lectured in Latin until he learned Russian. He belonged to the quasi-masonic Neptune Society which met in the Sukharev Tower and was headed by the tsar himself. The tsar was fascinated with astronomy and would correspond with Farquharson about eclipses, as well as supplying him with as many instruments and book as he requested. In addition to teaching, Farquharson also performed practical duties. He proposed a direct road from Moscow to the new city of Saint Petersburg via Novgorod and led the surveying work himself.

== St Petersburg ==
In 1715 Peter the Great founded the St Petersburg Naval Academy at Kilkin's House, on the site where the Winter Palace now stands. Farquharson was appointed senior professor of mathematics and although the academy had a president and director, he was in de facto charge of the institute. He created a broad curriculum including not only mathematics and navigation but drawing, fencing, artillery and fortification. In the ten years after its founding 215 cadets graduated from the academy, many went on to complete their training in foreign naval service.

Farquharson was connected to the European scientific elite. He corresponded with Leibniz and the Royal Society about Russia as well as scientific topics. He believed to have translated as many as 38 scientific works into Russian including Euclid's Elements and Henry Brigg's Arithmetic logarithmica. Farquharson was also a talented cartographer, producing a bronze engraving of Mercator's map of America and led the creation of a hydrographic atlas of the Caspian Sea.

By the end of his life, Farquharson had reached the level of brigadier in the Russian table of ranks, a sign of the high respect in which he was held. He died in St. Petersburg on 19 December 1739 and was probably buried in St. Sampson's cemetery.
