= Nikolai Yegipko =

Soviet naval officer (1903-1985)

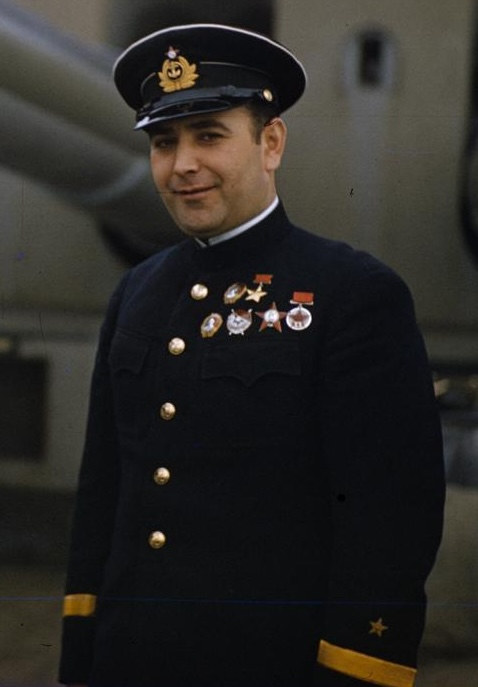
- Aboard HMS King George V in November 1942
- Born: 9 November [O.S. 27 October] 1903; Nikolaev, Kherson Governorate, Russian Empire
- Died: 6 July 1985 (aged 81) Leningrad, Soviet Union
- Buried: Serafimovskoe Cemetery
- Allegiance: Soviet Union
- Branch: Soviet Navy
- Service years: 1919–1920; 1925–1967
- Rank: Vice-Admiral
- Awards: Soviet Union: Hero of the Soviet Union; Order of Lenin (three times); Order of the Red Banner (three times); Order of the Patriotic War First Class (three times); Order of the Patriotic War Second Class; Order of the Red Star; Order of the Partisan Star; Virtuti Militari Fifth Class

Nikolai Pavlovich Yegipko (Russian: Николай Павлович Египко; Ukrainian: Микола Павлович Єгипко; 9 November [O.S. 27 October] 1903 – 6 July 1985) was an officer of the Soviet Navy and a Hero of the Soviet Union. He saw action during the Russian Civil War, the Spanish Civil War, and the Second World War, and rose to the rank of vice-admiral.

Born into the family of a shipyard worker, Yegipko and several of his brothers joined up to fight for the Soviets in the Russian Civil War. He served initially as a field telephonist, though he was wounded, twice captured by White forces, and twice escaped. He spent the rest of the war working with the Komsomol in Nikolaev, though he was not permitted to join their ranks after a report circulated that he washed with "perfumed" soap. With the Soviet victory in the civil war, Yegipko was demobilised and returned to shipyard work. He reenlisted in the armed forces in 1925, serving on ships of the Black Sea Fleet, and then on submarines in the Baltic and Pacific Fleets. In 1936 he commanded the submarine Shch-117 on a record-breaking voyage of endurance, for which he and his entire crew received honours. He then went to Spain to support the Republican faction in the Spanish Civil War. He commanded two submarines during his time there, and though the cause ultimately failed, he was rewarded for his service with the title of Hero of the Soviet Union.

Yegipko commanded submarine brigades after his return to the Soviet Union, including during the Soviet-Finnish War, and after the German invasion of the Soviet Union in June 1941, participated in the Soviet evacuation of Tallinn in August 1941. During this time his submarine, S-5, was sunk by a mine, and Yegipko had to be rescued from the water after being blown overboard. He then became naval attaché to the United Kingdom and was an observer on several of the Arctic convoys, including the disastrous Convoy PQ 17. The later war years were spent with the General Staff of the Armed Forces, after which he held several posts in naval education and academia, ending as head of the Higher Naval School of Submarine Navigation. He retired in 1967 and wrote his memoirs before his death in 1985.

== Family and early life ==
Yegipko was born in Nikolaev, Kherson Governorate, part of the Russian Empire (now Mykolaiv, Ukraine), on 9 November [O.S. 27 October] 1903. His father, Pavel Osipovich, was a worker at the city's shipbuilding yards; his mother was Euphrosyne Mikhailovna. The family was a large one, Nikolai had four brothers and three sisters. On the advice of their father, three of his brothers volunteered for the Red Army, and his eldest brother, Aleksandr, joined the Red naval forces. Though only 16 and not subject to conscription until 22, Nikolai Yegipko volunteered in May 1919 with the 1st battery of the Nikolaev Artillery Division, part of the 14th Army, as a field telephonist. He went on to serve as a cavalry scout, and saw action against the Armed Forces of South Russia led by White General Anton Denikin. Wounded in the leg during a skirmish near Varvarovka, Yegipko was taken to hospital in Odessa. Two days after his arrival, the White forces landed troops and began to occupy the city. Faced with being shot as a Red volunteer, Yegipko escaped from the hospital, and with a Serb companion, attempted to walk to safety, travelling mostly at night. They were captured by the Whites on the fourth day of their journey, and were placed with other captured sailors and Red Army soldiers, being taken to Voznesensk. Yegipko again escaped, hiding in a corn field before making his way to his family in Nikolaev.

At this time the city was under White control. Yegipko had his leg treated by a sympathetic doctor, after which he joined the work of the local Komsomol members who were carrying out secret propaganda with the Don Cossacks. During the day he worked at the shipyard with his father. Despite working with the Komsomol he was not accepted into their ranks, as while discussing his candidacy, it was reported that Yegipko washed with "perfumed" soap, and was therefore not ready to join them. He nevertheless remained on good terms with them, and after Nikolaev fell to the Red forces, he rejoined the artillery division, alongside his brother Andrei. They went on to see action in the Polish–Soviet War, taking part in the capture of the cities of Borsch, Ozerzhany and Galich. After the Treaty of Riga ended the war with Poland, the Red Army began to demobilize minors from its ranks. Yegipko was dismissed from his unit and returned to Nikolaev, where he resumed work in the shipyards.

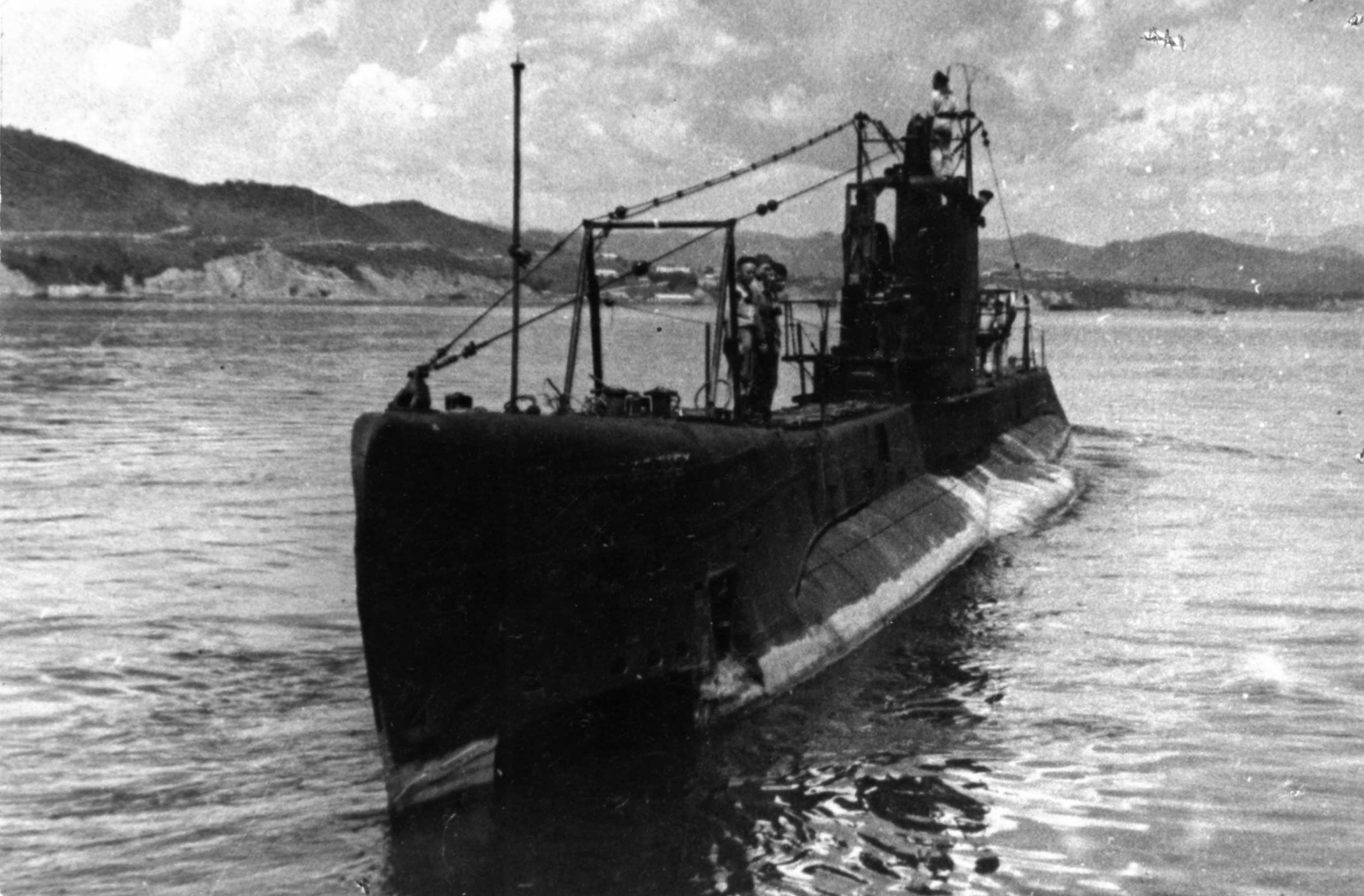
Shch-117. Yegipko was her commander for a cruise that set new records for endurance in 1936.

In 1925 Yegipko joined the Soviet Navy, initially serving with the Black Sea Fleet as an engineer aboard the cruiser Chervona Ukraina and the destroyer Shaumyan. He graduated from the M.V. Frunze Higher Naval School in 1931 and from February to November that year served with the Baltic Fleet as a mine officer aboard the submarine Krasnoflotets. In 1932 he graduated from the classes of the fleet's training detachment and from May that year served as assistant commander of the L-55. From November 1932 he was assistant commander of the Shchuka-class submarine Leshch, and from August 1934 he was commander of the submarine Shch-117. From 11 January 1936 until 20 February Shch-117 carried out an independent cruise, operating under full autonomy for 40 days in order to determine the endurance of the ship and her crew. The voyage, which took place during a period of almost continuously stormy weather, covered 3,022 miles (4,863 km), of which 315 were traversed while submerged. Several times the crew were forced to improvise repairs. Storm waves tore off the edge of a steel sheet, which struck the submarine's hull, damaging the stern of the superstructure. Later problems involved the anchor, the steering gear and one of the electric motors. Each time the crew was able to make repairs. On her return to port Shch-117 had doubled the previous record for a Russian submarine's endurance. The feat was widely publicised during the heyday of the Stakhanovite movements, and in April 1936 all members of the crew received awards. Yegipko and political commissar Sergei Ivanovich Pastukhov received the Order of the Red Star, while the rest of the crew received the Order of the Badge of Honour. This was the first time in the history of the USSR, and of Russia, when the entire crew of a ship received awards.

== Spanish Civil War ==
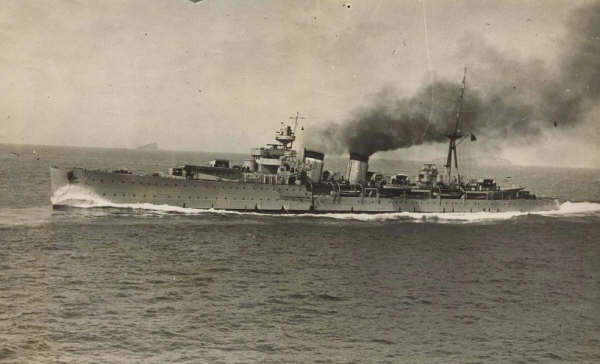
The Nationalist cruiser Almirante Cervera, Yegipko's nemesis during the first part of his Spanish service.

Yegipko began studying at the Naval Academy in March 1936, but left the following year to participate in the Spanish Civil War. In May 1937 Yegipko arrived in Spain as part of the Soviet support for the Republican faction in the Spanish Civil War. He received the nicknames "Matisse" and "Don Severino de Moreno" from the Republicans, and was given command of the Spanish submarine C-6, until she was damaged beyond repair in a Nationalist air raid in October 1937 while in port at Gijón. The city fell to the Nationalists soon afterwards, and Yegipko and his crew evacuated the city in a British transport ship. The ship was intercepted and captured at sea by the Nationalist cruiser Almirante Cervera, but a patrolling British warship intervened and forced the Nationalists to release their prize.^{[a]}

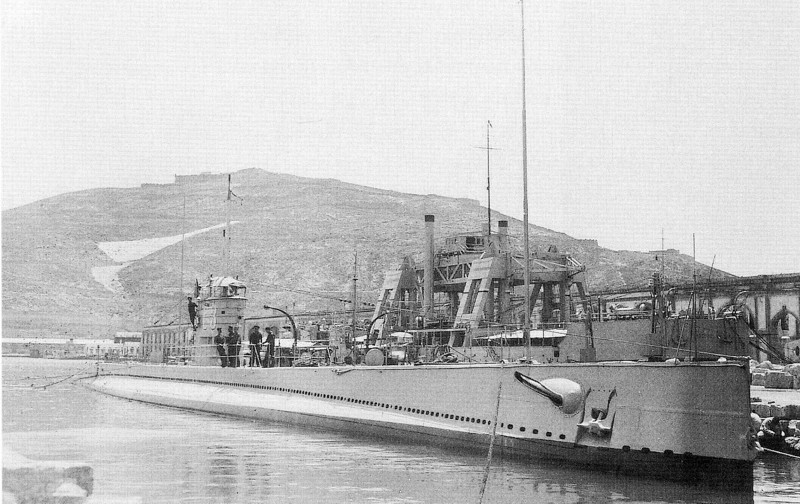
The Spanish submarine C-3, of the same class as Yegipko's commands, C-6 and C-2.

Yegipko then took command of the C-2. While the C-2 was undergoing repairs in Saint-Nazaire, Yegipko received word that the French were planning to intern the submarine at the behest of the Nationalist faction. Yegipko navigated the vessel back to a Spanish port, and then transferred Republican materiel to Cartagena, successfully running the blockade of the Strait of Gibraltar, and sinking a ship on the way. For "courage and heroism in the performance of his military and international duty", Yegipko was, by order of the Supreme Soviet, awarded the title of Hero of the Soviet Union on 22 February 1939.

== Return to the USSR and wartime service ==
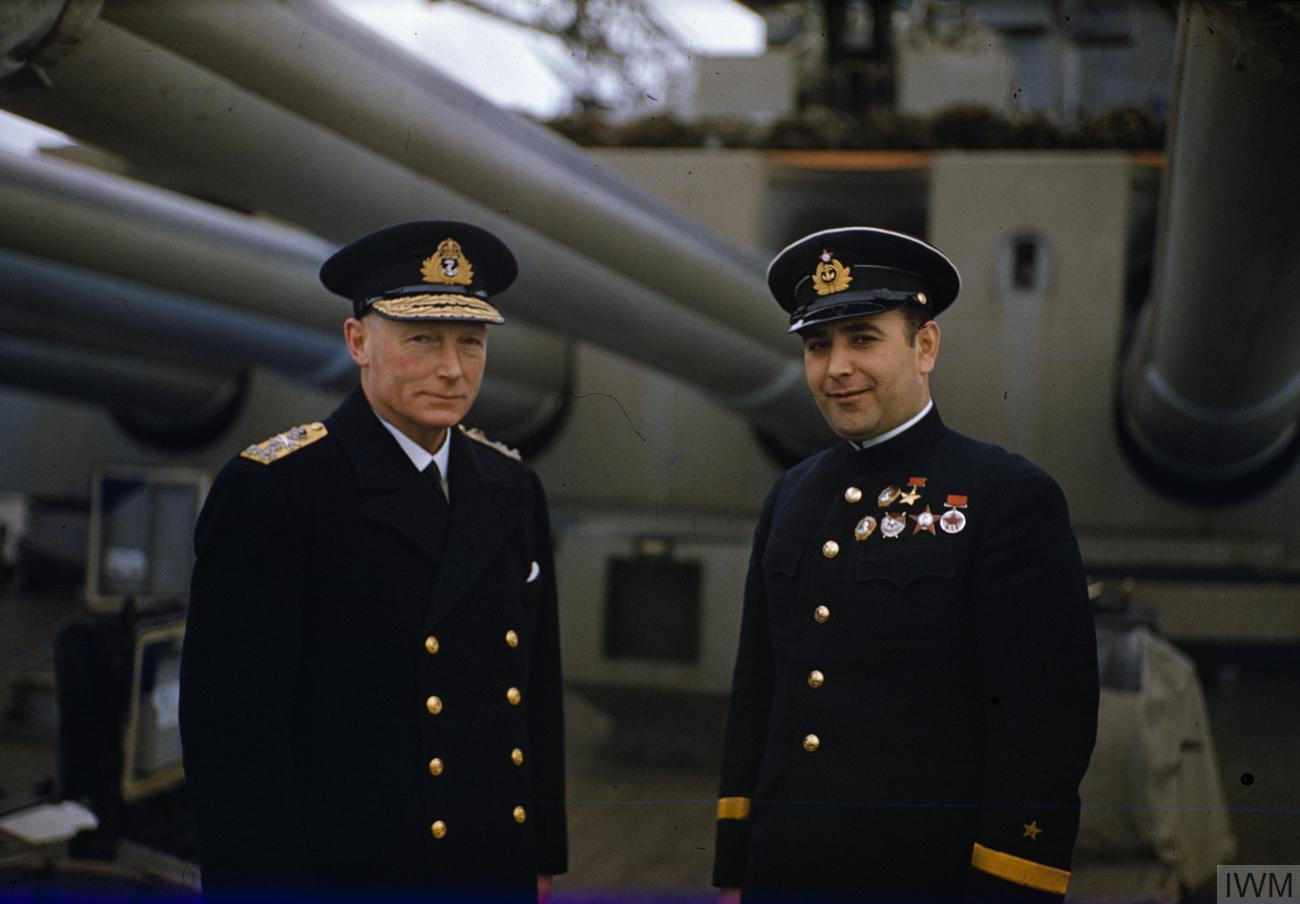
Yegipko, right, with British Admiral John Tovey in November 1942, aboard Tovey's flagship HMS King George V

Yegipko returned to the USSR in August 1938, taking up the post of commander of the Black Sea Fleet's Second Submarine Brigade. He held this position until December 1939, when he became commander of the Baltic Fleet's submarine brigade. He held this post during the Soviet-Finnish War, leaving in May 1940 to resume his studies at the Naval Academy. He graduated in April 1941, being promoted on 26 April to captain 1st rank. From that month until September he was commander of the 1st Submarine Brigade of the Baltic Fleet. Yegipko took part in military operations following the German invasion of the Soviet Union in June 1941. During the Soviet evacuation of Tallinn in August 1941, his submarine, S-5, struck a mine, and Yegipko was blown from the conning tower into the water. He was rescued, heavily concussed, by another vessel. From September to October 1941 he was at the disposal of the Military Council of the Baltic Fleet, before his appointment as naval attaché to the Soviet embassy in the United Kingdom. As naval attaché Yegipko often acted as an observer on British warships, and sailed aboard British vessels on Arctic convoy duties.

In this capacity Yegipko was present with the escorts of Convoy PQ 17 aboard the battleship HMS Duke of York, flagship of Admiral John Tovey, in mid-1942. The convoy suffered heavy casualties when miscommunications led the allied commanders to believe that heavy German naval units were preparing to intercept the convoy, and the escorting warships were redeployed. Yegipko was to record in his memoirs that

"The history of the defeat of convoy PQ-17 reminded me of our transfer of ships from Tallinn to Kronstadt. In either case, the main escort ships left slow-moving and poorly-armed ships with cargo and passengers. The English fleet - because of the fear of large German surface ships, in particular, the battleship Tirpitz, and in our country - because of the fear of losing the fleet's core combat ships and incurring appropriate punishment for it. Both the PQ-17 convoy and the Tallinn crossing remain black spots in the history of the Great Patriotic War."

== Later war years and postwar service ==
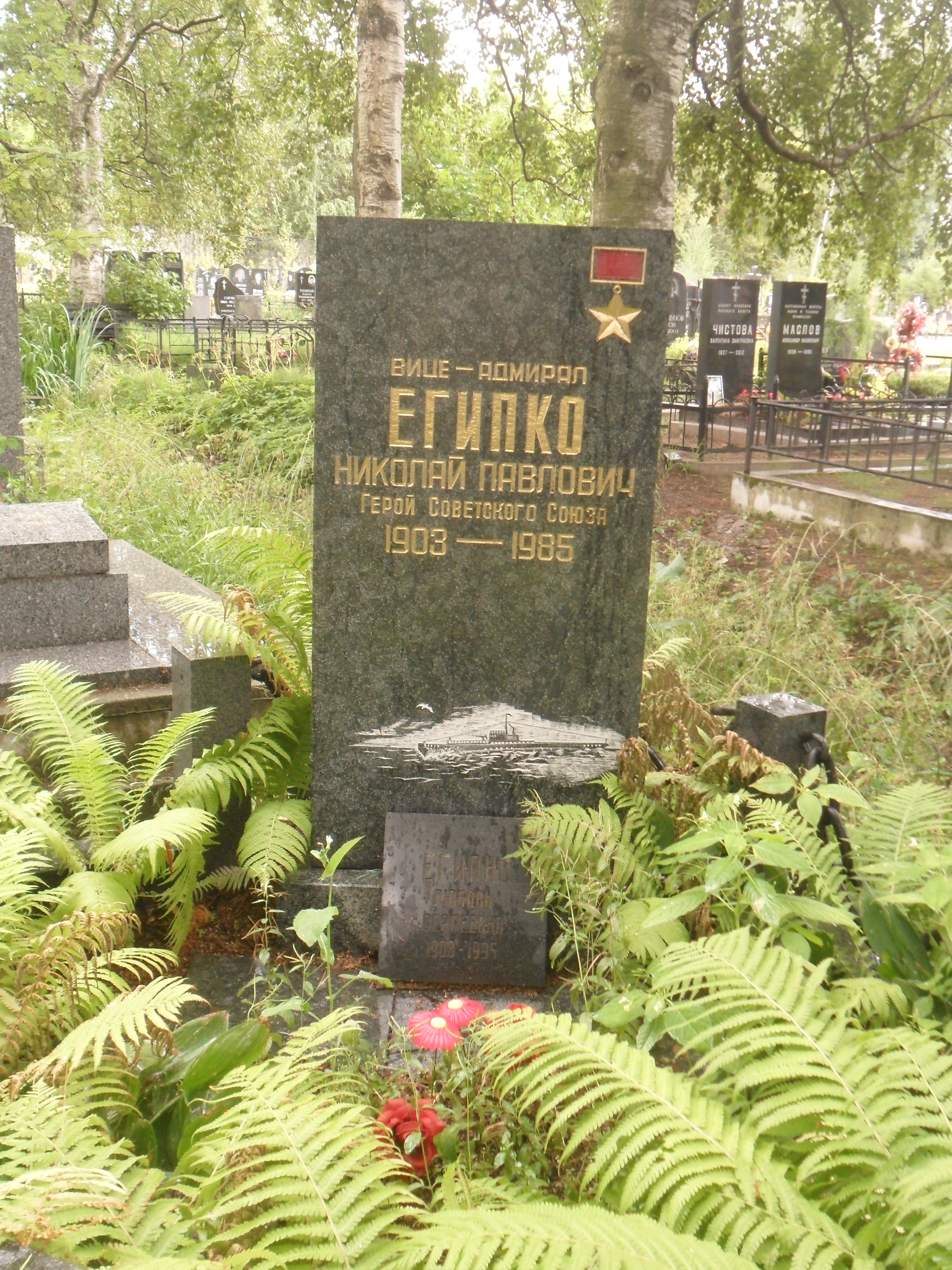
Yegipko's grave in the Serafimovskoe Cemetery in Saint Petersburg

From February 1943 to May 1946 he was head of the department for the External Relations of the USSR's Naval Staff, and from May 1946 to January 1948 he was Acting Deputy Chief of the External Relations Department of the General Staff of the Armed Forces of the USSR. From January 1948 to February 1953, Yegipko was a head of department at the Naval Academy, and from February to August 1953 he was head of the 2nd Baltic Higher Naval School. In August 1953, he became head of the Odessa Higher Naval School, holding this position until March 1955. He had been promoted to rear-admiral on 31 May 1954. Yegipko's next posting was as head of the Higher Naval School of Submarine Navigation from March 1955, holding this position until stepping down in December 1966, having been promoted to vice-admiral on 22 February 1963. He retired from the navy the following month. During his retirement he lived in Leningrad, and died there on 6 July 1985 at the age of 81. He was buried in the city's Serafimovskoe Cemetery, with his obituary appearing in the journal Sovetskii moryak on 13 July 1985. He had completed his memoirs before his death, they were submitted to Voenizdat, but were not published until parts appeared in 2000, and the full manuscript in 2012 under the title My Meridians (Russian: Мои меридианы).

He had married and had two sons and a daughter. His eldest son, Vladimir, followed his father into the navy and rose to captain 1st rank, and taught at the Naval Academy. His younger son, Viktor, had a naval education at the Nakhimov Naval School, but became interested in cybernetics and went into teaching as a Candidate of Sciences. Nikolai Yegipko's daughter Lyudmila married Vladimir Bondarev, a graduate of the Submarine Navigation school, who rose to the rank of rear-admiral.

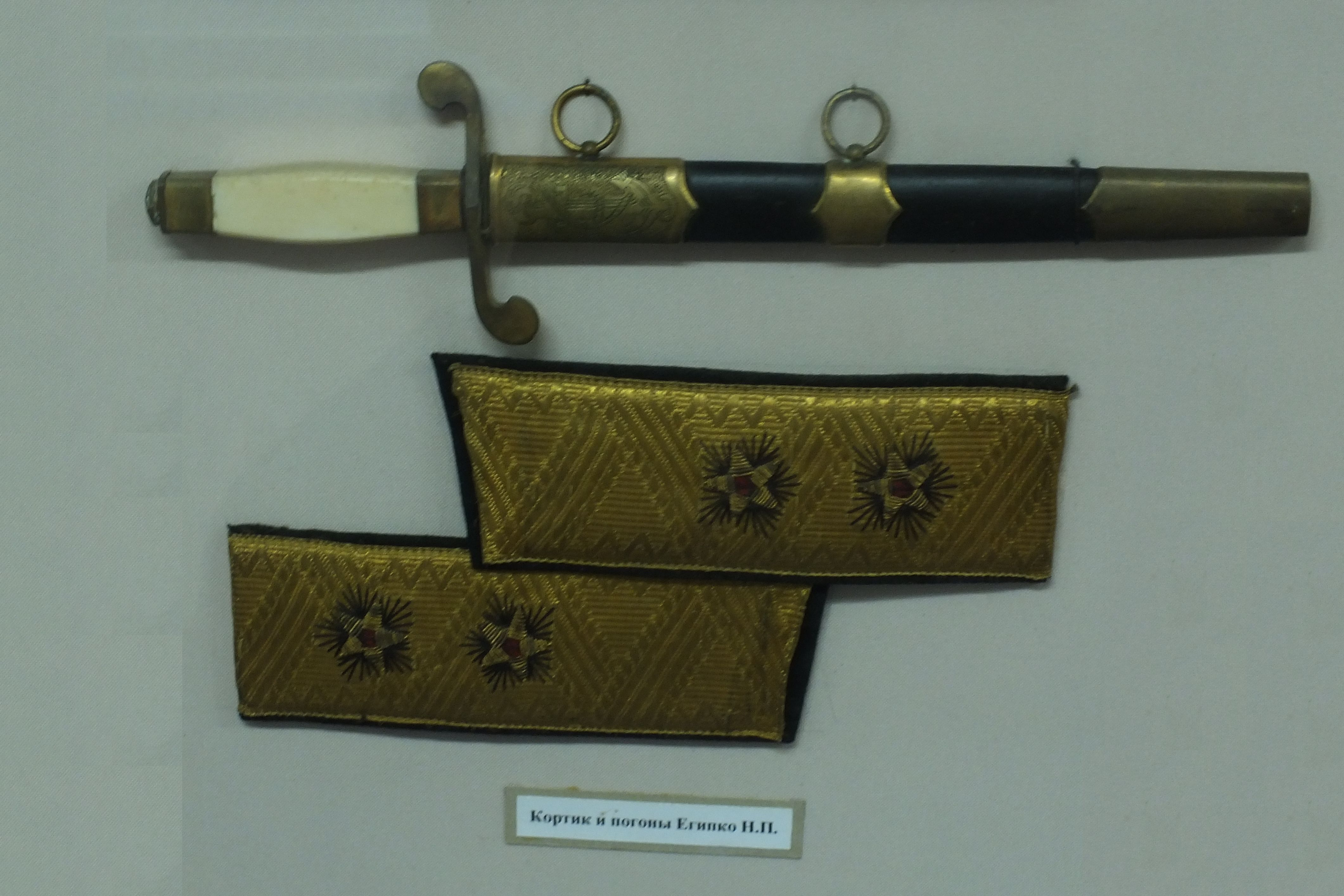
Yegipko's dirk and vice-admiral's epaulettes on display at the S-56 submarine memorial in Vladivostok

Over his long career he had received numerous honours and awards; he was awarded the Order of Lenin three times, on 23 December 1935, 22 February 1939 (as part of his award of Hero of the Soviet Union), and in 1950. He held three Orders of the Red Banner, awarded on 22 December 1937, 11 March 1944 and in 1954; three Orders of the Patriotic War First Class, awarded on 22 July 1944, 8 July 1945 and 11 March 1985; one Order of the Patriotic War Second Class, awarded in 1944, and the Order of the Red Star, awarded on 4 March 1946. He also held several foreign awards, including the Socialist Federal Republic of Yugoslavia's Order of the Partisan Star Second Class, and the Polish Virtuti Militari Fifth Class, both from 1946. On 6 May 1975, with the assistance of several teachers and engineer-captain 1st rank Aleksandra Donchenko, School Number 269, now School Number 585, in Kirovsky District, Leningrad, opened the "N. P. Yegipko Museum of military glory of the submariners of the Baltic." (Russian: Музей боевой славы подводников Балтики им. Н. П. Египко). The museum contains over 2,000 artefacts, and in 2018 a permanent exhibition "The man of legend, Nikolai Pavlovich Yegipko" opened to commemorate the 115th anniversary of his birth.

== Notes ==
a. Yegipko had already made several attempts to sink the Almirante Cervera. The first was when he and C-6's former commander, Ivan Burmistrov, were preparing to hand over command. Two torpedoes were launched but deviated from their course. Yegipko attributed this to old and faulty Italian mechanisms. A second attempt failed when having approached the target, the submarine suddenly dived before the torpedoes could be launched. Yegipko suspected that the helmsman was unwilling to sink a fellow Spanish vessel.
