= Magnitsky =

Magnitsky is a Russian surname of Orthodox clergy. Notable people with the surname include:

- Leonty Magnitsky (1669–1739), Russian mathematician
- Sergei Magnitsky (1972–2009), Russian auditor

== See also ==
- Magnitsky Act
- Magnitsky legislation
