= Arithmetic (book) =

1703 arithmetic textbook by Leonty Magnitsky

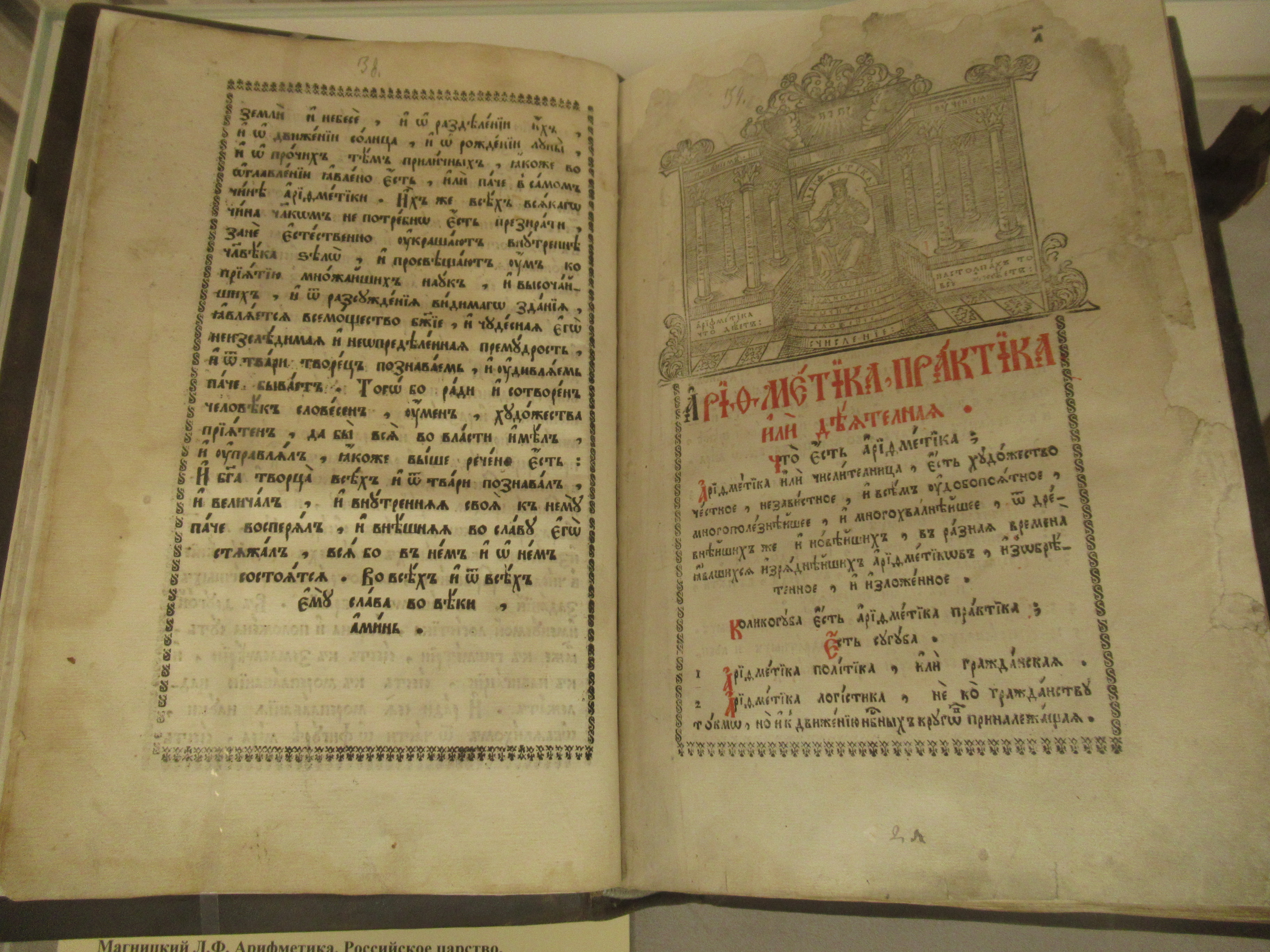
- Author: Leonty Magnitsky
- Original title: Арифметика
- Language: Russian
- Genre: Mathematics
- Publication date: 1703
- Pages: 600

Arithmetic (Russian: Арифметика, romanized: Arifmetika) is a 1703 mathematics textbook by the Russian educator and mathematician Leonty Magnitsky. The book served as the standard Russian mathematics textbook until the mid-18th century. Mikhail Lomonosov was educated on this book, and referred to it as the "gates of my own erudition". It was the first mathematics textbook written in the Russian language that was not a translated edition of a foreign work. It consisted essentially of Magnitsky's own lecture notes, and offered an encyclopedic overview of arithmetic at the time, with sections on navigational astronomy, geodesy, algebra, geometry, and trigonometry.

It was organized in instructive question and answer format, and rooted not in the abstract but in practical and demonstrable applications of theories and axioms. The book also contained astronomical tables and coordinate maps for various Russian locales.

== Production for the School of Navigation ==
The origins of the book lie in Peter the Great's establishment of the School of Navigation in Moscow, and the subsequent appointment of Magnitsky at the school's helm. He needed a text to teach from, and so formulated the book around his lectures and the prevailing European mathematics texts of the age.

== Full title ==
The full title and subtitle reads: "Arithmetic, that is the science of numbering. Translated from different languages into Russian, put together and divided into two parts". The book runs 600 pages. Its publication was extensively researched in 1914 by Dmitrii Galanin in his book Leonty Filippovich Magnitsky and His Arithmetic. Original copies are preserved in the Moscow State University library.

== Gallery ==
Folios from Arithmetic
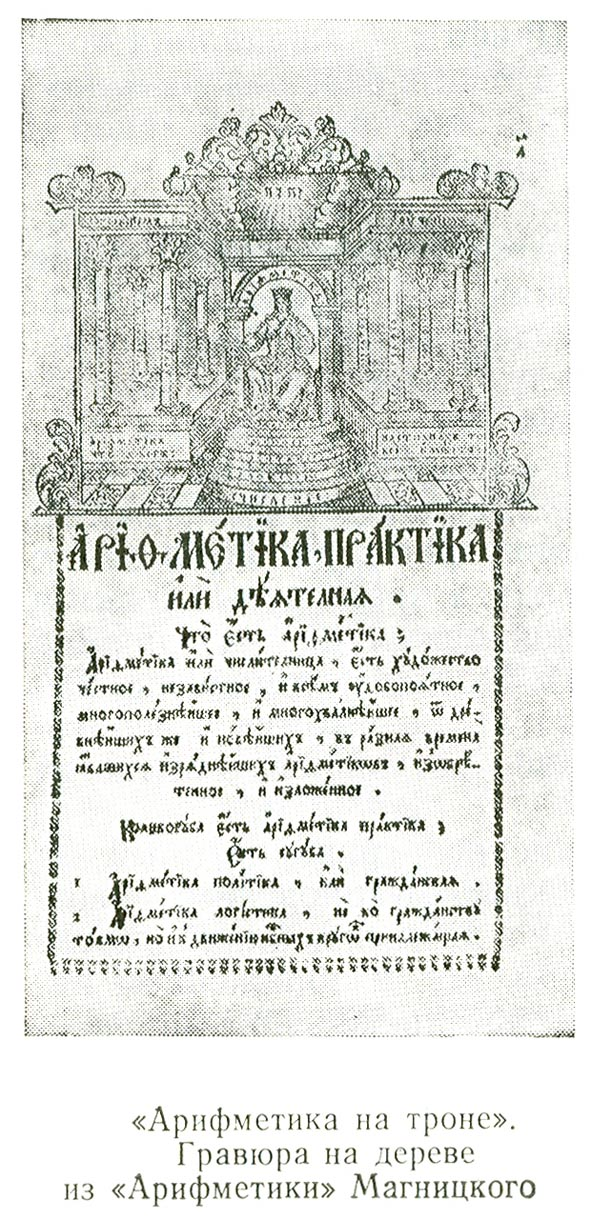

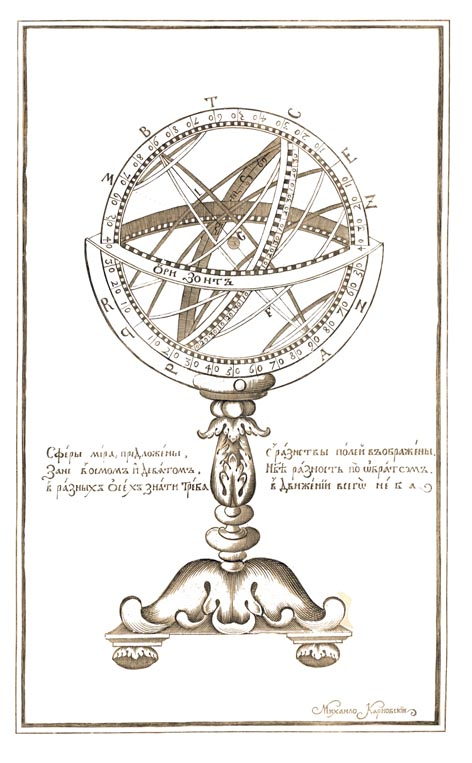

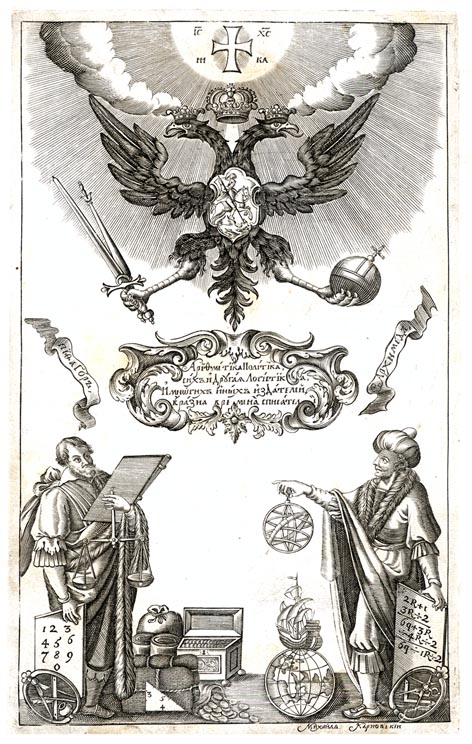

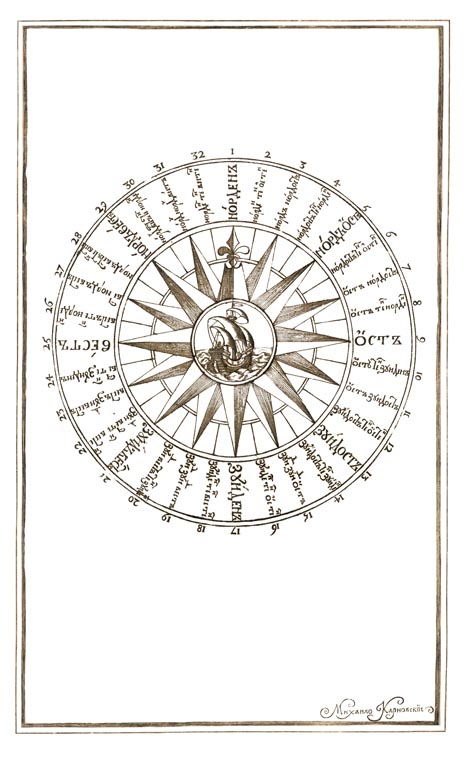

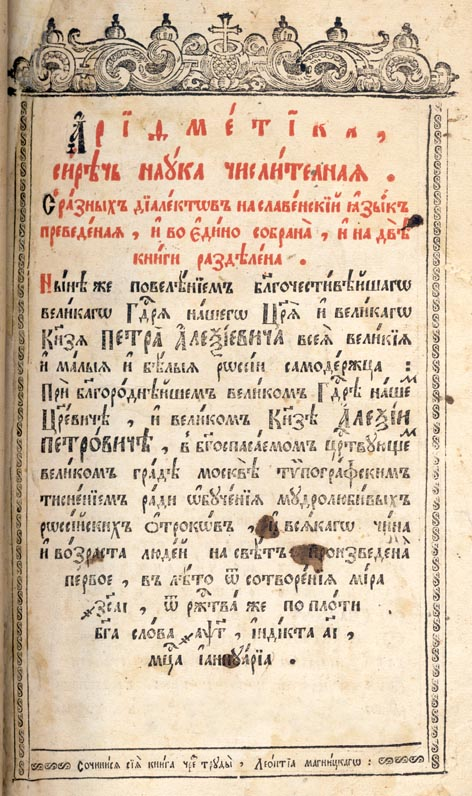
