= Konstantin Kuznetsov =

Soviet naval officer

Konstantin Matveyevich Kuznetsov
- Born: 23 July [O.S. 10 July] 1902; Saint Petersburg, Russian Empire
- Died: 21 July 1977 Leningrad, Soviet Union
- Buried: Serafimovskoe Cemetery
- Allegiance: Soviet Union
- Branch: Soviet Navy
- Service years: 1921-1956
- Rank: Rear-Admiral
- Conflicts: Russian Civil War; Winter War; Second World War
- Awards: Order of Lenin (twice); Order of the Red Banner (twice); Order of Nakhimov Second Class; Order of the Patriotic War First Class (twice); Order of the Red Star

Konstantin Matveyevich Kuznetsov (Russian: Константин Матвеевич Кузнецов; 23 July [O.S. 10 July] 1902 – 21 July 1977) was an officer of the Soviet Navy. He reached the rank of rear-admiral and saw service in the Russian Civil War, the Winter War, and the Second World War.

Born in 1902, Kuznetsov joined the Bolshevik forces during the Russian Civil War, initially fighting with the Red Army, and then from 1922 with the Red Navy. After a brief period in the Arctic, he undertook his early service and training with the Black Sea Fleet, where he served on submarines. Transferring to the Pacific Fleet in the early 1930s, he was given his own commands, eventually rising to staff positions. He was arrested for a time and dismissed from the navy during the Great Purge, but was reinstated and after service with the Baltic Fleet, was appointed deputy head of the submarine department of the navy's combat training department, and was serving in this role at the Axis invasion of the Soviet Union in June 1941.

On the outbreak of war, Kuznetsov visited the submarines at the naval bases to direct operations. He wrote instructions on submarine tactics for distribution to commanders in the field, and studied methods of anti-submarine defence. In 1943, he was appointed deputy head of the navy's submarine navigation department. He went on to command a number of naval bases, first the Osinovetskaya naval base of the Ladoga Military Flotilla, then the Baltic Naval Base, and finally the Libau Naval Base. He received numerous awards for his wartime service, and entered a mostly academic life after the war, serving as head of the Leningrad Naval Preparatory School, the M. V. Frunze Higher Naval School, a deputy head of the Naval Academy, and head of the Higher Naval School of Submarine Navigation.

== Early years and education ==
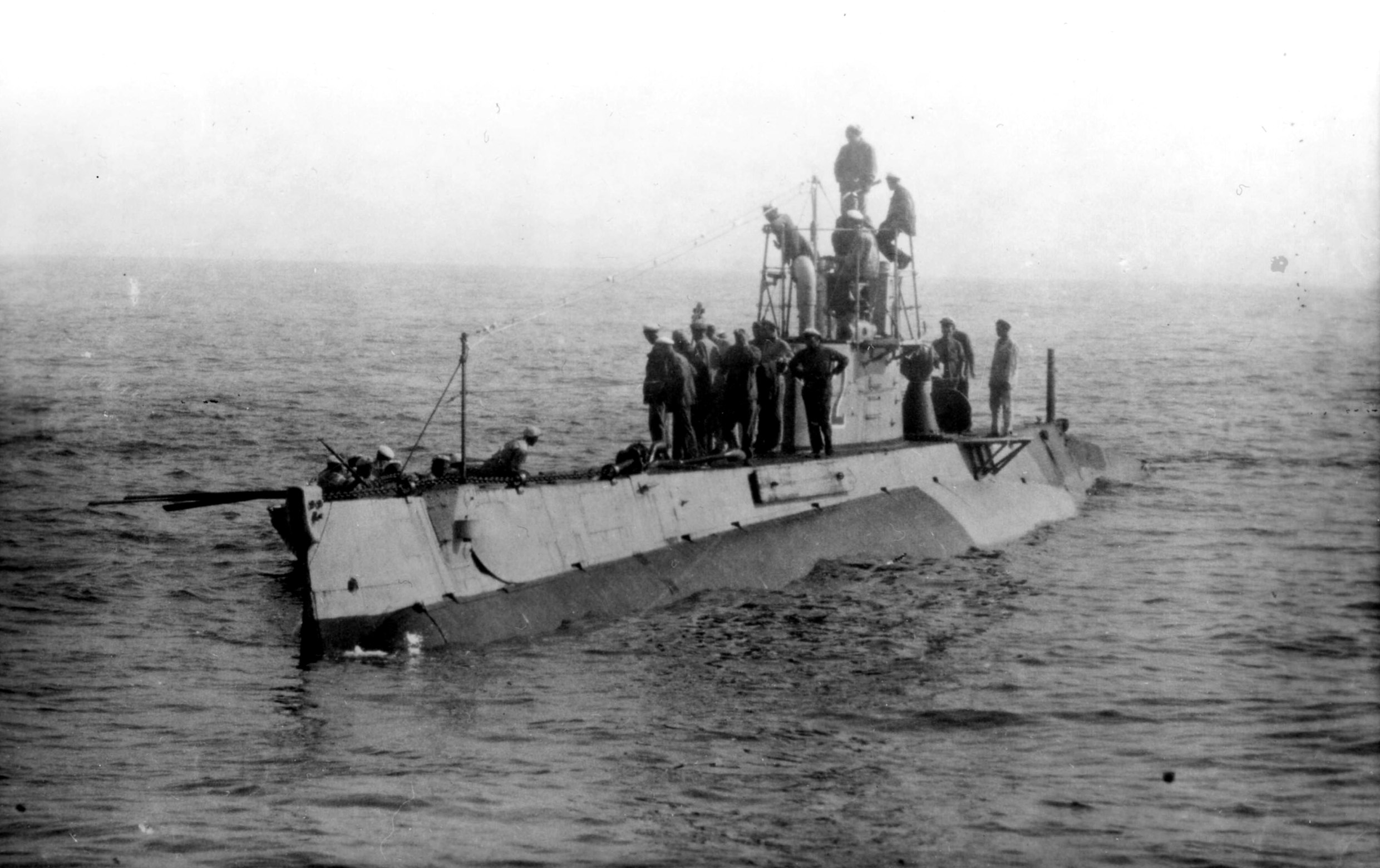
The submarine Shakhtyor, Kuznetsov's first command

Kuznetsov was born on 23 July [O.S. 10 July] 1902 in Saint Petersburg, in the Russian Empire. He joined up for service in the Red Army in 1921, and saw action in the Russian Civil War as part of the Forces of Special Purpose. He switched branches in March 1922, joining the Red Navy and being sent to the Arkhangelsk naval detachment. He was soon redeployed to the Black Sea, as a sailor in the Black Sea Fleet's 1st Integrated School in June 1922, and from March 1923, serving as a mine specialist aboard the Black Sea Fleet minelayer 1 Maya. He enrolled as a cadet in the 1st Integrated School in October 1923, joining the All-Union Communist Party (Bolsheviks) that year. In March 1924, he was appointed senior mine specialist aboard the 1 Maya.

Kuznetsov returned to his hometown, now renamed Leningrad, in July 1924, and enrolled as a cadet in the M. V. Frunze Naval School. After graduating from its courses, he returned to the Black Sea Fleet and was appointed acting navigator aboard the submarine Marxist in October 1927. He took the Black Sea Fleet's special command classes from October 1929 to October 1930, being appointed senior assistant commander of the submarine Shakhtyor in May 1930, and then her commander from May 1931. A reassignment to the Pacific Fleet followed, with Kuznetsov taking command of the submarine Shch-105 in November 1932.

In October 1934, Kuznetsov was appointed a division commander in the Pacific Fleet, then in April 1936, chief of staff of the fleet's 2nd Submarine Brigade, becoming its acting commander in September 1936. He was awarded the Order of Lenin that year for his work in putting the submarines through combat training. In April 1937, he was appointed chief of the 7th department of the Pacific Fleet headquarters, and then in December 1937, he became commander of the fleet's 1st Submarine Brigade, with the rank of captain 2nd rank. On 8 April 1938, during the Great Purge, he was arrested and then dismissed from the navy on 9 May 1938. He was reinstated in June 1939. He returned to the Black Sea Fleet as commander of a training detachment of submarines, before in August 1939, joining the Baltic Fleet as acting-commander of its 1st Submarine Brigade. He was confirmed as its commander on 2 February 1940, and went on to see action in the Winter War in this role. He was awarded the Order of the Red Star in 1940 for his combat service. On 13 May 1941, Kuznetsov was appointed deputy head of the submarine department of the navy's combat training department, and was serving in this role at the Axis invasion of the Soviet Union in June 1941.

== Wartime service ==
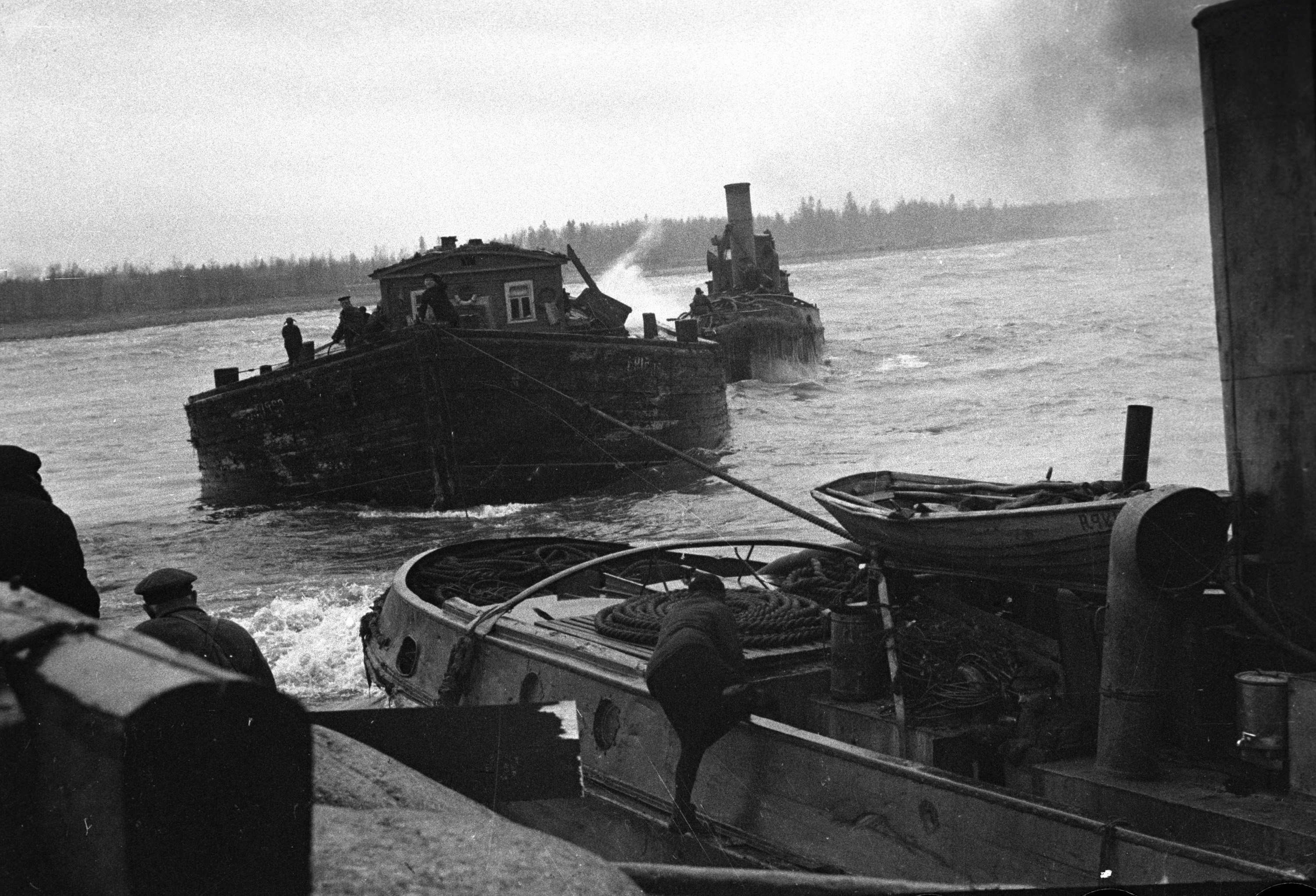
Transporting supplies to Leningrad across Lake Ladoga. As commander of the lake's Osinovetskaya naval base, Kuznetsov was heavily involved in naval operations.

On the outbreak of war, Kuznetsov visited the submarines at the naval bases to direct operations, in the Baltic, Northern and Black Sea Fleets. He wrote instructions on submarine tactics for distribution to commanders in the field, and studied methods of anti-submarine defence. He wrote a "Guide to the Self-Defence of Merchant Ships" for the Soviet merchant fleet. On 26 January 1943, he was appointed deputy head of the navy's submarine navigation department. On 15 July 1943, he was nominated for the Order of the Patriotic War First Class for his wartime work. Later in 1943, he was appointed commander of the Osinovetskaya naval base of the Ladoga Military Flotilla. He carried out offensive and defensive operations during the siege of Leningrad, organising reconnaissance and raiding operations, and attacking enemy artillery positions. He was awarded the Order of the Patriotic War, 1st Class on 8 July 1944. In August 1944, Kuznetsov was appointed commander of the Baltic Naval Base, and on 3 November that year was awarded the Order of the Red Banner. He was moved shortly afterwards, on 27 November, to command the Libau Naval Base. From this position on the Baltic coastline, he supported the Red Army flank during advances along the Karelian Isthmus, and attacking German sea communication lines between Windau, Libau and Danzig. He ended the war in this position, receiving the Order of Nakhimov Second Class on 20 July 1945, the Medal "For the Capture of Königsberg" on 30 March 1946, and the Medal "For the Victory over Germany in the Great Patriotic War 1941–1945" on 29 July 1946.

== Post-war life ==
Kuznetsov entered a mostly academic life after the war, being appointed head of the Leningrad Naval Preparatory School in 1946, and then of the M. V. Frunze Higher Naval School in 1947. In 1951 he became deputy head of the Naval Academy, and from 1953 until he retired in 1956, he was head of the Higher Naval School of Submarine Navigation. He died on 21 July 1977 and was buried in Leningrad's Serafimovskoe Cemetery.

== Honours and awards ==
Over his career Kuznetsov received the Order of Lenin twice, the Order of the Red Banner twice, the Order of Nakhimov Second Class, the Order of the Patriotic War First Class twice, the Order of the Red Star, and various other medals.
