= Vasily Kipriyanov =

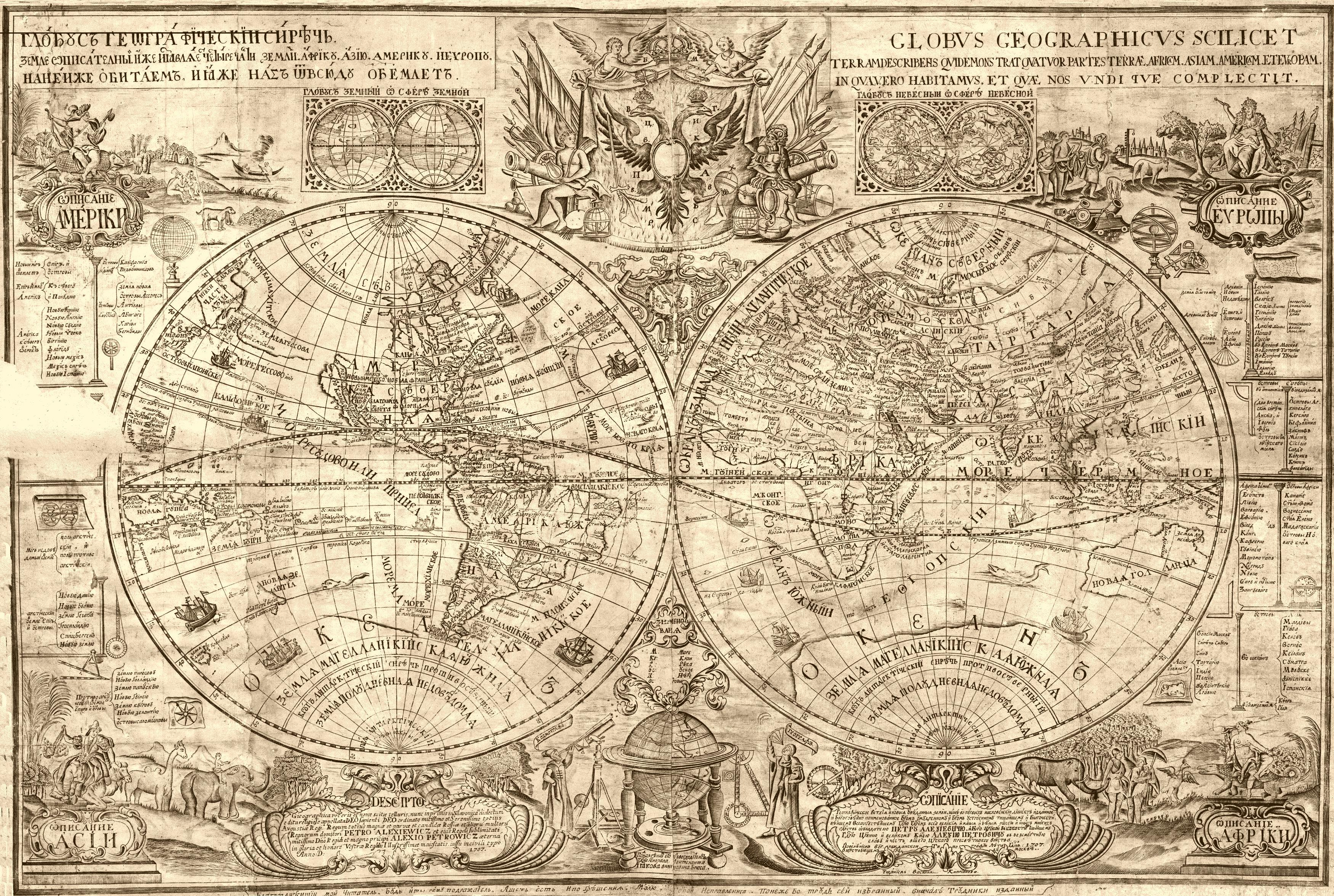
Map of the World published by Kipriyanov

Vasily Onufrievich Kipriyanov (Russian: Василий Анофриевич Киприянов; ? - after 1723) was a publisher and librarian from the Tsardom of Russia. He was at the head of the "Civil Publishing House" under the general supervision of Jacob Bruce. It was the first Russian private publishing house (established by the special order of Peter I of May 30, 1705).

He grew up in the area of Kadashevskaya Sloboda (now in the modern district of Yakimanka District within Moscow), and during his youth engaged in trade by supplying candles, leather, and lard to the Armory Chamber and the Printing Yard. In 1701, he first started working with mathematician Leonty Magnitsky to engrave his publication, before going on to edit other mathematical books.
