= Higher Naval School of Submarine Navigation =

Russian naval education institution

Coordinates: 59°54′40″N 30°17′35″E

- Высшее военно-морское училище подводного плавания имени Ленинского Комсомола
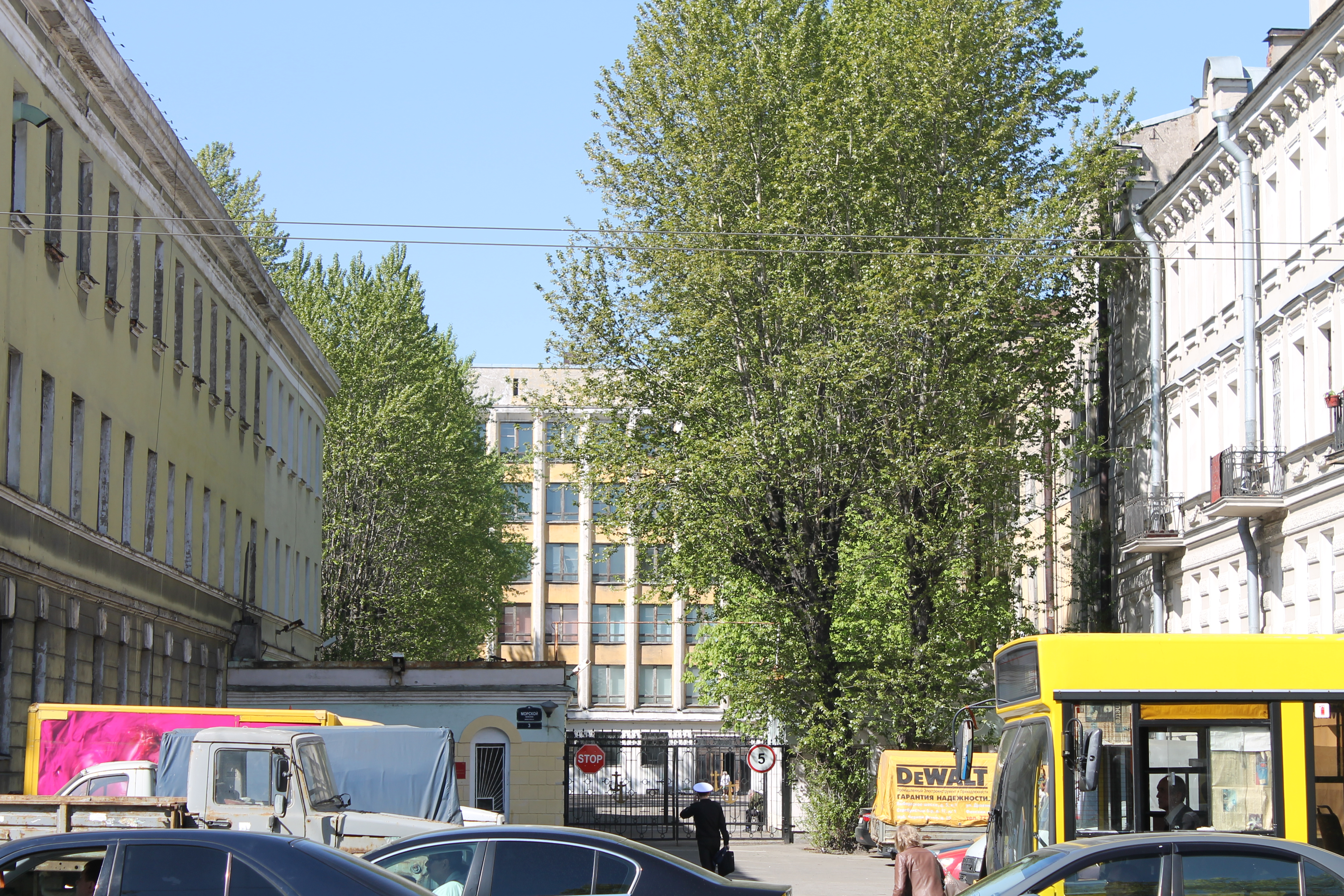
- Former names: Leningrad Naval Preparatory School (1944-1948); 1st Baltic Higher Naval School (1948-1954); 1st Higher Naval School of Submarine Navigation (1954-1958)
- Type: Military commissioning school
- Active: 1944–1998
- Location: 3 Morskoy Lane, Saint Petersburg, Russia

The Higher Naval School of Submarine Navigation, formally the Higher Naval School of Submarine Navigation named after Leninsky Komsomol (Russian: Высшее военно-морское училище подводного плавания имени Ленинского Комсомола), was a higher naval education institution in Saint Petersburg which prepared prospective officers for commissions in the Soviet and later Russian Navy.

The school opened during the later stages of the Second World War as the Leningrad Naval Preparatory School, to train candidates for service in the Soviet Navy. After four years of operation it was renamed the 1st Baltic Higher Naval School with an expanded four-year training curriculum to produce watch officers for the navy. By the early 1950s it had begun to specialise in submarine training, and in 1954 it was renamed the 1st Higher Naval School of Submarine Navigation, and increasingly focussed on training officers for service in the Soviet Navy's expanding submarine forces. Education concentrated on the new submarine types and technologies entering service, and the heads of the school and many of the teachers were drawn from experienced former submariners. In 1958, the school was given the name Leninsky Komsomol, commemorating the 40th anniversary of the founding of the Komsomol, and 1960, transitioned to a five-year training curriculum.

The school continued to function during the years of glasnost and perestroika, and after the dissolution of the Soviet Union in 1991, when it became an educational institution of the Russian Navy. It suffered from the dislocation of the 1990s, experiencing a drop in recruitment, and shortages in funding. In 1998, the Higher Naval School of Submarine Navigation was merged with the M. V. Frunze Higher Naval School to create the Saint Petersburg Naval Institute. Over its years of operation, more than a hundred graduates of the school became admirals, and 16 officers were awarded the title of Hero of the Soviet Union or Hero of the Russian Federation.

== History ==
=== Leningrad Naval Preparatory School (1944-1948) ===
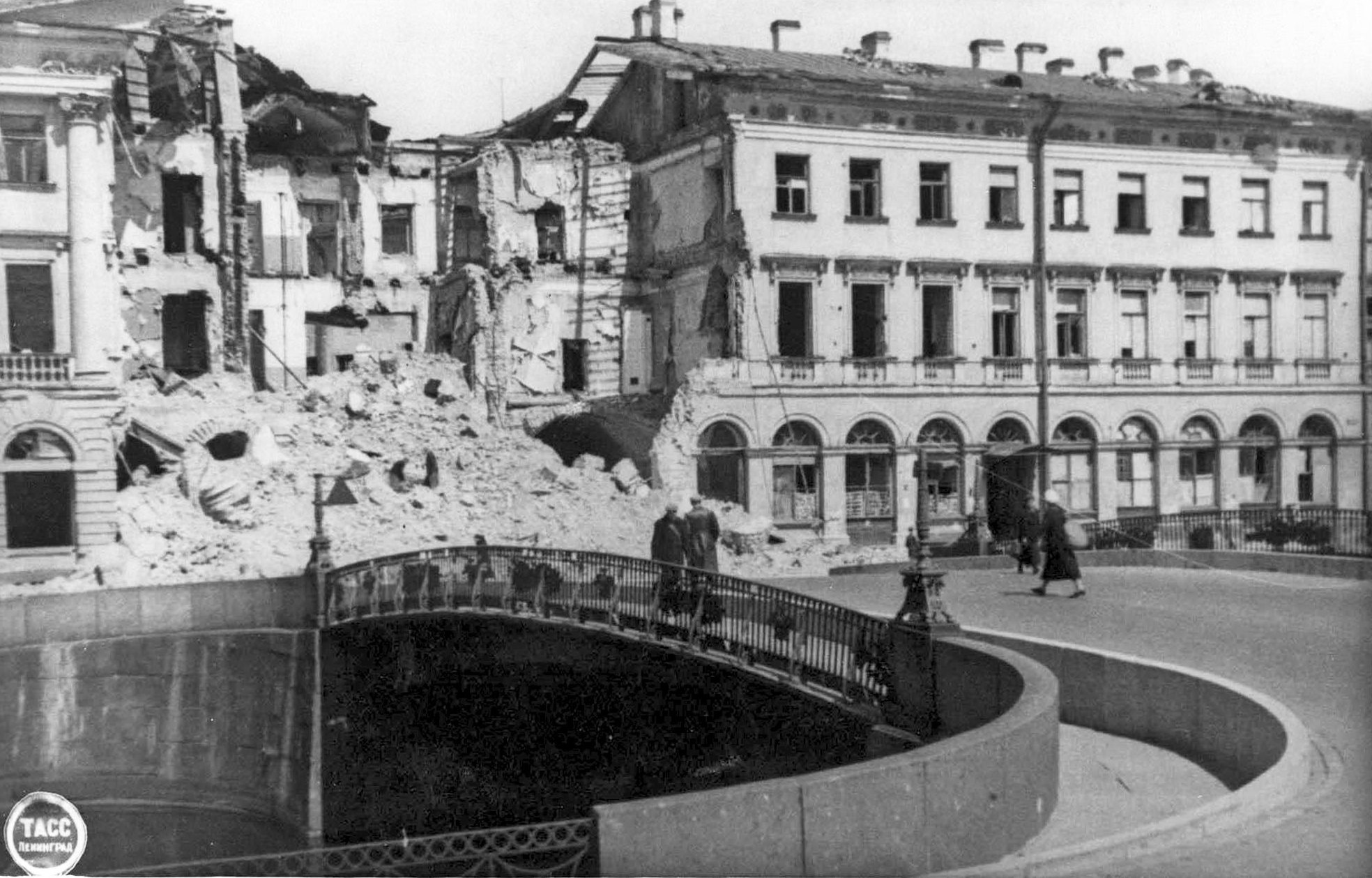
The siege of Leningrad. The school was established in the war-damaged city in 1944, as Soviet naval capabilities increased.

The school was established in the later stages of the Second World War, by which point Soviet advances were pushing Axis forces out of coastal areas and Soviet naval activity was steadily increasing. With new surface ships and submarines active in all of the fleets, the pre-war system of naval education was deemed to be no longer adequate to meet demand. The government adopted a new resolution on 31 March 1944, to organize new naval preparatory schools under the supervision of the People's Commissariat of the Navy. One such school was opened as the Leningrad Naval Preparatory School. The City Council of Workers' Deputies assigned the premises of the former 1st and 12th secondary schools, and the House of Pioneers, a former orphanage on Priyutsky Lane, later Morskoy Lane.

The school was established by the 30 April 1944 order of the People's Commissar of the Navy. It was based on two disbanded special naval schools, the 2nd Leningrad, which had been evacuated to the Siberian town of Tara, and the 1st Moscow. Captain 1st Rank Nikolai Avraamov was appointed its first head, to oversee the development of a three-year training curriculum. The buildings assigned to the school had suffered from bombing and shelling during the siege of Leningrad, but repairs to some of the classrooms and sleeping quarters, the dining hall, the infirmary, and the gym were carried out before the first school year began on 9 October 1944. On 28 April 1945, the school received its banner from the Presidium of the Supreme Soviet of the Soviet Union. Students received an education in mathematics, physics, chemistry, literature and Russian language, history and geography, foreign languages, physical education, and naval affairs. Practical lessons were carried out aboard the school's two training ships, the schooners Ucheba and Nadezhda. Of the more than one thousand graduates of the school during the four years of its existence, many went on to further studies in the M. V. Frunze Higher Naval School, or in other naval training institutes.

=== 1st Baltic Higher Naval School (1948-1954) ===
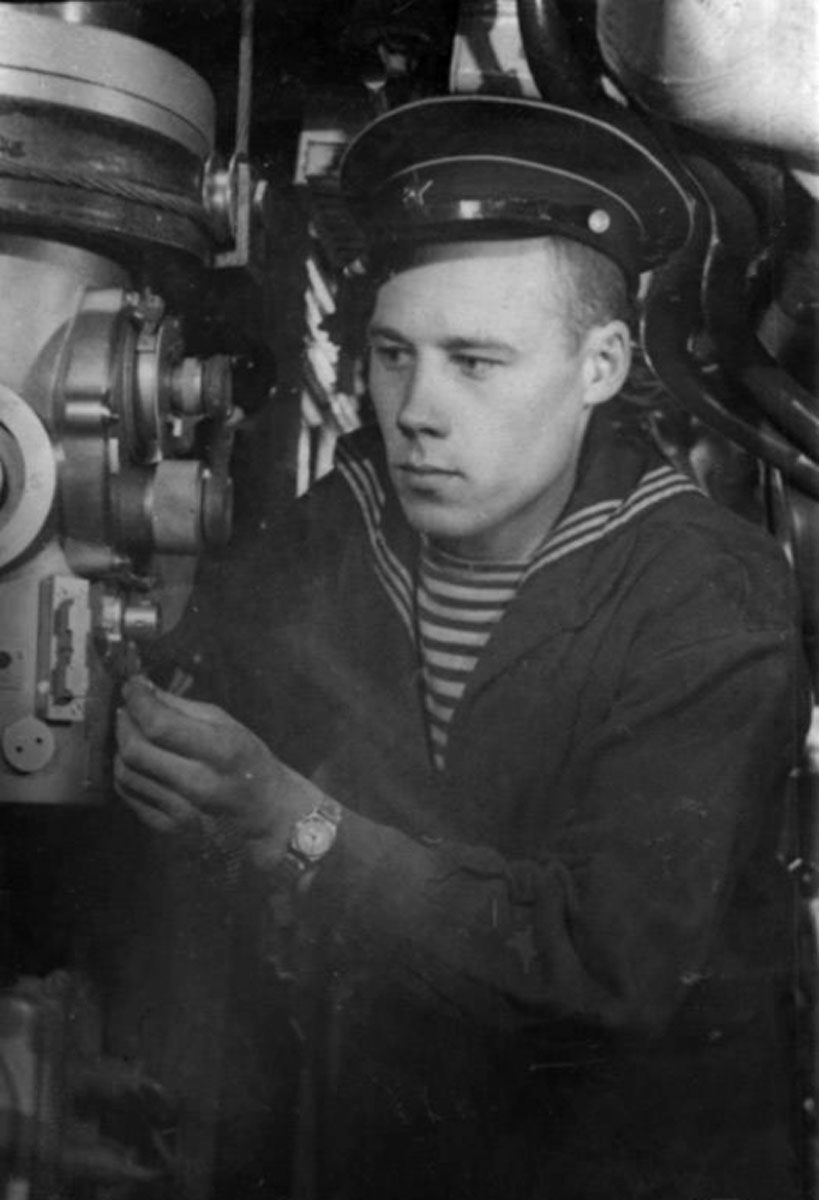
By the late 1940s the school was graduating recruits trained for service in the latest ships and vessels.

By 1948, the Soviet Navy was being expanded and there was increased demand for officers. The 8 April 1948 order of the Minister of the Armed Forces directed the Leningrad Naval Preparatory School to be renamed the 1st Baltic Higher Naval School and to develop a four-year training curriculum to produce watch officers for the navy. Captain 1st Rank Boris Nikitin, who had been head of the Preparatory School since August 1947, was appointed head of the new school. New courses were established in higher mathematics, physics, ship theory and structure, navigation and sailing, nautical astronomy, hydrometeorology, artillery and explosives, foreign languages, physical training and others. New classrooms and laboratories were built to provide training in the new curriculum. Cadets from the school marched in the May Day parade on Red Square in Moscow in 1950, and again in 1952. The school's premises were developed with a new building designed by architect David Buryshkin at 40 12th Krasnoarmeyskaya Street, built in the Stalinist style between 1950 and 1956.

=== 1st Higher Naval School of Submarine Navigation (1954-1958) ===
The Soviet Navy had steadily increased its submarine forces following the end of the Second World War, and the increasing sophistication and complexity of the new types entering service required increasingly specialised training of sailors and officers. The 1st Baltic Higher Naval School had begun to specialise in submarine training by September 1953, when the navigation and mine-torpedo faculties were inaugurated. Specialized officer classes were established in November 1953 to train commanders, assistant commanders and commanders of navigation and mine-torpedo departments for submarines, with the school becoming the main source of personnel for the submarine fleet. In recognition of these developments, Order No. 00185 of the Commander-in-Chief of the Navy on 3 May 1954, renamed the school as the 1st Higher Naval School of Submarine Navigation. In 1953, Rear-Admiral Konstantin Kuznetsov, an experienced submariner, was appointed head of the school. He was succeeded in 1955 by Rear-Admiral Nikolai Yegipko, who had also commanded submarines. In keeping with the new specialisation, many of the teaching staff and heads of faculties were drawn from officers who had served aboard submarines.

=== Higher Naval School of Submarine Navigation named after Leninsky Komsomol ===
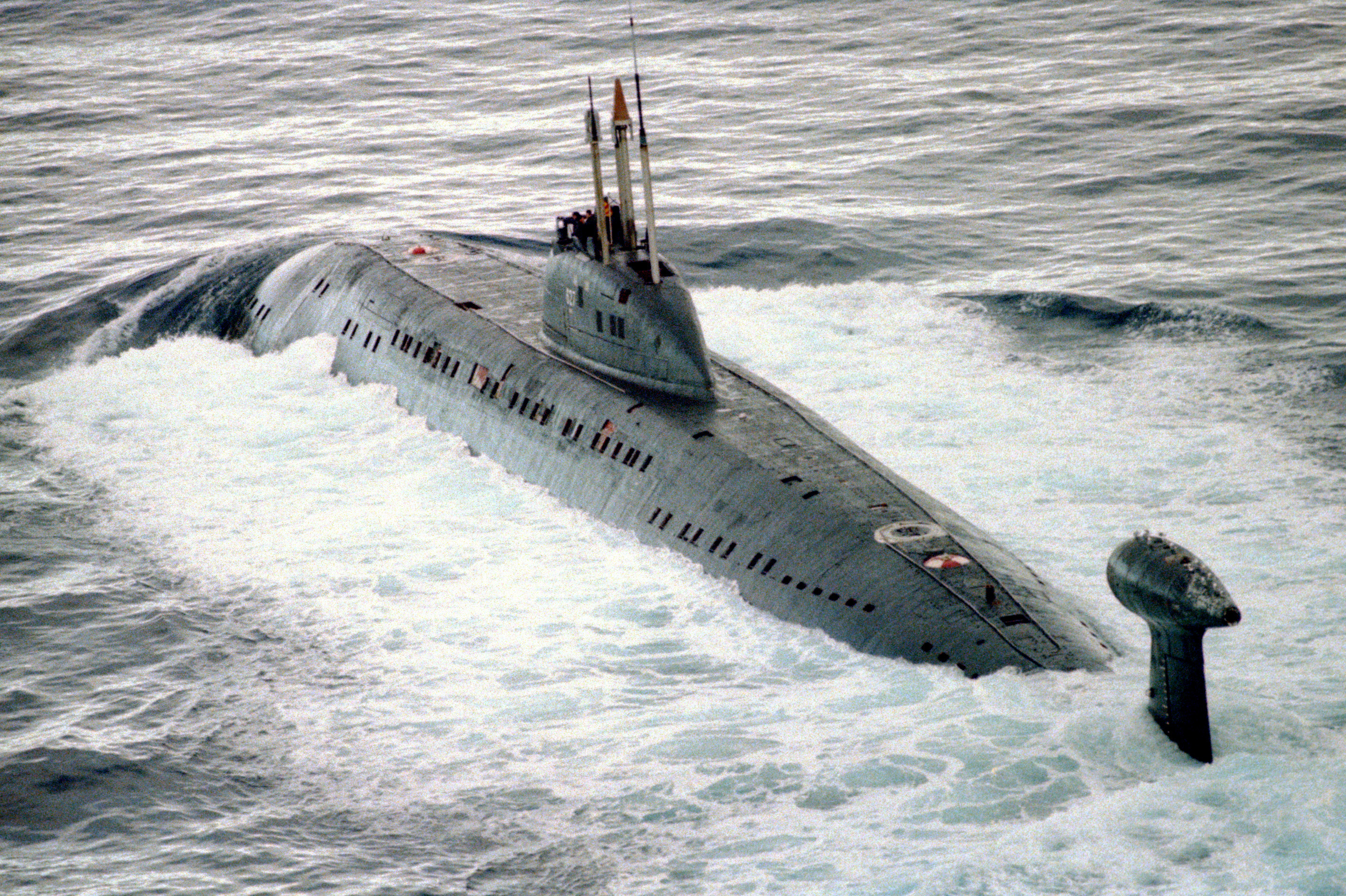
A Victor-III-class submarine underway. By the late Soviet period, the school had become the main source of personnel for the submarine fleet.

In 1958, the school was given the name Leninsky Komsomol, commemorating the 40th anniversary of the founding of the Komsomol. In 1960, the school transitioned to a five-year training curriculum, and continued to develop teaching and training methods to keep up with the new technologies being introduced into the submarine fleet. In December 1966, Rear-Admiral Pavel Paromoshkin was appointed head of the school. He served as such until 1973, when he was succeeded by Vice-Admiral Georgy Nevolin. In late 1984, submariner and Hero of the Soviet Union, Rear-Admiral Yegor Tomko was appointed head of the school. The school continued to function during the years of glasnost and perestroika, and after the dissolution of the Soviet Union in 1991, when it became an educational institution of the Russian Navy. Vice-Admiral Tomko retired in February 1992, and was succeeded by Rear-Admiral Bogdan Malyarchuk. With the dissolution of the Soviet Union, some staff and students in naval schools outside Russia, but who wished to continue to serve in the Russian Navy, transferred to the school. This happened with the transfer of the Caspian Higher Naval School to Azerbaijan in 1992, and the Nakhimov Black Sea Higher Naval School to Ukraine in 1993. Despite this the school suffered from the dislocation of the 1990s, experiencing a drop in recruitment, and shortages in funding.

In Decree No. 1009 of the Government of the Russian Federation on 29 August 1998, the Higher Naval School of Submarine Navigation was ordered to be merged with the M. V. Frunze Higher Naval School to create the Saint Petersburg Naval Institute, which in 2001 was named the Peter the Great Naval Corps - Saint Petersburg Naval Institute to commemorate the 300th anniversary of naval education in Russia. Over its years of operation, more than a hundred graduates of the school became admirals, and 16 officers were awarded the title of Hero of the Soviet Union or Hero of the Russian Federation.

== Commanders ==
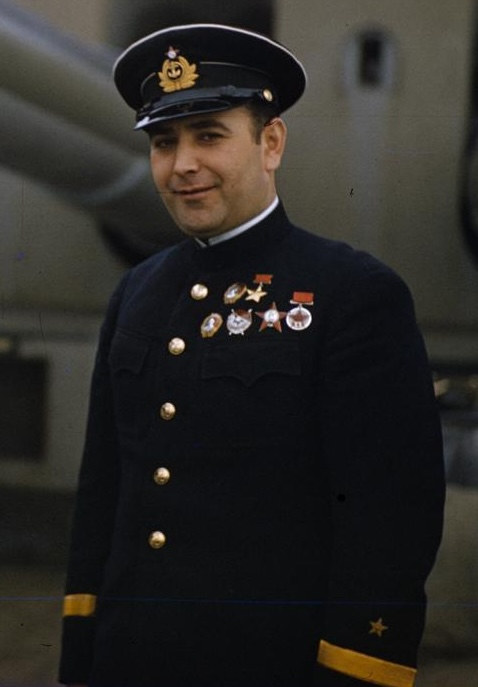
Nikolai Yegipko, head of the school between 1955 and 1966

- Captain 1st rank Nikolai Avraamov (1944–1947)
- Rear-Admiral Boris Nikitin (1947–1953)
- Rear-Admiral Konstantin Kuznetsov (1953–1955)
- Vice-Admiral Nikolai Yegipko (1955–1966)
- Vice-Admiral Pavel Paromoshkin (1966–1973)
- Vice-Admiral Georgy Nevolin (1973–1984)
- Vice-Admiral Yegor Tomko (1984–1992)
- Rear-Admiral Bogdan Malyarchuk (1992–1998)
