= Museum of Moscow =

Museum in Moscow, Russia

- Музей Москвы
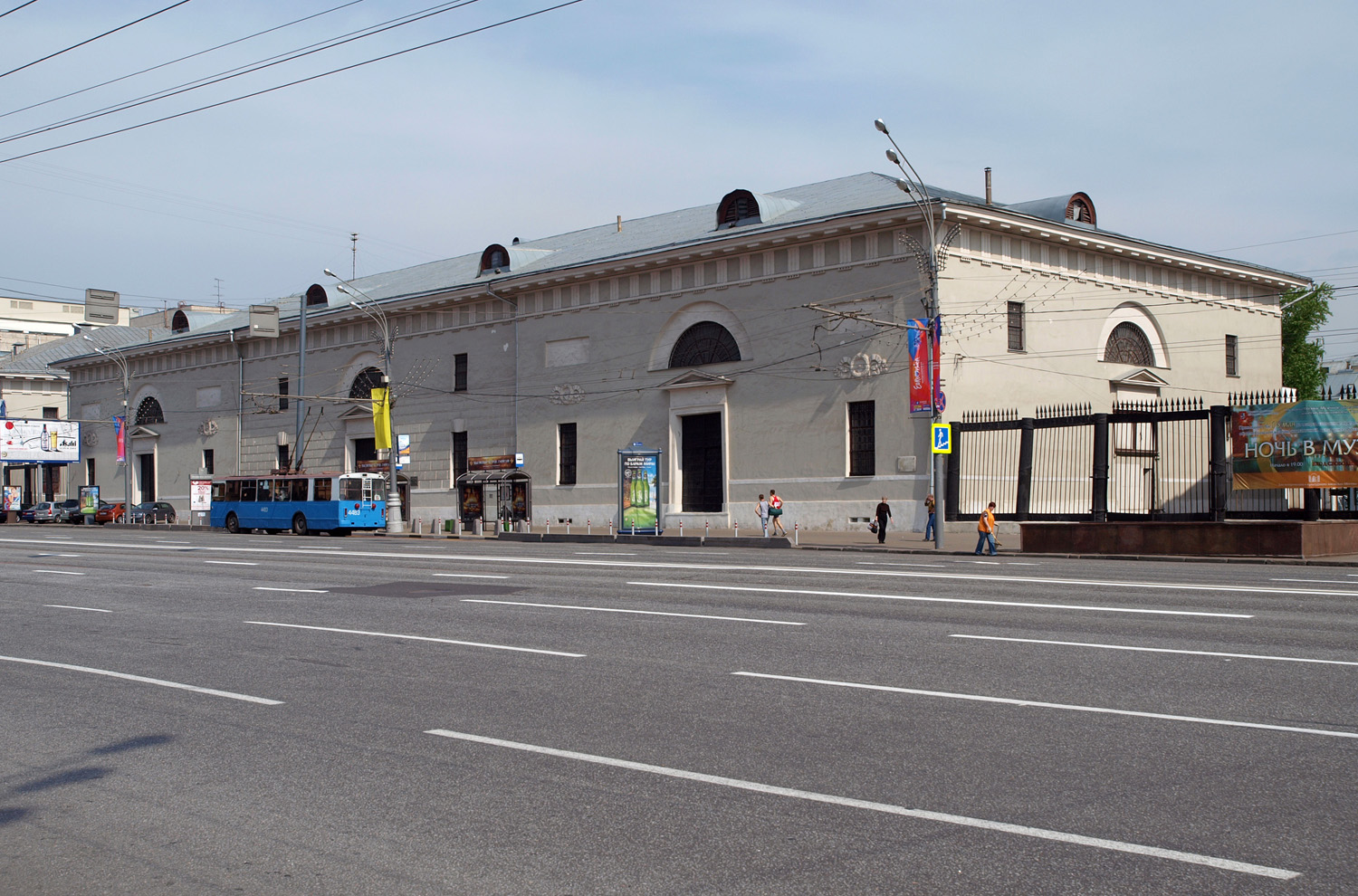
- Former foods warehouse on Zubovsky Boulevard

- Location within Moscow
- Established: 1896
- Location: Moscow, Russia
- Coordinates: 55.7367°N 37.5933°E
- Website: mosmuseum.ru

The Museum of Moscow (Russian: Музей Москвы) is one of the oldest museums of the city of Moscow, Russia. Its collection showcases the history and the development of the City of Moscow.

Museum collection was established on the initiative of Russian scientific community in 1896. The Moscow City Duma gave it a large collection of exhibits. The museum was originally named Museum of City Economy (Музей городского хозяйства) and was housed in the Krestovsky water towers. Its collection was based on the exhibits of the Moscow pavilion at the All-Russia Exhibition 1896, which was held in Nizhny Novgorod.

In the 20th century the museum several times changed its name and location. In 1921 the museum was renamed Moscow Municipal Museum (Московский коммунальный музей) and was moved to the Sukharev Tower. After the demolition of the tower in 1935, the museum was moved to the Church of John the Theologian on the Novaya Ploshchad square. At the same time, the main topic of the exhibition became the reconstruction of Moscow according to the 1935 Reconstruction Plan. In 1940, it was renamed the Museum of the Reconstruction and Development of Moscow (Музей реконструкции и развития Москвы), In 1986, the museum was renamed Museum of Moscow History (Музей истории Москвы). In 2009, the Museum was moved to the former foods warehouse on Zubovsky Boulevard and at the same time renamed the Moscow Museum.

== Gallery ==
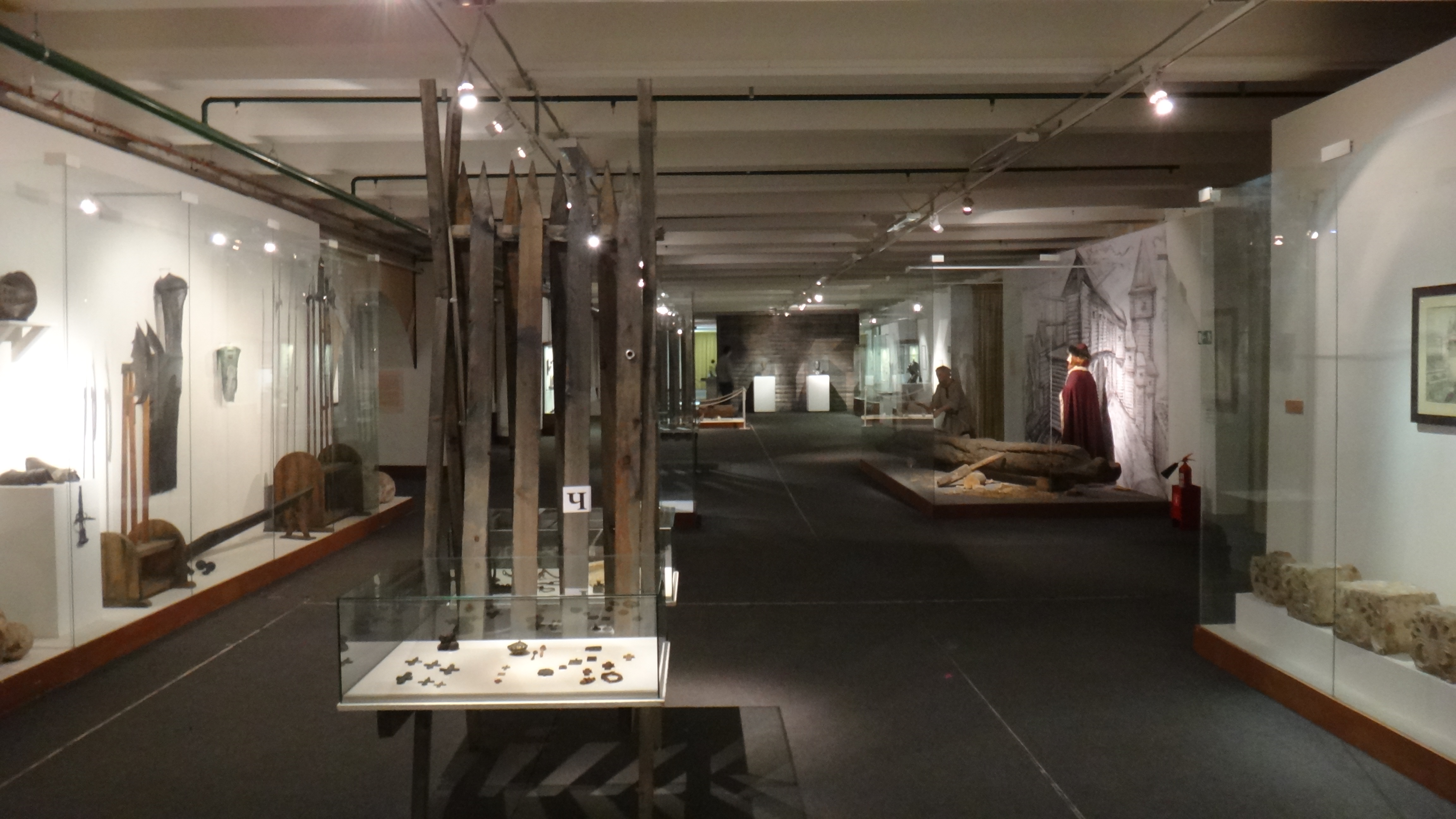
Exhibition in the museum

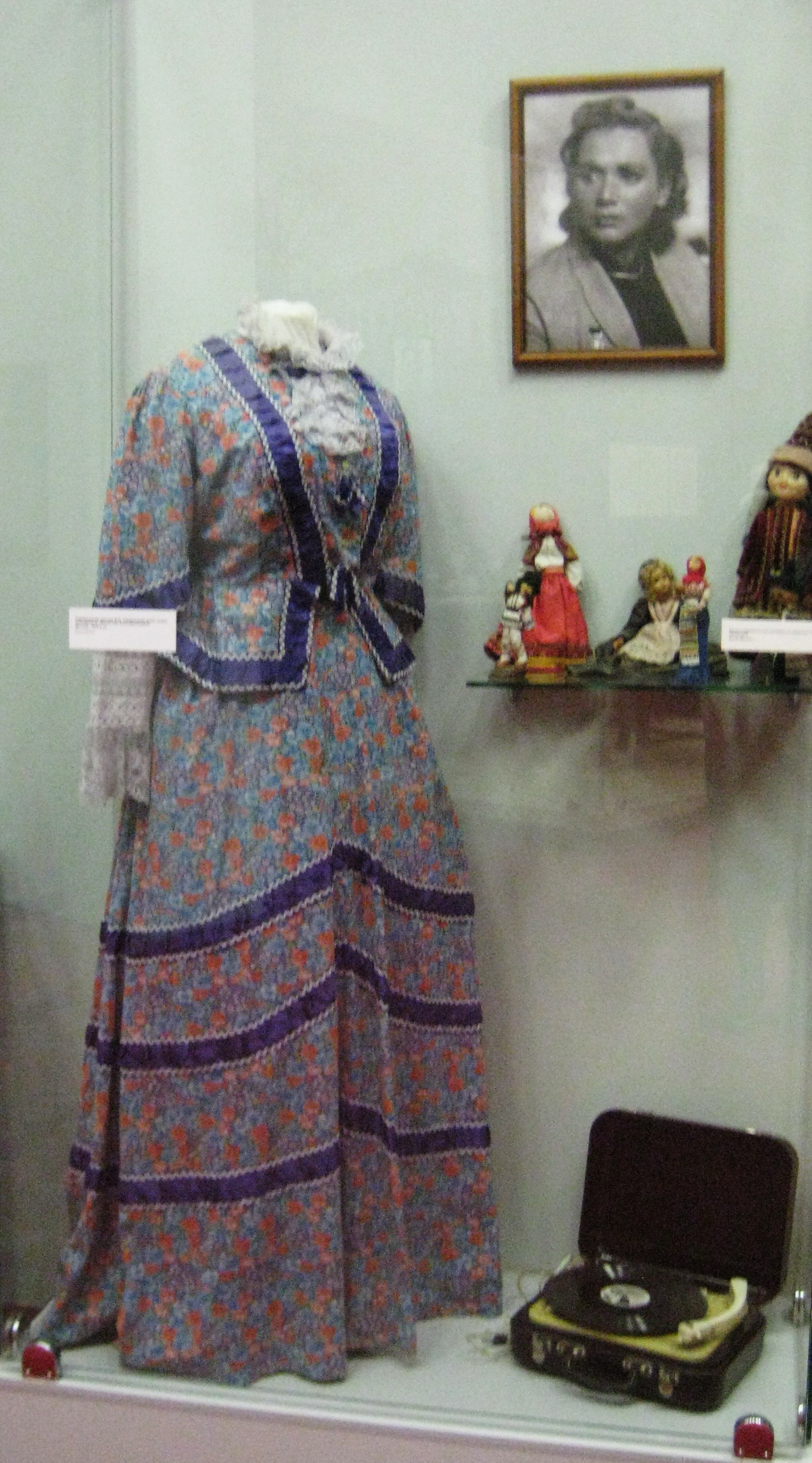
Personal items of Lidiya Smirnova
