= Soviet submarine S-117 =

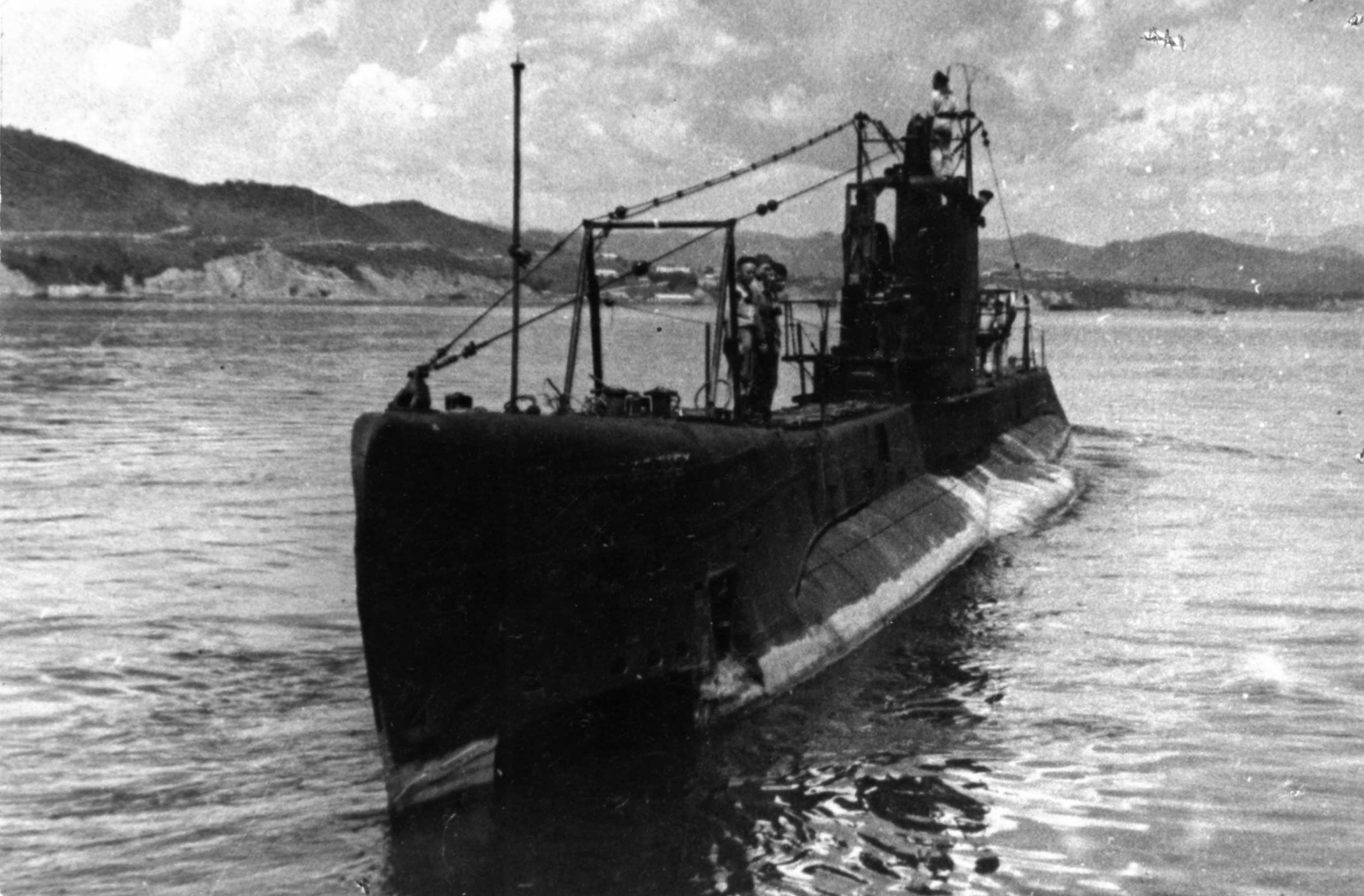
- Shch-117 at an unknown date

History

Soviet Union
- Name: Shch-117, S-117, Makerel
- Builder: plant 189 / plant 202
- Laid down: 9 October 1932
- Launched: 15 April 1934
- Commissioned: 18 December 1934
- Decommissioned: 25 April 1953
- Fate: Lost due to unknown causes on 15 December 1952

General characteristics
- Class & type: Shchuka-class submarine
- Displacement: 577 tons surfaced; 704 tons submerged
- Length: 57 m (187 ft 0 in)
- Beam: 6.2 m (20 ft 4 in)
- Draught: 3.78 m (12 ft 5 in)
- Propulsion: 2 shaft diesel electric, 1,020 kW (1,370 hp) diesel, 600 kW (800 hp) electric
- Speed: surface - 12.5 kn (23.2 km/h; 14.4 mph); submerged - 6.3 kn (11.7 km/h; 7.2 mph)
- Range: 6,000 nmi (11,000 km; 6,900 mi) at 8 kn (15 km/h; 9.2 mph)
- Test depth: 91 m (300 ft)
- Complement: 38
- Armament: 4 × bow torpedo tubes; 2 × stern torpedo tubes; (10 torpedoes); 2 × 45 mm (1.8 in) semi-automatic guns

S-117 (formerly Shch-117) was a Soviet Shchuka-class submarine (V-bis series).

The submarine's career was spent with the Soviet Pacific Fleet. It was lost on or about 15 December 1952, due to unknown causes in the Strait of Tartary in the Sea of Japan. The boat may have collided with a surface ship or struck a mine. All 47 crew died in the incident.

== Service history ==
Shch-117 was laid down on 9 October 1932 as Yard No. 189 at the Baltic Shipyard. She was delivered unassembled by rail to Dalzavod Ship Repair Center in Vladivostok for assembly and was launched on 15 April 1934 and commissioned on 18 December. Shch-117 became part of the Pacific Fleet on 28 January 1935, commanded by Nikolai Yegipko. From 11 January to 20 February 1936, Shch-117 conducted a long-endurance under-ice cruise, for which the crew received the Order of the Badge of Honour. Yegipko and Commissar Sergey Pastukhov both were awarded the Order of the Red Star in April 1936. The cruise was advertised in the Soviet press as part of the Stakhanovite movement.

On 19 April 1945, Shch-117 was transferred to a new naval base at Sovetskiy Gavan as a component of the 8th Division. After the Soviet declaration of war on Japan on 9 August, Shch-117, under the command of Captain lieutenant Pyotr Sinetsky patrolled off western Sakhalin. It did not meet Japanese opposition and was recalled to base on 20 August.

On 10 June 1949 the submarine was renamed S-117.

S-117 was lost on 15 December 1952 due to unknown circumstances. Its crew of 47 perished.
