= Saint Petersburg Naval Institute =

Russian officer training school

Peter the Great Naval Corps - Saint Petersburg Naval Institute
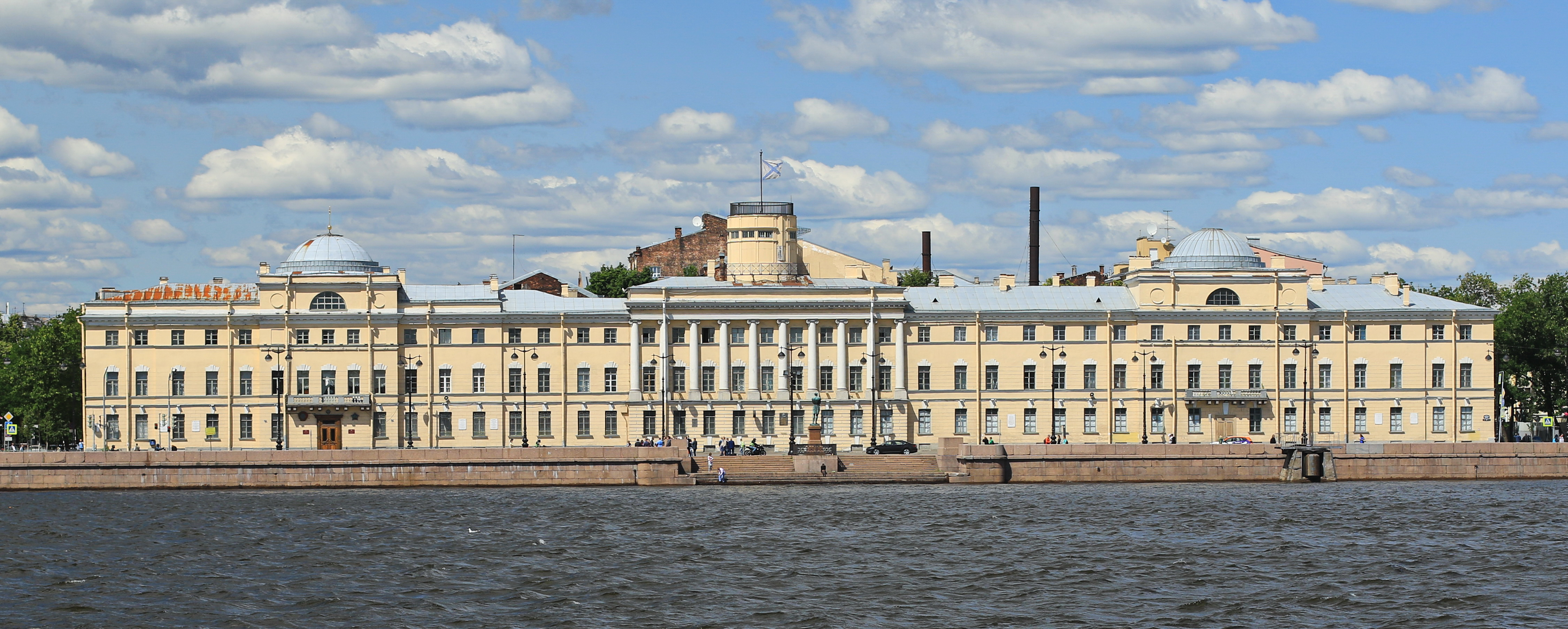
- Type: Military academy
- Established: 1701
- Principal: Rear-Admiral Oleg Ignasyuk
- Students: 378 (2010)
- Location: 17 Lieutenant Schmidt Embankment, Saint Petersburg, Russia; 59°56′06″N 30°16′45″E

The Peter the Great Naval Corps - Saint Petersburg Naval Institute (Russian: Морской корпус Петра Великого — Санкт-Петербургский военно-морской институт, romanized: Morskoy korpus Petra Velikogo – Sankt-Peterburgskiy voyenno-morskoy institut), formerly known as the M. V. Frunze Higher Naval School (named after Mikhail Frunze, in Russian: Военно-морское училище имени М. В. Фрунзе, romanized: Voyenno-morskoye uchilishche imeni M. V. Frunze), is the oldest of the Russian Navy's naval officer commissioning schools. It is located in Saint Petersburg.

== History ==
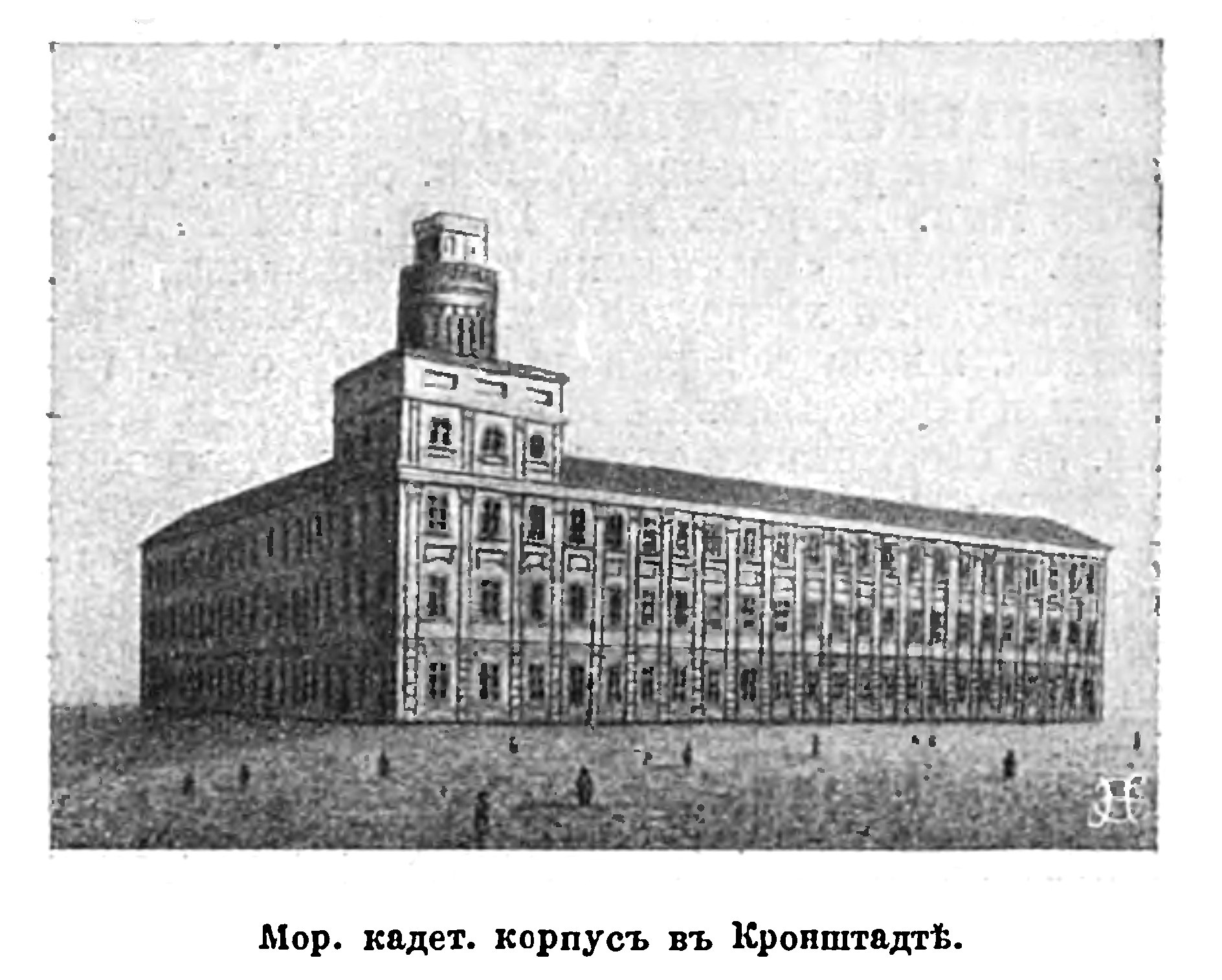
The institute's building during its time in Kronstadt (1771–1796)

The school traces its origins to the School of Mathematics and Navigation Sciences, founded in 1701 by Peter the Great, in Moscow's Sukharev Tower. After the city of Saint Petersburg was built, the school was relocated there. The school was later reorganized as the Naval Cadet Corps. After the Russian Revolution of 1917, the school closed in March 1918. On 15 September 1918, a special order established courses for the navy command staff, which opened on 10 October in the former Naval School building. The courses educated officers for the new Red Navy. In 1926 the school was named the M.V. Frunze Higher Naval School. The school was merged with the Higher Naval School of Submarine Navigation in 1998, and renamed the Saint Petersburg Naval Institute. In 2001, it received the name Peter the Great Naval Corps - Saint Petersburg Naval Institute, marking the 300th anniversary of naval education in Russia.

Other Russian Navy officer commissioning schools include the Ushakov Baltic Higher Naval School in Kaliningrad; the Naval Polytechnic Institute in Pushkin (Saint Petersburg area); Pacific Higher Naval School in Vladivostok, and the Nakhimov Black Sea Higher Naval School in Sevastopol.

== Historical Name Progression (in translation) ==
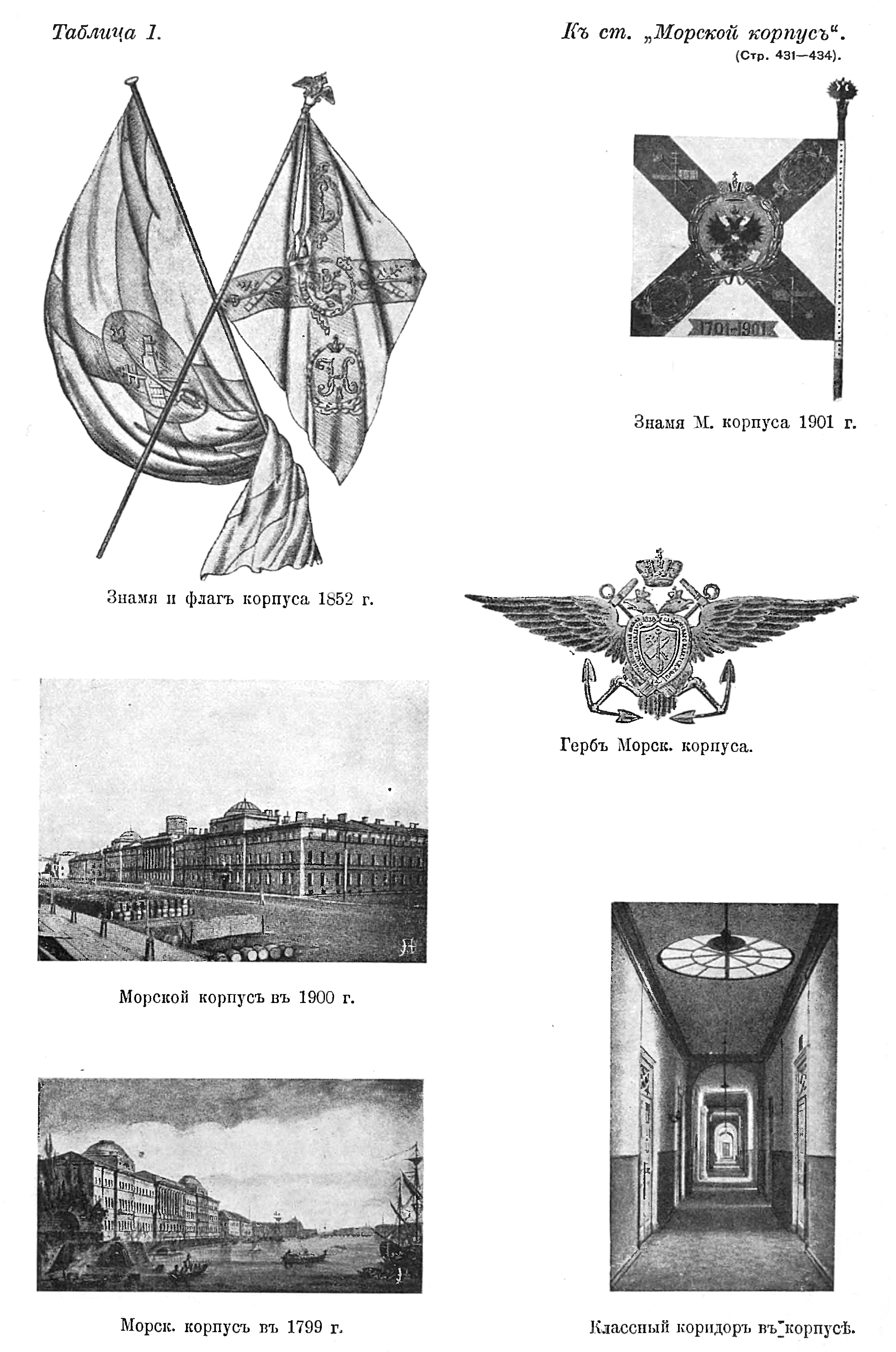
Saint Petersburg Naval Institute

- 1701-1752 - School of Mathematic and Navigation Sciences, Moscow
- 1715-1752 - Naval Guards Academy, Saint Petersburg
- 1752-1802 - Naval Gentry Cadet Corps, Saint Petersburg (1771-1796 - Kronstadt)
- 1802-1867 - Naval Cadet Corps, Saint Petersburg
- 1867-1891 - Naval School, Saint Petersburg
- 1891-1906 - Naval Cadet Corps, Saint Petersburg
- 1906-1916 - Naval Corps, Petrograd
- 1916-1918 - Naval School, Petrograd
- 1918-1919 - Fleet Command Courses, Petrograd
- 1919-1922 - Fleet Command School, Petrograd
- 1922-1926 - Naval School, Petrograd, Leningrad
- 1926-1936 - M.V. Frunze Naval School, Leningrad
- 1936-1939 - M.V. Frunze Red Banner Naval School, Leningrad
- 1939-1951 - M.V. Frunze Orders of Lenin and Red Banner Higher Naval School, Leningrad, Astrakhan, Baku, Leningrad
- 1951-1962 - M.V. Frunze Red Banner Orders of Lenin, Red Banner, and Ushakov Higher Naval School, Leningrad
- 1962-2002 - M.V. Frunze Orders of Lenin, Red Banner, and Ushakov Higher Naval School, Leningrad, Saint Petersburg
- 2002–present - Peter the Great Naval Corps - Orders of Lenin, Red Banner, and Ushakov Saint Petersburg Naval Institute, Saint Petersburg

== Distinguished graduates ==
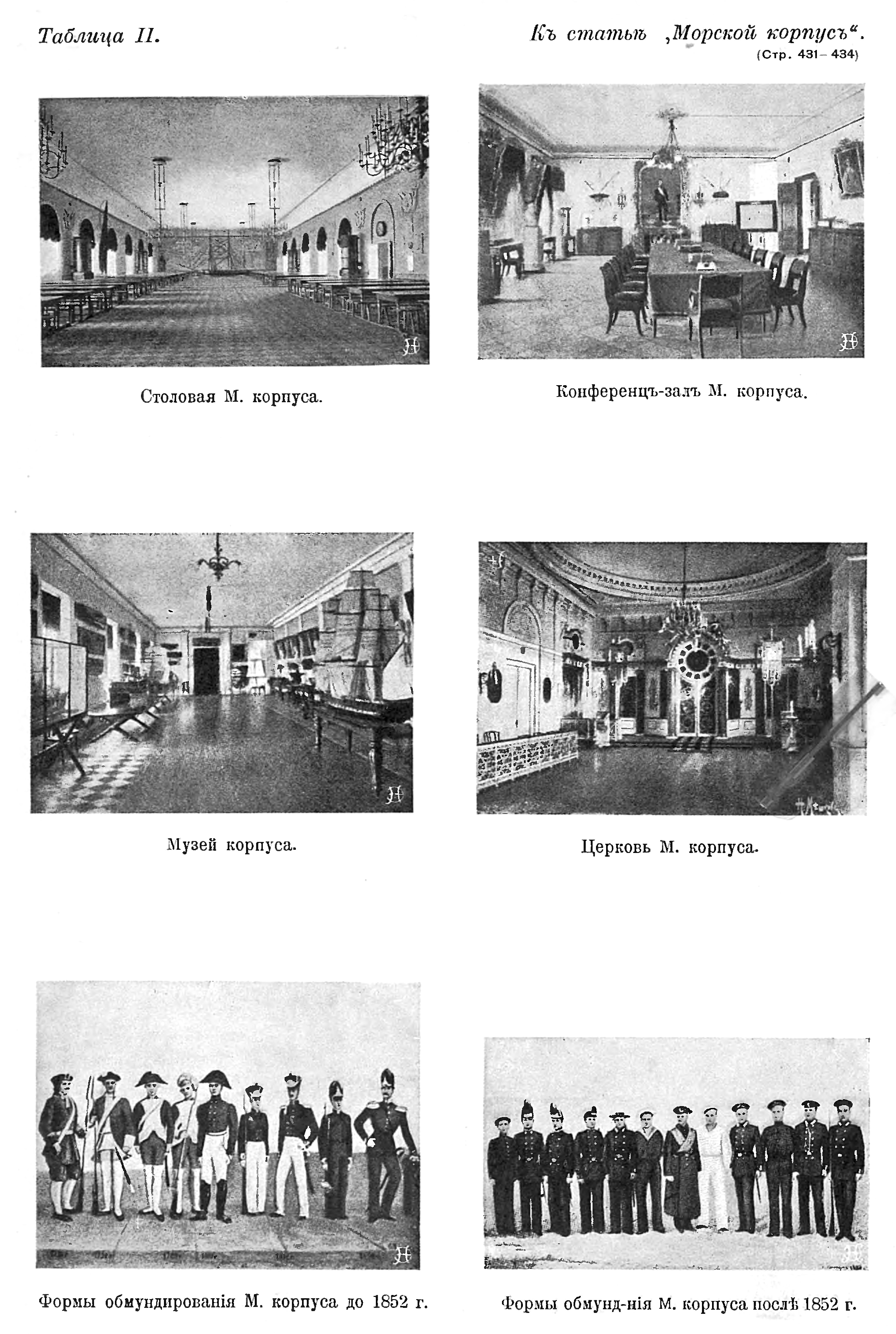
Saint Petersburg Naval Institute

- 1745 - Chichagov, Vasiliy Yakovlevich
- 1766 - Ushakov, Fedor Fedorovich
- 1780 - Senyavin, Dmitriy Nikolayevich
- 1788 - Lisyansky, Yuriy Fedorovich
- 1793 - Golovnin, Vasiliy Mikhailovich
- 1797 - Bellingsgausen, Fadey Fadeyevich
- 1818 - Nakhimov, Petr Stepanovich
- 1818 - Vrangel, Ferdinand Petrovich
- 1823 - Kornilov, Vladimir Alekseyevich
- 1832 - Gennady Ivanovich Nevelskoy
- 1894 - Kolchak, Aleksandr Vasilyevich
- 1926 - Kuznetsov, Nikolay Gerasimovich
- 1931 - Gadzhiev, Magomet Imadutinovich
- 1931 - Gorshkov, Sergey Georgiyevich
- 1931 - Kasatonov, Vladimir Afanasyevich
- 1956 - Chernavin, Vladimir Nikolayevich
