= Leonty Magnitsky =

Russian mathematician and educator

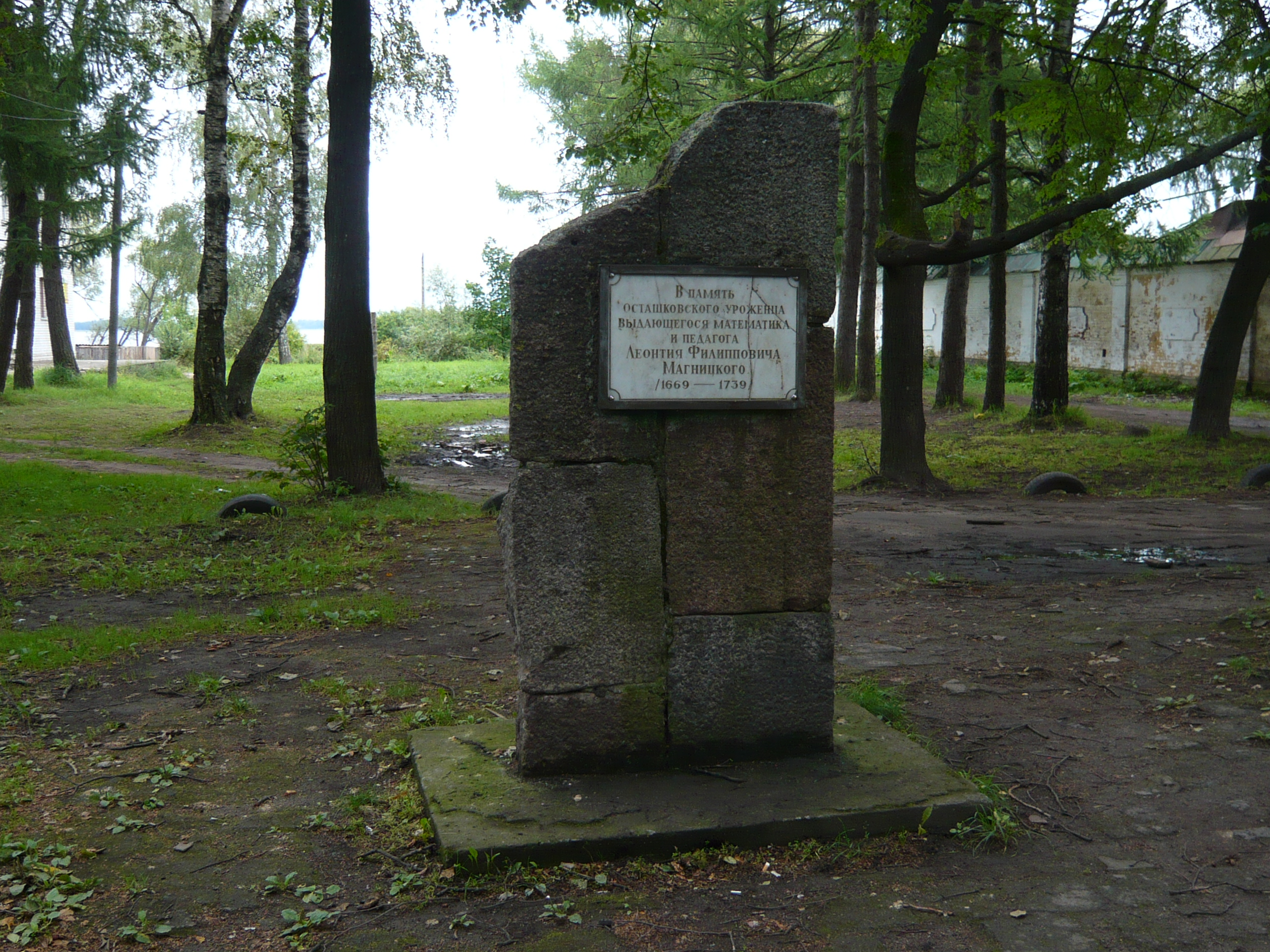
Monument in honor of Magnitsky in Ostashkov

Leonty Filippovich Magnitsky (Russian: Леонтий Филиппович Магницкий), born Telyatin (Russian: Телятин; June 9, 1669, in Ostashkov – October 19, 1739, in Moscow) was a Russian mathematician and educator.

== Biography ==
Magnitsky was born into a peasant family. According to some accounts, he graduated from the Slavic Greek Latin Academy in Moscow. From 1701 and until his death, he taught arithmetic, geometry and trigonometry at the Moscow School of Mathematics and Navigation, becoming its director in 1716.

In 1703, Magnitsky wrote his famous Arithmetic (Арифметика; 2,400 copies), which was used as the principal textbook on mathematics in Russia until the middle of the 18th century. Mikhail Lomonosov was himself taught by this book, which he called the "gates to his own erudition". In 1703, Magnitsky also produced a Russian edition of Adriaan Vlacq's log tables called Таблицы логарифмов и синусов, тангенсов и секансов (Tables of logarithms, sines, tangents, and secants).

Legend has it that Leonty Magnitsky was nicknamed Magnitsky by Peter the Great, who considered him a "people's magnet" (магнит, or "magnit" in Russian). For his educatorial achievements he was ennobled in 1704, and was given numerous awards and gifts by the Tsar.
