= Sukharev Tower =

Former landmark in Moscow, Russia

Coordinates: 55°46′22″N 37°37′56″E

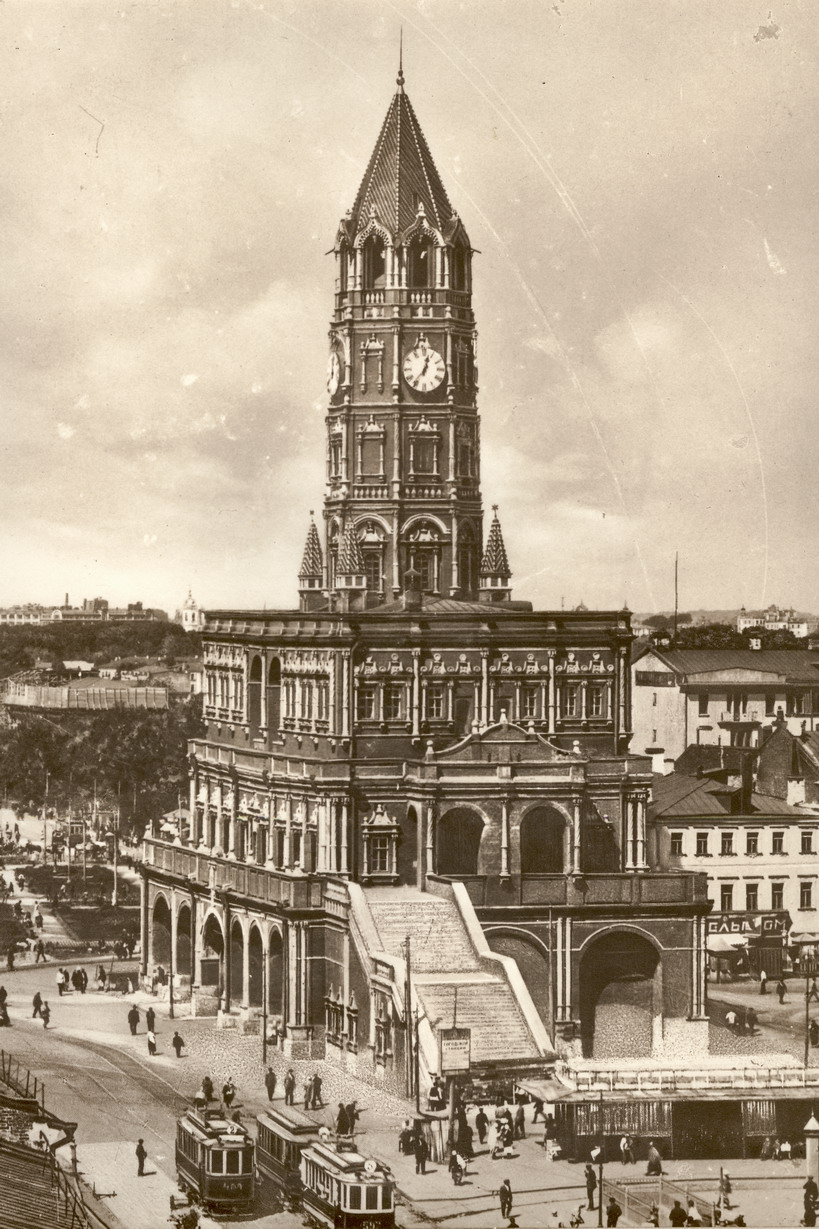
- Interactive map of the Sukharev Tower area

General information
- Architectural style: Naryshkin Baroque
- Location: Moscow, Russia
- Construction started: 1692
- Completed: 1701
- Demolished: 1934

Design and construction
- Architect: Mikhail Ivanovich Choglokov

The Sukharev Tower (Сухарева башня) was a Moscow landmark until its destruction by Soviet authorities in 1934. Tsar Peter I of Russia had the tower built in the Moscow baroque style at the intersection of the Garden Ring with Sretenka Street in 1692–1695.

== History ==
Peter ordered the construction of the tower to commemorate his triumph over his half-sister Sofia in 1689, after the Streltsy uprising had been crushed. The tower received its name in honor of Lavrentii Pankrat'evich Sukharev, whose regiment of streltsy had supported Peter.

=== Tower construction ===
The brick tower was built from 1692 through 1701 under the direction of the architect Mikhail Ivanovich Choglokov. It was not a fortress but rather a ceremonial gateway into the city.

The first floor formed an arched entrance to the city. The second floor contained guardrooms. Originally these served as barracks for Sukharev's regiment of streltsy, but the streltsy were disbanded at the end of the 17th century. The third floor housed the Moscow School of Mathematics and Navigation. The school was part of Peter's grand plan to introduce western education to Russia. Choglokov did some remodeling in 1701. Count Yakov Bruce made the upper story his astronomical observatory, the first in Russia. The fourth floor had a clock and a state coat-of-arms. "An attractive typically Muscovite, wide exterior staircase led to a gallery on the first floor and surrounding the building."

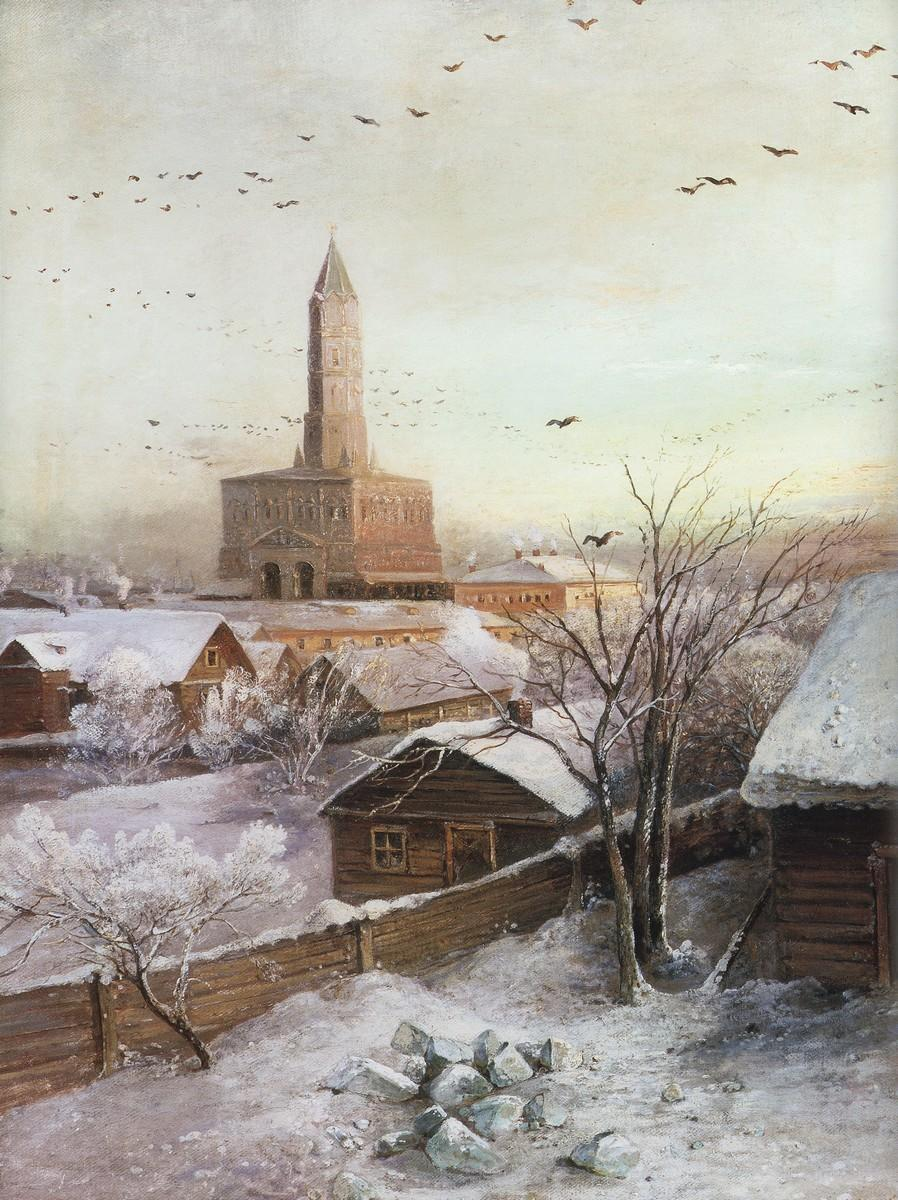
The Sukharev Tower in 1872, painting by Alexei Savrasov.

=== Tower, an integral part of city infrastructure ===
Catherine the Great (reigned 1762-1796) allowed Moscow merchants to use the tower premises for storehouses and shops.

Catherine ordered the construction of a water-supply system from the village of Mytishchi to Moscow. The Mytishchi Water Conduit, built between 1779 and 1804, ended near the Sukharev tower to dispense water. Between 1826 and 1835 engineer major-general Nikolai Ivanovich Yanish (Russian: Николай Иванович Яниш) repaired and expanded the Mytishchi Water Supply. At this time two steam-engine powered pumps and a cast-iron tank holding 5000 (buckets) gallons of water were built on the second floor of the tower to improve the water pressure. Pipes from the tower led to fountains. One of these fountains, called Sheremetev, was located in the Sukharev square near the tower.

A large market, the Sukharevka, bustled around the tower in the 19th century. In 1921 the Soviet government turned the tower into the Moscow Municipal Museum, which later became the Moscow City Museum. The Soviet government closed down the famous flea market in 1925. It is said that Lenin felt that the market was a "breeding ground for speculation".

=== Tower destruction ===
"The bride of the Ivan Velikiy" (as Muscovites used to call the tower) was demolished in 1934 by order of Lazar Kaganovich, Secretary of the Moscow City Committee. It took place during reconstruction of the city ordered by Joseph Stalin, that gave birth to Stalinist architecture. It was said that the tower blocked traffic.

=== Proposed tower replica ===
Over the years Moscow authorities several times considered building a replica of the tower, but no decision has been made.

== See also ==
- Menshikov Tower
- Naryshkin baroque
- State Historical Museum
