= Moscow School of Mathematics and Navigation =

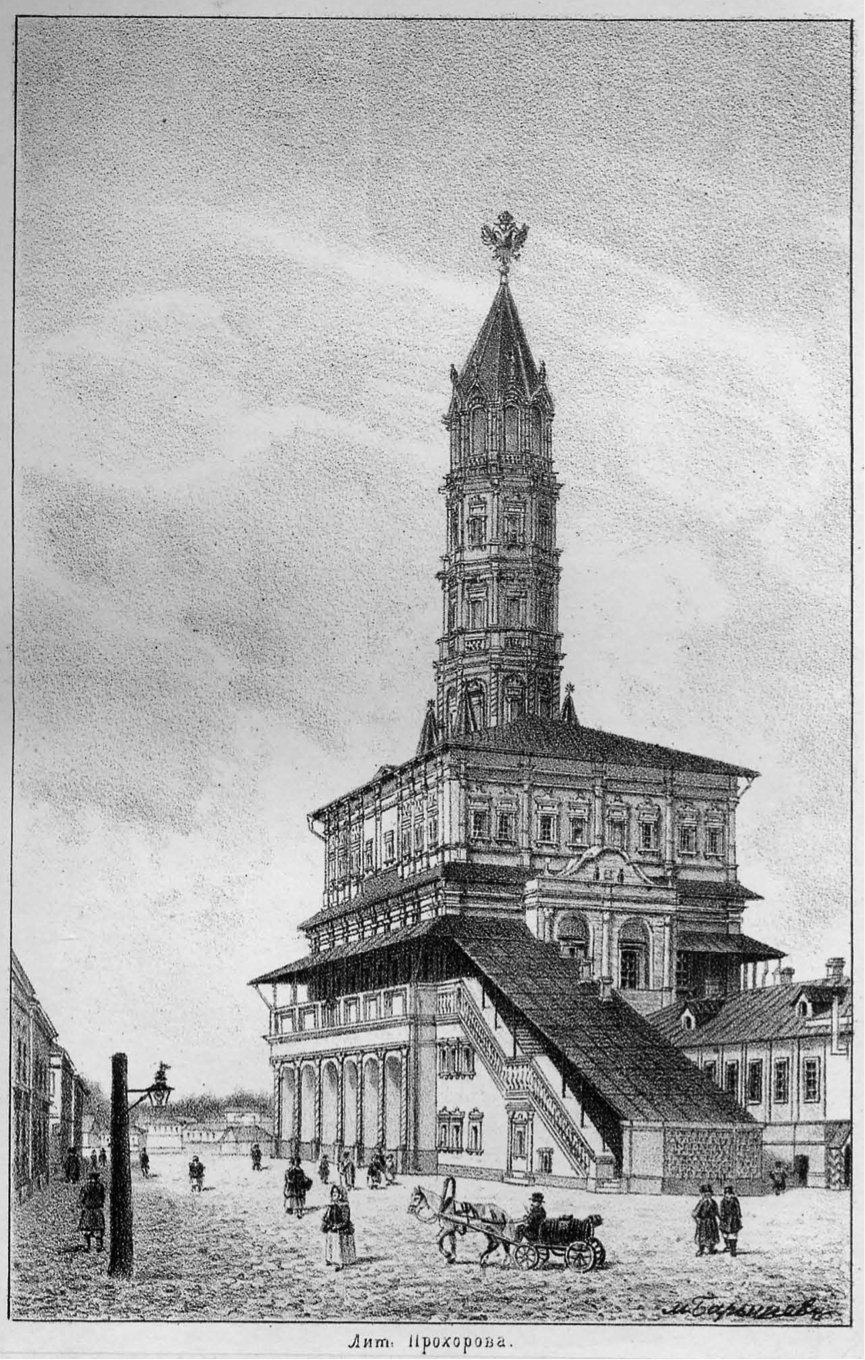
Suharev Tower, Moscow.

Moscow School of Mathematics and Navigation (Russian: Школа математических и навигацких наук) was a Russian educational institution founded by Peter the Great in 1701. Situated in the Sukharev Tower, it provided Russians with technical education for the first time and much of its curriculum was devoted to producing sailors, engineers, cartographers and bombardiers to support Peter's expanding navy and army. It is the forerunner of the modern system of technical education of Russia. In 1712, Artillery classes and Engineering classes were moved to Saint Petersburg to found the Engineering school and Artillery school. Abram Petrovich Gannibal was the first chief of engineering school. In 1715 Navigator classes were moved to Saint Petersburg to found the Marine academy. The school closed in 1752.
