= List of Russian admirals =

This list of Russian admirals includes the admirals of all ranks, serving in the Russian Imperial Navy, the Soviet Navy and the modern Russian Navy.

See also the categories Category:Imperial Russian Navy admirals and Category:Soviet admirals.

== Alphabetical list ==
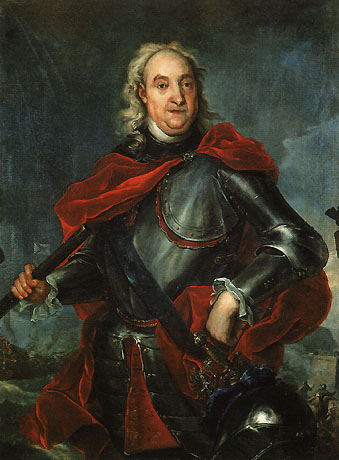
Apraksin

=== A ===
- Pavel Sergeyevich Abankin, Admiral, Head of Naval Academy (1944), Deputy Navy Minister for Shipbuilding and Armaments, Head of the Hydrographic Directorate (1952-1958)
- Abdulikhat Abassov, Rear admiral, (1929-1996), Head of Nuclear Submarine Training Center, Chief of Navy Combat Training
- Mikhail Leopoldovich Abramov, admiral, commander of the Northern Fleet (2004-2005), chief of staff and first deputy Commander-in-Chief of the Navy (2005-2009).
- Ildar Ferdinandovich Akhmerov, Vice-Admiral, Commander of the Caspian Flotilla (2014-2015), first deputy commander of the Black Sea Fleet
- Vladimir Antonovich Alafuzov, Admiral, Chief of the Main Navy Staff, Soviet Navy
- Vladimir Nikolayevich Alekseyev, Admiral, First Deputy Chief of the Main Navy Staff
- Sergei Gavrilovich Alyokminsky, Vice-Admiral, Commander of the Caspian Flotilla (2010-2014)
- Nikolay Nikolayevich Amelko, Admiral, Commander of the Pacific Fleet
- Vladimir Aleksandrovich Andreyev, admiral, commander of the 4th Fleet
- Fyodor Apraksin, General admiral, won the Battle of Gangut during the Great Northern War, led the Imperial Russian Navy in the Russo-Persian War (1722–1723)
- Sergey Iosifovich Avakyants, Admiral, Commander of the Pacific Fleet

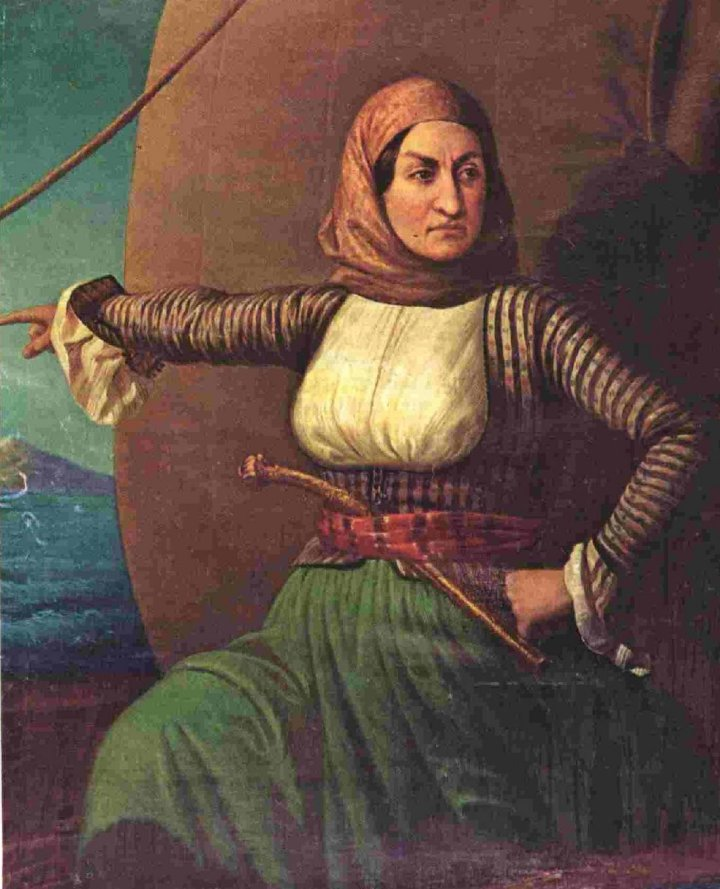
Bouboulina

=== B ===
- Nikolai Efremovich Basistiy, Admiral, Commander of the Black Sea Fleet
- Fabian Gottlieb von Bellingshausen, Admiral, notable participant of the First Russian circumnavigation, leader of another Russian circumnavigation during which he and his second-in-command Mikhail Lazarev discovered the continent of Antarctica
- Aksel Ivanovich Berg, Admiral and scientist, major developer of radiolocation and cybernetics
- Vladimir Ivanovich Bogdashin, rear admiral, captain of the frigate Bezzavetnyy during the 1988 Black Sea bumping incident
- Ivan Botsis, Admiral in charge of the galley fleet under Peter the Great
- Laskarina Bouboulina, Greek naval commander, heroine of the Greek War of Independence in 1821, and posthumously an admiral of the Imperial Russian Navy.

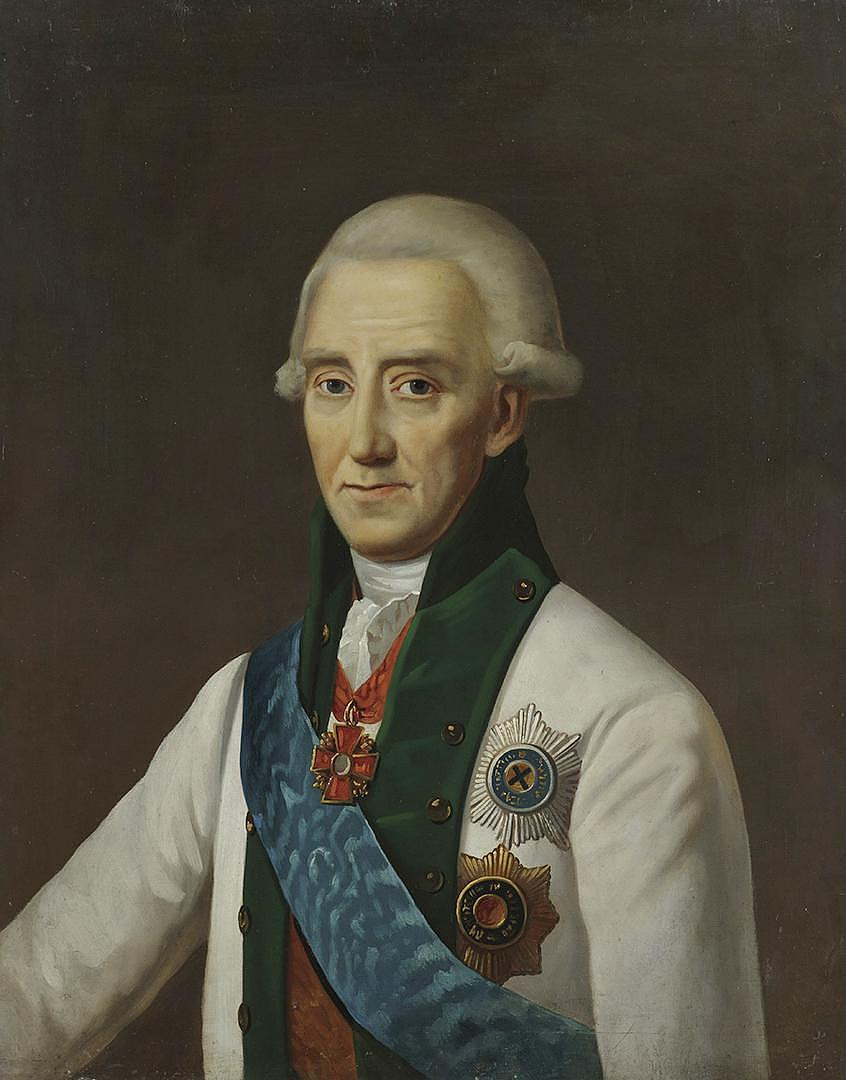
Chichagov

=== C ===
- Andrei Trofimovich Chabanenko, admiral, Commander of the Northern Fleet
- Vladimir Nikolayevich Chernavin, Fleet admiral, Commander of the Soviet Northern Fleet, the last Commander-in-Chief of the Soviet Navy, first and only Commander-in-Chief of the CIS Navy
- Pavel Chichagov, admiral, in command of an army, blamed for Napoleon's escape across the Berezina.
- Vasiliy Chichagov, Admiral, polar explorer, Pavel's father, won the battles of Öland, Reval and Vyborg Bay, effectively bringing the Russo-Swedish War of 1788-90 to an end
- Viktor Viktorovich Chirkov, Admiral, Commander of the Baltic Fleet (2009-2012), Commander-in-Chief of the Russian Navy (2012-2016)
- Grigoriy Pavlovich Chukhnin, Vice admiral, commander of the Black Sea Fleet during the 1905 Russian Revolution and battleship Potemkin mutiny until his assassination in 1906.
- Cornelius Cruys, Vice admiral, the first commander of the Russian Baltic Fleet

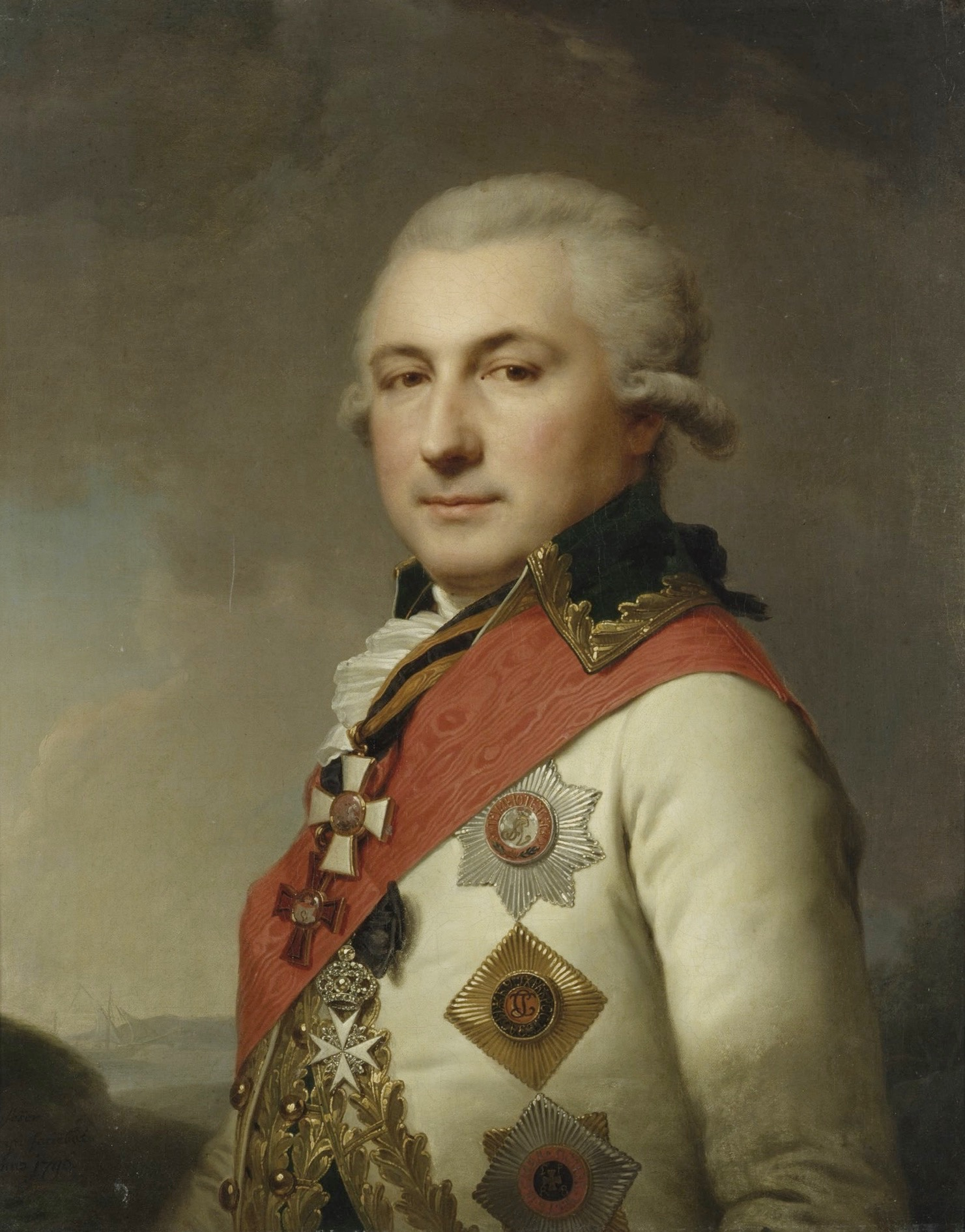
Deribas (de Ribas)

=== D ===
- Osip Mikhailovich Deribas (José de Ribas in Spanish), Vice admiral, founder of Odessa, hero of the siege of Izmail
- Fyodor Dubasov, Admiral, placed Port Arthur and Dalny under Russian control
- Valentin Drozd, Vice admiral, commander of Baltic Fleet Squadron 1941–1943 and Northern Fleet 1938–1940
- Nikolai Dimitrievich Dabić. Vice admiral, died in 1908 from wounds sustained in the Russo-Japanese War

=== E ===
- Oskar Enqvist, Vice Admiral, Commander of the First Cruiser Division of the 2nd Pacific Squadron during the Russo-Japanese War
- Arvid Adolf Etholén, Vice Admiral, explorer, Chief Manager of the Russian American Company 1840-1845.

=== F ===
- Aleksandr Fedotenkov, Vice admiral, Commander of the Black Sea Fleet, deputy commander of the Navy
- Baron Dmitry Gustavovich von Fölkersahm, Rear Admiral, Commander of the 2nd battle division of the 2nd Pacific Squadron. Died of cancer onboard battleship Oslyabya a few days before Battle of Tsushima
- Viktor Dmitryevich Fyodorov, admiral, commander of the Pacific Fleet (2001-2007)

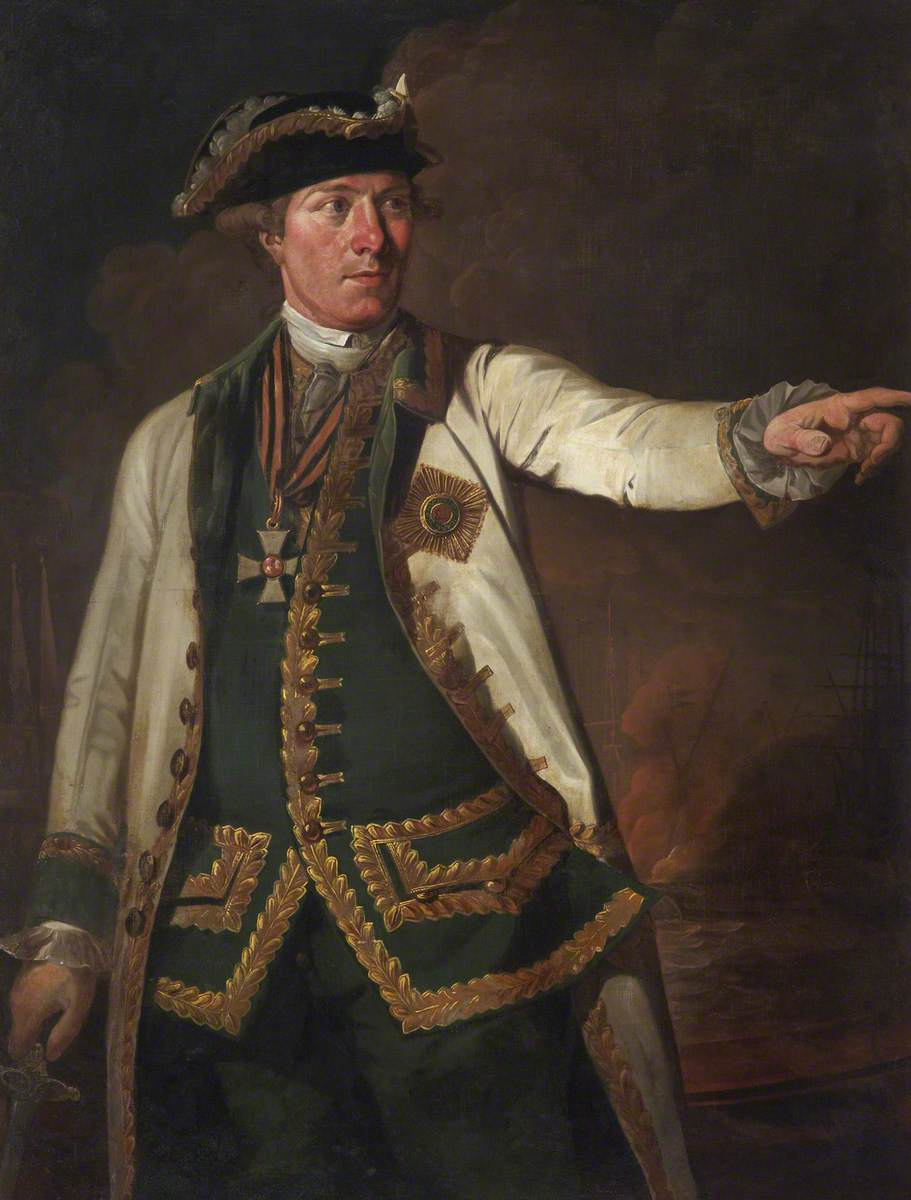
Greig

=== G ===
- Lev Mikhailovich Galler, Admiral, Chief of the Main Navy Staff
- Mikhail Mikhailovich Golitsyn, General Admiral from 1756 to 1762
- Arseniy Grigoryevich Golovko, Admiral, Commander of the Northern Fleet
- Sergey Georgiyevich Gorshkov, Fleet admiral of the Soviet Union (one of only three), led a number of landing operations in the Black Sea during World War II, the Commander-in-Chief of the Soviet Navy during most of the Cold War and for almost 30 years (1956-1985)
- Samuel Greig, Admiral, won the Battle of Chesma during the Russo-Turkish War (1768-1774) and participated in the Battle of Hogland during the Russo-Swedish War (1788–1790)
- Ivan Ivanovich Gren, vice-admiral, speciality in gunnery, director of naval artillery during the siege of Leningrad
- Ivan Konstantinovich Grigorovich, Admiral, chief of Port Arthur's port during the siege of Port Arthur, Russia's last Naval Minister
- Vladimir Vladimirovich Grishechkin, Rear Admiral, Chief of Staff/1st Deputy Commander of Northern Fleet
- Feliks Nikolayevich Gromov, Fleet admiral, Commander-in-Chief of the Russian Navy, previously commander of the Northern Fleet
- Thomas Gordon, (1658–1741) Admiral, Governor and Commander-in-Chief at Kronshtadt from 1727 until his death in 1741. His granddaughter Anne Young married a Scot, Lt. Thomas MacKenzie (Foma Kalinovich Mekenzi, Фома Калинович Мекензи – Son of Colin). Two years after their marriage in 1738 they had a son also called Thomas (Foma Fomich Mekenzi (Фома Фомич Мекензи - Son of Thomas)), a Scottish-Russian rear admiral who founded the city of Sevastopol in service of the Russian Empire in 1783.

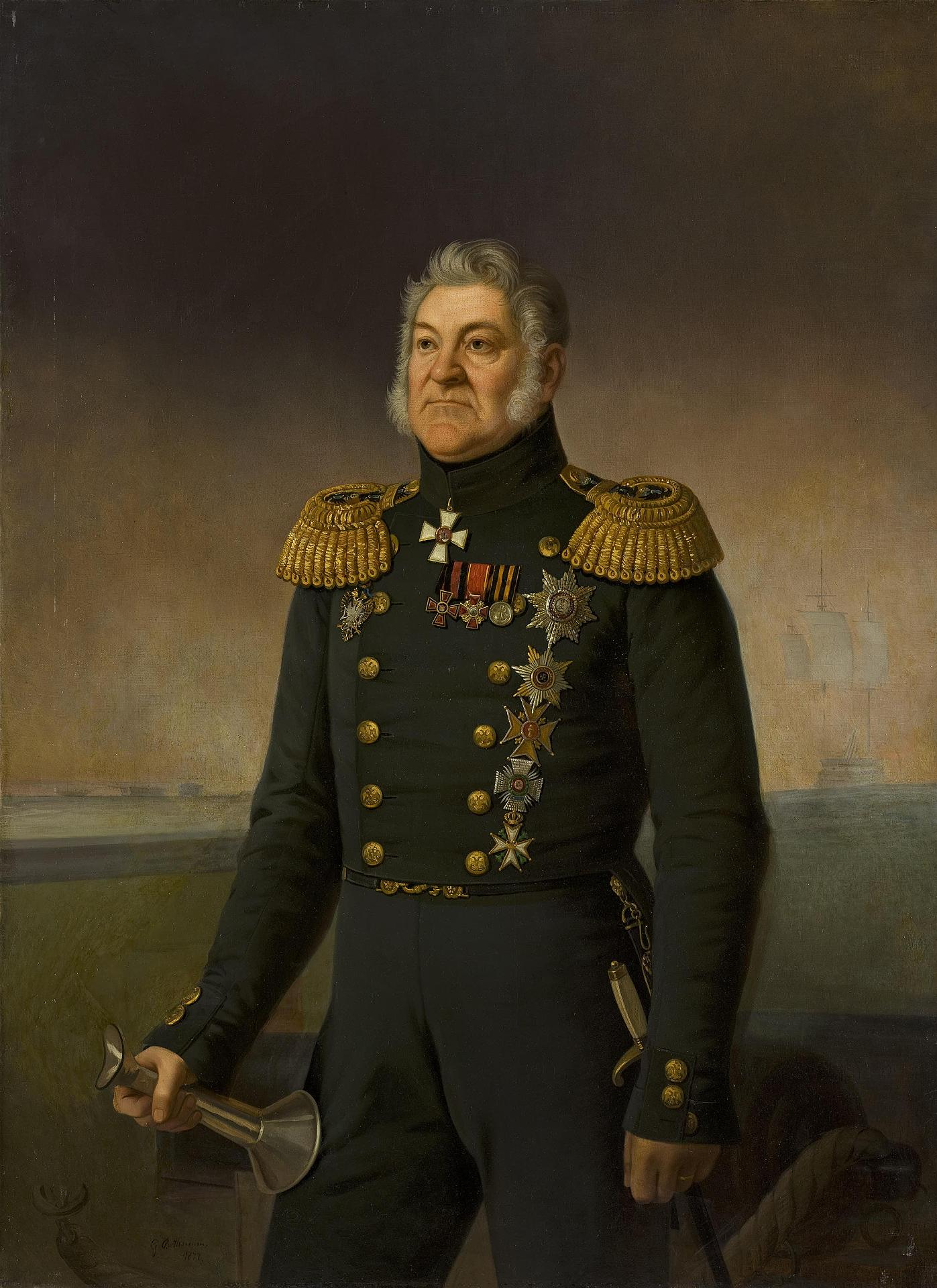
Heiden

=== H ===
- Loggin Heiden, Dutchman, Russian admiral, winner of the Battle of Navarino.

=== I ===
- Ivan Stepanovich Isakov, Fleet admiral of the Soviet Union (one of only three), served during World War II, Chief of the Main Navy Staff, oceanographer
- Vladimir Ivanovich Istomin, Rear admiral, fought in the Battle of Navarino, hero of the siege of Sevastopol (1854–1855) during the Crimean War, died in action
- Vitaly Pavlovich Ivanov, admiral, commander of the Baltic Fleet (1985–1991), head of the Kuznetsov Naval Academy (1991–1995)

=== J ===
- John Paul Jones, Rear admiral, served in and achieved rank of Rear Admiral with the Black Sea Fleet after serving as a Captain in the American Navy during the American Revolution, fought at Ochakov

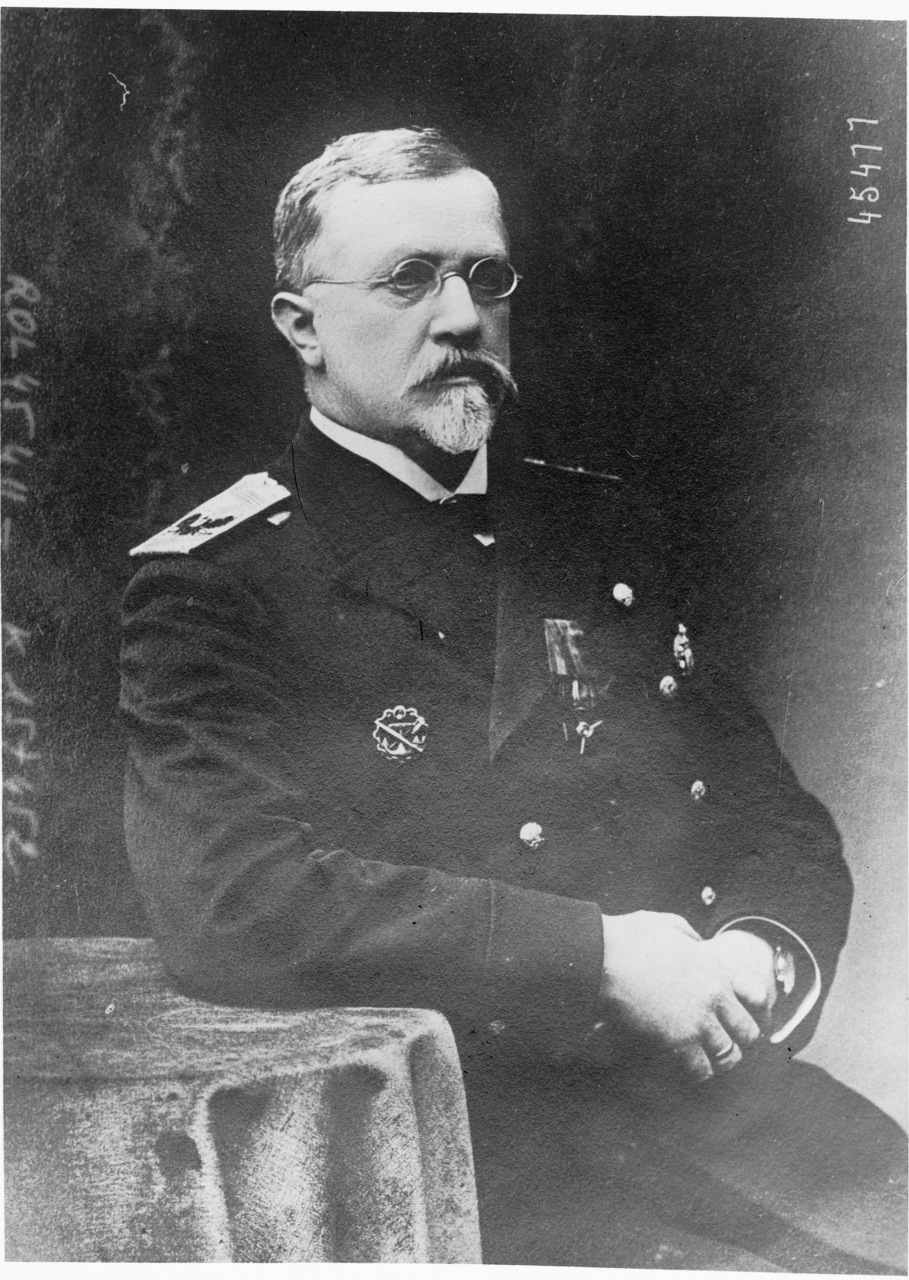
Kanin

=== K ===
- Konstantin Petrovich Kabantsov, Vice-Admiral, commander of the Northern Fleet
- Vasily Kanin, Admiral, winner of the Battle of the Gulf of Riga
- Igor Vladimirovich Kasatonov, Admiral, Deputy Commander-in-Chief of the Russian Navy
- Vladimir Afanasyevich Kasatonov, Fleet Admiral, First Deputy Commander-in-Chief of the Soviet Navy
- Vladimir Lvovich Kasatonov, Vice-Admiral, head of the N. G. Kuznetsov Naval Academy
- Mikhail Alexandrovich Kedrov, Vice admiral, who led White Russian forces, including the evacuation of Wrangel's fleet from the Crimea as the Russian Civil War came to a close
- Yuri Mikhailovich Khaliullin, Rear Admiral, engineer and academic, head of the Lenin Higher Naval Engineering School and the Naval Engineering Institute
- Mikhail Nikolayevich Khronopulo, Admiral, commander of the Black Sea Fleet between 1985 and 1991
- Aleksandr Vasilyevich Kolchak, Admiral, polar explorer, commander of the Black Sea Fleet, a leader of the White movement during the Russian Civil War
- Nikolay Kolomeytsev, Vice admiral, polar explorer, a hero of the Russo-Japanese War, later led White Russian naval forces in the Baltic during the Russian Civil War
- Vladimir Konovalov, Rear admiral, distinguished submarine commander during World War II
- Vladimir Alekseyevich Kornilov, Vice admiral, fought in the Battle of Navarino, hero of the siege of Sevastopol (1854–1855), died in the Battle of Malakoff
- Vladimir Ivanovich Korolev, Admiral, Commander-in-Chief Russian Navy, Commander of Northern Fleet
- Anatoly Mikhailovich Kosov, vice-admiral, Commander of the Baltic Fleet
- Nikolay Krabbe, Admiral and Naval Minister, co-founded the first Russian naval bases in Primorsky Krai, oversaw the development of naval artillery and ironclad ships
- Viktor Petrovich Kravchuk, vice-admiral, commander of the Caspian Flotilla (2005-2009), commander of the Baltic Fleet (2012-2016)
- Nikolai Mikhailovich Kulakov, Vice admiral, political branch, Hero of the Soviet Union
- Vladimir Ivanovich Kuroyedov, Fleet admiral, Commander-in-Chief of the Russian Navy
- Konstantin Matveyevich Kuznetsov, rear-admiral, head of the M. V. Frunze Higher Naval School and the Higher Naval School of Submarine Navigation
- Nikolay Gerasimovich Kuznetsov, (1902-1974), Fleet admiral of the Soviet Union (one of only three), the Commander-in-Chief of the Soviet Navy during World War II (1939-1946)
- Adam Johann von Krusenstern (1770–1846), Admiral, led the first Russian circumnavigation with Yuri Lisyansky
- Alexander Ivanovich Kruz (1731-1799), Fleet Admiral

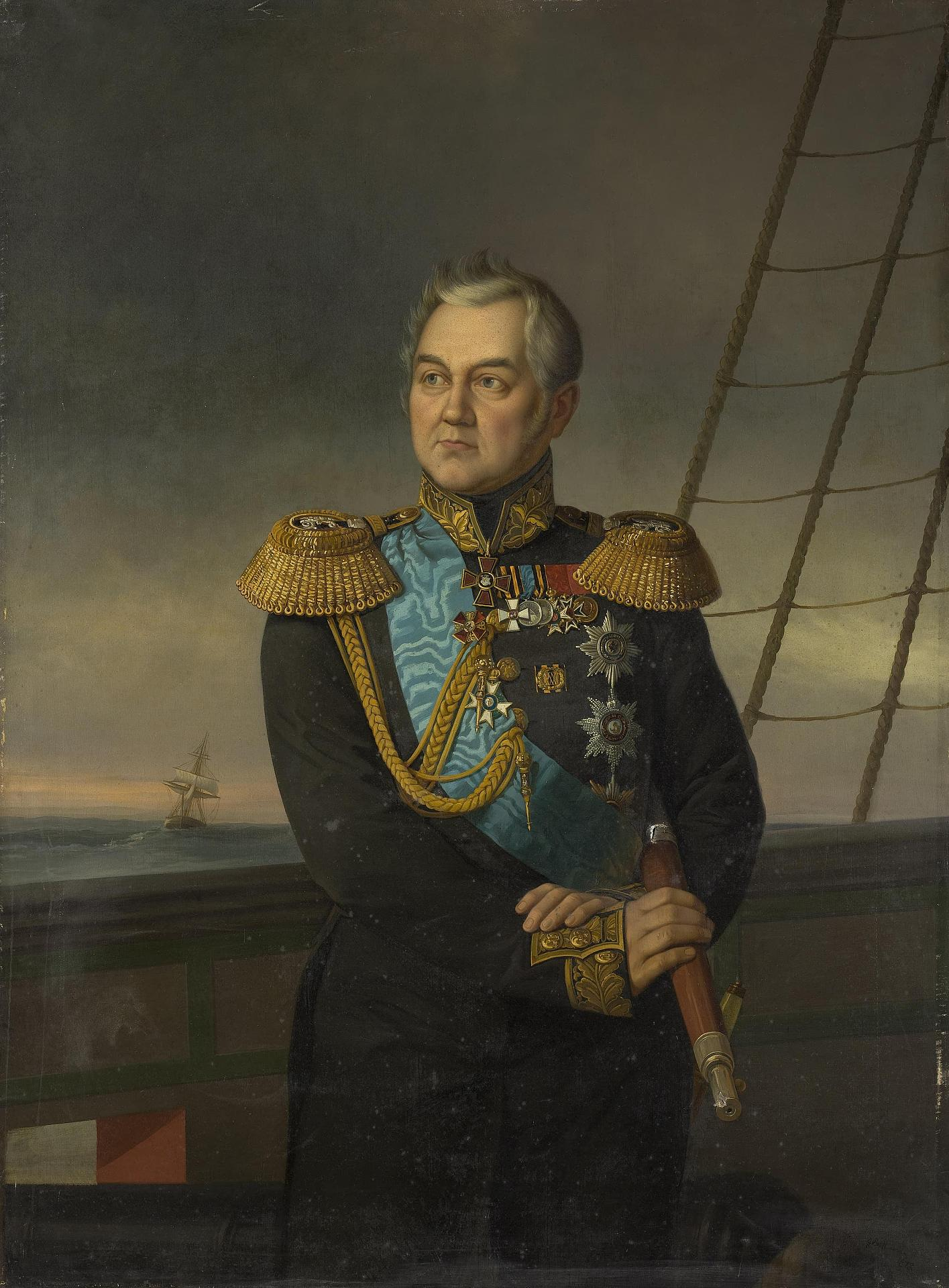
Lazarev

=== L ===
- Mikhail Petrovich Lazarev, Admiral, three times circumnavigator and discoverer of Antarctica, destroyed five enemy warships as a commander of Azov in the Battle of Navarino, tutor of Nakhimov, Kornilov and Istomin
- Viktor Nikolayevich Liina, Vice Admiral, Chief of Staff/1st Deputy Commander of Black Sea Fleet
- Sergey Vladimrovich Lipilin, Vice Admiral, Commander Baltic Fleet
- Semyon Mikhailovich Lobov, Fleet admiral, Commander of the Northern Fleet

=== M ===
- Thomas Mackenzie (Foma Kalinovich Mekenzi, Фома Калинович Мекензи, Russian admiral, 1710–1766), Rear admiral, entered Russian Navy in 1736 at Archangel. Father of Rear Admiral Thomas MacKenzie (the founder of Sebastopol)
- Thomas Mackenzie (1740–1786), Rear admiral, Founder of Sevastopol 1783, first Commander-in-Chief of the Black Sea Fleet. Awarded Knight Order of St. George IV Class for his bravery in successfully navigating a fireship into the enemy which contributed to the destruction of the Turkish Fleet in the Russian/Turkish War at Chesma 5–7 July 1770
- Konstantin Valentinovich Makarov, (1931-2011), Fleet Admiral, Chief of the Main Navy Staff/First Deputy Commander-in-Chief of the Navy
- Stepan Osipovich Makarov, Vice admiral, inventor and explorer, performed the first ever successful torpedo attack (during the Russo-Turkish War of 1877–1878), built the first torpedo boat tender and the first polar icebreaker, author of the insubmersibility theory, killed in the Russo-Japanese War when his ship struck a naval mine
- Nikolai Mikhailovich Maksimov, Admiral, Commander of the Northern Fleet, head of the Naval Academy
- Pavel Petrovich Maksutov, Rear admiral, hero of the Battle of Sinop and the siege of Sevastopol (1854–1855)
- Viktor Nikolayevich Mardusin, Vice Admiral, Commander of the Baltic Fleet
- Nikolai Ilych Martynyuk (1934-2021), Vice Admiral, First Deputy Chief of Staff of the Pacific Fleet
- Vladimir Petrovich Maslov, (1925-1989), Admiral, Commander of the Pacific Fleet (1974-1979)
- Vladimir Solveyevich Maslyuk, rear admiral
- Vladimir Vasilyevich Masorin, Fleet admiral, Commander-in-Chief of the Russian Navy
- Aleksandr Danilovich Menshikov, (1673-1729), Admiral, close associate of Peter I (the Great) active in early Russian naval battles
- Vladimir Vasilyevich Mikhailin, Admiral, Commander of the Baltic Fleet
- Arkadiy Petrovich Mikhailovskiy, Admiral, Commander of Northern Fleet (1981-1984)
- Aleksandr Alekseyevich Moiseyev, Vice admiral, commander of the Black Sea Fleet
- Mikhail Vasilyevich Motsak, Vice admiral, Chief of Staff/1st Deputy Commander of the Northern Fleet
- Igor Timurbulatovich Mukhametshin, Vice Admiral, Chief of Staff/1st Deputy Commander of Baltic Fleet

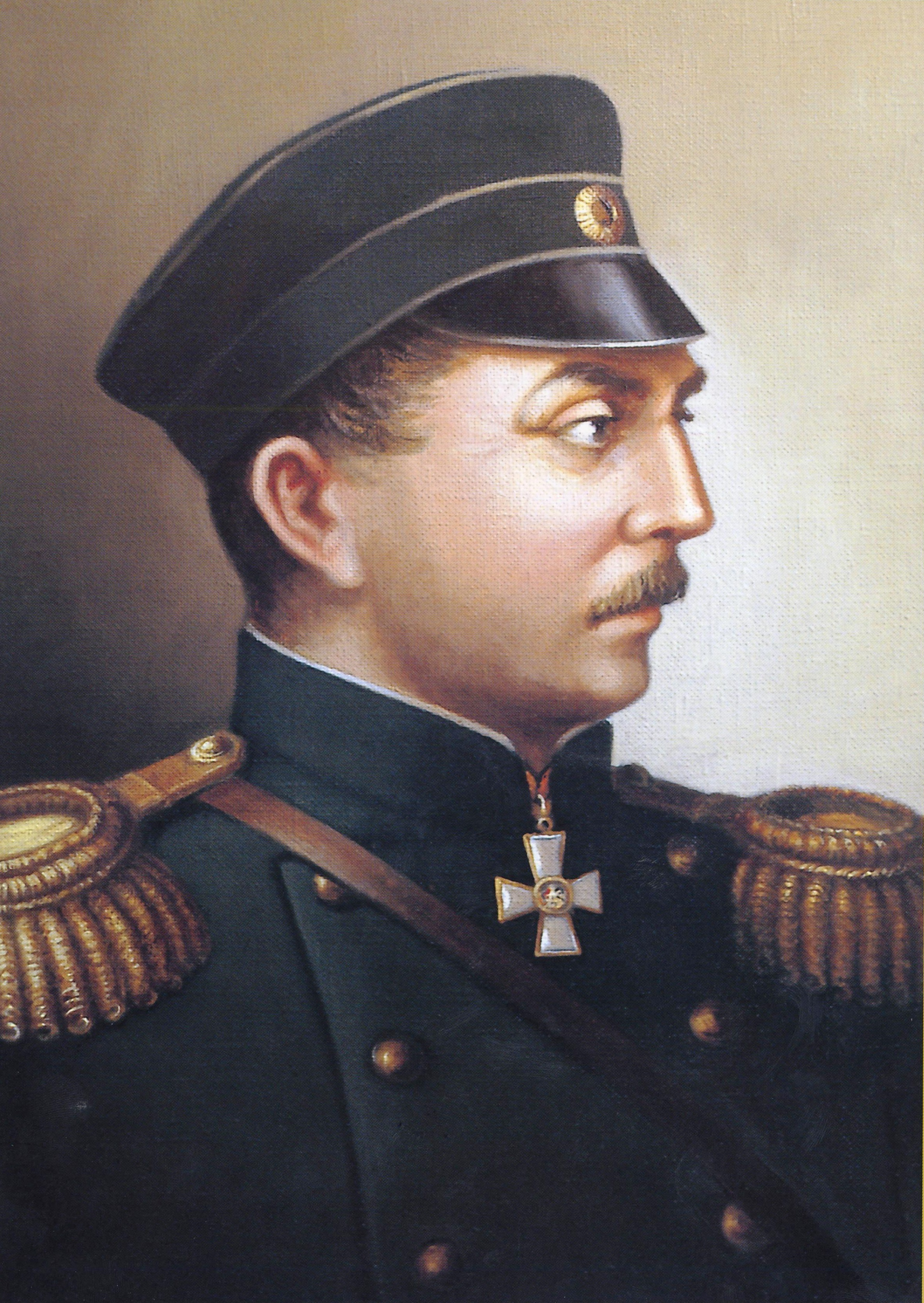
Nakhimov

=== N ===
- Pavel Stepanovich Nakhimov, Admiral, circumnavigated the world with Mikhail Lazarev, fought in the Battle of Navarino, annihilated the Ottoman fleet in the Battle of Sinope, commander and hero at the siege of Sevastopol (1854–1855)
- Charles Henry of Nassau-Siegen, Admiral, won several battles during the Russo-Turkish War (1787–1792) and was defeated in the Battle of Svensksund in the Russo-Swedish War (1788–1790)
- Pyotr Nikolayevich Navoytsev, (1920-1993), Admiral, First Deputy Chief of the Main Navy Staff (1975-1988)
- Gennady Ivanovich Nevelskoy, (1813-1876), Admiral, prominent explorer of the Far East
- Aleksandr Andreyevich Nikolayev, (1905-1949), Vice-Admiral, Deputy Chief of the Armed Forces' Main Political Directorate
- Aleksandr Mikhailovich Nosatov, Admiral, Commander Baltic Fleet
- Pavel Ivanovich Novitsky Vice Admiral, commander of the pre-dreadnought battleship Dvenadsat Apostolov, Chief Commander of Sevastopol Port 1916. Executed by Bolsheviks 1917.

=== O ===
- Aleksey Grigoryevich Orlov, Commander of the Russian fleet during the Russo-Turkish War of 1768–1774, victor of the Battle of Chesma
- Filipp Sergeyevich Oktyabrskiy (Ivanov), Admiral, Commander of the Black Sea Fleet, a leader of defence in the siege of Sevastopol (1941–1942)
- Aleksandr Yevstafyevich Oryol, Admiral, Commander of the Baltic Fleet
- Igor Vladimirovich Osipov, Admiral, Commander of the Black Sea Fleet

=== P ===
- Yuriy Aleksandrovich Panteleyev, Admiral, Commander of the Pacific Fleet
- Pavel Pereleshin, Rear admiral, hero of the Battle of Sinop and the siege of Sevastopol (1854–1855)
- Aleksandr Igorevich Peshkov, rear admiral, Commander of Caspian Flotilla
- Igor Nikolayevich Petrov, rear admiral, political branch
- Sergey Mikhailovich Pinchuk, Vice Admiral, Commander of Caspian Flotilla
- Vasiliy Ivanovich Platonov, Admiral, Commander of the Northern Fleet
- Valentin Nikolayevich Ponikarovsky, admiral, deputy commander in chief of the Black Sea Fleet, the Northern Fleet, head of the Naval Academy
- Andrey Popov, Admiral, hero of the Crimean War, led a Russian flotilla to support the Union during the American Civil War, designed the first true Russian battleship Pyotr Velikiy

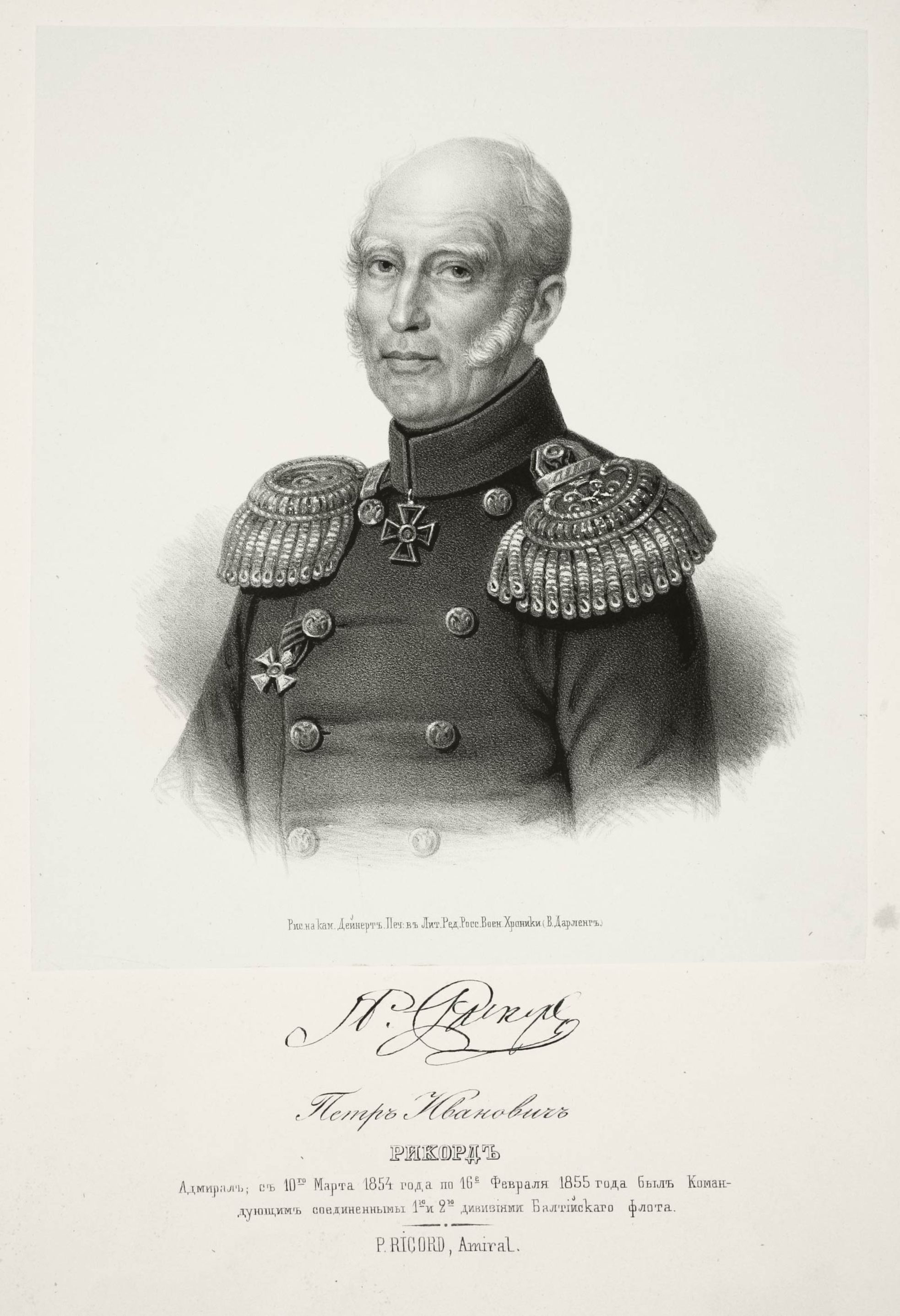
Ricord

=== R ===
- Yuri Fedorovich Rall, Vice admiral, Second World War, Soviet evacuation of Tallinn, siege of Leningrad
- Anatoliy Ivanovich Rassokho, Admiral, Head of Defense Ministry Main Directorate of Navigation and Oceanography
- Mikhail Reyneke, Vice admiral, major 19th century hydrographer
- Pyotr Ivanovich Ricord, Admiral, Head of the Russian Navy squadrons blockaded the Dardanelles during the Russo-Turkish War (1828-1829), participated in the Civil conflict in Greece (1831–1833), and defended Kronstadt (1854) during the Crimean War (1853–1856)
- Adam Adamovich Rimashevsky, vice-admiral, head of the Ushakov Baltic Higher Naval School, the Higher Special Officer Classes of the Navy, and the Kuznetsov Naval Academy
- Grand Duke Alexey Alexandrovich (Romanov), General admiral and Naval Minister during the Russo-Japanese War
- Grand Duke Konstantin Nikolayevich (Romanov), General admiral and statesman, oversaw the rapid transition of the Russian Navy to ironclad warships
- Zinoviy Petrovich Rozhestvenskiy, Vice Admiral, commander of the 2nd Pacific Squadron during the Russo-Japanese War, wounded in the Battle of Tsushima
- Andrey Vladimirovich Ryabukhin, Rear Admiral, Deputy Commander of Pacific Fleet

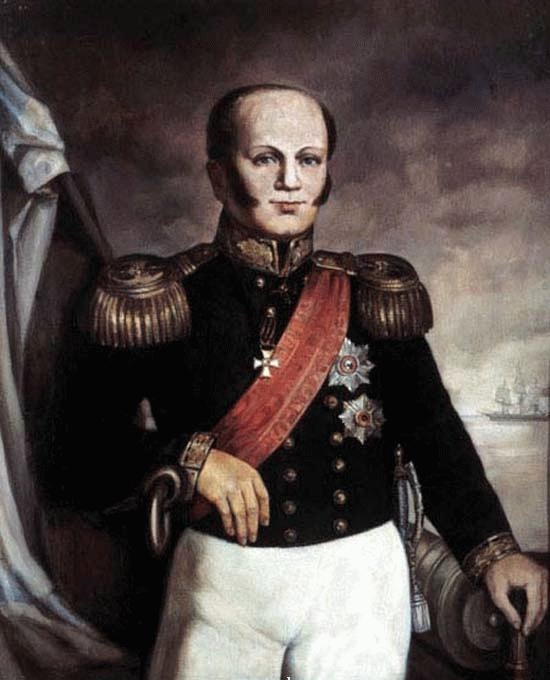
Senyavin

=== S ===
- Naum Akimovich Senyavin, Vice admiral, won the Battle of Osel during the Great Northern War
- Aleksey Naumovich Senyavin, re-established the Don Military Flotilla and played a crucial role in Russia's gaining access to the Black Sea
- Dmitriy Nikolayevich Senyavin, Admiral, won the battles of the Dardanelles and Athos against Ottomans during the Napoleonic Wars
- Nikolay Dmitriyevich Sergeyev, Fleet admiral, Chief of the Main Navy Staff/First Deputy Commander-in-Chief of the Soviet Navy
- Vladimir Vasilyevich Sidorov, admiral, commander of the Baltic and Pacific Fleets
- Peter von Sivers (1674-1740) chaired the Russian Admiralty Board in 1728-32.
- Nikolai Ivanovich Smirnov, Fleet admiral, Commander of the Pacific Fleet
- Igor Vladimirovich Smolyak, rear admiral, commander of the Leningrad Naval Base
- Viktor Nikolayevich Sokolov, Admiral, commander of the Black Sea Fleet
- Emil Nikolayevich Spiridonov (1925-1981), Commander of the Pacific Fleet
- Grigoriy Andreyevich Spiridov, Admiral, destroyed the Ottoman fleet in the Battle of Chesma during the Russo-Turkish War (1768-1774)
- Yuri Vladimirovich Startsev, vice admiral, commander of the Caspian Flotilla
- Georgy Andreyevich Stepanov, vice admiral, commander during the Second World War
- Ivan Ivanovich Stronskiy, Rear Admiral, (1846-1901), Russo-Turkish War (1877-1878), followed the Order of service to Alfred, Duke of Edinburgh in 1876.
- Gennady Aleksandrovich Suchkov, Admiral, commander of the Pacific and Northern Fleets
- Yuri Nikolayevich Sysuyev, Admiral, commander of the 5th Operational Squadron, Higher Special Officer Classes of the Navy, and the Kuznetsov Naval Academy

=== T ===
- Aleksandr Arkadevich Tatarinov, Admiral, commanded the Russian Black Sea Fleet, First Deputy Commander-in-Chief of the Russian Navy.
- Jean de Traversay, Admiral, commanded the Russian Black Sea Fleet and Russian Baltic Fleet, organised early Russian circumnavigations
- Vladimir Filippovich Tributs, Admiral, commander of the Soviet Baltic Fleet during the siege of Leningrad, led the Soviet evacuation of Tallinn

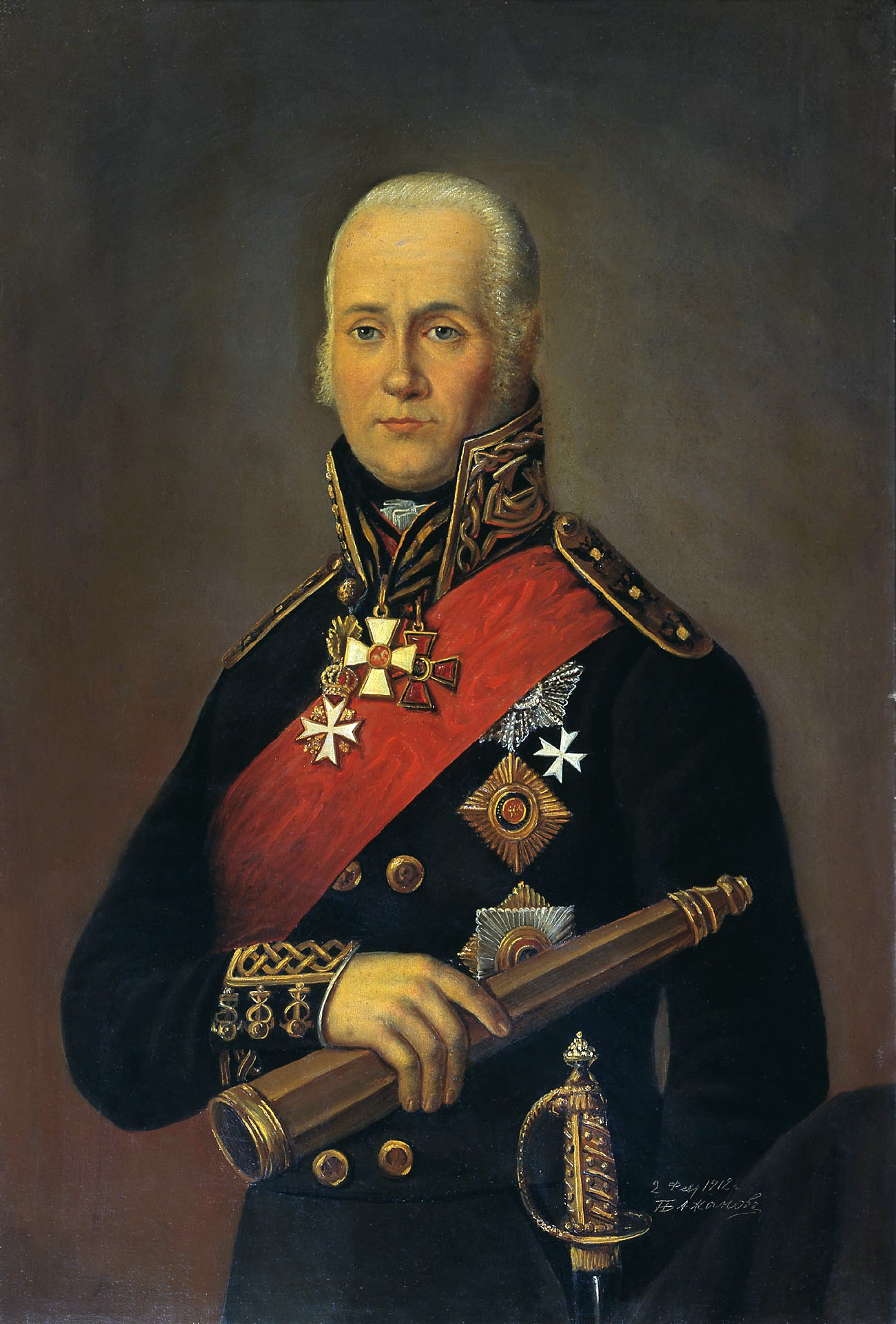
Ushakov

=== U ===
- Fyodor Fyodorovich Ushakov, the most illustrious Russian Admiral of the 18th century, saint, won the battles of Fidonisi, Kerch Strait, Tendra and Cape Kaliakra during the Russo-Turkish War (1787–1792), single-handedly carved out the Greek Septinsular Republic, did not lose a single ship in 43 battles

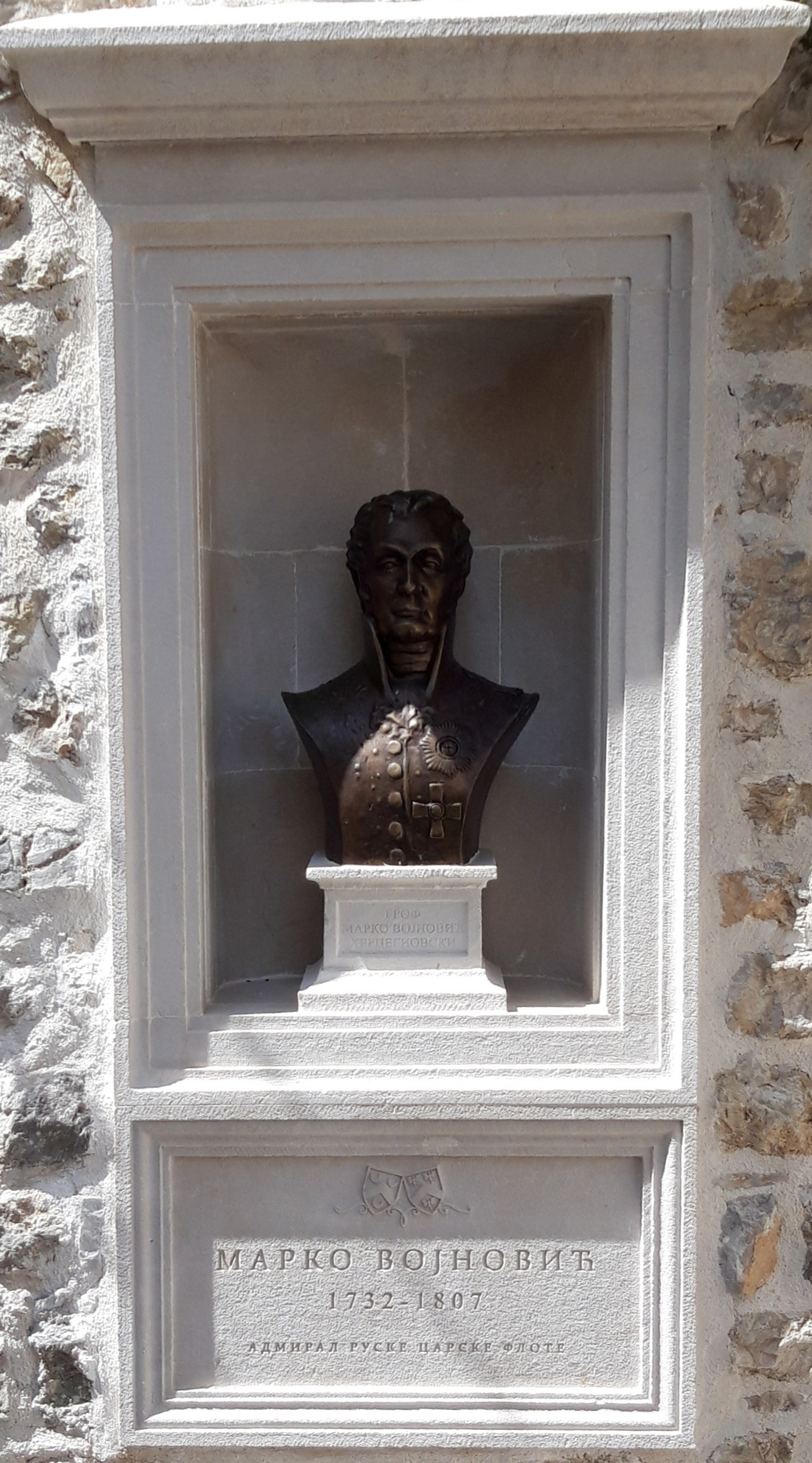
Voinovich (Vojnović)

=== V ===
- Vladimir Prokofyevich Valuyev, admiral, commander of the Baltic Fleet
- Valery Vladimirovich Varfolomeyev, rear admiral, submarine officer, commander of the 11th Submarine Division
- Viktor Konstantinovich Vasilyev, rear admiral, academic of the Naval Academy
- Nikolai Ignatevich Vinogradov, admiral, submarine officer, commander of the Kamchatka Flotilla
- Aleksandr Viktorovich Vitko, Admiral, Deputy Commander-in-Chief Russian Navy
- Andrei Olgertovich Volozhinsky, Vice Admiral, Chief of Staff/1st Deputy CinC Russian Navy
- Vladimir Mikhailovich Vorobyov, admiral, deputy commander of the Russian Navy
- Vladimir Sergeyevich Vysotsky, Admiral, Commander-in-Chief of the Russian Navy
- Marko Ivanovich Voinovich (Vojnović in Serbian), one of the founders of the Black Sea Fleet, winner of the Battle of Fidonisi.

=== Y ===
- Nikolay Yuryevich Yakubovskiy, Rear Admiral, Chief of Staff/1st Deputy Commander of Caspian Flotilla
- Vladimir Anatolyevich Yakushev, Rear Admiral, Commander of the Primorsky Flotilla
- Nikolai Pavlovich Yegipko, Vice admiral, Hero of the Soviet Union
- Georgiy Mikhailovich Yegorov, Fleet admiral, Commander of the Northern Fleet
- Vladimir Grigoryevich Yegorov, Admiral, Commander Russian Baltic Fleet
- Oleg Aleksandrovich Yerofeyev, Admiral, Commander of Northern Fleet
- Vasily Petrovich Yeryomin, Admiral, deputy commander in chief of the Navy, head of the Kuznetsov Naval Academy
- Nikolay Anatolyevich Yevmenov, Admiral, Commander of Northern Fleet, Commander in Chief of the Navy
- Ivan Stepanovich Yumashev, Admiral, reclaimed Southern Sakhalin and Kuril Islands for the USSR during the Soviet–Japanese War, Commander-in-Chief of the Soviet Navy in the late 1940s

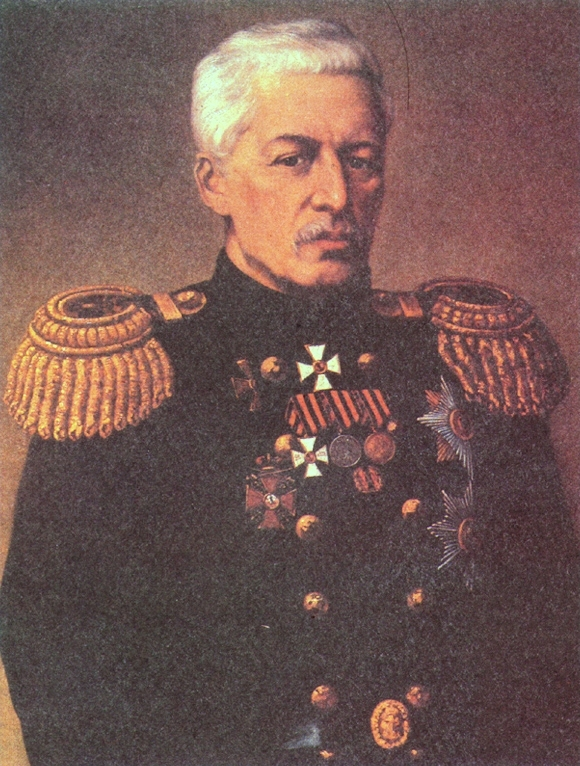
Zavoyko

=== Z ===
- Mikhail Nikolayevich Zakharov, admiral, political commissar
- Vasiliy Stepanovich Zavoyko, fought in the Battle of Navarino, twice circumnavigated the globe, explored the estuary of the Amur River, repelled the superior British-French forces in the siege of Petropavlovsk during the Crimean War
- Matija Zmajević, Vice admiral, hero of the battles of Gangut and Grengam during the Great Northern War
- Oleg Yuryevich Zverev, Rear admiral, commander of the Caspian Flotilla

== See also ==
- Russian Admiralty
