= Yakushev =

Yakushev (Russian: Я́кушев) is a Russian masculine surname, its feminine counterpart is Yakusheva. It may refer to:

- Alexander Yakushev (born 1947), Soviet ice hockey player
- Anatoli Yakushev (born 1980), Russian footballer
- Marina Yakusheva (born 1974), Russian badminton player
- Viktor Yakushev (1937–2001), Soviet ice hockey player
- Vladimir Yakushev (born 1968), Russian politician
- Vladimir Anatolyevich Yakushev (born 1970), Russian naval officer
