= Mukhametshin =

Mukhametshin (Russian: Мухаметшин) is a Russian Tatar surname. The feminine form is Mukhametshina (Russian: Мухаметшина). Among those with this name are:

- Farid Mukhametshin (b. 1947), politician, former Prime Minister of Tatarstan
- Farit Mukhametshin (b. 1947), politician and diplomat
- Igor Mukhametshin (b. 1963), naval officer
- Ruslan Mukhametshin (b. 1981), footballer and coach
- Rustem Mukhametshin (b. 1984), footballer
