= Õisu =

Borough in Estonia

- Village
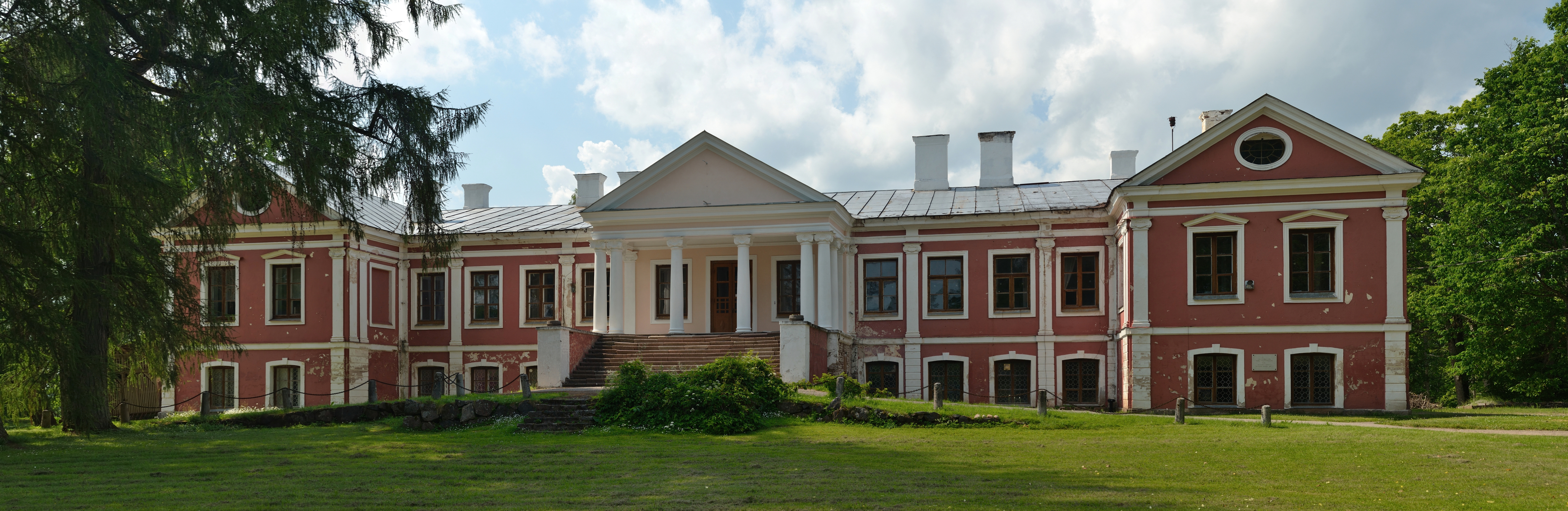
- Õisu manor

- Location in Estonia
- Coordinates: 58°11′56″N 25°32′46″E
- Country: Estonia
- County: Viljandi County
- Municipality: Mulgi Parish

Population (2021)
  - Total: 191

Õisu (German: Euseküll) is a small borough in Mulgi Parish, Viljandi County, in southern Estonia.

== Õisu manor ==
A manorial estate was established in Õisu in the 16th century, and during the Swedish time it appears to at some point have belonged to one Jesper Kruse. In 1744, during the Imperial Russian time the estate was donated by the Empress Elizabeth to the widow of Admiral Peter von Sievers. It stayed in the von Sievers family until the Estonian Declaration of Independence and the ensuing land reform when the estate was nationalised and turned into an agricultural school.

The current building was built in 1760–1767 and slightly altered in the 19th century. A wide granite staircase leads up to a pedimented entrance, flanked by two Italian sculptures of Justice and Prudence. A few interior details have been preserved, such as a cocklestove in Empire style, decorated with Russian eagles in brass. Behind the main house, a park laid out in the English style by G. Kuphaldt descends towards Lake Õisu. Several outbuildings have also been preserved, and a few kilometres away stands the family burial chapel of the von Sievers family.

== Notable people ==
The Estonian statesman, diplomat, military officer, and journalist Heinrich Laretei was born in Õisu in 1892.

== See also ==
- Lake Õisu
- Õisu Landscape Conservation Area
