= Russian ship Vsevolod Bobrov =

Russian logistics support vessel

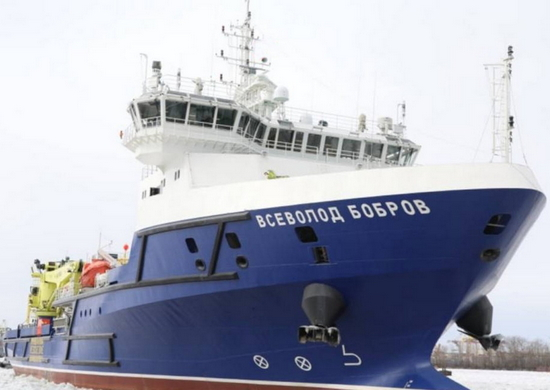

History

Russian Navy
- Name: Vsevolod Bobrov
- Namesake: Vsevolod Bobrov
- Ordered: June 2012
- Builder: Severnaya Verf Shipyard
- Laid down: 2013
- Launched: November 2016
- Commissioned: 8 August 2021
- Identification: IMO number: 4726999; MMSI number: 273549340; Call Sign: RLO52

General characteristics
- Class & type: Elbrus-class logistics support vessel
- Displacement: 10,000 tons
- Length: 95 m (311 ft 8 in)
- Beam: 22 m (72 ft 2 in)
- Draft: 9 m (29 ft 6 in)
- Ice class: Arc4
- Installed power: 17.8 MW (23,900 hp)
- Propulsion: Four diesel engines
- Speed: 18 knots (33 km/h; 21 mph)
- Range: 5,000 nmi (9,300 km; 5,800 mi)
- Crew: 27

Vsevolod Bobrov is an Elbrus-class logistics support vessel in the Russian Navy. Built by the Severnaya Verf Shipyard from 2013 to 2021, the ship is used for transporting dry cargo, water, and ammunition, as well as providing search-and-rescue, medical support, and towing capabilities. The ship was named after the Soviet football and ice hockey player Vsevolod Bobrov.

== Characteristics ==
The Vsevolod Bobrov is the second ship in the Project 23120 Elbrus class, and is designated as a logistics support vessel in the Russian Navy. It has a bulbous bow and is made of a steel hull which is ice-strengthened to be compliant with the Arc4 ice class. The ship measures 95 m (311 ft 8 in) long and 22 m (72 ft 2 in) wide, with a draft of 9 m (29 ft 6 in). It has a crew of 27 and is capable of carrying 43 passengers. The Vsevolod Bobrov has improved characteristics over the first Elbrus class, the Elbrus, including an upgraded deck and communication and navigation systems.

The ship has a displacement of roughly 10,000 t and can transport 2,000 t of cargo in up to 40 shipping containers. The cargo deck is 700 m^{2} (7,500 ft^{2}) in size and has two electro-hydraulic cranes and two towing winches. There are also two inflatable boats for transportation or conducting rescue missions, and the Vsevolod Bobrov is capable of acting as a mothership for smaller submersibles conducting underwater search-and-rescue missions.

The ship is powered by four diesel engines which provide 17.8 MW (23,900 hp) of power. It has bow-mounted rudder propellers and thrusters, as well as a positioning system which allows the ship to maintain its position in heavy sea state. It can sail at a maximum of 18 knots (33 km/h; 21 mph), and can achieve a range of 5,000 nautical miles (9,300 km; 5,800 mi) at 12 knots (22 km/h; 14 mph). In Arctic conditions, it can navigate through 80 cm (2.6 ft) thick ice at a speed of 2 knots (3.7 km/h; 2.3 mph).

The navigation bridge is located on the top of the deck towards the front of the ship, and has X-band and S-band radars as well as GLONASS capabilities. There is a medical bay with six beds, firefighting equipment, and a decompression chamber for divers. It also has a small flight deck which can host two Kamov Ka-27 helicopters.

== History ==
=== Construction ===
The Vsevolod Bobrov was designed by JSC Spetssudoproekt Design Bureau in St. Petersburg and built at the shipyard in Severnaya Verf. The order for three Elbrus-class vessels was placed in June 2012, and construction began on Vsevolod Bobrov in 2013. Its hull was completed in March 2016, and it was launched in November 2016. In 2021, the vessel underwent sea trials in the Baltic Sea for roughly a month, testing its systems with a trial crew of around 100 in addition to its crew of 27. The vessel was officially accepted into the Russian Navy on 8 August 2021 by the Commission for State Acceptance of Ships.

=== Black Sea Fleet ===
On 21 August 2021, the St. Andrew's flag was raised aboard the Vsevolod Bobrov in a ceremony with Vice Admiral Igor Mukhametshin at Kronstadt. The ship set sail to join the Black Sea Fleet at the end of August along with the mine defense ship Georgy Kurbatov, and arrived at its permanent base of Novorossiysk Naval Base in January 2022.

=== 2022 Russian invasion of Ukraine ===
On the night of 11–12 May, Vsevolod Bobrov was transiting in the Black Sea towards Snake Island. According to Ukrainian military intelligence sources, a major fire broke out on the ship overnight which caused damage and forced some or all of the crew to evacuate, and was the result of an unconfirmed Ukrainian attack on the ship. However, no evidence for this claim was brought by either Ukrainian source, and later reporting by Radio Svoboda and Russian Navy sources appear to indicate that the Vsevolod Bobrov returned to port in Sevastopol without suffering any major or visible damage by 14 May.
