= Õisu Landscape Conservation Area =

Protected area in Estonia

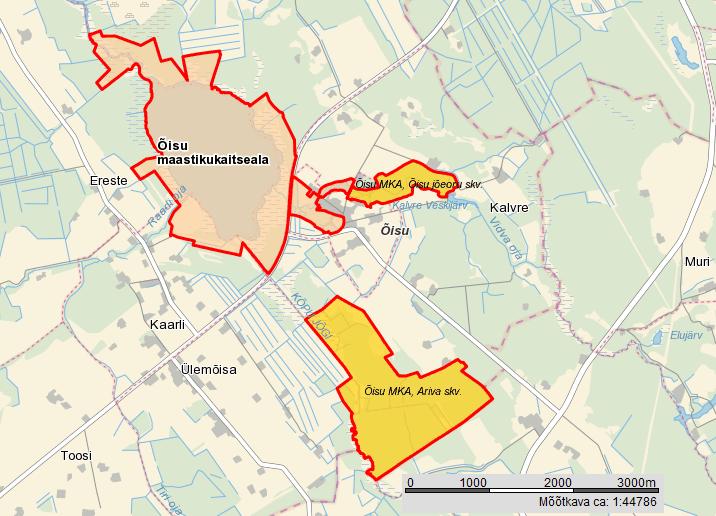

- Location within Estonia
- Location: Estonia
- Coordinates: 58°12′N 25°32′E
- Area: 596 ha (1,470 acres)
- Established: 1959 (2006)

Õisu Landscape Conservation Area is a nature reserve situated in Viljandi County, Estonia.

Its area is 595.5 ha.

The protected area was designated in 1959 to protect the nature of Õisu and its surroundings, including Lake Õisu. In 2006, the protected area was redesigned to the landscape conservation area.
