= Adrian Nepenin =

WWI Russian admiral

Adrian Ivanovich Nepenin
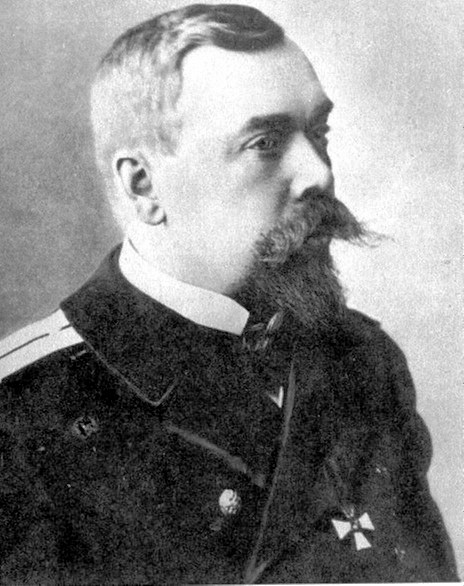
- Lieutenant Nepenin, c. 1900.
- Born: 2 November 1871; Velikiye Luki, Pskov Governorate, Russian Empire
- Died: 17 March 1917 (aged 45); Helsinki, Finland, Russian Empire
- Burial place: Helsinki Orthodox Cemetery, Finland
- Military career
- Allegiance: Russian Empire
- Branch: Imperial Russian Navy
- Service years: 1892–1917
- Rank: Vice admiral
- Commands: Baltic Fleet
- Conflicts: Boxer Rebellion; Russo-Japanese War; World War I

Adrian (Andrian) Ivanovich Nepenin (Russian: Адриа́н (Андриа́н) Ива́нович Непе́нин; 2 November 1871 – 17 March 1917) was a Russian admiral. As a naval officer, he was credited with his effective leadership of the naval intelligence and communication services in the Baltic Fleet. He briefly served as the fleet commander during World War I (1916–17), up until the February Revolution, and was most notable for his action in Finland during those events.

== Early life and career ==
Nepenin was born on 2 November 1871 in the Pskov Governorate of the Russian Empire. He graduated from the Naval Cadet Corps in 1892 as a midshipman. He served in both the Baltic and Pacific oceans, taking part in the expedition to China during the Boxer Rebellion in 1900. Nepenin was onboard the Russian gunboat Mandzhur in Shanghai when the Russo-Japanese War broke out in early 1904. The crew scuttled the gunboat after it was blockaded within Shanghai by the Japanese, and they later made their way to Russian territory. During the siege of Port Arthur, Nepenin commanded the torpedo boat Storozhevoi.

== World War I ==
Nepenin was sent to the Baltic Fleet to command its signals intelligence and communications after the war with Japan, and was promoted to captain 1st rank in 1911. This put him in charge of the radio stations and observation posts on the coast, the purpose of which was to report on enemy movements to Russian warships and the fleet staff. He oversaw the signals intelligence service from his headquarters in Revel. The work consisted of decoding German radio communications and using of direction finding.

When World War I broke out, Nepenin's role became extremely important for the commanders of the Baltic Fleet, because they depended on him for reliable information about the actions and intentions of German warships. The Russian capture of the German cruiser SMS Magdeburg and its code books early on in the war assisted the work of him and his office. Nepenin gained the reputation of being a very capable officer for his effective management of the signals intelligence service as well as for his ability to use available information to accurately predict the plans of the German navy. But his work also left him with a lack of experience in commanding a fleet.

In September 1916 Russian naval leaders successfully pressured Emperor Nicholas II to relieve Admiral Vasily Kanin of command of the Baltic Fleet for his passivity and lax command style. Vice Admiral Nepenin was appointed in his place as commander of the Baltic Fleet. He was popular among the crews and there was hope that his active leadership style would bring more success in the war. Nepenin's appointment was close to the start of the winter dormancy of the fleet as they waited for the sea ice in the Baltic to clear in the following spring, beginning the campaign (ice-free) season. He planned operations for the 1917 campaign season, including the amphibious landing of ground troops into enemy territory, something that was also being planned by his Black Sea Fleet counterpart in the south, Admiral Alexander Kolchak.

== February Revolution ==
The Baltic Fleet became the site of the most violence during the events of the February Revolution in 1917 and they ended with sailors associated with the Bolsheviks taking control, so these events were nicknamed "October in February." The Kronstadt naval base, twenty miles outside of Petrograd, was taken over by rebellious sailors after they heard that the Petrograd garrison had joined anti-government protestors. There were no loyal units there for the officers to use to maintain control, and all of them were either arrested or murdered by the sailors, including the base commander, Vice Admiral Robert Viren, who was killed.

Nepenin, who was with the active fleet at its base in Helsinki, heard about the Kronstadt massacre the following day and tried to minimize the news of the crisis. He was known for being one of the more progressive officers in the navy, and when he was informed that the Provisional Committee of the State Duma had taken power, he recognized it as the legitimate authority. But he wanted to be cautious after hearing about what happened in Kronstadt and was also asked to delay his announcement of the news to the sailors by the head of the Provisional Committee, Mikhail Rodzianko. But his slow announcements and refusal to allow demonstrations or to meet with sailors' delegates looked bad to the men of the active fleet that supported the revolution, and they were learning of these events from another source.

Because of this, some of the sailors started to believe that Nepenin did not sympathize with them or that he was planning to suppress the revolution. After Nepenin announced on 16 March the news of the abdication of Emperor Nicholas II, sailors on two battleships mutinied and killed or arrested their officers. Nepenin later met with representatives of this group and told them that he supported the Russian Provisional Government, but they refused his demands to release the detained officers, and later elected their own commander, Vice Admiral Andrei Maksimov, the most pro-revolutionary senior officer. On 17 March 1917, Maksimov arrived at Nepenin's flagship to take command of the fleet, which he refused to allow, and someone in the crowd that was with Maksimov then shot and killed Nepenin.

== Honours and awards ==
=== Domestic ===
- Order of St. Stanislaus, 3rd class (9 April 1900)
- Order of St. Anna, 3rd class with swords and a bow (28 December 1900)
- Order of St. Vladimir, 4th class with swords and a bow (11 October 1904)
- Order of St. George, 1st class (3 September 1905)
- Order of St. Stanislaus, 1st class (19 January 1915)
- Order of St. Anna, 1st class with swords (14 March 1916)

=== Foreign ===
- Emirate of Bukhara:
  - Order of the Noble Bukhara, 2nd class with silver star (1893)
- Empire of Japan:
  - Order of the Sacred Treasure, 4th class (1902)

== Sources ==
- Halpern, Paul G. (1994). A Naval History of World War I. Annapolis: Naval Institute Press. ISBN 978-1-61251-172-6.
- Mawdsley, Evan (1978). The Russian Revolution and the Baltic Fleet: War and Politics, February 1917 – April 1918. London: Macmillan. ISBN 978-1-349-03761-2.
- McLaughlin, Stephen (2014). Tucker, Spencer C. (ed.). World War I: The Definitive Encyclopedia and Document Collection. Santa Barbara: ABC-CLIO. ISBN 978-1-85109-965-8.
- McLaughlin, Stephen (2015). Dowling, Timothy C. (ed.). Russia at War: From the Mongol Conquest to Afghanistan, Chechnya, and Beyond. Vol. 2: N–Z. Santa Barbara: ABC-CLIO. ISBN 978-1-59884-948-6.
- McMeekin, Sean (2017). The Russian Revolution: A New History. New York: Basic Books. ISBN 978-0-465-09497-4.
- Sondhaus, Lawrence (2014). The Great War at Sea: A Naval History of the First World War. Cambridge: Cambridge University Press. ISBN 978-1-107-03690-1.
- Timirev, S. N. (2020) [1961]. The Russian Baltic Fleet in the Time of War and Revolution 1914–1918: The Recollections of Admiral S. N. Timirev. Barnsley: Pen and Sword Books. ISBN 978-1-5267-7705-8.

Military offices
Preceded by Vasily Kanin	Commander of the Imperial Baltic Fleet; 1916–1917	Succeeded by Andrei Maksimov
