= Vasily Kanin =

WWI Russian admiral

- Васи́лий Ка́нин
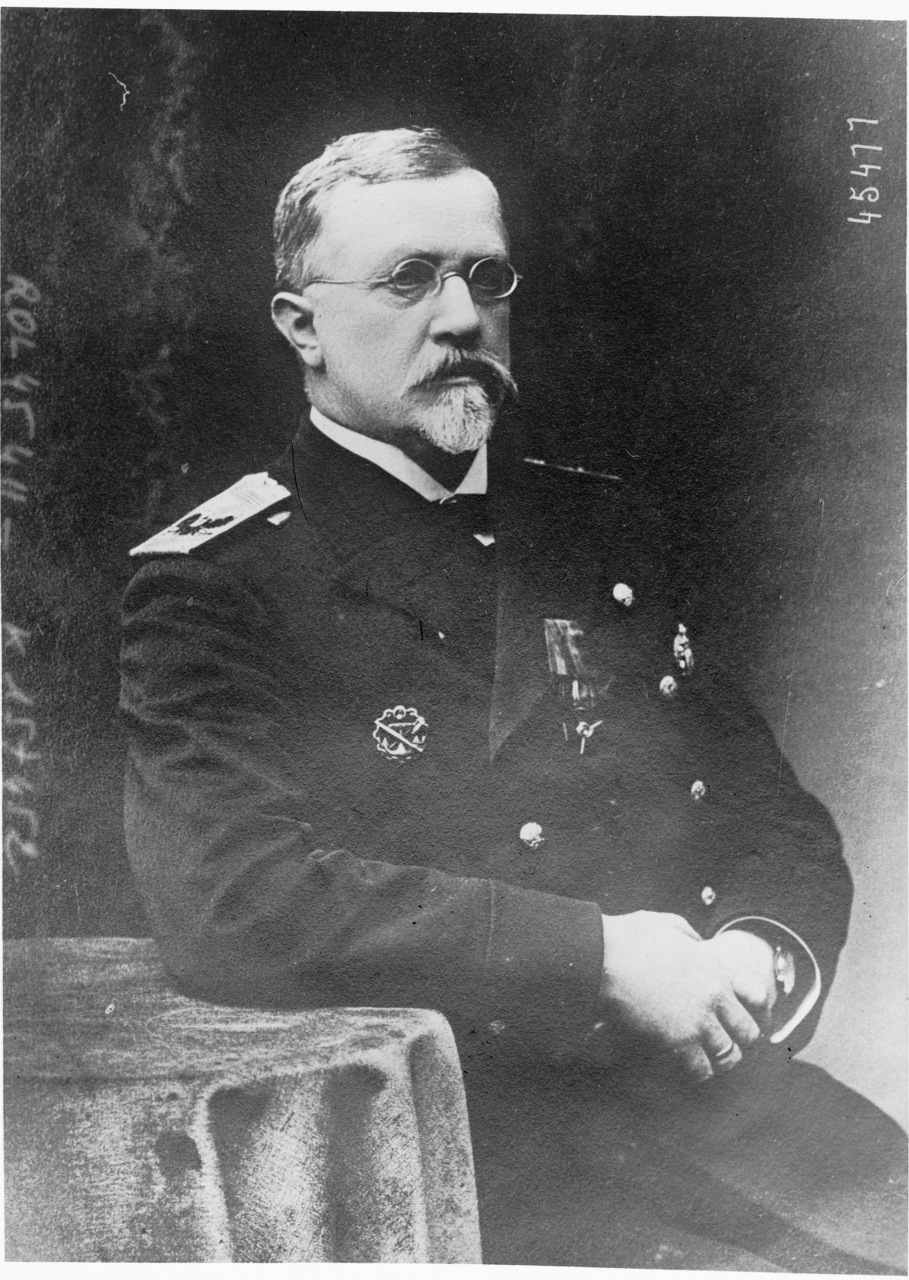
- Rear Admiral Kanin c. 1913–15
- Born: December 23, 1862; Baku, Russian Empire
- Died: June 17, 1927 (aged 64); Marseille, France
- Military career
- Allegiance: Russian Empire; (Russian Empire) South Russia
- Branch: Imperial Russian Navy
- Service years: 1882–1919
- Rank: Admiral
- Commands: Baltic Fleet
- Conflicts: Boxer Rebellion; World War I; Battle of the Gulf of Riga; Russian Civil War

Vasily Alexandrovich Kanin (Russian: Васи́лий Алекса́ндрович Ка́нин; 23 December 1862 – 17 June 1927) was a Russian admiral and a member of the State Council of the Russian Empire. He commanded the Baltic Fleet during World War I (1915–16), served on the Admiralty Board (1917), and commanded the Black Sea Fleet of the Armed Forces of South Russia during the Russian Civil War (1918–19).

== Early life and career ==
Vasily Kanin was born on 23 December 1862. He graduated from the Naval Cadet Corps in 1882 as a midshipman and completed the Naval Mine Officers' Course in 1891.

After initially serving in the Baltic Fleet, Kanin was transferred to the Pacific and took part in the expedition to China during the Boxer Rebellion of 1900. He later served in the Black Sea Fleet before returning to the Baltic in 1911 to command a Destroyer Flotilla. In December 1913 he became a Rear Admiral and led the minelayer detachment. This made him responsible for both setting up minefields and also defending them using a force of light warships.

== World War I ==
When World War I broke out, Kanin led the creation of a minefield at the entrance to the Gulf of Finland on 31 July 1914. According to another officer, Kanin successfully organized the operation to create the main defensive minefield of 2,200 mines within two days, and without losing a single casualty. He was described as being a capable officer with a high level of technical expertise, and became the closest advisor of the Baltic Fleet commander, Admiral Nikolai Ottovich von Essen. From 12 to 14 January 1915 he led an operation to lay mines in German waters. His detachment continued its mission even when they learned that a force of German ships was close to them. He was given credit for the operation, but reportedly he wanted to withdraw but was persuaded not to by one of his subordinates, Captain 1st Rank Alexander Kolchak.

Kanin was promoted to Vice Admiral on 22 February 1915, and on 20 May he became the commander of the Baltic Fleet after the death of Admiral Essen from an illness. He was chosen partly because Essen's preferred successor had a German surname. Compared to Essen, Kanin had a more lax command style. During his tenure, there was some disagreement between Kanin and Captain Francis Cromie, the commander of the British Royal Navy's Baltic submarine flotilla, regarding the usage of British submarines. On 23 April 1916 Kanin was promoted to Admiral. He oversaw some successful operations as the fleet commander (including the Battle of the Gulf of Riga in 1915), but Emperor Nicholas II was persuaded by other naval leaders to replace Kanin in September 1916 because they believed his leadership was too passive. He was succeeded by Vice Admiral Adrian Nepenin.

== Revolution and civil war ==
In January 1917 he became a member of the Admiralty Board and the State Council, before retiring in December of that year, after the October Revolution.

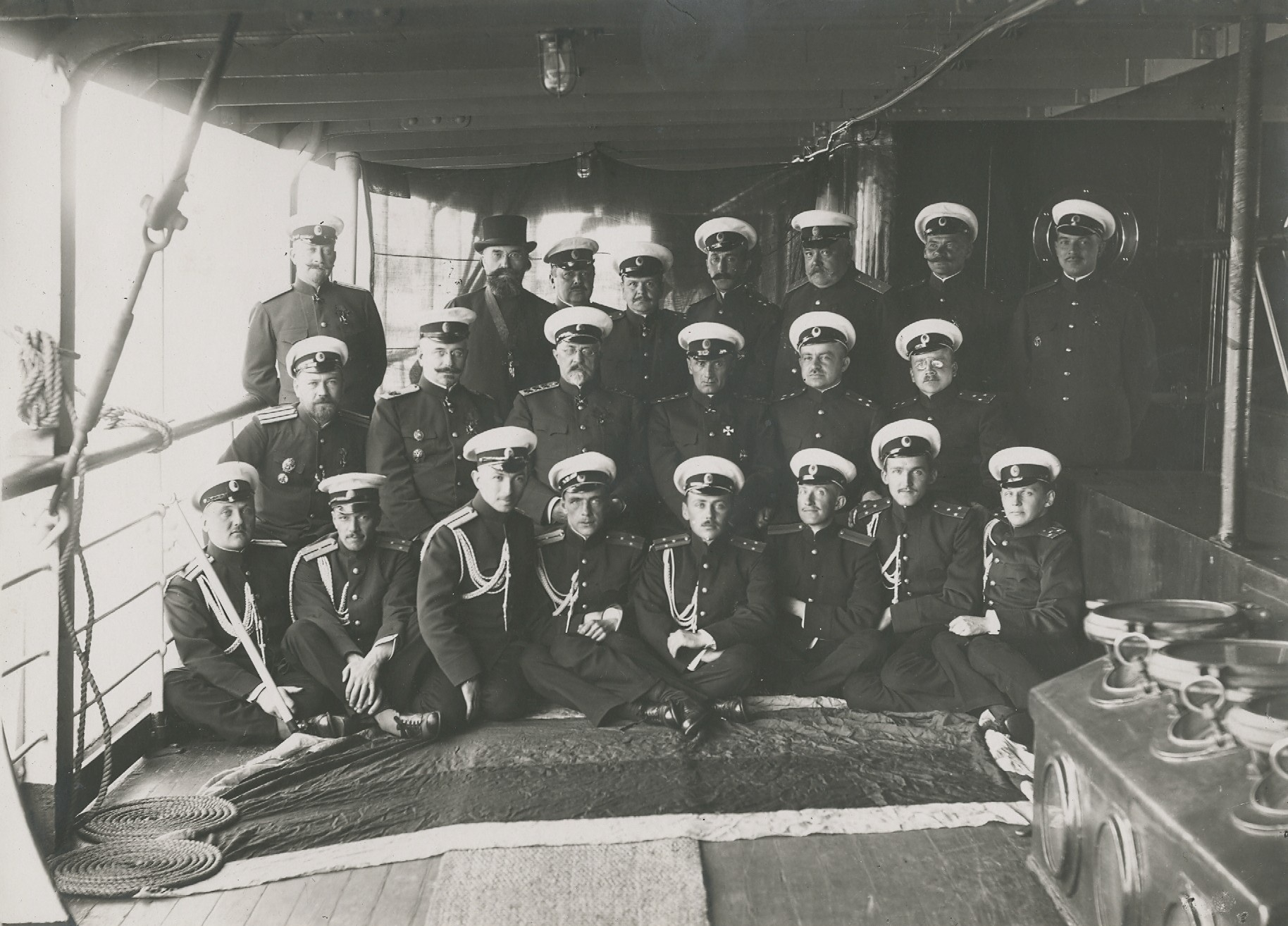
Baltic Fleet staff in 1916, including Kanin (third from the left, middle row), with Alexander Kolchak to his right, and Vasily Altfater is the first in the middle row on the left.

Kanin joined the Armed Forces of South Russia during the Russian Civil War and served as the commander of their nearly defunct Black Sea Fleet from November 1918 until early 1919. In 1920 he emigrated to France, where he died in Marseille on 17 June 1927.

== Sources ==
- Halpern, Paul G. (1994). A Naval History of World War I. Annapolis: Naval Institute Press. ISBN 978-1-61251-172-6.
- McLaughlin, Stephen (2017). Kalic, Sean N.; Brown, Gates M. (eds.). Russian Revolution of 1917: The Essential Reference Guide. Santa Barbara: ABC-CLIO. ISBN 978-1-4408-5093-6.
- McLaughlin, Stephen (2015). Dowling, Timothy C. (ed.). Russia at War: From the Mongol Conquest to Afghanistan, Chechnya, and Beyond. Vol. 2: N–Z. Santa Barbara: ABC-CLIO. ISBN 978-1-59884-948-6.
- Timirev, S. N. (2020) [1961]. The Russian Baltic Fleet in the Time of War and Revolution 1914–1918: The Recollections of Admiral S. N. Timirev. Barnsley: Pen and Sword Books. ISBN 978-1-5267-7705-8.

Military offices
Preceded by Nikolai Ottovich von Essen	Commander of the Imperial Baltic Fleet; 1915–1916	Succeeded by Adrian Nepenin
