= Lake Õisu =

Lake in Estonia

- Õisu järv (Estonian)
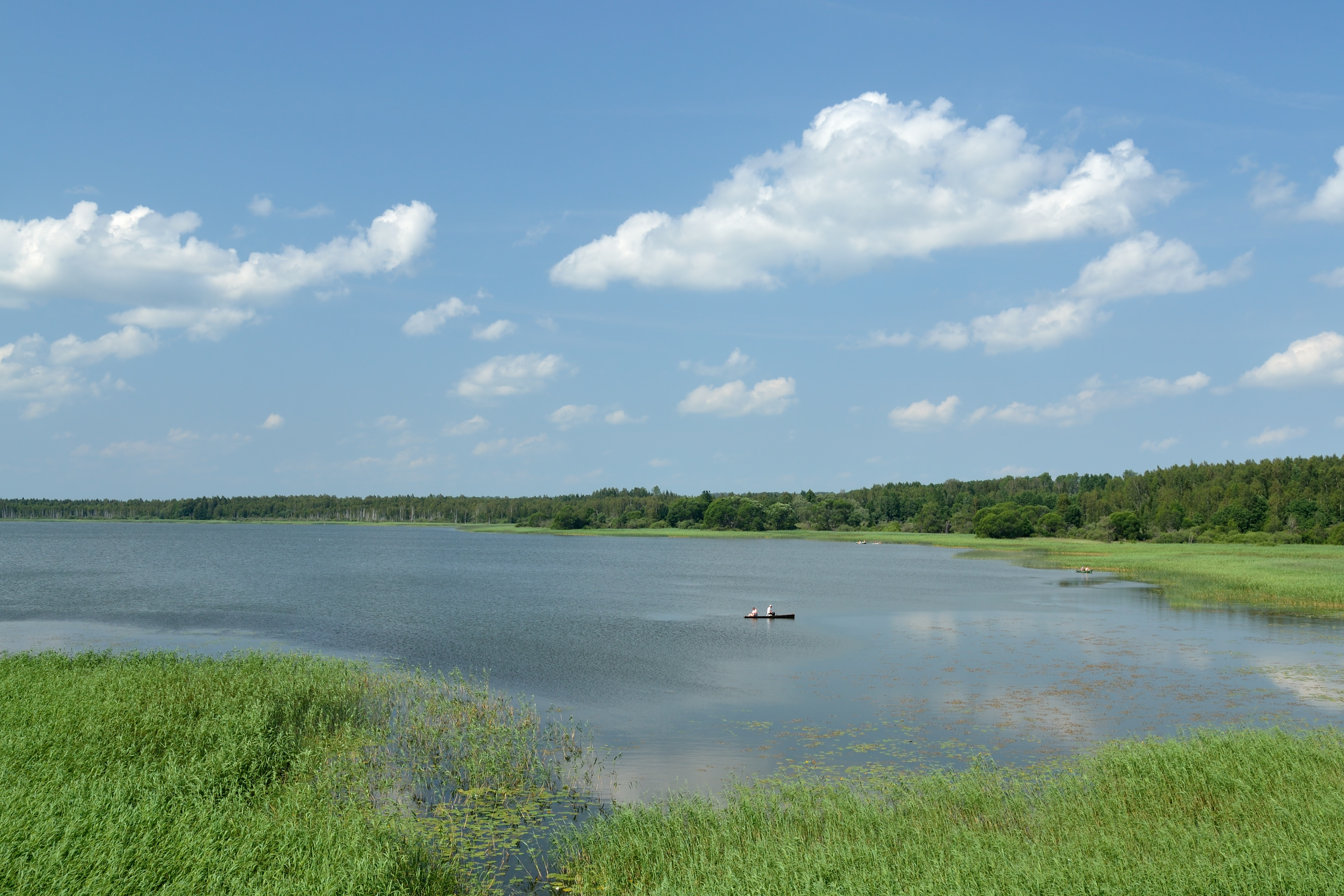

- Location within Estonia
- Location: Ereste, Mulgi Parish, Viljandi County, Estonia
- Coordinates: 58°12.5′N 25°31′E
- Basin countries: Estonia
- Max. length: 2,300 meters (7,500 ft)
- Surface area: 190.9 hectares (472 acres)
- Average depth: 2.8 meters (9 ft 2 in)
- Max. depth: 4.3 meters (14 ft)
- Shore length^{1}: 5,252,000 cubic meters (185,500,000 cu ft)
- Surface elevation: 45.8 meters (150 ft)
- ^{1} Shore length is not a well-defined measure.

Lake Õisu (Estonian: Õisu järv) is a lake in southern Estonia. It is located in the village of Ereste in Mulgi Parish, Viljandi County, just west of Õisu. The lake and its surroundings are covered by the Õisu Landscape Conservation Area.

== Physical description ==
The lake has an area of 190.9 hectares (472 acres). The lake has an average depth of 2.8 meters (9 ft 2 in) and a maximum depth of 4.3 meters (14 ft). It is 2,300 meters (7,500 ft) long, and its shoreline measures 6,920 meters (22,700 ft). It has a volume of 5,252,000 cubic meters (185,500,000 cu ft).

== See also ==
- List of lakes of Estonia
