= Igor Petrov =

Soviet naval officer (1933–2020)

- Native name: Игорь Николаевич Петров
- Born: 27 June 1933; Andreyevsky, Sholsky District, Russian SFSR, USSR
- Died: 14 April 2020 (aged 86) Saint Petersburg, Russia
- Allegiance: Soviet Union
- Branch: Soviet Navy
- Service years: 1955–1991
- Rank: Rear-Admiral
- Awards: Order of the Red Star; Order "For Service to the Homeland in the Armed Forces of the USSR" 3rd class

Igor Nikolayevich Petrov (Russian: Игорь Николаевич Петров; 27 June 1933 – 14 April 2020) was a high-ranking career officer of the Soviet Navy. After several decades of service in the Northern Fleet and aboard submarines, he rose to the rank of rear-admiral and held senior positions in the navy's political branch.

Born in 1933, Petrov lived through the Second World War and the Axis invasion of the Soviet Union. Working at first as a shepherd, and training at a teaching college, he was eventually called up for military service, and studied at the A. A. Zhdanov Naval Political School. He then entered the navy's Northern Fleet, where he would spend most of his career. Petrov at first served aboard destroyers in the surface fleet as officer for the Komsomol organization, and after further studies joined the submarine branch as a deputy commander for political affairs on several of the Northern Fleet's submarines. By the late 1960s he had risen to serve as political officer in staff positions and by the late 1970s he was deputy head of the navy's Political Directorate.

From the early 1980s Petrov was active in academic affairs, heading the Social Research department at the Ministry of Defence's Institute of Military Theory and History, and serving as deputy head of the Department of Social, Political and Psychological Research. He then became head of the naval faculty at the Institute of Military History, having received the degree of candidate of historical sciences. From 1988 until his retirement in 1991 he was head of the naval faculty at the V. I. Lenin Military-Political Academy. Retiring with the rank of rear-admiral, Petrov spent ten years as dean of the faculty of the Institute of Economics and Law, and authored over 100 scientific and journalistic articles. Over his career he had received various honours and awards, including the Order of the Red Star, the Order "For Service to the Homeland in the Armed Forces of the USSR" 3rd class, and various medals. He died in 2020.

== Early career ==
Petrov was born on 27 June 1933 in the village of Andreyevsky, then part of Sholsky District, in the Russian Soviet Federative Socialist Republic, in the Soviet Union. His father was chief accountant in a timber industry enterprise in Konevo. When his father was transferred to Andoma in 1937, he and his family moved to Vytegra. Igor Petrov lived through the Axis invasion of the Soviet Union in 1941, and the subsequent campaigns to defeat the invaders. At the age of ten he was sent to work as an assistant shepherd on a collective farm in Vologda Oblast, and resumed his schooling after the defeat of the Nazi forces. After graduating from high school he attended the Vytegorsk Pedagogical College, taking a degree in history, but subsequently embarked on a career as a naval officer after being conscripted into service on 29 June 1952 by the Vytegorsky District Military Commissariat. He enrolled at Leningrad's A. A. Zhdanov Naval Political School on 1 July that year, and graduated in 1955.

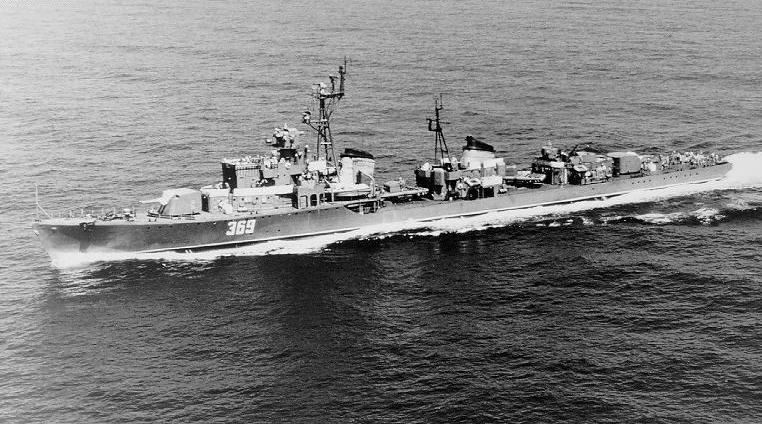
The Skoryy-class destroyer Seryozniy, of the same class as Petrov's first ship, Otrazhayuschiy

On graduating, and receiving a commission as an officer, Petrov was dispatched on 22 October 1955 to join the political administration of the Northern Fleet. Here he became secretary of the Komsomol organization aboard the Skoryy-class destroyer Otrazhayuschiy, part of the 122nd Destroyer Brigade. He continued in this position after 5 July 1956, when the Otrazhayuschiy was assigned to the 120th Destroyer Brigade of the Northern Fleet's 5th Cruiser Division. From 5 November 1958 until 1 September 1960 Petrov served ashore as an instructor in Komsomol work for the Northern Fleet's Political Department. On 1 September 1960 he was enrolled in the naval department of the V. I. Lenin Military-Political Academy, graduating on 30 June 1964.

== Submarine service ==
Petrov then returned to the Northern Fleet, where he became deputy commander for political affairs aboard the Zulu-class submarine B-76, part of the 4th Submarine Squadron. On 28 November 1964 B-76 was transferred to the 161st Submarine Brigade of the 4th Submarine Squadron. Petrov's next boat was the B-74, which he joined on 21 September 1965 while she was under repair at Leningrad Naval Base. He sailed with her to join the Northern Fleet's 161st Submarine Brigade after her repairs were completed, and served on her until 24 May 1966. Petrov was then appointed deputy political officer to the commander of the Yankee-class submarine K-32, in the Northern Fleet's 12th Submarine Squadron. He held this position after K-32's transfer to the 31st Submarine Division on 14 January 1969, and stepped down on 30 September 1969 to become deputy head of the 12th Submarine Squadron's political department. From then until 13 February 1970 he fulfilled this role, before being appointed first deputy head of the 3rd Submarine Flotilla's political department. After four years in this post, on 13 February 1974, Petrov took up the position of Head of the Political Department, and Deputy Political Officer, of the Iokansky Naval Base. He also sat for a period as a member of the Military Council and head of the 11th Submarine Flotilla's political department.

== Senior staff positions ==
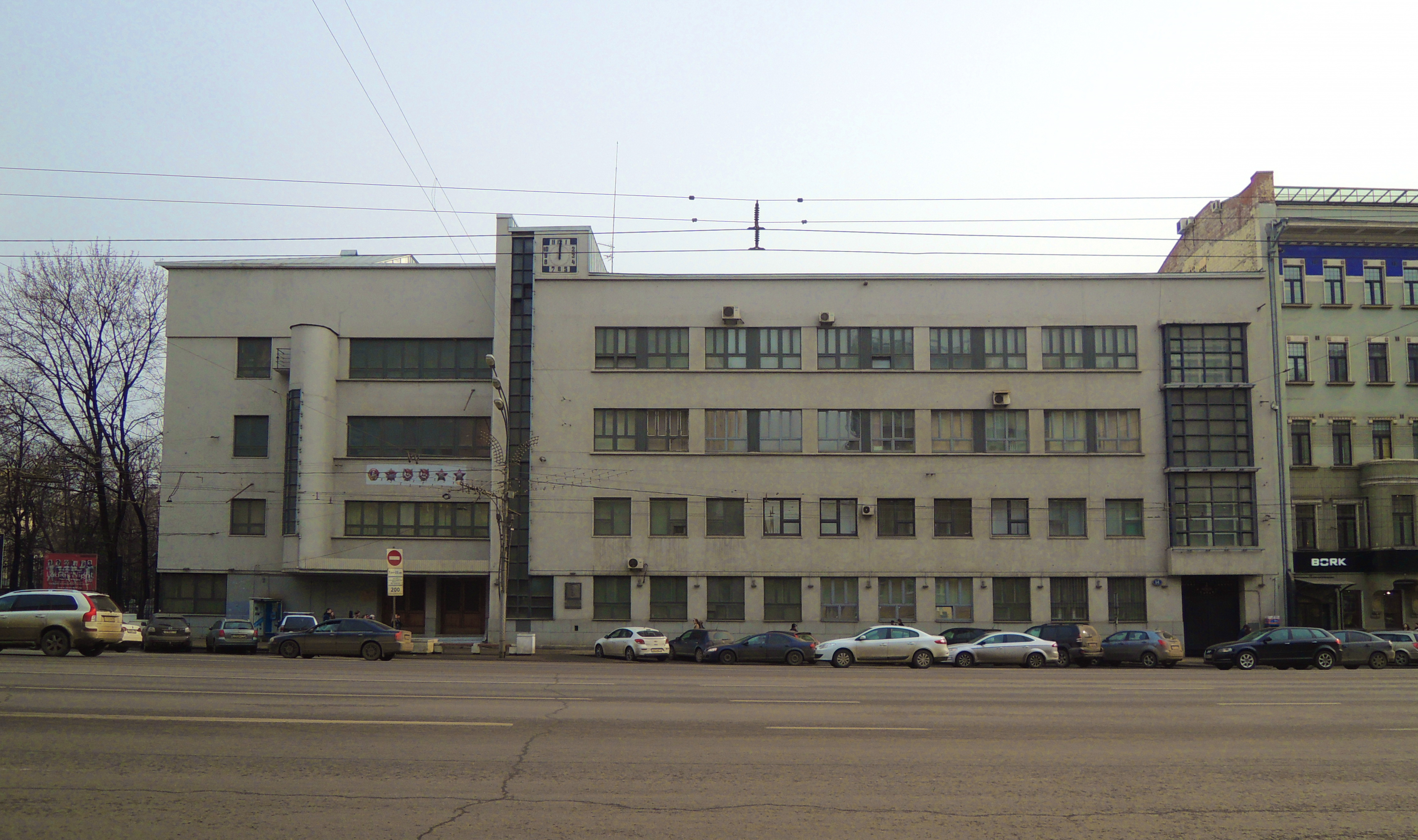
The V. I. Lenin Military-Political Academy, where Petrov studied, and was later head of its naval faculty

After taking the two-month long Academic Refresher Courses at the V. I. Lenin Military-Political Academy, graduating on 31 August 1978, Petrov was appointed Head of the Propaganda and Agitation Department and Deputy Head of the Navy's Political Directorate. This posting lasted until 6 August 1984 when Petrov became a deputy head of the Social Research department at the Ministry of Defence's Institute of Military Theory and History, and deputy head of the Department of Social, Political and Psychological Research. From 25 November 1985 until 27 July 1988 he was Head of the Naval Faculty at the Soviet Institute of Military History. He also received the degree of candidate of historical sciences. On 8 July 1988 the Ministry of Defence allowed for Petrov to continue on active military service until 1991. Between 23 July 1988 and 3 February 1991 he worked at the V. I. Lenin Military-Political Academy as head of the naval faculty, and then retired from service with the rank of rear-admiral, which he had held since 13 February 1976.

== In retirement ==
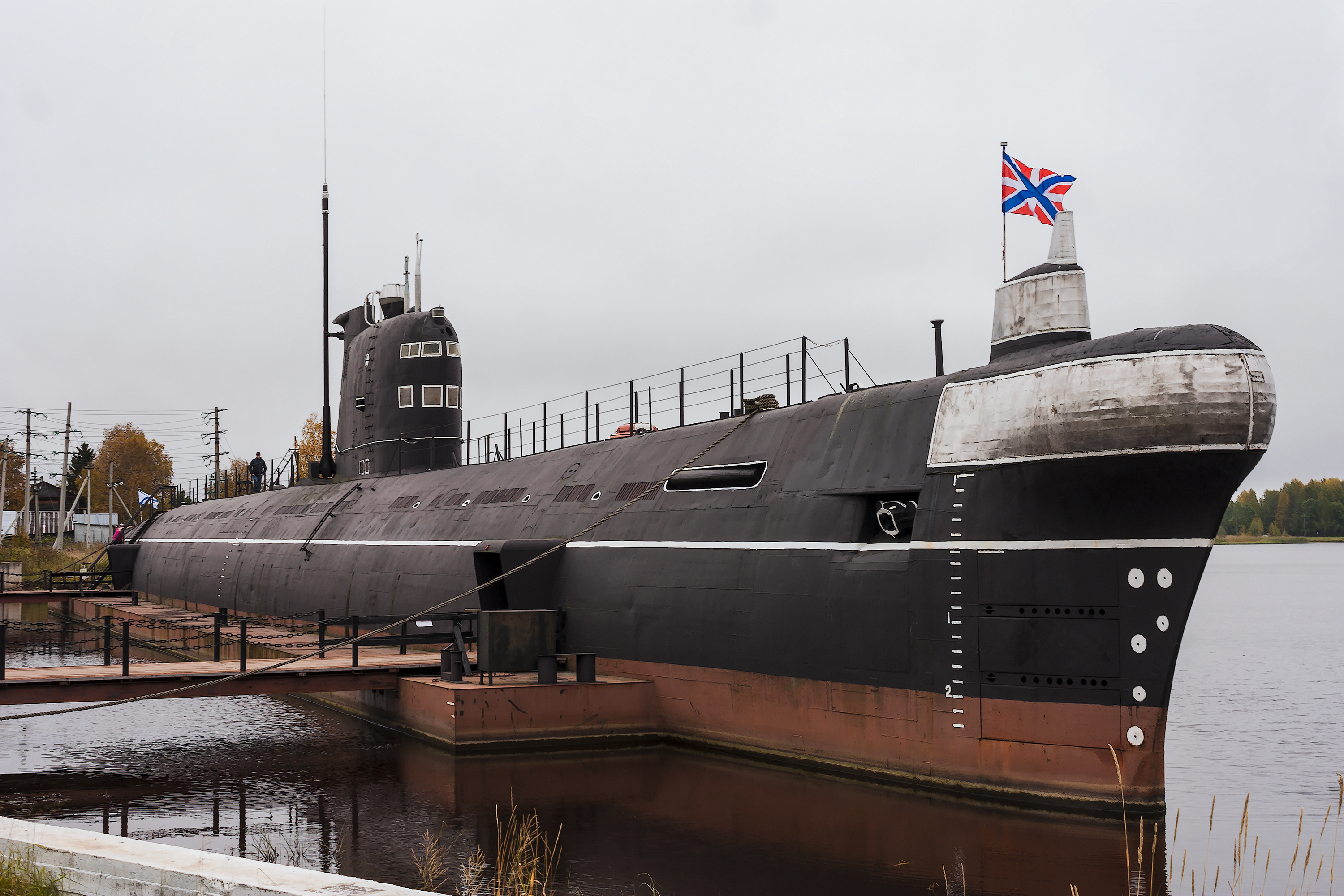
The Foxtrot-class submarine B-440, now a museum ship in Petrov's former hometown of Vytegra, has a display detailing Petrov's life and service

In retirement Petrov worked for ten years as dean of the faculty of the Institute of Economics and Law, while also serving as president of the International Maritime Youth League. He remained active in academic circles and research, authoring more than 100 scientific and journalistic articles, as well as the textbook "Protecting a Population in Emergency Situations". A member of the Communist Party since January 1954, Petrov remained active in the Moscow city branch of the Communist Party. Over his career he had received various honours and awards, including the Order of the Red Star, the Order "For Service to the Homeland in the Armed Forces of the USSR" 3rd class, and various medals, as well as the Hungarian medal "For Military Cooperation", 1st class.

Rear-Admiral Igor Petrov died on 14 April 2020, at the age of 86. The Foxtrot-class submarine B-440 is preserved as a museum ship in Petrov's former hometown of Vytegra, and includes a display on his life and service. Petrov had assisted in the transfer and establishment of the submarine to Vytegra.
