= Admiralty Board (Russian Empire) =

Naval forces administration body

The ship on the Admiralty spire, the emblem of Saint Petersburg.

Board of Admiralties (Russian: Адмиралтейств-коллегия, Admiralteystv-kollegiya) was a supreme body for the administration of the Imperial Russian Navy and admiralty shipyards in the Russian Empire, established by Peter the Great on December 12, 1718, and headquartered in the Admiralty building, Saint Petersburg. It included several other admiralties of the Imperial Russia among which is the Nikolaev Admiralty.

== History ==
The responsibilities of the Admiralty Board had been changing throughout its history. It supervised the construction of military ships, ports, harbors, and canals and administered Admiralty Shipyard. The Admiralty Board was also in charge of naval armaments and equipment, preparation of naval officers etc. The first president of the Admiralty Board was Count Fyodor Apraksin. In 1720, the Admiralty Board published a collection of naval decrees called Книга - устав морской о всем, что касается доброму управлению в бытность флота в море (A Naval Charter On Everything That Has To Do With Good Management Of A Fleet At Sea), authored by Peter the Great himself among other people. In 1777 the Admiralty Board founded the Russian Hydrographic Service, implementing a plan that marked the beginning of systematic drawing of nautical charts.

In 1802, the Board of Admiralties became a part of the Ministry of the Navy. Along with the Admiralty Board, there was also the Admiralty Department in 1805–1827 with the responsibilities of the Chief Office of the Ministry. In 1827, the Admiralty Board was turned into the Admiralty Council (Адмиралтейств-совет), which would exist until the October Revolution of 1917.

In new Russia (Russian Federation) the historic Admiralty Board has been reborn as the Maritime Board (Morskaya Kollegiya) having broad functions to coordinate Russia's maritime future.

== List of the Imperial Russian admiralties ==
- Main (Saint-Petersburg) Admiralty (1704–1908), turned to Admiralty Shipyards
- Okhta (Saint-Petersburg) Admiralty (1803–1896), turned to the Joint Stock Society B.Kreinton and Co., later Petrozavod
- Voronezh Admiralty (1696–1711)
  - Tavrov Admiralty (1705–1769)
  - Stupino Shipyard (1697–1700)
- Arkhangel Gorod Admiralty
- Astrakhan Admiralty (1722–1867), moved to Baku
- Irkutsk Admiralty (1803–1839)
- Kazan Admiralty (1718–1830)
  - Nizhniy Novgorod Shipyard (1722–1830)
- Kronstadt Admiralty (planned transfer of the Main Admiralty to Kronstadt)
- Nikolaev Admiralty (1788–1911), turned to the Russian Shipbuilding Joint Stock Society, later Mykolayiv Shipyard
- Kherson Admiralty (1778–1829), merged to Nikolaev Admiralty

== See also ==
- Admiralty building, Saint Petersburg
- Admiralty Shipyard
- List of Russian Admirals
- Peter von Sivers
- Russian Hydrographic Service
