= Pavel Novitsky (admiral) =

Russian admiral (1857–1917)

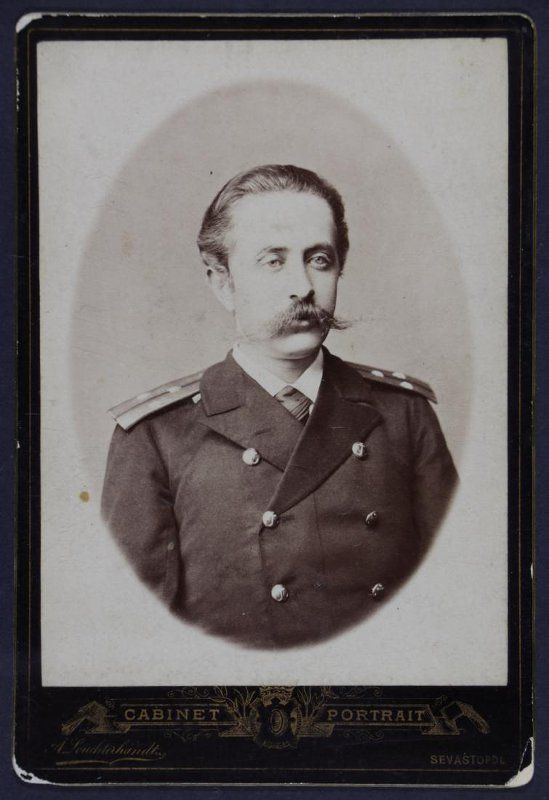
Pavel Novitsky

Pavel Ivanovich Novitsky (Russian: Па́вел Ива́нович Нови́цкий) (June 23, 1857 – December 15, 1917, Malakhov Mound, Crimea) was a Vice Admiral (April 14, 1913) of the Russian Empire.

Since July 21, 1916 he was Chief Commander of Sevastopol port. After the February Revolution he was removed from the post. He and his wife had 4 children; Vera, Maria, Boris, and George. When the Bolsheviks took power, he stayed in Sevastopol, was arrested and executed at Malakhov Kurgan together with a large group of other Navy officers. Boris went on to a successful career in the Soviet navy, while George left Russia prior to the February Revolution and settled in the United States, to be followed by Maria after the Second World War. Vera settled in France.
