= Anatoli Yakushev =

Russian footballer

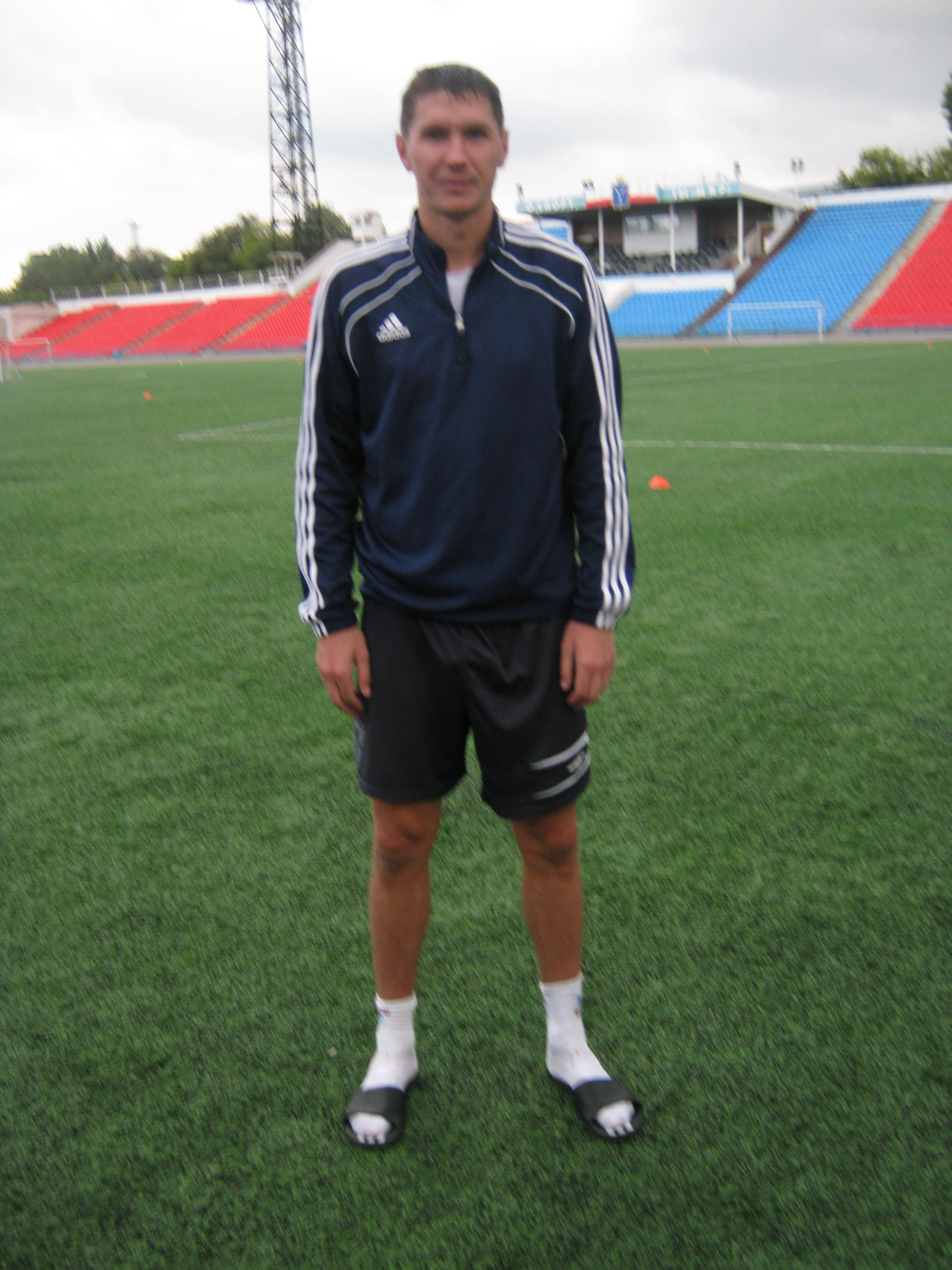

Personal information
- Full name: Anatoli Nikolayevich Yakushev
- Date of birth: 9 August 1980 (age 46)
- Place of birth: Lukhovitsy, Russian SFSR
- Height: 1.90 m (6 ft 3 in)
- Positions: Midfielder; defender

Senior career*
Years	Team	Apps	(Gls)
2000	FK Žalgiris Vilnius	8	(2)
2001	FC Oazis Yartsevo	30	(1)
2002	FC Dynamo-SPb St. Petersburg	9	(0)
2002–2003	Mika FC	28	(1)
2004–2008	FC Lukhovitsy	140	(9)
2009–2014	FC Lokomotiv Liski	137	(22)
2015	FC Kolomna	10	(0)
- * Club domestic league appearances and goals

Anatoli Nikolayevich Yakushev (Russian: Анатолий Николаевич Якушев; born 9 August 1980) is a former Russian professional footballer.

== Club career ==
He played in the Russian Football National League for FC Dynamo-SPb St. Petersburg in 2002.

== Honours ==
- Lithuanian A Lyga runner-up: 2000.
