= Vladimir Maslyuk =

Retired Russian Navy rear admiral (born 1950)

Vladimir Solveyevich Maslyuk (Russian: Владимир Соловеевич Маслюк; born 5 July 1950) is a retired Rear admiral in the Russian Navy and a former chief of the Department of the Federal Service for Military-Technical Cooperation (1998 – 2005).

Maslyuk graduated from the Nakhimov Black Sea Higher Naval School in Sevastopol in 1973 and served in the Baltic Fleet. In 1983 he graduated from the A.A. Grechko Naval Academy and afterwards he graduated from Military Academy of the General Staff of the Armed Forces of Russia in 1996.

Since 1998, for several years Maslyuk worked in the field of military-technical cooperation.

From 2001 to 2008 Vladimir Maslyuk was Chief of the Department of the Federal Service for Military-Technical Cooperation.

In 2008, V. Maslyuk was retired and then appointed Chief of the Department of the External Relations at Irkut Corporation.

From 2010 to 2016 he was a Deputy Director General of JSC "Moscow Design Bureau "Compas". At the present time V. Maslyuk is a director general of the JSC "Moscow Design Bureau "Compas".

== Awards ==
Medal "For Battle Merit"
