= Peter von Sivers =

Peter von Sivers Пётр Иванович Сиверс
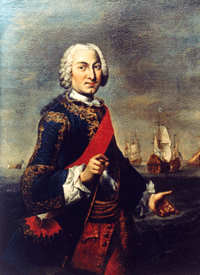
- Born: 1674; Stade, Duchy of Bremen, Holy Roman Empire
- Died: 1740 (aged 65–66); Saint Petersburg, Russian Empire
- Military career
- Allegiance: Russia
- Branch: Russian Navy
- Service years: 1704–1732
- Rank: Admiral
- Commands: Falk (1705-1706); Kronshlot (1707-1709); Victoria (1713); Leferm (1714-1715); St. Catherine (1716); Moscow (1717-1718); Russian Admiralty (1727-1732)
- Awards: Order of Saint Alexander Nevsky

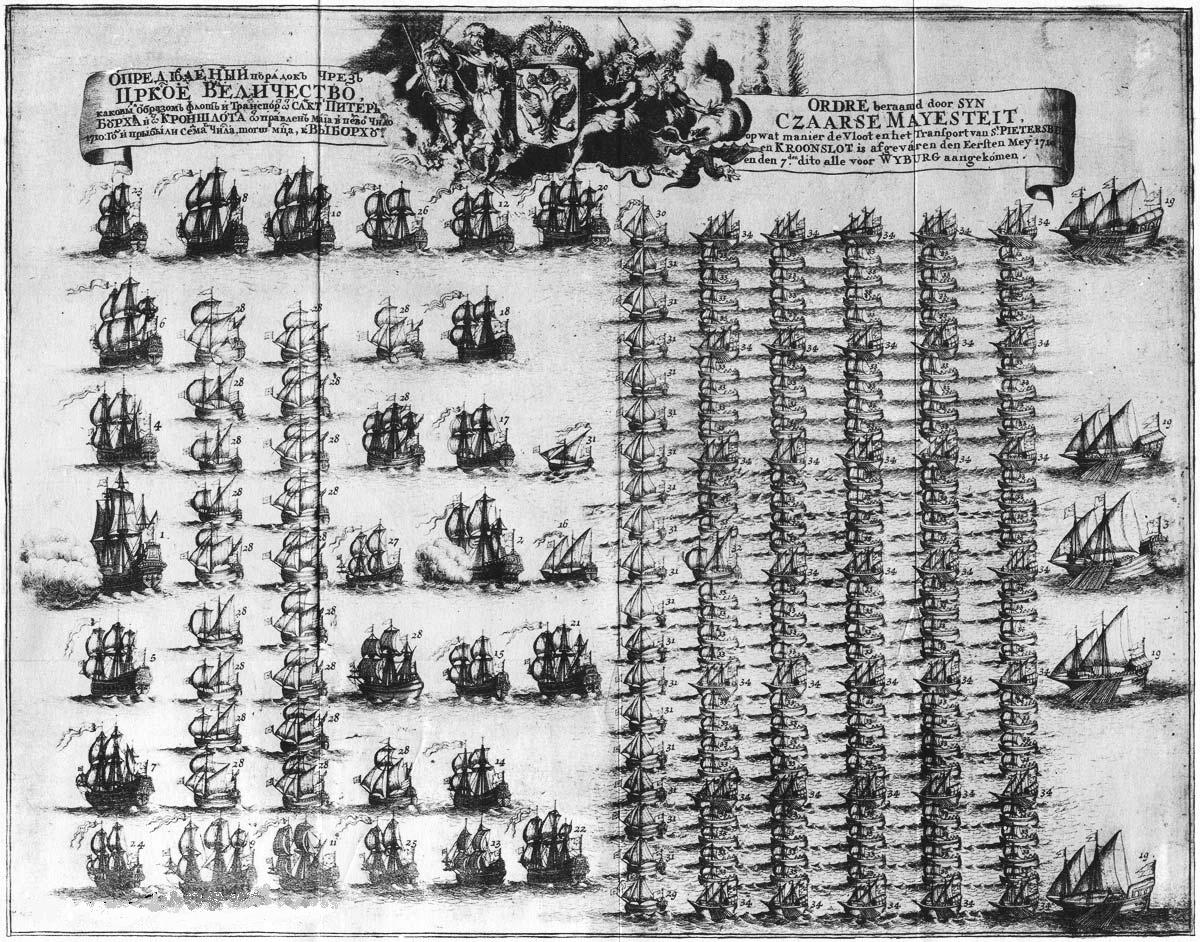
Peter the Great's Baltic Fleet in 1710.

Peter von Sivers (Russian: Пётр Иванович Сиверс, Pyotr Ivanovich Sivers; 1674 – 1740), more commonly known falsely as Peter von Sievers, was a German Admiral of the Imperial Russian Navy.

== Career ==
Sivers belonged to the Sivers family (de), originated from Fehmarm. His family moved to Copenhagen, where his father entered the Danish Navy as a captain, shortly after his birth. in 1688 Sivers joined the Danish Navy too and by 1703 he was promoted to the rank of lieutenant. The following year he joined the Russian Navy with the rank of captain in order to assist in the building and modernization of the Russian fleet spearheaded by Emperor Peter the Great. He was made part of the Estonian nobility in 1716.

Von Sivers became the vice-president of the Russian Admiralty Board in 1727 and its president, with the rank of admiral, between 1728 and 1732. In 1732 Sivers fell from grace as a result of a plot led by hostile parties. He was unfairly removed from office and exiled to his Ekekäll country estate near Khiytola (Estonian: Hiitola), in the former Vyborg Governorate of Karelia —present-day Priozersky District, that had been granted to him for his services. After almost eight years in exile, he was allowed to come to St. Petersburg for treatment on 9 January 1740 where he died in December the same year.

== Ships under his command ==
All these ships belonged to the Baltic Fleet:

- 14-gun snow "Falk" (1705–1706)
- 24-gun frigate "Kronshlot" (1707–1709)
- 50-gun battleship Victoria (1713)
- 70-gun battleship Leferm (1714–1715)
- 60-gun battleship St. Catherine (1716)
- 64-gun battleship Moscow (1717–1718)

== See also ==
- Admiralty Board (Russian Empire)
- Imperial Russian Navy
- List of Russian admirals
