= Vladimir Yakushev (admiral) =

Russian naval officer

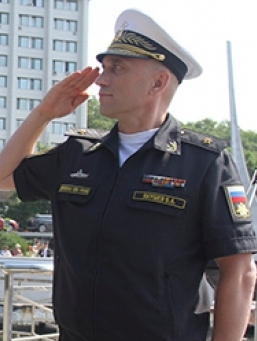
- Native name: Владимир Анатольевич Якушев
- Born: 22 April 1970 (age 56); Lviv, Ukrainian SSR, USSR
- Allegiance: Soviet Union; Russia
- Branch: Soviet Navy; Russian Navy
- Service years: 1988–present
- Rank: Rear-Admiral
- Commands: Pyotr Velikiy; 2nd Anti-Submarine Ship Division; Primorsky Flotilla
- Awards: Order of Military Merit; Order of Naval Merit; Medal of the Order "For Merit to the Fatherland" Second Class

Vladimir Anatolyevich Yakushev (Russian: Владимир Анатольевич Якушев; born 22 April 1970) is an officer of the Russian Navy. He currently holds the rank of rear-admiral, and was the commander of the Primorsky Flotilla of the Pacific Fleet from 2019 to 2020.

== Career ==
Yakushev was born on 22 April 1970 in Lviv, then part of the Ukrainian Soviet Socialist Republic, in the Soviet Union. He enrolled in the M. V. Frunze Higher Naval School in 1988, and graduated in 1992. His first posting was to the Northern Fleet, where he served aboard the Sovremenny-class destroyer Okrylyonnyy as commander of the missile warhead department. He underwent further studies at the N. G. Kuznetsov Naval Academy between 2004 and 2005. His next posting after his graduation was the command of the nuclear battlecruiser Pyotr Velikiy between 2005 and 2008. After this, still with the Northern Fleet, he served as chief of staff of the 43rd missile ship division, and as commander of the 2nd Anti-Submarine Ship Division.

Yakushev transferred to the Pacific Fleet in 2014, serving as chief of staff and first deputy commander of the Primorsky Flotilla. He was promoted to rear-admiral on 22 February 2017 and studied at the Military Academy of the General Staff of the Armed Forces of Russia between 2017 and 2019. After graduating he was appointed commander of the Primorsky Flotilla by Presidential Decree, and on 15 July 2019 was introduced to his new command by the Pacific Fleet commander Admiral Sergei Avakyants.

Over the course of his career Yakushev has been awarded the Order of Military Merit, as well as various departmental medals. He is married and has a daughter.

Military offices
Preceded by Sergey Zhuga	Commander of the Primorsky Flotilla; 2019–2020	Succeeded by Konstantin Kabantsov
