= Igor Mukhametshin =

Russian naval officer (born 1963)

Igor Timerbulatovich Mukhametshin
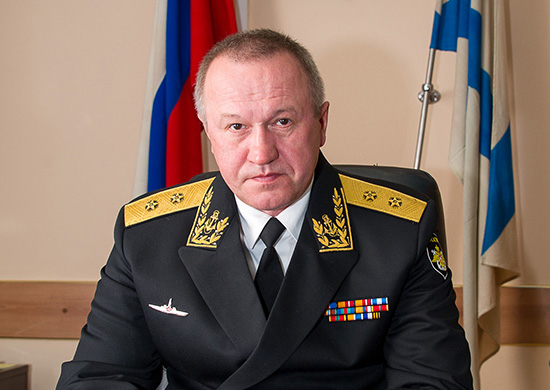
- Born: 15 August 1963 (age 63); Neftekamsk, Bashkir Autonomous Soviet Socialist Republic, USSR
- Allegiance: USSR; Russia
- Branch: Soviet Navy; Russian Navy
- Service years: 1981–present
- Rank: Vice-Admiral

Igor Timerbulatovich Mukhametshin (Russian: Игорь Тимербулатович Мухаметшин; born 15 August 1963) is an officer of the Russian Navy. He holds the rank of vice-admiral, and is a deputy Commander-in-Chief of the Russian Navy.

Born in the former Bashkir Autonomous Soviet Socialist Republic, Mukhametshin studied at the Pacific Higher Naval School, and began his service as a submarine officer with the Northern Fleet. He rose through the ranks, carrying out further studies at the navy's higher educational institutions, and was eventually in command of his own submarine. With his promotion to flag rank, he served in a number of staff positions, commanding submarine forces in both the Northern and Pacific Fleets. In 2016 he was appointed Chief of Staff and First Deputy Commander of the Baltic Fleet. While in this position he received media attention over his comments surrounding a vote on the naming of Khrabrovo Airport. Nevertheless, in 2019 he was appointed deputy Commander-in-Chief of the Russian Navy for armaments.

== Early career ==
Mukhametshin was born on 15 August 1963 in Neftekamsk, then part of the Bashkir Autonomous Soviet Socialist Republic of the Soviet Union. He attended the Pacific Higher Naval School, graduating in 1986, and began service as an officer with the Northern Fleet. He was initially a sonar engineer aboard a submarine, rising through the ranks to sonar commander and then senior assistant commander of a submarine. He completed the Higher Special Officer Classes of the Navy in 1994 and that year was appointed senior assistant to the commander of one of the Northern Fleet's nuclear submarine cruisers. Mukhametshin later took command of a nuclear submarine cruiser.

== Flag rank and staff offices ==
After completing studies at the N. G. Kuznetsov Naval Academy in 2001 Mukhametshin was appointed Deputy Commander of the Northern Fleet Submarine Combination, leaving in 2004 to take the higher courses at the Military Academy of the General Staff of the Armed Forces of Russia. He graduated in 2006 and was appointed commander of the Northern Fleet's submarine formations. In 2008 he became chief of staff and first deputy commander of one of the Northern Fleet's submarine squadrons, before being assigned to the Pacific Fleet, where he became commander of a submarine division. Mukhametshin was appointed commander of the Northern Fleet's submarine forces in 2010, and on 4 April 2012 he was appointed deputy chief of the Navy's Military Training and Scientific Centre. In 2013 he became commander of the Pacific Fleet's submarine forces. In July 2016 he was appointed Acting Chief of Staff and First Deputy Commander of the Baltic Fleet, being confirmed in the post on 7 October 2016.

=== Airport naming ===
In 2018 Mukhametshin referred to philosopher Immanuel Kant as a "traitor", during a public vote for the naming of Khrabrovo Airport. He addressed a gathering of Baltic Fleet sailors stating that Kant had "betrayed his homeland ... humbled himself and crawled on his knees to be given a chair at the university [and had written] some obscure books that none of those standing here have read and will never read." He instead urged his subordinates to vote for the airport to bear the name of Marshal Aleksandr Vasilevsky. He stated that "It's worthless for the airport of the region and city where the blood of Soviet soldiers and officers was pouring to bear the name of a stranger." The airport was subsequently named after Empress Elizabeth Petrovna, who received 34% of the vote. The fourth option had been another Soviet military figure, Ivan Chernyakhovsky.

On 1 March 2019 Mukhametshin was appointed deputy Commander-in-Chief of the Russian Navy for armaments. On 28 March 2019 he was present at the launching of the new Project 636 Varshavyanka-class submarine Petropavlovsk-Kamchatsky from the Admiralty Shipyard in Saint Petersburg.
