= Lists of Heroes of the Soviet Union =

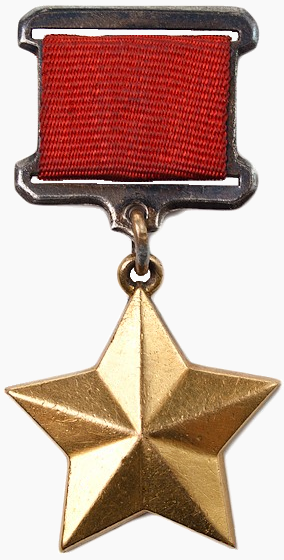
Red Star medal for Hero of the Soviet Union

Lists of Heroes of the Soviet Union cover people or groups of people who were given the Hero of the Soviet Union award, the highest distinction in the Soviet Union, for heroic feats in service to the Soviet state and society. The lists are organized alphabetically, by nationality or ethnicity, and by other criteria.

== Alphabetical ==
- List of Heroes of the Soviet Union (A)
- List of Heroes of the Soviet Union (B)
- List of Heroes of the Soviet Union (C)
- List of Heroes of the Soviet Union (D)
- List of Heroes of the Soviet Union (F)
- List of Heroes of the Soviet Union (G)
- List of Heroes of the Soviet Union (H)
- List of Heroes of the Soviet Union (I)
- List of Heroes of the Soviet Union (K)
- List of Heroes of the Soviet Union (L)
- List of Heroes of the Soviet Union (M)
- List of Heroes of the Soviet Union (N)
- List of Heroes of the Soviet Union (O)
- List of Heroes of the Soviet Union (P)
- List of Heroes of the Soviet Union (R)
- List of Heroes of the Soviet Union (S)
- List of Heroes of the Soviet Union (T)
- List of Heroes of the Soviet Union (U)
- List of Heroes of the Soviet Union (V)
- List of Heroes of the Soviet Union (Y)
- List of Heroes of the Soviet Union (Z)

== Nationality / Ethnicity ==
- List of Armenian Heroes of the Soviet Union
- List of Azerbaijani Heroes of the Soviet Union
- List of Bashkir Heroes of the Soviet Union
- List of Baltic Heroes of the Soviet Union
- List of North Caucasian Heroes of the Soviet Union
- List of Georgian Heroes of the Soviet Union
- List of Jewish Heroes of the Soviet Union
- List of Kazakh Heroes of the Soviet Union
- List of Kyrgyz Heroes of the Soviet Union
- List of Moldovan Heroes of the Soviet Union
- List of Tajik Heroes of the Soviet Union
- List of Uzbek Heroes of the Soviet Union
- List of foreign Heroes of the Soviet Union

== Other ==
- List of twice Heroes of the Soviet Union
- List of Hero of the Soviet Union forfeitures
- List of female Heroes of the Soviet Union
