= List of North Caucasian Heroes of the Soviet Union =

This article is a list of Heroes of the Soviet Union of North Caucasian origin.

== Assyrian ==
- Lado Davydov
- Sergey Sarkhoshev

== Avar ==
- Kadi Abakarov
- Magomed-Zagid Abdulmanapov
- Ahmed Abdulmedzhidov
- Yusup Akaev
- Said Aliev
- Magomet Gadzhiev
- Magomed Gamzatov
- Saadul Musaev

== Balkar ==
- Alim Baisultanov
- Mukhazhir Ummayev ru

== Circassian (Adyghe) ==
- Aleksey Askarov ru (Aскэр Алексей икъуэ Алексей)
- Murat Kardanov ru (Къардэн ӏэсхьэд ыкъуэ Мурат)
- Umar Habekov ru (Хьабэч Хьэмыд ыкъуэ Умэр)
- Husen Andrukhaev ru (Андырхъуай Борэжъ ыкъо Хьусен)
- Aidamir Achmizov ru (Ацумыжъу Ахьмэт ыкъо Айдэмыр)
- Kamchari Bzhigakov ru (Бжыхьакъу Барэкъу ыкъо Къамчэрый)
- Ali Koshev ru (Къощ Юусыф ыкъо Алий)
- Daut Nekhai ru (Нэхай Ерэджыб ыкъо Даут)
- Ismail Tkhagushev ru (Тхьагъушъ Хьэлалэ ыкъо Исмахьил)
- Abubachir Chuts ru (ШІуцІэ Батырбый ыкъо Абубэчыр)
- Zamakhshyarin Kunizhev (Къуныжъ Уэсмэн ыкъуэ Зэмахьшэри; Belonged to a Circassified family of Abazin origin)

== Chechen ==
- Irbaykhan Baybulatov
- Abukhadzhi Idrisov
- Khanpasha Nuradilov
- Khavazi Muhamed-Mirzaev
- Movlid Visaitov

== Ingush ==
- Ruslan Aushev

== Dargin ==
- Zulnukar Abdurakhmanov ru
- Sultan Alisultanov ru
- Sumen Kurbanov ru

== Kalmyk ==
- Erentsen Badmayev ru
- Bator Basanov ru
- Basan Gorodovikov ru
- Oka Gorodovikov
- Erdin Delikov ru
- Lidzhi Mandzhiyev ru
- Valery Ochirov ru
- Nikolai Sandzhirov ru
- Mikhail Selgikov ru
- Bimbel Khecheyev ru

== Karachay ==
- Kharun Bogatyryov
- Osman Kasayev
- Khalmurze Kumukov

== Kumykh ==
- Abdurakhman Abdulaev
- Elmurza Jumagulov
- Isa Sultanov

== Lak ==
- Gaszhi Buganov
- Tsakhai Makaev
- Musa Manarov
- Rizvan Suleymanov
- Yakov Suleymanov

== Lezgin ==
- Aleksandr Aliev
- Gasret Aliev
- Mirza Valiyev
- Abas Israfilov
- Esed Salikhov
- Valentin Emirov

== Meskhetian Turk ==
- Bedir Muradov

== Tsakhur ==
- Timofey Prokofiev
