= Kharun =

Kharun may refer to

- A fictional country in the second season of Borgen
- Kharun Rah
- Kharun River, India
- Seven Towers of Kharun
- Kharun Bogatyrev (1907–1966), Soviet military commander
- Ilya Kharun (born 2005), Canadian swimmer
