= List of Heroes of the Soviet Union (L) =

The Hero of the Soviet Union was the highest distinction of the Soviet Union. It was awarded 12,775 times. Due to the large size of the list, it has been broken up into multiple pages.

- Iosif Laar (ru)
- Stepan Labuzhsky (ru)
- Pavel Labuz (ru)
- Konstantin Labutin (ru)
- Aleksandr Laveykin
- Ivan Laveykin
- Nikolai Lavitsky (ru)
- Aleksandr Lavrenov (ru)
- Pavel Lavrentev (ru)
- Leonid Lavrenyuk (ru)
- Ivan Lavrik (ru)
- Dmitry Lavrinenko
- Vladimir Lavrinenkov (twice)
- Vladimir Lavrinovich (ru)
- Eduard Lavrinovich (ru)
- Vasily Lavrishchev (ru)
- Viktor Lavrov (ru)
- Pyotr Lavrov (ru)
- Yakov Lavrov (ru)
- Ivan Lavronenko (ru)
- Nikolai Lagunov (ru)
- Ivan Lagutenko (ru)
- Anisim Lagutin (ru)
- Vasily Lagutin (ru)
- Mikhail Lagutin (ru)
- Ivan Ladutko (ru)
- Ivan Ladushkin (ru)
- Arkhip Lazarev (ru)
- Vasily Grigorievich Lazarev
- Vasily Romanovich Lazarev (ru)
- Georgy Lazarev (ru)
- Dmitry Lazarev (ru)
- Yevgeny Kumzich Lazarev (ru)
- Yegor Lazarev (ru)
- Ivan Aleksandrovich Lazarev (ru)
- Ivan Romanovich Lazarev (ru)
- Nikolai Lazarev (ru)
- Sergey Lazarev (ru)
- Fyodor Lazarev (ru)
- Vasily Lazarenko (ru)
- Ivan Lazarenko
- Aleksandr Lazenko (ru)
- Dmitry Lazuka (ru)
- Nikolai Lazkov (ru)
- Vladimir Lakatosh (ru)
- Ivan Lakeyev (ru)
- Panteley Laktionov (ru)
- Pyotr Laktionov (ru)
- Anatoly Lamekhov (ru)
- Fyodor Lamzin (ru)
- Ivan Landik (ru)
- Ivan Lansyshev (ru)
- Mark Lanovenko (ru)
- Timofei Lanskikh (ru)
- Nikolai Lapata (ru)
- Ivan Lapenkov (ru)
- Nikolai Laperdin (ru)
- Aleksey Lapik (ru)
- Aleksandr Lapin (ru)
- Ivan Vasilyevich Lapin (ru)
- Ivan Georgievich Lapin (ru)
- Roman Lapin (ru)
- Anatoly Laps (ru)
- Viktor Laptev (ru)
- Vsevolod Laptev (ru)
- Grigory Laptev (ru)
- Konstantin Laptev (ru)
- Leonid Laptev (ru)
- Mikhail Laptev (ru)
- Pavel Laptev (ru)
- Sergey Petrovich Laptev (ru)
- Sergey Yakovlevich Laptev (ru)
- Anatoly Lapushkin (ru)
- Iosif Lapushkin (ru)
- Filipp Lapushkin (ru)
- Anatoly Lapshyov (ru)
- Anatoly Lapshyov (ru)
- Semyon Lapshenkov (ru)
- Aleksey Lapshin (ru)
- Vasily Lapshin (ru)
- Ilya Lapshin (ru)
- Pavel Ivanovich Lapshin (ru)
- Afanasy Lapshov (ru)
- Ivan Lapshov (ru)
- Nikolai Lapshov (ru)
- Ivan Laryov (ru)
- Yegor Larikov (ru)
- Andrey Larin (ru)
- Ivan Yakovlevich Larin (ru)
- Mikhail Nikanorovich Larin (ru)
- Mikhail Fyodorovich Larin (ru)
- Nikolai Larin (ru)
- Aleksey Larinov (ru)
- Boris Larionov (ru)
- Vasily Larionov (ru)
- Georgy Larionov (ru)
- Grigory Larionov (ru)
- Semyon Larionov (ru)
- Ivan Larkin (ru)
- Mikhail Larchenko (ru)
- Yevgeny Laryushin (ru)
- Nikolai Laskunov (ru)
- Maksim Lastovsky (ru)
- Nikolai Latkin (ru)
- Semyon Latukhin (ru)
- Gabdrakhman Latypov (ru)
- Kuddus Latypov (ru)
- Vladimir Aleksandrovich Latyshev (ru)
- Vladimir Fyodorovich Latyshev (ru)
- Aleksandr Laukhin (ru)
- Grigory Lakhin (ru)
- Ivan Lakhin (ru)
- Veniamin Lakhonin (ru)
- Fyodor Lakhtikov (ru)
- Boris Lakhtin (ru)
- Nikolai Latskov (ru)
- Georgy Lashin (ru)
- Mikhail Lashin (ru)
- Gavriil Lashkov (ru)
- Pyotr Lashchenko (ru)
- Aleksandr Pavlovich Lebedev (ru)
- Aleksandr Fyodorovich Lebedev (ru)
- Aleksey Ivanovich Lebedev (1920—1995) (ru)
- Aleksey Ivanovich Lebedev (1921—1943) (ru)
- Aleksey Fyodorovich Lebedev (ru)
- Anatoly Lebedev (ru)
- Boris Lebedev (ru)
- Valentin Lebedev (twice)
- Vasily Lebedev (ru)
- Viktor Aleksandrovich Lebedev (ru)
- Viktor Mikhailovich Lebedev (ru)
- Gennady Sergeyevich Lebedev (ru)
- Gennady Stepanovich Lebedev (ru)
- Dmitry Ilyich Lebedev (ru)
- Dmitry Maksimovich Lebedev (ru)
- Ivan Lebedev (ru)
- Konstantin Ivanovich Lebedev (ru)
- Konstantin Konstantinovich Lebedev (ru)
- Mikhail Vasilyevich Lebedev (ru)
- Nikolai Aleksandrovich Lebedev (ru)
- Nikolai Serveryanovich Lebedev (ru)
- Semyon Lebedev (ru)
- Fyodor Lebedev (ru)
- Ivan Lebedenko (ru)
- Nikita Lebedenko
- Grigory Lebed (ru)
- Boris Lev (ru)
- Rafail Lev (ru)
- Vladimir Levakov (ru)
- Sigizmund Levanevsky
- Konstantin Levashov (ru)
- Yegor Levenets (ru)
- Aleksandr Lyovin (ru)
- Aleksandr Fyodorovich Levin (ru)
- Vasily Levin (ru)
- Vasily Levin (ru)
- Grigory Levin
- Grigory Lyovin (ru)
- Dmitry Levin (ru)
- Mikhail Vasilyevich Levin (ru)
- Semyon Levin (ru)
- Vladimir Levitan (ru)
- Vasily Levitsky (ru)
- David Levitsky (ru)
- Roman Levitsky (ru)
- Timofei Levitsky (ru)
- Nikanor Lyovkin (ru)
- Vayk Levonyan (ru)
- Andrey Lyovochkin (ru)
- Vasily Lyovushkin (ru)
- Aleksandr Levchenko (ru)
- Anatoly Nikolayevich Levchenko
- Anatoly Semyonovich Levchenko
- Vasily Galakinovich Levchenko (ru)
- Vasily Sidorovich Levchenko (ru)
- Grigory Levchenko (ru)
- Dorofey Levchenko (ru)
- Ivan Levchenko (ru)
- Irina Levchenko
- Semyon Levchuk (ru)
- Pavel Legezin (ru)
- Vasily Legostayev (ru)
- Ivan Ledakov (ru)
- Pyotr Ledenyov (ru)
- Ivan Ledenyov (ru)
- Ivan Ledovsky (ru)
- Vakhtang Lezhava (ru)
- Aleksey Lezhenin (ru)
- Ivan Lezhov (ru)
- Veniamin Lezin (ru)
- Andrey Leykov (ru)
- Pavel Leytsis (ru)
- Filipp Lekarev (ru)
- Georgy Leladze (ru)
- Aleksandr Lelekov (ru)
- Dmitry Lelyushenko (twice)
- Ivan Lemaykin (ru)
- Georgy Lenyov (ru)
- Aleksandr Lyonkin (ru)
- Sergey Leonitsky (ru)
- Aleksey Leonov
- Viktor Nikolayevich Leonov (twice)
- Viktor Petrovich Leonov (ru)
- Demokrat Leonov
- Ivan Antonovich Leonov (ru)
- Ivan Dmitrievich Leonov (ru)
- Ivan Mikhailovich Leonov (ru)
- Mikhail Alekseyevich Leonov (ru)
- Mikhail Ivanovich Leonov (ru)
- Nikolai Vasilyevich Leonov (ru)
- Nikolai Ivanovich Leonov (ru)
- Ivan Leonovich (ru)
- Vasily Leontev (ru)
- Pyotr Leontev (ru)
- Anton Leontyuk (ru)
- Nikolai Leonchenko (ru)
- Nikolai Leonchikov (ru)
- Gavriil Lepyokhin (ru)
- Viktor Leselidze
- Konstantin Leselidze
- Ivan Lesik (ru)
- Nikolai Leskonozhenko (ru)
- Mitrofan Lesovoy (ru)
- Ilya Leta (ru)
- Aleksandr Letuchy (ru)
- Ivan Leusenko (ru)
- Nikanor Leukhin (ru)
- Nikolai Leutsky (ru)
- Dmitry Leushin (ru)
- Marsel Lefevr (ru)
- Ivan Leshanov (ru)
- Anatoly Leshchyov (ru)
- Vyacheslav Leshchenko (ru)
- Nikolai Leshchenko (ru)
- Pavel Leshchenko (ru)
- Pyotr Leshchenko (ru)
- Adam Leshchenko (ru)
- Mikhail Libman (ru)
- Viktor Liventsev (ru)
- Leonid Lizunov (ru)
- Aleksandr Lizyukov
- Pyotr Lizyukob (ru)
- Ivan Likunov (ru)
- Kumza Limansky (ru)
- Ilya Limonov (ru)
- Nikolai Limon (ru)
- Aleksandr Limorenko (ru)
- Mikhail Vasilyevich Linnik (ru)
- Mikhail Nikiforovich Linnik
- Pavel Linnik (ru)
- Aleksandr Linchuk (ru)
- Grigory Linkov (ru)
- Fyodor Lipatenkov (ru)
- Fyodr Lipatkin (ru)
- Aleksandr Lipatov (ru)
- Nikolai Lipatov (ru)
- Pyotr Lipachyov (ru)
- Aleksandr Lipilin (ru)
- German Lipkin (ru)
- Pyotr Lipovenko (ru)
- Aleksandr Lipunov (ru)
- Ivan Lipchansky (ru)
- Ivan Lisin (ru)
- Sergey Lisin (ru)
- Dmitry Lisitsyn (ru)
- Konstantin Lisitsyn (ru)
- Yuri Lisitsyn (ru)
- Anna Lisitsyna
- Nikolai Lisunov (ru)
- Sergey Litavrin (ru)
- Ivan Mironovich Litvin (ru)
- Ivan Timofeyevich Litvin (ru)
- Vasily Litvinenko (ru)
- Grigory Litvinenko (ru)
- Ivan Litvinenko (ru)
- Nikolai Litvinenko (ru)
- Pyotr Litvinenko (ru)
- Semyon Litvinenko (ru)
- Tikhon Litvinenko (ru)
- Trofim Litvinenko (ru)
- Vasily Litvinov (1922—1974) (ru)
- Vasily Litvinov (1923—2002) (ru)
- Vladimir Grigorievich Litvinov (ru)
- Vladimir Ivanovich Litvinov (ru)
- Dmitry Litvinov (ru)
- Ivan Litvinov (ru)
- Nikolai Litvinov (ru)
- Pavel Litvinov (ru)
- Pyotr Vasilyevich Litvinov (ru)
- Pyotr Dmitrievich Litvinov (ru)
- Prokofy Litvinov (ru)
- Fyodor Litvinov (ru)
- Larisa Litvinova
- Boris Litvinchuk (ru)
- Boris Litvinyuk (ru)
- Grigory Litvishchenko (ru)
- Lydia Litvyak
- Nikolai Litovchenko (ru)
- Stepan Litovchenko (ru)
- Vasily Likhachyov (ru)
- Viktor Likhachyov (ru)
- Ivan Likhachyov (ru)
- Pyotr Likhachyov (ru)
- Mark Likhobaba (ru)
- Ivan Likhobabin
- Mikhail Likhovid (ru)
- Semyon Likhovidov (ru)
- Ivan Likhoy (ru)
- Pyotr Likholetov (ru)
- Vladimir Likhotvorik (ru)
- Aleksandr Lichinko (ru)
- Grigory Lishakov (ru)
- Pyotr Lishafay (ru)
- Aleksandr Lobanov (ru)
- Andrey Lobanov (ru)
- Viktor Lobanov (ru)
- Yevgeny Aleksandrovich Lobanov (ru)
- Yevgeny Ivanovich Lobanov (ru)
- Ivan Lobanov (ru)
- Spartak Lobanov (ru)
- Stepan Lobanov (ru)
- Vladimir Lobanok (ru)
- Pyotr Lobas (ru)
- Mikhail Lobastev (ru)
- Arkady Lobachyov (ru)
- Nikolai Lobachyov (ru)
- Aleksey Lobov (ru)
- Georgy Lobov
- Yakov Lobov (ru)
- Timofei Loboda (ru)
- Ivan Lobodin (ru)
- Vasily Lobusov (ru)
- Savely Lobusov (ru)
- Nikolai Lobyrin (ru)
- Stepan Lovenetsky (ru)
- Viktor Lovchev (ru)
- Pyotr Logvin (ru)
- Filipp Logvin (ru)
- Aleksey Logvinenko (ru)
- Nikolai Logvinenko (ru)
- Aleksandr Loginov (ru)
- Aleksey Loginov (ru)
- Anatoly Loginov (ru)
- Arkady Loginov (ru)
- Vladimir Loginov (ru)
- Leonid Loginov (ru)
- Mikhail Loginov (ru)
- Sergey Loginov (ru)
- Aleksandr Logunov (ru)
- Andrey Lozhechnikov (ru)
- Konstantin Kozhkin (ru)
- Dmitry Loza
- Konstantin Lozanenko (ru)
- Ivan Lozenko (ru)
- Vasily Lozov (ru)
- Vasily Lozovsky (ru)
- Viktor Artemevich Lozovsky (ru)
- Viktor Izotovich Lozovsky (ru)
- Boris Lozorenko (ru)
- Aleksey Lozunenko (ru)
- Grigory Loiko (ru)
- Vladislav Loychikov (ru)
- Ivan Loktev (ru)
- Andrey Loktionov (ru)
- Afanasy Loktionov (ru)
- Aleksey Maksimovich Lomakin (ru)
- Aleksey Yakovlevich Lomakin (ru)
- Anatoly Lomakin (ru)
- Vasily Andreyevich Lomakin
- Vasily Ivanovich Lomakin (ru)
- Eduard Lomov (ru)
- Vladimir Longinov (ru)
- Aleksey Lopatin (ru)
- Anatoly Lopatin (ru)
- Anton Lopatin
- Boris Lopatin (ru)
- Georgy Lopatin (ru)
- Pyotr Lopatin (ru)
- Fyodor Lopatin (ru)
- Nikolai Lopach (ru)
- Mikhail Lorin (ru)
- Leonid Lorchenko (ru)
- Aleksey Losev (ru)
- Anatoly Losev (ru)
- Oleg Losik (ru)
- Ivan Loskutinkov (ru)
- Vasily Loskutov (ru)
- Viktor Loskutov (ru)
- Stepan Loskutov (ru)
- Aleksey Lokhanov (ru)
- Filipp Lokhmatov (ru)
- Ivan Loshak (ru)
- Afanasy Loshakov (ru)
- Aleksey Loshkov (ru)
- Ivan Lubyanetsky (ru)
- Ivan Lubyanoy (ru)
- Sergey Lugansky (twice)
- VasilyLugovoy (ru)
- Dmitry Lugovskoy (ru)
- Micheslav Lugovsky (ru)
- Nikolai Lugovskoy (ru)
- Nikolai Lugovtsev (ru)
- Ivan Luev (ru)
- Andrey Luzhetsky (ru)
- Fyodor Luzan (ru)
- Aleksey Luzgin (ru)
- Dmitry Lukanin (ru)
- Yakov Lukanin (ru)
- Aleksey Lukashevich (ru)
- Vasily Lukashin (ru)
- Nikolai Lukashov (ru)
- Afanasy Lukin (ru)
- Vasily Lukin (ru)
- Vladimir Lukin (ru)
- Mikhail Lukin (ru)
- Nikolai Lukinov (ru)
- Anton Lukyanenko (ru)
- Andrey Lukyanets (ru)
- Aleksandr Lulyanov (ru)
- Aleksey Lulyanov (ru)
- Anatoly Lulyanov (ru)
- Andrey Lukyanov (ru)
- Sergey Lukyanov (ru)
- Vasily Lukyantsev (ru)
- Leonid Lukyanchikov (ru)
- Grigory Lumov (ru)
- Pavel Lunev (ru)
- Nikolai Lunin
- Yakov Lunin (ru)
- Boris Lunts (ru)
- Nikolai Lunkov (ru)
- Dmitry Lupov (ru)
- Vladimir Luppov (ru)
- Yevgeny Luppov (ru)
- Ivan Lupyrev (ru)
- Vladimir Lursmanashvili (ru)
- Pyotr Lusta (ru)
- Mikhail Lusto (ru)
- Nikolai Lut (ru)
- Sulgi Lutfullin (ru)
- Ivan Luferenko (ru)
- Andrey Lutsevich (ru)
- Anufry Lutsenko (ru)
- Vasily Lutsenko (ru)
- Ignat Lutsenko (ru)
- Pyotr Lutsenko (ru)
- Vladimir Lutsky (ru)
- Mikhail Luchyok (ru)
- Alexander Luchinsky
- Pyotr Lushev
- Vladimir Lushin (ru)
- Aleksandr Lushnikov (ru)
- Grigory Lushchenko (ru)
- Nikolai Lyzenko (ru)
- Vasily Lyzin (ru)
- Vasily Lykov (ru)
- Ivan Lysanov (ru)
- Aleksandr Lysenko (ru)
- Boris Lysenko (ru)
- Yevgeny Lysenko (ru)
- Ivan Ivanovich Lysenko (ru)
- Ivan Iosifovich Lysenko (ru)
- Ivan Nikiforovich Lysenko (ru)
- Ivan Timofeyevich Lysenko (ru)
- Nikolai Yemelyanovich Lysenko (ru)
- Nikolai Kalistratovich Lysenko (ru)
- Fyodor Lysenko (ru)
- Aleksey Lysenkov (ru)
- Mikhail Lysov (ru)
- Pyotr Lytanov (ru)
- Dmitry Lykhin (ru)
- Sergey Lykhin (ru)
- Stepan Lychakov (ru)
- Zakhar Lyshenya (ru)
- Semyon Lvov (ru)
- Vasily Lyubavin (ru)
- Nikolai Lyubarsky (ru)
- Nikolai Lyubezny (ru)
- Mikhail Lyubimenko (ru)
- Aleksey Lyubimov (ru)
- Ivan Lyubimov (ru)
- Mikhail Lyubichev (ru)
- Mikhail Lyubov (ru)
- Ivan Lyubushkin (ru)
- Aleksandr Lyudvichenko (ru)
- Ivan Lyudnikov
- Pavlin Lyulin (ru)
- Sergey Lyulin (ru)
- Vladimir Lyusin (ru)
- Yevgeny Lyutikov (ru)
- Vladislav Lyutkevich (ru)
- Aleksandr Lyuty (ru)
- Grigory Lyuty (ru)
- Viktor Lyagin (ru)
- Anatoly Lyadenko (ru)
- Grigory Lyadov (ru)
- Ivan Lyadov (ru)
- Timofei Lyadsky (ru)
- Ivan Lyakin (ru)
- Boris Lyalin (ru)
- Vasily Lyalin (ru)
- Grigory Lyalko (ru)
- Stepan Lyamin (ru)
- Aleksandr Lyangasov (ru)
- Anatoly Lyapidevsky
- Anatoly Lyapkin (ru)
- Viktor Lyapolov (ru)
- Stepan Lyapota (ru)
- Boris Lyakh (ru)
- Daniil Lyakh (ru)
- Nikolai Lyakh (ru)
- Vladimir Lyakhov (twice)
- Georgy Lyakhov (ru)
- Login Lyakhov (ru)
- Yakov Lyakhov (ru)
- Ivan Lyashenko (ru)
- Nikolai Lyashchenko
