= List of Heroes of the Soviet Union (Y) =

The title Hero of the Soviet Union was the highest distinction of the Soviet Union. It was awarded 12,775 times. Due to the large size of the list, it has been broken up into multiple pages.

- Dmitry Yablochkin ru
- Ivan Yaborov ru
- Yevgeny Yavenkov ru
- Vladimir Yavrumov ru
- Mikhail Yaglinsky ru
- Kerim Yagudin ru
- Ivan Yazovskikh ru
- David Yazydzhan ru
- Urumbek Yakibov ru
- Anton Yakimenko ru
- Ivan Rodionovich Yakimenko ru
- Ivan Semyonovich Yakimenko ru
- Aleksey Yakimov ru
- Pavel Yakimov ru
- Nikolai Yakimovich ru
- Aleksandr Yakimchuk ru
- Aleksandr Yakovenko ru
- Vasily Yakovenko (1920) ru
- Ilya Yakovenko ru
- Leonty Yakovenko ru
- Vasily Yakovets ru
- Aleksandr Yakovitsky ru
- Aleksandr Alekseyevich Yakovlev ru
- Aleksandr Ivanovich Yakovlev ru
- Aleksandr Nikiforovich Yakovlev ru
- Aleksey Aleksandrovich Yakovlev ru
- Aleksey Vladimirovich Yakovlev ru
- Aleksey Trofimovich Yakovlev ru
- Vasily Vasilyevich Yakovlev ru
- Vasily Nesterovich Yakovlev ru
- Vasily Nikolaevich Yakovlev ru
- Vasily Fyodorovich Yakovlev ru
- Yevgeny Yakovlev ru
- Yevstafy Yakovlev ru
- Mikhail Ivanovich Yakovlev ru
- Mikhail Pavlovich Yakovlev ru
- Nikolai Aleksandrovich Yakovlev ru
- Nikolai Yakovlevich Yakovlev ru
- Pyotr Yakovlev ru
- Sergey Yakovlev ru
- Timofey Akimovich Yakovlev ru
- Timofey Alekseyevich Yakovlev ru
- Ivan Yakovchenko ru
- Vasily Yaksargin ru
- Anton Yakuba ru
- Ivan Yakubin ru
- Gulyam Yakubov ru
- Ilya Yakobov ru
- Kasym Yakobov ru
- Masim Yakobov
- Osman Yakubov ru
- Ivan Yakubovsky (twice)
- Izrail Yakubovsky ru
- Pyotr Yakubovsky ru
- Aleksandr Yakunenko ru
- Aleksey Yakunin ru
- Pyotr Yakunin ru
- Nazym Yakupov ru
- Nikolai Yakupov ru
- Ivan Yakurnov ru
- Anatoly Yakushev ru
- Boris Yakushev ru
- Ivan Yakushenko ru
- Goergy Yakushkin ru
- Ivan Yakushkin ru
- Ivan Yalovoy ru
- Fyodor Yalovoy ru
- Pavel Yalugin ru
- Shagy Yamaletdinov ru
- Grigory Yamushev ru
- Aleksandr Yamshchikov ru
- Andrey Yanalov ru
- Nikolai Yanevich ru
- Vasily Yanitsky ru
- Mikhail Yanko ru
- Nikolai Yankov ru
- Stepan Yankovsky ru
- Ivan Yankovsky ru
- Bulat Yantimirov ru
- Ivan Yanushkovsky ru
- Pyotr Yantsev ru
- Vyacheslav Yanchenko ru
- Yevgeny Yaryomenko ru
- Vasily Yaremchuk ru
- Dmitry Yaremchuk ru
- Genrikh Yarzhin ru
- Ivan Yarkin ru
- Sergey Yarmak ru
- Ivan Yarovikov ru
- Artemy Yarovoy ru
- Grigory Yarovoy ru
- Pyotr Yarovoy ru
- Fyodor Yarovoy ru
- Filipp Yarovoy ru
- Aleksandr Yaroslavtsev ru
- Sergey Yaroslavtsev ru
- Ivan Yarotsky ru
- Otakar Yarosh ru
- Vladimir Yartsev ru
- Pavel Yartsev ru
- Ivan Yasnov ru
- Nikolai Yastrevinsky ru
- Aleksandr Yastrebov ru
- Vasily Yastrebov ru
- Viktor Yastrebtsev ru
- Gennady Yakhnov ru
- Mikhail Yakhogoev ru
- Viktor Yatsenevich ru
- Nikolai Yatsenko ru
- Pavel Yatsenko ru
- Pyotr Yatsenko ru
- Serafim Yatsenkosky ru
- Ivan Yatsunenko ru
- Grigory Yachmenyov ru
- Sergey Yachnik ru
- Viktor Yashin ru
- Georgy Yashin ru
- Ivan Yashin ru
- Nikolai Yashin ru
- Aleksey Yashnev ru
- Ivan Yashchenko ru
- Nikolai Yashchenko ru
- Rostislav Yashchuk ru
- Vadim Yevgrafov ru
- Sadofy Yevgrafov ru
- Aleksandr Yevdokimov ru
- Aleksey Yevdokimov ru
- Viktor Yevdokimov ru
- Vladimir Yevdokimov ru
- Grigory Yevdokimov ru
- Vasily Yevdoshenko ru
- Grigory Yevishev ru
- Vasily Yevlanov ru
- Ivan Yevlashev ru
- Ivan Yevplov ru
- Ivan Yevsevev ru
- Aleksandr Yevseyev ru
- Gavril Yevseyev ru
- Yevgeny Yevseyev ru
- Nikolai Yevseyev ru
- Vladimir Yevseyenko ru
- Georgy Yevstafev ru
- Nikolai Yevstafev ru
- Nikolai Yevstakhov ru
- Aleksandr Dmitrievich Yevstigneyev ru
- Aleksandr Semyonovich Yevstigneyev ru
- Aleksey Yevstigneyev ru
- Ivan Yevstigneyev ru
- Kirill Yevstigneyev (twice)
- Nikolai Yevstratov ru
- Nikolai Andreyevich Yevsyukov ru
- Nikolai Pavlovich Yevsyukov ru
- Ivan Yevteyev ru
- Mikhail Yevteyev ru
- Aleksandr Yevtushenko ru
- Nikifor Yevtushenko ru
- Tatevos Yegiazaryan ru
- Nikolai Yegipko
- Aleksandr Ivanovich Yegorov ru
- Aleksandr Petrovich Yegorov ru
- Aleksey Aleksandrovich Yegorov ru
- Aleksey Grigorievich Yegorov ru
- Aleksey Mikhailovich Yegorov ru
- Aleksey Semyonovich Yegorov ru
- Boris Yegorov
- Vasily Vasilyevich Yegorov ru
- Vasily Martynovich Yegorov ru
- Vasily Mikhailovich Yegorov ru
- Veniamin Yegorov ru
- Vladimir Yegorov ru
- Gavril Yegorov ru
- Georgy Yegorov
- Ivan Yegorov ru
- Ivan Klavdievich Yegorov ru
- Ilya Yegorov ru
- Konstantin Yegorov ru
- Mikhail Alekseyevich Yegorov
- Mikhail Anisimovich Yegorov ru
- Mikhail Artyomovich Yegorov ru
- Mikhail Ivanovich Yegorov ru
- Nikolai Sergeyevich Yegorov ru
- Pavel Vasilyevich Yegorov ru
- Pavel Ivanovich Yegorov ru
- Pyotr Yegorov ru
- Sergey Andreyevich Yegorov ru
- Sergey Vladimirovich Yegorov ru
- Spiridon Yegorov ru
- Timofey Yegorov ru
- Anna Yegorova
- Vladimir Yegorovovich ru
- Vasily Yegubchenko ru
- Pyotr Yevelev ru
- Aleksandr Yedemsky ru
- Viktor Yedkin ru
- Mikhail Yedomin ru
- Ivan Yedunov ru
- Pyotr Yedunov ru
- Valentin Yezhkov ru
- Ivan Yezhkov ru
- Fyodor Yezhkov ru
- Yevgeny Yezhov ru
- Konstantin Yezhov ru
- Nikolai Gerasimovich Yezhov ru
- Nikolai Konstantinovich Yezhov ru
- Dmitry Yezersky ru
- Vasily Yekimov ru
- Grigory Yekimov ru
- Aleksandr Yelagin ru
- Sergey Yelagin ru
- Andrey Yelgin ru
- Anatoly Alekseyevich Yeldyshev ru
- Anatoly Petrovich Yeldyshev ru
- Stepan Yeleynikov ru
- Mikhail Yelesin ru
- Zhanbek Yeleusov ru
- Gavriil Yeletskikh ru
- Aleksey Yelizarov ru
- Viktor Yelizarov ru
- Sergey Yelizarov ru
- Aleksandr Yeliseyev ru
- Aleksey Yeliseyev (twice)
- Andrey Yeliseyev ru
- Gennady Yeliseyev ru
- Grigory Yeliseyev ru
- Mikhail Yeliseyev ru
- Nikolai Yeliseyev ru
- Fedot Yeliseyev ru
- Pavel Yelisov ru
- Sergey Yelistratov ru
- Agey Yelkin ru
- Valentin Yelkin ru
- Leonid Yelkin ru
- Ivan Yeltsov ru
- Vasily Yelyutin ru
- Eduard Yelyan ru
- Aleksey Yemanov ru
- Vladimir Yemelin ru
- Anatoly Yemelyanenko ru
- Vasily Yemelyanenko ru
- Boris Yemelyanov ru
- Vasily Yemelyanov ru
- Viktor Yemelyanov ru
- Gavriil Yemelyanov ru
- Georgy Yemelyanov ru
- Dmitry Yemelyanov ru
- Ivan Yemelyanov ru
- Ignat Yemelyanov ru
- Pyotr Yemelyanov ru
- Dmitry Yemlyutin ru
- Pyotr Yemtsov ru
- Boris Yenaliev ru
- Andrey Yenzhievsky ru
- Mikhail Yenshin
- Aleksandr Yepanchin ru
- Nikolai Yepimakhov ru
- Aleksey Yepishev
- Mikhail Yepushkin ru
- Ivan Yerashov ru
- Boris Yeremeyev ru
- Andrey Yeryomenko
- Ivan Anisimovich Yeryomenko ru
- Ivan Trofimovich Yeryomenko ru
- Aleksandr Klimentevich Yeryomin ru
- Aleksandr Semyonovich Yeryomin ru
- Aleksey Yeryomin ru
- Boris Dmitrievich Yeryomin ru
- Boris Nikolaevich Yeryomin ru
- Ivan Andreyevich Yeryomin ru
- Ivan Yegorovich Yeryomin ru
- Mikhail Yeryomin ru
- Vasily Yeryomushkin ru
- Nikolai Yeryomushkin ru
- Daniil Yeretik ru
- Nikolai Yereshchenko ru
- Fyodor Yerzikov ru
- Pavel Yerin ru
- Yevgeny Yerlykin ru
- Vladimir Yermak ru
- Pavel Yermak ru
- Aleksandr Yermakov ru
- Andrey Yermakov ru
- Afanasy Yermakov ru
- Vasily Yermakov ru
- Dmitry Yermakov ru
- Ivan Yermakov ru
- Frol Yermakov ru
- Viktor Yermeneyev ru
- Pavel Yermilov ru
- Kozma Yermishin ru
- Aleksandr Yermolaev ru
- Vasily Yermolaev ru
- Vladimir Alekseyevich Yermolaev ru
- Vladimir Ivanovich Yermolaev ru
- Grigory Yermolaev ru
- Ivan Alekseyevich Yermolaev ru
- Ivan Dmitrievich Yermolaev ru
- Nikolai Yermolaev ru
- Sergey Yermolaev ru
- Feogent Yermolaev ru
- Panteley Yermolenko ru
- Pyotr Yeromasov ru
- Viktor Yeronko ru
- Aleksey Yerofeyev ru
- Grigory Yerofeyev ru
- Yevgeny Yerofeyev ru
- Afrikant Yerofeyevsky ru
- Leonid Yerofeyevskikh ru
- Aleksandr Yerokhin ru
- Aleksey Yerokhin ru
- Mikhail Yerokhin ru
- Viktor Yeroshenko ru
- Aleksandr Yeroshin ru
- Andrey Yershkin ru
- Valentin Yershkin ru
- Aleksandr Yershov ru
- Aleksey Yershov ru
- Vasily Yershov ru
- Viktor Yegorovich Yershov ru
- Viktor Zakharovich Yershov ru
- Vladimir Yershov ru
- Pavel Vladimirovich Yershov ru
- Pavel Ivanovich Yershov ru
- Vasily Yeryshev ru
- Boris Yeryashev ru
- Vladimir Yesaulenko ru
- Nikolai Yesaulenko ru
- Vladimir Yesebua ru
- Nursutbai Yesebulatov ru
- Pyotr Yesipov ru
- Saptar Yestimesov ru
- Ivan Yestin ru
- Ivan Yeskov ru
- Mikhail Yefanov ru
- Grigory Yefimenko ru
- Ivan Yefimenko ru
- Aleksandr Yefimov (twice)
- Andrey Yefimov ru
- Vadim Yefimov ru
- Vasily Mefodevich Yefimov ru
- Vasily Trofimovich Yefimov ru
- Vyacheslav Yefimov ru
- Ivan Yefimov ru
- Konstantin Yefimov ru
- Leonid Yefimov ru
- Matevy Yefimov ru
- Miron Yefimov ru
- Pyotr Yefimov ru
- Sergey Yefimov ru
- Nikolai Yefimtsev ru
- Ivan Yefremenko ru
- Andrey Georgievich Yefremov ru
- Andrey Yakovlevich Yefremov ru
- Vasily Vasilyevich Yefremov ru
- Vasily Sergeyevich Yefremov (twice)
- Dmitry Yefremov ru
- Ivan Yefremov ru
- Mikhail Yefremov ru
- Pyotr Yefremov ru
- Fyodor Yefremov ru
- Vasily Yolkin ru
- Ivan Yolkin ru
- Vasily Yubkin ru
- Ivan Yugalov ru
- Girsh Yudashkin ru
- Aleksandr Vasilyevich Yudin ru
- Aleksandr Dmitrievich Yudin ru
- Aleksey Yudin ru
- Viktor Mikhail Yudin ru
- Viktor Stepanovich Yudin ru
- Vladimir Yudin ru
- Ivan Yudin ru
- Mikhail Yudin ru
- Nikolai Lukyanovich Yudin ru
- Nikolai Nikolaevich Yudin ru
- Pavel Yudin ru
- Sergey Yudin ru
- Vasily Yuzhakov ru
- Ivan Yuzhaninov ru
- Aleksandr Yuzhilin ru
- Yakov Yula ru
- Abdullaazis Yuldashev ru
- Fayzulla Yuldashev ru
- Aleksandr Yulev ru
- Andrey Yumashev
- Ivan Yumashev
- Aleksandr Yunev
- Ivan Yunin ru
- Nikolai Yunkerov ru
- Boris Yunosov ru
- Oleg Yurasov ru
- Aleksey Yurin ru
- Boris Yurin ru
- Boris Yurkin ru
- Ivan Yurkin ru
- Nikolai Yurkin ru
- Aleksandr Yurkov ru
- Dmitry Yurkov ru
- Ivan Yurkov ru
- Nikolai Yurkovsky ru
- Anton Yurchenko ru
- Yegor Yurchenko ru
- Mikhail Yurchenko ru
- Nikolai Yurchenko ru
- Panteley Yurchenko ru
- Pyotr Aksentevich Yurchenko ru
- Pyotr Fomich Yurchenko ru
- Fyodor Yurchenko ru
- Aleksey Yurev ru
- Ivan Yurev ru
- Leonid Yurev ru
- Mikhail Yurev ru
- Ismail Yusupov ru
- Iosif Yufa ru
- Nikolai Yuferov ru
- Ivan Yufimov ru
- Aleksey Yukhanov ru
- Pyotr Yukhvitov ru
- Viktor Yukhnin ru
- Arsenty Yukhnovets ru
- Nikolai Yukhotnikov ru
- Sergey Yushin ru
- Mikhail Yushkov ru
