= List of Heroes of the Soviet Union (I) =

The Hero of the Soviet Union was the highest distinction of the Soviet Union. It was awarded 12,775 times. Due to the large size of the list, it has been broken up into multiple pages.

- Temirbek Ibragimov (ru)
- Habibulla Ibragimov (ru)
- Aytkesh Ibraev (ru)
- Iskak Ibraev (ru)
- Vasily Ivanenko (ru)
- Vladimir Ivanilov (ru)
- Ivan Ivanilov (ru)
- Yegor Ivanin (ru)
- Fyodor Ivanishko (ru)
- Georgy Ivanishchev (ru)
- Yuri Ivankin (ru)
- Aleksandr Mikhailovich Ivannikov (ru)
- Afanasy Ivanovich Ivannikov (ru)
- Aleksandr Vasiliyevich Ivanov (ru)
- Aleksandr Ivanovich Ivanov (soldier) (ru)
- Aleksandr Ivanovich Ivanov (pilot) (ru)
- Aleksandr Mikhailovich Ivanov (ru)
- Aleksandr Pavlovich Ivanov (ru)
- Aleksandr Petrovich Ivanov (ru)
- Aleksandr Stepanovich Ivanov (ru)
- Aleksei Aleksandrovich Ivanov (ru)
- Aleksei Grigorievich Ivanov (ru)
- Aleksei Ivanovich Ivanov (ru)
- Aleksei Petrovich Ivanov (ru)
- Anatoly Aleksandrovich Ivanov (ru)
- Anatoly Vasilyevich Ivanov (ru)
- Boris Ivanov (ru)
- Vasily Gavrilovich Ivanov (ru)
- Vasily Yevgenyevich Ivanov (ru)
- Vasily Ivanovich Ivanov (ru)
- Vasily Konstantinovich Ivanov (ru)
- Vasily Makarovich Ivanov (ru)
- Vasily Mitrofanovich Ivanov (ru)
- Vasily Nikolayevich Ivanov (soldier) (ru)
- Vasily Nikolayevich Ivanov (Major-General) (ru)
- Vasily Stepanovich Ivanov (ru)
- Vasily Harlamovich Ivanov (ru)
- Viktor Alekseyevich Ivanov (ru)
- Viktor Pavlovich Ivanov (ru)
- Viktor Petrovich Ivanov (ru)
- Vitaly Andreyevich Ivanov (ru)
- Georgy Aleksandrovich Ivanov (ru)
- Georgy Vasilyevich Ivanov
- Georgy Kaklov Ivanov
- Georgy Fyodorovich Ivanov (ru)
- Georgy Yakovlevich Ivanov (ru)
- Grigory Ivanov (ru)
- Dmitry Pavlovich Ivanov (ru)
- Dmitry Trofimovich Ivanov (ru)
- Yegeny Ivanov (ru)
- Ivan Ivanovich Ivanov (soldier) (ru)
- Ivan Ivanovich Ivanov (pilot) (ru)
- Ivan Mikhailovich Ivanov (ru)
- Ivan Sergeyevich Ivanov (ru)
- Ivan Tikhonovich Ivanov (ru)
- Igor Ivanov (ru)
- Ilya Ivanov (ru)
- Konstantin Aleksandrovich Ivanov (ru)
- Konstantin Vasilyevich Ivanov (ru)
- Leonid Illarionovich Ivanov
- Leonid Petrovich Ivanov (ru)
- Mikhail Ivanovich Ivanov (artillery) (ru)
- Mikhail Ivanovich Ivanov (test pilot) (ru)
- Mikhail Ivanovich Ivanov (ground attack pilot) (ru)
- Mikhail Romanovich Ivanov (ru)
- Mikhail Fyodorovich Ivanov (Major) (ru)
- Mikhail Fyodorovich Ivanov (Junior sergeant) (ru)
- Nikolai Andreyevich Ivanov (ru)
- Nikolai Vasilyevich Ivanov (ru)
- Nikolai Dmitrievich Ivanov (ru)
- Nikolai Ivanovich Ivanov (ru)
- Nikolai Konstantinovich Ivanov (ru)
- Nikolai Maksimovich Ivanov (ru)
- Nikolai Pavlovich Ivanov (ru)
- Nikolai Petrovich Ivanov (ru)
- Nikolai Semyonovich Ivanov (1924—1972) (ru)
- Nikolai Semyonovich Ivanov (1926—2009) (ru)
- Pavel Ivanovich Ivanov (ru)
- Pavel Petrovich Ivanov (ru)
- Pyotr Artemyevich Ivanov (ru)
- Pyotr Ignatyevich Ivanov (ru)
- Pyotr Mikheyevich Ivanov (ru)
- Pyotr Platonovich Ivanov (ru)
- Roman Ivanov (ru)
- Semyon Maksimovich Ivanov (ru)
- Semyon Pavlovich Ivanov
- Sergey Alekseyevich Ivanov (ru)
- Sergey Andreyevich Ivanov (ru)
- Sergey Ivanovich Ivanov (Major) (ru)
- Sergey Ivanovich Ivanov (Captain) (ru)
- Sergey Makarovich Ivanov (ru)
- Stepan Gavrilovich Ivanov (ru)
- Stepan Dmitrievich Ivanov (ru)
- Fyodor Ivanovich Ivanov (ru)
- Fyodor Ivanovich Ivanov (ru)
- Fyodor Mikhailovich Ivanov (ru)
- Hasan Talibovich Ivanov (ru)
- Yakov Matveyevich Ivanov (ru)
- Boris Ivanovsky (ru)
- Yevgeny Ivanovsky
- Pavel Ivanovsky (ru)
- Pavel Ivanushkin (ru)
- Vasily Ivantsov (ru)
- Nikolai Ivantsov (ru)
- Andrei Ivanchenko (ru)
- Aleksandr Ivanchenkov (twice)
- Sergey Ivanchikov (ru)
- Aleksandr Ivanko (ru)
- Mikhail Ivasik (ru)
- Ivan Ivashina (ru)
- Grigory Ivashkevich (ru)
- Vasilu Ivashkin (ru)
- Aleksandr Ivashko (ru)
- Grigory Ivashko (ru)
- Sergey Ivashurov (ru)
- Pyotr Ivashutin
- Ivan Igantyevich Ivashchenko (ru)
- Ivan Timofeyevich Ivashchenko (ru)
- Mikhail Ivenkov (ru)
- Ivan Ivin (ru)
- Timofei Ivin (ru)
- Ivan Ivkin (ru)
- Aleksandr Ivkov (ru)
- Gavril Ivlev (ru)
- Dmitry Ivlev (ru)
- Ivan Ivliev (ru)
- Yuri Ivliev (ru)
- Pyotr Ivushkin (ru)
- Vladimir Ivchenko (ru)
- Mikhail Ivchenko (ru)
- Georgy Igishev (ru)
- Ivan Ignatenko (ru)
- Ilya Ignatenko (ru)
- Sergey Ignatkin (ru)
- Fyodor Ignatkin (ru)
- Gennady Ignatov (ru)
- Yevgeny Ignatov (ru)
- Nikolai Vasilyevich Ignatov (ru)
- Nikolai Konstantinovich Ignatov (ru)
- Andrei Aleksandrovich Ignatev (ru)
- Andrei Nikolayevich Ignatev (ru)
- Vladimir Ignatev (ru)
- Mikhail Ignatev (ru)
- Nikolai Ignatev
- Pyotr Ignatev (ru)
- Gavriil Ignashkin (ru)
- Sergey Igolchenko (ru)
- Vasily Igonin (ru)
- Aleksandr Igoshev (ru)
- Abukhadzhi Idrisov
- Gilemkhan Idrisov (ru)
- Anatoly Ievsky (ru)
- Fyodor Izhederov (ru)
- Aleksei Izhukin (ru)
- Nikolai Izhutov (ru)
- Viktor Izmadinov (ru)
- Nikolai Izyumov (ru)
- Vladimir Ikonnikov (ru)
- Isay Illazarov (ru)
- Stepan Illarinov (ru)
- Pavel Illyushko (ru)
- Ivan Ilgachev (ru)
- Ivan Ilev (ru)
- Yegeny Ilyin (ru)
- Ilya Ilyin (ru)
- Nikolai Sergeyevich Ilyin (ru)
- Nikolai Yakovlevich Ilyin (ru)
- Pyotr Ilyin (ru)
- Sergey Ilyin (ru)
- Stepan Ilyin (ru)
- Ivan Ilinykh (ru)
- Pyotr Ilichev (ru)
- Viktor Ilchenko (ru)
- Nikolai Ilchenko (ru)
- Semyon Ilchenko (ru)
- Nagi Ilyasov (ru)
- Georgiy Ilyachenko (ru)
- Ivan Ilyushin (ru)
- Vladimir Ilyushin
- Ivan Ilyasov (ru)
- Magsum Imamutdinov (ru)
- Georgy Inasaridza (ru)
- Aleksi Inauri
- Ivan Indryakov (ru)
- Ivan Indyk (ru)
- Semyon Indyk (ru)
- Akim Inozemtsev (ru)
- Georgy Inozemtsev (ru)
- Vladimir Iovlev (ru)
- Aleksei Iodis (ru)
- Grigory Ionin (ru)
- Pyotr Ionichev (ru)
- Anatoly Ionov (ru)
- Sergey Ionov (ru)
- Vladimir Ionosyan (ru)
- Yaroslav Iosseliani
- Feodosy Iotko (ru)
- Bois Irgashev (ru)
- Nikolai Irikov (ru)
- Aleksandr Irinin (ru)
- Kurbanbay Irisbekov (ru)
- Aleksei Isayev (ru)
- Vasily Vasilyevich Isayev (ru)
- Vasily Yefimovich Isayev (ru)
- Konstantin Isayev (ru)
- Nikolai Isayev (ru)
- Sergey Isayev (ru)
- Nikolai Isaenko (ru)
- Pyotr Isaichkin (ru)
- Mikhail Isayko (ru)
- Vasily Isaychenko (ru)
- Aleksandr Isakov (ru)
- Vasily Grigorievich Isakov (ru)
- Vasily Leonovich Isakov (ru)
- Georgy Petrovich Isakov (ru)
- Georgy Semyonovich Isakov (ru)
- Ivan Ivanovich Isakov (ru)
- Ivan Stepanovich Isakov
- Mikhail Isakov (ru)
- Pyotr Isakov (ru)
- Bergen Isakhanov (ru)
- Aleksandr Isachenko (ru)
- Rasul Isetov (ru)
- Aleksandr Isipin (ru)
- Kapay Iskakov (ru)
- Sundukkali Iskaliyev (ru)
- Nikolai Iskrin (ru)
- Yuri Islamov (ru)
- Konstantin Ismagulov (ru)
- Ishankul Ismailov (ru)
- Sydyk Ismailov (ru)
- Liparit Israelyan (ru)
- Abas Israfilov (ru)
- Vasily Istomin (ru)
- Viktor Istomin (ru)
- Yefim Istomin (ru)
- Pyotr Istratov (ru)
- Vladimir Istpashkin (ru)
- Nikolai Isupov (ru)
- Zinovy Iskhakov (ru)
- Abdusattar Ishankurlov (ru)
- Ishmay Ishkinin (ru)
- Gatiyat Ishkulov (ru)
- Tamerlan Ishmukhamedov (ru)
- Akhmadulla Ishmukhametov (ru)
- Nikolai Ishutin (ru)
- Istai Ishchanov (ru)
- Vasily Ishchenko (ru)
- Ivan Ishchenko (ru)
- Nikolai Ishchenko (ru)
