= List of Bashkir Heroes of the Soviet Union =

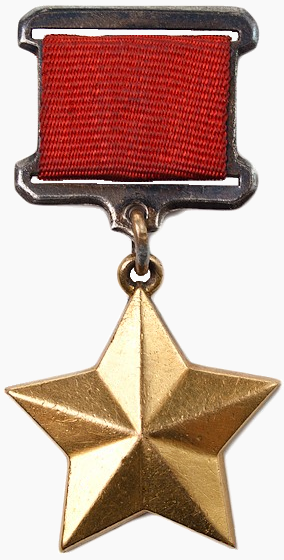
Hero of the USSR Gold star

This is a list of people that were awarded the title Hero of the Soviet Union of Bashkir ethnicity. It does not include non-Bashkir residents of Bashkortostan who were awarded the title.

- Minnetdin Aminov ru
- Gafiatulla Araslanov ru
- Gayfutdin Askin ru
- Mikhail Akhmedov ru
- Gabit Akhmedov ru
- Khakimyan Akhmetgalin ru
- Yayum Akhmetshin ru
- Gayz Baimurzin ru
- Galey Berdin ru
- Sultan Bikeyev ru
- Salman Biktimirov ru
- Khudat Bulatov ru
- Mirgay Farkhutdinov ru
- Khasan Gaisin ru
- Abdrakhman Gaifullin ru
- Musa Gareyev (twice)
- Shakir Gatiatullin
- Abdrauf Davletov ru
- Gatiyat Ishkulov ru
- Kutluakhmet Khaibullin ru
- Amir Khaidarov ru
- Timerbulat Khalikov ru
- Safa Khasanov ru
- Murat Kuzhakov ru
- Tagir Kusimov
- Kuddus Latipov ru
- Gumer Minnibayev ru
- Taftizan Minnigulov ru
- Gazis Murzagalimov ru
- Gabdulkhai Saitov ru
- Gimai Shaikhutdinov ru
- Fattakh Shamgulov ru
- Sharif Suleymanov ru
- Bary Sultanov ru
- Zhavdat Sunagatullin ru
- Sufy Sufyanov ru
- Mullayar Syrtlanov ru
- Zubai Utyagulov
- Shagy Yamaletdinov ru
