= Khusen Andrukh =

Soviet poet and journalist (1920–1941)

- Born: 2 March 1920; Khakurinokhabl, Maykopsky Otdel, Kuban Oblast, Russian SFSR
- Died: 8 November 1941 (aged 21); Dyakove, Antratsyt Raion, Voroshilovgrad Oblast, Ukrainian SSR, Soviet Union
- Military career
- Allegiance: Soviet Union
- Branch: Red Army (Infantry)
- Service years: 1940–1941
- Rank: Junior politruk
- Units: 2nd Rifle Company, 733rd Rifle Regiment; 136th Rifle Division; 18th Army, Southern Front
- Commands: Rifle company
- Conflicts: World War II
- Awards: Hero of the Soviet Union (1942); Order of Lenin (1942)

Khusen Andrukh (Adyghe: Андырхъуай Борэжъ ыкъо Хьусен, Russian: Хусен Борежевич Андрухаев; 2 March 1920 – 8 November 1941) was a Soviet Adyghe journalist, poet, and a posthumous Hero of the Soviet Union. He served as a junior political instructor (politruk) of a rifle company in the 733rd Rifle Regiment of the 136th Rifle Division (18th Army, Southern Front).

== Biography ==
Khusen Andrukhaev was born on 2 March 1920 in the aul of Khakurinokhabl (now in the Shovgenovsky District, Republic of Adygea) to a peasant family. He was of Circassian ethnicity. In 1935, he enrolled in the Adyghe Pedagogical Technical School. That same year, he participated in a conference of young writers in Rostov-on-Don. After graduating from the technical school in 1939, he worked in the editorial office of a local newspaper, and from June of that year, he became a correspondent for the regional newspaper Socialist Adygea (Адыгэ макъ). He was a known journalist and poet.

He joined the Red Army in January 1940. In 1941, after graduating from the Stalingrad Military-Political School, he was given the rank of junior politruk and appointed as the political instructor of a company in the 733rd Rifle Regiment of the 136th Rifle Division, 18th Army.

=== Feat ===
On 8 November 1941, during a fierce battle on the outskirts of the village of Dyakove in the Antratsyt Raion of the Voroshilovgrad Oblast (now Luhansk Oblast), German forces, having received reinforcements in tanks and manpower, attempted to capture the village as quickly as possible under heavy artillery and mortar fire. The Soviet troops needed to hold them off until reserves arrived. During the engagement, the company commander was killed, causing confusion among the soldiers.

At that moment, a loud voice rang out: "Listen to my command!" Rising to his full height, Junior Politruk Andrukhaev was the first to rush into the attack. The surviving soldiers of the company followed him. However, the significantly outnumbering enemy forces began to encircle the Red Army men, aiming primarily to capture the commander. Andrukhaev stayed behind to cover the unit's forced retreat.

When he ran out of ammunition and the Germans surrounded him, he took anti-tank grenades in both hands. Allowing the enemy to approach within four meters, he shouted "Take this, you bastards!" («Возьмите, гады!») and blew up himself along with the advancing enemy soldiers.

By a decree of the Presidium of the Supreme Soviet of the USSR on 27 March 1942, for the "exemplary performance of combat assignments of the command and the valor and courage displayed," Khusen Andrukhaev was posthumously awarded the title of Hero of the Soviet Union.

He was buried in a mass grave in the village of Dyakove.

== Awards ==
- Hero of the Soviet Union (27 March 1942)
- Order of Lenin (27 March 1942)

== Literary Work ==
Andrukhaev's first poem in the Adyghe language, "Shekhuradzhe", was published in 1934.

His most famous poems include "To the Portrait of Mayakovsky", "Two Lives", and "Two Auls". In 1971, a collection of his works titled I Will Sing was published in Maykop. In 1976, a bilingual collection in Russian and Adyghe titled Consider Me Alive was released, which was awarded the Nikolai Ostrovsky Literary Prize of the Kuban Komsomol.

== Memorials ==
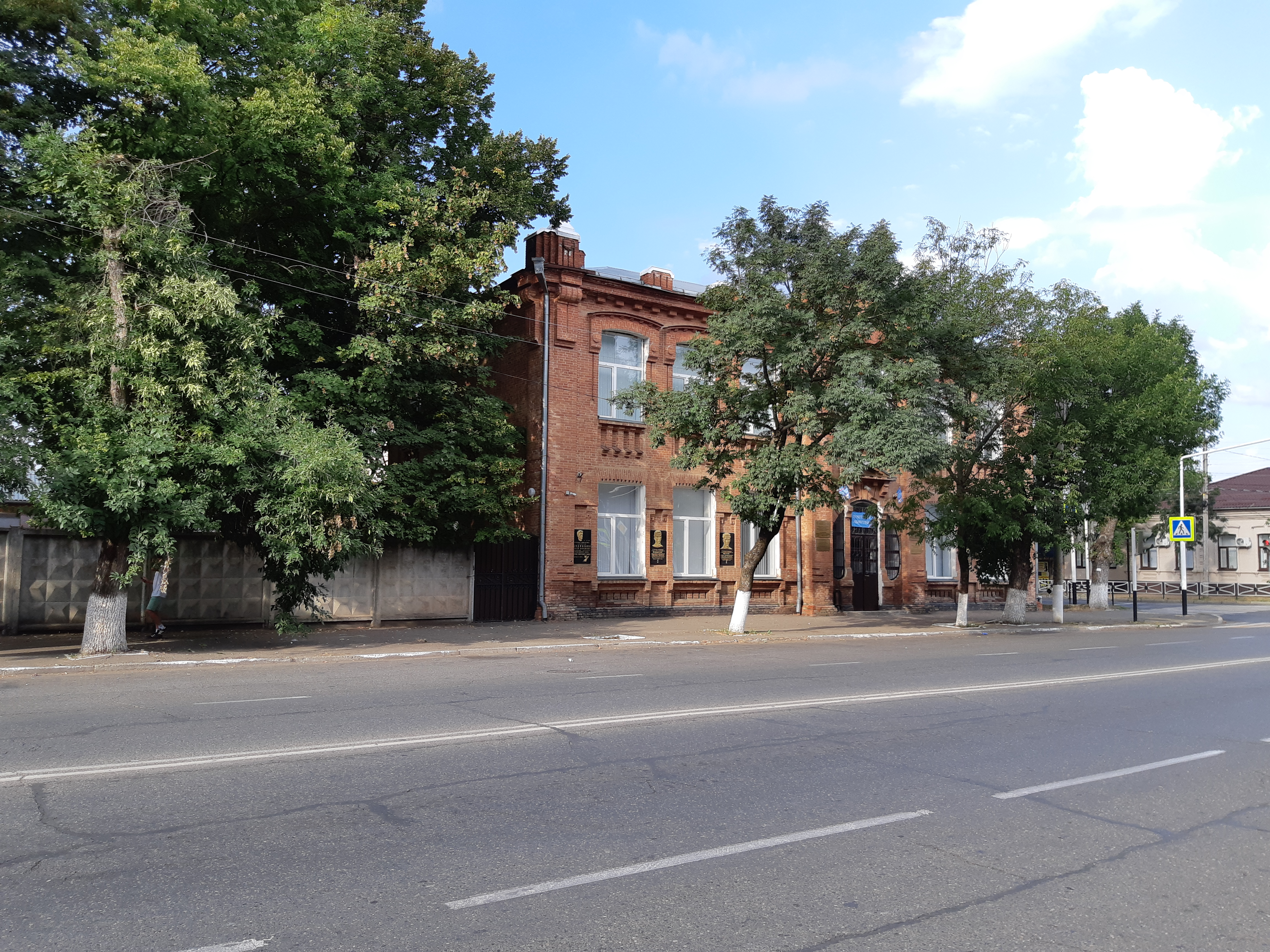
A commemorative plaque is installed on the building of the pedagogical school where the Hero studied.

- Streets are named after Andrukhaev in Maykop, Adygeysk, Tlyustenkhabl, Khakurinokhabl, Takhtamukay, Yablonovsky, Starobzhegokay, and in the village of Dyakove.
- A small motor ship operating between Anapa and Dzhemete is named in his honor.
- The Adyghe Pedagogical College in Maykop bears his name, and a memorial plaque is installed on the building.
- Monuments have been erected and museums opened in his native aul of Khakurinokhabl and in the village of Dyakove.
- A monument to Hero of the Soviet Union Khusen Andrukhaev stands in Dyakove, Luhansk Oblast.

== Interesting Fact ==
In October 1942, fellow Hero of the Soviet Union and sniper Nikolay Ilyin was presented with a sniper rifle named in honor of Khusen Andrukhaev. The command attached a metal plate to the rifle's stock bearing the inscription: "Named after Hero of the Soviet Union Kh. Andrukhaev".

== See also ==
- List of Heroes of the Soviet Union

== Bibliography ==
- Shkadov, Ivan (1987). Герои Советского Союза: Краткий биографический словарь [Heroes of the Soviet Union: A Brief Biographical Dictionary] (in Russian). Vol. 1. Moscow: Voenizdat.
- Sidzhakh, Khazretbiy (2018). Твои Герои, Адыгея: очерки о Героях Советского Союза и кавалерах ордена Славы трёх степеней [Your Heroes, Adygea: Essays on Heroes of the Soviet Union and Full Cavaliers of the Order of Glory] (in Russian). Maykop: Poligraf-Yug. pp. 9–21. ISBN 978-5-6040313-8-4.
- Dmitriykov, V. V., ed. (2005). Победители [The Victors] (in Russian). Vol. 1. Maykop: GURIPP "Adygea". pp. 1377–1383. ISBN 5-7992-0336-4.
- Sidzhakh, Khazretbiy (2005). Твои Герои, Адыгея: очерки о Героях Советского Союза [Your Heroes, Adygea: Essays on Heroes of the Soviet Union] (in Russian). Maykop: Adyghe Republican Book Publishing House. pp. 9–21. ISBN 5-7608-0459-6.
- Sidzhakh, Khazretbiy (2011). Герои России из Адыгеи [Heroes of Russia from Adygea] (in Russian). Maykop: Poligraf-Yug. pp. 116. ISBN 978-5-7992-0668-0.
- Aleshchenko, N. M. (1981). Долг и подвиг [Duty and Feat] (in Russian). Moscow. pp. 8–25.
- Zhané, Kirimize (1974). Хусен Андрухаев [Khusen Andrukhaev] (in Russian). Moscow.
