= List of Heroes of the Soviet Union (U) =

The title Hero of the Soviet Union was the highest distinction of the Soviet Union. It was awarded 12,775 times. Due to the large size of the list, it has been broken up into multiple pages.

- Yelena Ubiyvovk
- Vasily Uvarov ru
- Aleksey Uvatov ru
- Innokenty Uvachan ru
- Semyon Uganin ru
- Mikhail Ugarov ru
- Anatoly Uglovsky ru
- Mikhail Uglovsky ru
- Fyodor Ugnachyov ru
- Nikolai Ugryumov ru
- Spartak Ugryumov ru
- Vasily Udalov ru
- Ivan Udalov ru
- Yefim Udaltsov ru
- Nikolai Udarov ru
- Grigory Udartsev ru
- Vasily Udachin ru
- Stepan Udov ru
- Aleksandr Udovichenko ru
- Ivan Udovichenko ru
- Ivan Udod ru
- Aleksandr Udodov ru
- Ablakul Uzakov ru
- Vladimir Uzu ru
- Kirill Ukleba ru
- Mikhail Ukolov ru
- Ivan Ukradyshenko ru
- Dmity Ulanin ru
- Ilya Ulanov ru
- Nikolai Ulanovsky ru
- Aleksandr Ulasovets ru
- Ivan Ulitin ru
- Nikolai Ulitin ru
- Pavel Ulitsky ru
- Ivan Ulybin ru
- Walter Ulbricht
- Nina Ulyanenko
- Fyodor Ulyanin ru
- Vitaly Ulyanov ru
- Georgy Ulyanov ru
- Ivan Mikhailovich Ulyanov ru
- Ivan Fedoseevich Ulyanov ru
- Sergey Ulyanov ru
- Georgy Ulyanovsky ru
- Terenty Umansky ru
- Fyodor Umansky ru
- Salikh Umarov ru
- Shadman Umarov ru
- Abdulkhak Umerkin ru
- Mukhazhir Ummaev ru
- Andrey Umnikov ru
- Mukhitdin Umurdinov ru
- Aleksey Unzhakov ru
- Ilyas Urazov ru
- Chutak Urazov ru
- Yesen Urakbaev ru
- Bronislav Urbanavichus ru
- Yakov Urvantsev ru
- Idrus Urgenishbaev ru
- Konstantin Urzhunstev ru
- Vladimir Urzlya ru
- Vitaly Urukov ru
- Noy Urushadze ru
- Pavel Uryupin ru
- Viktor Us ru
- Ivan Us ru
- Ilya Usanin ru
- Valentin Usanov ru
- Konstantin Usanov ru
- Grigory Usaty ru
- Ivan Usatyuk ru
- Mikhail Usachyov ru
- Filipp Usachyov ru
- Kalynur Usenbekov ru
- Yevgeny Usenko ru
- Ivan Arkhipovich Usenko ru
- Ivan Romanovich Usenko ru
- Konstantin Usenko ru
- Leonty Usenko ru
- Nikolai Vitalevich Usenko ru
- Nikolai Ilyich Usenko
- Abdulla Usenov ru
- Ivan Usik ru
- Moisey Usik ru
- Ivan Usilov ru
- Vasily Uskov ru
- Dzhurakhan Usmanov ru
- Islam Usmanov ru
- Viktor Usov ru
- Vladimir Usov ru
- Nikifor Usov ru
- Pavel Usov ru
- Stepan Ustimenko ru
- Aleksandr Ustinov ru
- Dmitry Ustinov
- Ivan Makarovich Ustinov ru
- Ivan Timofeevich Ustinov ru
- Semyon Ustinov ru
- Stepan Ustinov ru
- Yakov Ustyuzhanin ru
- Yegor Utev ru
- Aleksandr Utin ru
- Andrey Utin ru
- Vasily Utin ru
- Valery Utkin ru
- Yevgeny Dmitrievich Utkin ru
- Yevgeny Ivanovich Utkin ru
- Ilya Ilyich Utkin ru
- Ilya Nikiforovich Utkin ru
- Zubai Utyagulov
- Konstantin Ufimtsev ru
- Sergey Ufimtsev ru
- Valery Ukhabov ru
- Ilya Ukho ru
- Aleksandr Ushakov ru
- Vasily Ushakov ru
- Viktor Ushakov ru
- Dmitry Ushakov ru
- Mikhail Ushakov ru
- Nikolai Ushakov ru
- Pyotr Ushakov ru
- Sergey Ushakov ru
- Stepan Ushakov ru
- Sergey Ushanev ru
- Dmitry Ushkov ru
- Grigory Ushpolis ru
- Boris Ushchev ru
