= Murat Kardan =

- Born: 31 December 1916; Vako-Zhile, Kuban Oblast, Russian Empire (now Karachay-Cherkessia, Russia)
- Died: 31 January 1987 (aged 70); Cherkessk, Karachay-Cherkess Autonomous Oblast, Russian SFSR, Soviet Union
- Military career
- Allegiance: Soviet Union
- Branch: Red Army
- Service years: 1939–1948
- Rank: Lieutenant
- Units: 301st Guards Rifle Regiment; 100th Guards Rifle Division; 37th Guards Rifle Corps; 7th Army
- Conflicts: World War II: Svir–Petrozavodsk offensive
- Awards: Hero of the Soviet Union; Order of Lenin; Order of the Patriotic War 1st class

Murat Kardan (Kabardian: Къардэн ӏэсхьэд ыкъуэ Мурат; Russian: Мурат Асхадович Карданов; 31 December 1916 – 31 January 1987) was a Red Army Lieutenant, a platoon commander in the 301st Guards Rifle Regiment of the 100th Guards Rifle Division (37th Guards Rifle Corps, 7th Army, Karelian Front), and a Hero of the Soviet Union.

== Biography ==
He was born on 31 December (18 December O.S.) 1916 in the aul of Vako-Zhile, now in the Adyge-Khablsky District of the Karachay-Cherkess Republic, to a peasant family. He was of Circassian ethnicity. He became a member of the All-Union Communist Party (Bolsheviks) in 1940. He completed his incomplete secondary education in the stanitsa of Batalpashinskaya (now Cherkessk). Before the war, he worked in the Adyge-Khablsky district military commissariat of the Cherkess Autonomous Oblast.

Drafted into the Red Army in 1939, he initially served as a military builder and later as a cadet at the Irkutsk Cavalry School, from which he graduated in 1942. He subsequently underwent training in the airborne troops. In June 1944, Kardanov arrived at the Karelian Front as part of the 37th Guards Rifle Corps.

During the Svir–Petrozavodsk offensive, Guards Senior Sergeant Murat Kardanov skillfully organized the combat actions of his platoon in the 301st Guards Rifle Regiment.

On 22 June 1944, during the breakthrough of the enemy's defenses, his platoon captured part of an enemy stronghold—the village of Karelskaya. They then crossed the Yangera river near the city of Lodeynoye Pole in the Leningrad Oblast. The platoon seized and held a defensive line for two hours, successfully securing the river crossing for the rest of their battalion.

On 25 June 1944, Kardan took command of his company after its commander was put out of action. The company, led by Guards Senior Sergeant Kardanov, captured a key enemy stronghold near the villages of Sambatuksa and Pipilitsa in the Olonetsky District of Karelia.

By a decree of the Presidium of the Supreme Soviet of the USSR on 21 July 1944, for the "exemplary performance of combat missions and the courage and heroism displayed in the fight against the German fascist invaders," Guards Senior Sergeant Murat Askhadovich Kardanov was awarded the title of Hero of the Soviet Union, along with the Order of Lenin and the "Gold Star" medal (No. 4103).

After a long period of treatment in military hospitals, Lieutenant Kardanov retired to the reserve in 1948 and later fully retired as a disabled veteran of the Great Patriotic War. He lived and worked in the capital of Karachay-Cherkessia, Cherkessk. He died on 31 January 1987 and was buried in Cherkessk.

== Awards ==
- Hero of the Soviet Union (21 July 1944, Medal No. 4103)
- Order of Lenin (21 July 1944)
- Order of the Patriotic War 1st class (1985)
- Campaign and jubilee medals

== Memorials ==
- A street is named in honor of the Paratrooper Heroes in the city of Ramenskoye, Moscow Oblast, where the 100th Guards Airborne Division was originally formed.

== See also ==
- List of Heroes of the Soviet Union
