= List of Heroes of the Soviet Union (Z) =

The title Hero of the Soviet Union was the highest distinction of the Soviet Union. It was awarded 12,775 times. Due to the large size of the list, it has been broken up into multiple pages.

- Semyon Zabagonsky ru
- Vyacheslav Zabaluev ru
- Ivan Zabegaylo ru
- Grigory Zabelin ru
- Nikolai Zebelkin ru
- Ivan Zabobonov ru
- Ivan Zabolotny ru
- Anatoly Zabolotsky ru
- Konstantin Zaborovsky ru
- Stepan Zaborev ru
- Aleksandr Zaboyarkin ru
- Nikolai Zabrodin ru
- Anatoly Zabronsky ru
- Nikolai Zabyrin ru
- Mikhail Zavadovsky ru
- Vladimir Zavadsky ru
- Viktor Zavalin ru
- Andrey Zavarzin ru
- Grigory Zavarin ru
- Ivan Zavarykin ru
- Vasily Zavgorodny ru
- Grigory Zavgorodny ru
- Yegor Zavelitsky ru
- Yakov Zavertalyuk ru
- Veniamin Zavertyaev ru
- Nikolai Zaveryukha ru
- Matevy Zavodsky ru
- Boris Zavoryzgin ru
- Ivan Zavrazhnov ru
- Nikolai Zavrazhnov ru
- Nikolai Zavyalov ru
- Semyon Zavyalov ru
- Sergey Zavyalov ru
- Vasily Zagaynov ru
- Georgy Zagaynov ru
- Stepan Zagaynov ru
- Aleksandr Zagarinsky ru
- Fakhrutdin Zagidulin ru
- Vladimir Zagnoy ru
- Anatoly Zagovenev ru
- Vasily Zagorodnev ru
- Mikhail Zagorodsky ru
- Dmitry Zagorulko ru
- Stepan Zagrebin ru
- Ivan Zagryadsky ru
- Vasily Zadkov ru
- Nikolai Zadorin ru
- Vladimir Zadorozhny ru
- Grigory Zadorozhny ru
- Ivan Zadorozhny ru
- Mikhail Alekseyevich Zadorozhny ru
- Mikhail Ignatevich Zadorozhny ru
- Yakov Zadorozhny ru
- Viktor Zaevsky ru
- Ivan Zazhigin ru
- Grigory Zaika ru
- Vasily Zaikin ru
- Ivan Zaikin ru
- Mitrofan Zaikin ru
- Sergey Zaikin ru
- Fyodor Zaikin ru
- Vladimir Zaimov
- Nikolai Zaiyulev ru
- Ivan Zaikin ru
- Nikolai Zaikovsky ru
- Aleksandr Zaitsev ru
- Aleksey Zaitsev ru
- Boris Zaitsev ru
- Valentin Zaitsev ru
- Vasily Aleksandrovich Zaitsev (twice)
- Vasily Vasilyevich Zaitsev ru
- Vasily Vladimirovich Zaitsev ru
- Vasily Georgievich Zaitsev ru
- Vasily Grigorievich Zaitsev
- Vasily Ivanovich Zaitsev (lieutenant) ru
- Vasily Ivanovich Zaitsev (lieutenant colonel) ru
- Vasily Mikhailovich Zaitsev ru
- Vasily Petrovich Zaitsev ru
- Veniamin Zaitsev ru
- Gennady Zaitsev ru
- Dmitry Aleksandrovich Zaitsev ru
- Dmitry Mikhailovich Zaitsev ru
- Ivan Dmitrievich Zaitsev ru
- Ivan Nikolaevich Zaitsev ru
- Ivan Petrovich Zaitsev ru
- Ivan Stepanovich Zaitsev ru
- Ivan Fyodorovich Zaitsev ru
- Konstantin Zaitsev ru
- Mikhail Zaitsev
- Nikolai Ivanovich Zaitsev ru
- Nikolai Ilyich Zaitsev ru
- Nikolai Sergeyevich Zaitsev ru
- Nikolai Yakovlevich Zaitsev ru
- Pavel Zaitsev ru
- Stepan Zaitsev ru
- Yakov Zaitsev ru
- Akhmet Zakirov ru
- Gali Zakirov ru
- Kirill Zaklepa ru
- Ivan Zaklyuka ru
- Nikolai Zakorkin ru
- Vladimir Zakudryaev ru
- Stepan Zakurdaev ru
- Nikolai Zakutenko ru
- Vladimir Zalevsky ru
- Prokhor Zalesov ru
- Khasan Zamanov ru
- Pavel Zamiralov ru
- Mikhail Gavrilovich Zamula ru
- Mikhail Kuzmich Zamula ru
- Mikhail Zamulaev ru
- Pyotr Zamchalov ru
- Ivan Zamyatin ru
- Ivan Zanin ru
- Aleksandr Zapadinsky ru
- Igor Zaporozhan ru
- Sergey Zaporozhets ru
- Fyodor Zaporozhets ru
- Ivan Zaporozhsky ru
- Grigory Zaporozhchenko ru
- Dmitry Zaporozhchenko ru
- Vladimir Zarembo ru
- Pavel Zaretsky ru
- Mikhail Zaretskikh ru
- Ivan Zarnikov ru
- Anatoly Zarovnyaev ru
- Vladimir Zarubin ru
- Ivan Zarubin ru
- Yuri Zarudin ru
- Stepan Zarudnev ru
- Nikolai Zaryanov ru
- Vyacheslav Zasedatelev ru
- Konstantin Zaslonov
- Ivan Zasorin ru
- Vladimir Zasyadko ru
- Vyacheslav Zatylkov ru
- Ivan Zatynaychenko ru
- Ivan Zaulin ru
- Aleksey Arkhipovich Zakharov ru
- Aleksey Ivanovich Zakharov (lieutenant) ru
- Aleksey Ivanovich Zakharov (sergeant) ru
- Aleksey Nikonorovich Zakharov ru
- Vasily Grigorievich Zakharov ru
- Vasily Ivanovich Zakharov ru
- Vasily Yakovlevich Zakharov ru
- Viktor Zakharov ru
- Gennady Zakharov ru
- Georgy Zakharov
- Ivan Yegorovich Zakharov ru
- Ivan Konstantinovich Zakharov ru
- Ivan Kuzmich Zakharov ru
- Konstantin Zakharov ru
- Lev Zakharov ru
- Matvey Zakharov
- Mitrofan Zakharov ru
- Nikolai Dmitrievich Zakharov ru
- Nikolai Nikolaevich Zakharov ru
- Nikolai Sergeyevich Zakharov ru
- Pyotr Zakharov ru
- Sergey Zakharov ru
- Fyodor Zakharov ru
- Vasily Zakharchenko ru
- Grigory Zakharchenko ru
- Mikhail Zakharchenko ru
- Pavel Zakharchenko ru
- Aleksandr Zakharchuk ru
- Nikolai Zakharchuk ru
- Vaginak Zakharyan ru
- Nikanor Zakhvataev
- Aleksandr Zakhodsky ru
- Lev Zatsepa ru
- Fyodor Zatsepilov ru
- Aleksey Zatsepilov ru
- Vasily Zacheslavsky ru
- Pytor Zachinyaev ru
- Mikhail Zashibalov ru
- Vasily Zayakin ru
- Denis Zayats ru
- Grigory Zbanatsky ru
- Panteley Zvarygin ru
- Ivan Zvezdin ru
- Anatoly Zverev ru
- Valentin Pavlovich Zverev ru
- Vasily Andreyevich Zverev ru
- Vasily Vasilyevich Zverev ru
- Vasily Vladimirovich Zverev ru
- Georgy Zverev ru
- Ivan Zverev ru
- Nikolai Aleksandrovich Zverev ru
- Nikolai Kuzmich Zverev ru
- Nikolai Zverintsev ru
- Pyotr Zverkov ru
- Stepan Zvonaryov ru
- Trofim Zvonkov ru
- Aleksandr Zvyagin ru
- Andrey Zvyagin ru
- Pyotr Zgama ru
- Dmitry Zhabinsky ru
- Nikolai Zhaboedov ru
- Vasily Zhavoronkov ru
- Viktor Zhagala ru
- Ivan Zhagrenkov ru
- Maksim Zhadeykin ru
- Aleksey Zhadov
- Kuzhabai Zhazykov ru
- Vladimir Zhayvoron ru
- Sadyk Zhaksygulov ru
- Fyodor Zhaldak ru
- Semyon Zhalo ru
- Darma Zhanaev ru
- Zbdulla Zhanzakov ru
- Anatoly Zharikov ru
- Ivan Zharikov ru
- Vladimir Zharkov ru
- Sergey Zharov ru
- Fyodor Zharov ru
- Fyodor Zharchinsky ru
- Mikhail Zhbanov ru
- Filipp Zhgirov ru
- Aleksey Zhdanov ru
- Vladimir Zhdanov
- Yefim Zhdanov ru
- Pavel Zhdanov ru
- Leonid Zhdanovsky ru
- Aleksandr Zhevarchenkov ru
- Leonid Zhegalov ru
- Aleksandr Zhezherya ru
- Ivan Zhelvakov ru
- Nikolai Zhelezny ru
- Spartak Zhelezny ru
- Pyotr Zheleznyakov ru
- Fyodor Zhelnov ru
- Pavel Zheltikov ru
- Iosif Zheltobryukh ru
- Akim Zheltov ru
- Aleksey Zheltov ru
- Ivan Zheltoplyasov ru
- Pyotr Zheltukhin ru
- Ivan Zhemchuzhnikov ru
- Vladimir Zhenchenko ru
- Nikolai Zherdev ru
- Yevgeny Zherdy ru
- Dmitry Zherebilov ru
- Dmitry Zherebin ru
- Vasily Grigorievich Zherebtsov ru
- Vasily Semyonovich Zherebtsov ru
- Ivan Ivanovich Zherebtsov ru
- Ivan Kuzmich Zherebtsov ru
- Aleksandr Ivanovich Zhestkov ru
- Aleksandr Petrovich Zhestkov ru
- Todor Zhivkov
- Anatoly Zhivov ru
- Mikhail Zhivolup ru
- Iosif Zhigarev ru
- Fyodor Zhigarin ru
- Yevgeniya Zhigulenko
- Boris Zhigulenkov ru
- Kirill Zhigulsky ru
- Vladimir Zhigunov ru
- Aleksandr Zhidkikh ru
- Ivan Andreyevich Zhidkov ru
- Ivan Sergeyevich Zhidkov ru
- Pyotr Zhidkov ru
- Georgy Zhidov ru
- Aleksey Zhizhkun ru
- Fyodor Zhila ru
- Aleksandr Zhilin ru
- Vasily Zhilin
- Yegor Zhilin ru
- Dmitry Zhilkin ru
- Vasily Zhiltsov ru
- Lev Zhiltsov
- Konstantin Zhilyaev ru
- Vasily Zhikharev ru
- Nikolai Zhikharev ru
- Nikolai Zhmaev ru
- Vasily Zhmakin ru
- Filipp Zhmachenko
- Ivan Zhmurko ru
- Dmitry Zhmurovsky ru
- Seliverst Zhogin ru
- Semyon Zhogov ru
- Stepan Zholob ru
- Vitaly Zholobov
- Viktor Zholudev
- Leonid Zholudev ru
- Naum Zholudev ru
- Semyon Zhorov ru
- Pavel Zhuvasin ru
- Nikolai Zhugan
- Ivan Zhudov ru
- Nikolai Zhuzhoma ru
- Ivan Zhuzhukin ru
- Aleksandr Zhuk ru
- Nikolai Zhukanov ru
- Aleksandr Zhukov ru
- Andrey Zhukov ru
- Valentin Zhukov ru
- Vasily Alekseyevich Zhukov ru
- Vasily Yegorovich Zhukov ru
- Vasily Petrovich Zhukov ru
- Vasily Frolovich Zhukov ru
- Vladimir Zhukov ru
- Georgy Ivanovich Zhukov ru
- Marshall Georgy Zhukov (four times)
- Grigory Zhukov ru
- Danil Zhukov ru
- Ivan Yefimovich Zhukov
- Ivan Mikhailovich Zhukov ru
- Ivan Fyodorovich Zhukov ru
- Konstantin Zhukov ru
- Mikhail Zhukov ru
- Nikolai Zhukov ru
- Pyotr Konstantinovich Zhukov ru
- Pyotr Sergeyevich Zhukov ru
- Roman Zhukov ru
- Stepan Zhukov ru
- Fyodor Zhukov ru
- Nikolai Zhukovsky ru
- Pyotr Zhukovsky ru
- Fyodor Zhulov ru
- Pyotr Zhulyabin ru
- Sergey Zhunin ru
- Mikhail Zhuravkov ru
- Aleksandr Zhuravlyov ru
- Aleksey Zhuravlyov ru
- Andriyan Zhuravlyov ru
- Vasily Zhuravlyov ru
- Ivan Zhuravlyov ru
- Lavrenty Zhuravlyov ru
- Pyotr Zhuravlyov ru
- Stpean Zhuravlyov ru
- Ivan Makarovich Zhurba ru
- Ivan Timofeyevich Zhurba ru
- Pavel Zhurba ru
- Ivan Zhurilo ru
- Grigory Zhuchenko ru
- Pavel Zhuchenko ru
- Porfiry Zhuchkov ru
- Tikhon Zhuchkov ru
- Stepan Zdorovtsev ru
- Vasily Zdunov ru
- Nikolai Zebnitsky ru
- Valentin Zevakhin ru
- Mikhail Zevakhin ru
- Aleksandr Zeyberlin ru
- Vladimir Zelenyov ru
- Andrey Zelenin ru
- Yegor Zelyonkin ru
- Mikhail Zelyonkin ru
- Yekaterina Zelenko
- Nikolai Zelenov
- Gavriil Zelensky ru
- Fyodor Zelensky ru
- Valentin Zelentsov ru
- Viktor Zelentsov ru
- Iosif Zelenyuk ru
- Ivan Zelepukin ru
- Yevgeny Zelnyakov ru
- Aleksandr Zemkov ru
- Vasily Zemlyakov ru
- Andrey Zemlyanov ru
- Serafim Zemlyanov ru
- Vladimir Zemlyansky ru
- Filimon Zemlyanykh ru
- Ivan Zemnukhov ru
- Vladimir Zemzkikh ru
- Mikhail Zemskov ru
- Nikolai Zemtsov ru
- Pyotr Zemtsov ru
- Illarion Zenin ru
- Nikolai Zenkov ru
- Arkady Zenkovsky ru
- Vladimir Zentsov ru
- Yefrosinya Zenkova
- Sergey Zernin ru
- Mukhamed Ziangirov ru
- Vasily Ziborov ru
- Ivan Zibrov ru
- Ilya Zigunenko ru
- Viktor Zikeyev ru
- Yevgeny Zikran ru
- Ivan Zima ru
- Ivan Zimakov ru
- Viktor Zimin ru
- Georgy Zimin ru
- Yevgeny Zimin ru
- Sergey Zimin ru
- Yakov Zimin ru
- Vasily Zimnyagin ru
- Abram Zibdels ru
- Ivan Zinenko ru
- Andrey Zinin ru
- Nabiulla Zinnurov ru
- Nikolai Zinov ru
- Vasily Zinovev ru
- Ivan Alekseyevich Zinovev ru
- Ivan Dmitrievich Zinovev ru
- Ivan Ivanovich Zinovev ru
- Nikolai Anisimovich Zinovev ru
- Nikolai Ivanovich Zinovev ru
- Fyodor Zinovev ru
- Mikhail Zinukov ru
- Aleksandr Zinchenko ru
- Aleksey Zinchenko ru
- Valentin Zinchenko ru
- Ivan Mikhailovich Zinchenko ru
- Ivan Trofimovich Zinchenko ru
- Nikifor Zinchenko ru
- Nikolai Zinchenko ru
- Sergey Zinchenko ru
- Fyodor Zinchenko ru
- Mitrofan Zinkovich ru
- Yefim Zlatin ru
- Yakov Zlobin ru
- Grigory Zlotin ru
- Ivan Zlygostev ru
- Ivan Zlydenny ru
- Vasily Zlydnev ru
- Mikhail Zmyslya ru
- Valerian Znamensky ru
- Vladimir Znamensky ru
- Andrey Zozulya ru
- Georgy Zozulya ru
- Maksim Zozulya ru
- Ivan Zolin ru
- Andrey Zolkin ru
- Aleksey Zolotaryov ru
- Ivan Zolotaryov ru
- Semyon Zolotaryov ru
- Fyodor Zolototrubov ru
- Boris Zolotukhin ru
- Mikhail Zolotukhin ru
- Mikhail Zonov ru
- Nikolai Zonov ru
- Panteley Zonov ru
- Rikhard Zorge ru
- Aleksey Zorin ru
- Grigory Zorin ru
- Ivan Zorin ru
- Sergey Ivanovich Zorin ru
- Sergey Petrovich Zorin ru
- Vasily Zorkin ru
- Viktor Zotov ru
- Ivan Zotov ru
- Matvey Zotov ru
- Ivan Zrelov ru
- Nikolai Zub ru
- Feofilakt Zubanov ru
- Nikolai Zubanev ru
- Aleksandr Gordeyevich Zubarev ru
- Aleksandr Fyodorovich Zubarev ru
- Vasily Zubarev ru
- Ivan Zubarev ru
- Mikhail Zubarev ru
- Ivan Zubenko ru
- Pavel Zubenko ru
- Pyotr Zubko ru
- Aleksandr Zubkov ru
- Ivan Zubkov ru
- Antonina Zubkova
- Grigory Zubov ru
- Leonid Zubov ru
- Pyotr Zubov ru
- Konstantin Zubovich ru
- Vasily Zudilov ru
- Ivan Zudilov ru
- Sergey Zudlov ru
- Vyacheslav Zudov
- Aleksey Alekseyevich Zuev ru
- Aleksey Mikhailovich Zuev ru
- Gavriil Zuev ru
- Ivan Dmitrievich Zuev ru
- Ivan Fadeyevich Zuev ru
- Kuzma Zuev ru
- Mikhail Zuev ru
- Nikolai Zuev ru
- Ivan Zuenko ru
- Aleksey Zuykov ru
- Boris Zumbulidze ru
- Ivan Zybin ru
- Filipp Zykin ru
- Nikolai Zykov ru
- Yuri Zykov ru
- Vasily Zyl ru
- Pavel Zyubin ru
- Vasily Zyuzin ru
- Dmitry Zyuzin ru
- Pyotr Zyuzin ru
- Sergey Zyuzin ru
- Ivan Zyuz ru
- Pyotr Zyulkov ru
- Vasily Zyulkovsky ru
