= List of Heroes of the Soviet Union (H) =

The Hero of the Soviet Union was the highest distinction of the Soviet Union. It was awarded 12,775 times. Due to the large size of the list, it has been broken up into multiple pages.

== List of Heroes of the Soviet Union (H) ==
Recipient	Conferred on	Conferred posthumously	Conferred for
Umar Habekov ru	11 December 1990	Yes	actions in the offensive towards the Danube Canal
Zaki Habibullin ru	27 February 1945	No	actions in Poland during World War II
Vildan Habiev ru	30 October 1943	No	actions in the Battle of the Dnieper
Horen Hachatryan ru	24 March 1945	No	actions in the Battle of Sevastopol
Gumir Hadimukhametov ru	22 July 1944	No	actions in the Vitebsk offensive
Kutluahmet Haibullin ru	15 January 1944	Yes	actions in the Gomel offensive
Amir Haidarov ru	15 January 1944	No	actions in the Gomel offensive
Gainansha Haidarshin ru	22 February 1944	No	actions in the Battle of the Dnieper
Habibulla Hairullin ru	10 April 1945	Yes	actions in Poland during World War II
Halil Hairullin ru	24 March 1945	No	actions in Lithuania during World War II
Akram Haitrutdinov ru	20 April 1945	Yes	participation in the Olshansky landing
Mingas Haitrutdinov ru	24 March 1945	No	actions in Lithuania during World War II
Alim Hakimov ru	27 February 1945	No	actions in the Vistula–Oder Offensive
Mikhail Hakimov ru	20 April 1945	No	actions in the Battle of Odessa
Nematjon Hakimov ru	6 May 1965	Yes	suicide-attacking a German tank with grenades
Orazberdy Hakimov ru	27 June 1945	Yes	actions in Poland during World War II
Ruben Hakobyan	16 May 1944	No	actions in the Battle for Crimea during World War II
Gevorg Hakobyants	3 June 1944	No	actions in the Battle of the Dnieper
Islam Halikov ru	24 March 1945	Yes	actions in combat near the Dniester estuary
Timirbulat Halikov ru	15 January 1944	No	actions in the Battle of the Dnieper
Misbakh Haliulin ru	18 August 1945	No	flying 88 sorties on the Il-2
Ismail Hamzaliev ru	8 September 1943	Yes	actions in the Battle of Kursk
Muydin Hasanov ru	17 November 1943	No	actions in the Kerch-Eltigen operation
Hakim Hasanov ru	17 October 1943	Yes	actions in the Battle of Kursk
Safa Hasanov ru	27 September 1943	No	actions in the Battle of the Dnieper
Gurgen Hayrapetyan	7 April 1940	No	attack against the Mannerheim Line
Armen Hayriyan	13 April 1944	No	reportedly making 105 combat sorties
Semyon Hazaryan ru	1 November 1943	No	actions in the Battle of the Dnieper
Vaily Haziev ru	22 July 1944	No	actions in the Vitebsk offensive
Nazip Hazipov ru	27 June 1945	Yes	actions in Poland during World War II
Mirosław Hermaszewski	5 July 1978	No	Cosmonaut
Juliusz Hibner	11 November 1943	No	Polish military leader
Ernafas Hojayev ru	24 March 1945	Yes	actions in Poland during World War II
Erich Honecker	25 August 1982	No	Leader of East Germany
Jumaniyaz Hudaybergenov ru	10 January 1944	Yes	actions in the Battle of the Dnieper
Gustáv Husák	9 January 1973	No	Leader of Czechoslovakia
Ahmediar Husainov ru	1 November 1943	No	actions in the Melitopol offensive
Ziyamat Husanov ru	22 February 1944	No (mistakenly thought to be posthumous)	Mistakenly believed to have been KIA. Title revoked in 1952 and restored in 1968.
Habibullah Huseynov	29 June 1945	Yes	actions during the Samland Offensive
Mehdi Huseynzade	11 April 1957	Yes	Parisan during World War II
Sapar Hushnazarov ru	15 January 1944	Yes	actions in the Battle of the Dnieper
Zyakyary Husyainov ru	24 March 1945	Yes	actions in Hungary during World War II
Hryhoriy Kuropyatnykov uk	July 24 1943	No	Black Sea campaigns (1941–1944)
