= List of Heroes of the Soviet Union (F) =

The Hero of the Soviet Union was the highest distinction of the Soviet Union. It was awarded 12,775 times. Due to the large size of the list, it has been broken up into multiple pages.

- Vasily Fabrichnov (ru)
- Vladimir Fagotov (ru)
- Aleksandr Danilovich Fadeev (ru)
- Aleksandr Ilyich Fadeev (ru)
- Aleksey Fadeev (ru)
- Vadim Fadeev (ru)
- Vasily Fadeev (ru)
- Ivan Fadeev (ru)
- Nikolai Aleksandrovich Fadeev (ru)
- Sergey Fadeev (ru)
- Boris Fadyushin (ru)
- Stepan Fazhdeyev (ru)
- Nurulla Fazlaev (ru)
- Khanif Fayzulin (ru)
- Zhingansha Fayzullin (ru)
- Fyodor Fak (ru)
- Aleksey Falin (ru)
- Vasily Falin (ru)
- Dmitry Falin (ru)
- Mikhail Falmonov (ru)
- Muhammed Faris
- Bertalan Farkas
- Dmitry Fartushny (ru)
- Boris Faruntsev (ru)
- Mirgai Farkhutdinov (ru)
- Aviard Fasrovets (ru)
- Ivan Fateyev (ru)
- Valentin Fatin (ru)
- Sergey Fatkin (ru)
- Farit Faktulin (ru)
- Anvar Fatkullin (ru)
- Andrey Fatyanov (ru)
- Mikhail Fatyanov (ru)
- Mikhail Fayazov (ru)
- Mikhail Akimovich Fedin (ru)
- Mikhail Aleksandrovich Fedin (ru)
- Nikolai Fedin (ru)
- Fyodor Fedin (ru)
- Vasily Fedorenko (ru)
- Vasily Ivanovich Fedorenko (ru)
- Vasily Mikhailovich Fedorenko (ru)
- Ivan Fedorenko (ru)
- Nikolai Fedorenko (ru)
- Stepan Fedorenko (ru)
- Dmitry Fedorin (ru)
- Ivan Fedorin (ru)
- Nikolai Fedorichev (ru)
- Vladimir Fedorkov (ru)
- Aleksandr Fyodorov (ru)
- Aleksey Zakarovich Fyodorov (ru)
- Aleksey Fyodorovich Fyodorov (twice)
- Arkady Fyodorov (ru)
- Boris Alekseyevich Fyodorov (ru)
- Boris Vasiliyevich Fyodorov (ru)
- Valentin Fyodorov (ru)
- Vasily Fyodorov (ru)
- Vladimir Fyodorov (ru)
- Yevgeny Konstantinovich Fyodorov
- Yevgeny Petrovich Fyodorov
- Ivan Andreyevich Fyodorov (ru)
- Ivan Vasilyevich Fyodorov (ru)
- Ivan Grigorievich Fyodorov (ru)
- Ivan Yevgrafovich Fyodorov (ru)
- Ivan Ilyich Fyodorov (ru)
- Ivan Mikhailovich Fyodorov (ru)
- Mikhail Tikhonovich Fyodorov (ru)
- Nikolai Grigorievich Fyodorov (ru)
- Nikolai Dmitrievich Fyodorov (ru)
- Nikolai Petrovich Fyodorov (ru)
- Pyotr Fyodorov (ru)
- Timofey Fyodorov (ru)
- Fyodor Fyodorov (ru)
- Ivan Fedorok (ru)
- Igor Fedorchuk (ru)
- Pavel Fedorchuk (ru)
- Mikhail Fedoseyev (ru)
- Ivan Fedosov (ru)
- Aleksandr Fedotov
- Aleksey Fedotov (ru)
- Andrey Fedotov (ru)
- Vasily Fedotov (Major-General)
- Vasily Fedotov (starshina) (ru)
- Ivan Fedotov (ru)
- Mikhail Fedotov (ru)
- Pyotr Ivanovich Fedotov (ru)
- Pyotr Fedotovich Fedotov (ru)
- Semyon Fedotov (ru)
- Pavel Fedotov (ru)
- Nadezhda Fedutenko
- Ivan Fedchenko (ru)
- Aleksey Fedyukov (ru)
- Aleksandr Fedyunin (ru)
- Ivan Fedyuninsky
- Ivan Fedyakov (ru)
- Sergey Fedyakov (ru)
- Milya Felzenshteyn (ru)
- Nikifor Fenichev (ru)
- Stepan Fenko (ru)
- Aleksey Feoktistov (ru)
- Konstantin Feoktistov
- Sergey Feoktistov (ru)
- Vasily Feofanov (ru)
- Vladimir Ferapontov (ru)
- Aleksey Fesenko (ru)
- Vasily Fesenko (ru)
- Mikhail Fesenko (ru)
- Ivan Fesin (twice)
- Anatoly Fetnyaev (ru)
- Ivan Fetnyaev (ru)
- Yakov Fefelov (ru)
- Pyotr Fefilov (ru)
- Yakov Fefilov (ru)
- Pyotr Feshchenko (ru)
- Valentin Figichev (ru)
- Vasily Filatenkov (ru)
- Aleksey Filatov (ru)
- Vasily Filatov (ru)
- Vyacheslav Filatov (ru)
- Grigory Filatov (ru)
- Ivan Filatev (ru)
- Ivan Filatov (ru)
- Vasily Filimonenkov (ru)
- Aleksandr Filimonov (ru)
- Ivan Filimonov (ru)
- Mikhail Filimonov (ru)
- Pyotr Filimonov (ru)
- Leonid Filin (ru)
- Mikhail Filin (ru)
- Leonid Filipenko (ru)
- Nikolai Filippenko (ru)
- Aleksandr Aleksandrovich Filippov (ru)
- Aleksandr Vasiliyevich Filippov (ru)
- Aleksandr Ivanovich Filippov (ru)
- Aleksey Filippov (ru)
- Vasily Filippov (ru)
- Georgy Ivanovich Filippov (ru)
- Georgy Nikoayevich Filippov (ru)
- Gordey Filippov (ru)
- Grigory Andreyevich Filippov (ru)
- Grigory Fyodorovich Filippov (ru)
- Ivan Filippov (ru)
- Nikolai Filippov (ru)
- Ivan Filippovsky (ru)
- Yevgeny Filipskykh (ru)
- Anatoly Filipchenko
- Sergey Filipchenkov (ru)
- Yuri Filipev (ru)
- Boris Filonenko (ru)
- Nikolai Filonenko (ru)
- Pyotr Filonenko (ru)
- Aleksandr Filonov (ru)
- Ivan Filonov (ru)
- Aleksandr Filosofov (ru)
- Ivan Filko (ru)
- Vasily Filkov (ru)
- Ivan Filchakov (ru)
- Nikolai Filchenkov (ru)
- Sergey Filchenkov (ru)
- Konstantin Finakov (ru)
- Ivan Finyutin (ru)
- Sergey Fionin (ru)
- Ivan Fionov (ru)
- Aleksandr Firsov (ru)
- Aleksandr Yakovlevich Firsov (ru)
- Ivan Ivanovich Firsov (ru)
- Ilya Petrovich Firsov (ru)
- Nikolai Aleksandrovich Firsov (ru)
- Nikolai Yakovlevich Firsov (ru)
- Pavel Firsov (ru)
- Israel Fisanovich
- Vasily Fishchuk (ru)
- Aleksey Fleyshman (ru)
- Aleksey Florenko (ru)
- Yan Fogel (ru)
- Vladimir Fogilev (ru)
- Aleksandr Fokin (ru)
- Andrey Fokin (ru)
- Afanasy Fokin (ru)
- Viktor Fokin (ru)
- Vladimir Fokin (ru)
- Grigory Fokin (ru)
- Dmitry Folomeyev (ru)
- Nikolai Fomenko (ru)
- Fyodor Fomenkov (ru)
- Vasily Fomin (ru)
- Vladimir Fomin (ru)
- Yevgeny Fomin (ru)
- Ivan Fomin (ru)
- Mikhail Sergeyevich Fomin (ru)
- Nikolai Ivanovich Fomin (ru)
- Nikolai Nikitovich Fomin (ru)
- Nikolai Petrovich Fomin (ru)
- Nikolai Sergeyevich Fomin (ru)
- Sergey Fomin (ru)
- Fyodor Fomin (ru)
- Yevgeny Fominykh (ru)
- Nikolai Fominykh (ru)
- Ivan Fomichev (ru)
- Konstantin Fomichev (ru)
- Mikhail Arsentevich Fomichyov (ru)
- Mikhail Georgievich Fomichyov (twice)
- Pavel Fomichev (ru)
- Pyotr Fomichev (ru)
- Fyodor Fomichev (ru)
- Klavdia Fomicheva
- Konstantin Fomchenkov (ru)
- Ivan Fonarev (ru)
- Nikolai Fonov (ru)
- Yakov Forzun (ru)
- Aleksey Fofanov (ru)
- Ivan Foshin (ru)
- Yefim Fradkov (ru)
- Yevgeny Frantsev (ru)
- Karl Franchuk (ru)
- Andrey Frolenkov (ru)
- Dmitry Frolikov (ru)
- Aleksandr Pavlovich Frolov (ru)
- Aleksandr Fyodorovich Frolov (ru)
- Aleksandr Filippovich Frolov (ru)
- Andrey Frolov (ru)
- Vasily Mikhailovich Frolov (ru)
- Vasily Sergeyevich Frolov (ru)
- Ivan Akimovich Frolov (ru)
- Ivan Vasiliyevich Frolov (ru)
- Ivan Nikolayevich Frolov (ru)
- Ivan Petrovich Frolov (ru)
- Ivan Timofeyevich Frolov (ru)
- Ivan Yakovlevich Frolov (ru)
- Ilya Frolov (ru)
- Konstantin Frolov (ru)
- Mikhail Alekseyevich Frolov (ru)
- Mikhail Ivanovich Frolov (lieutenant) (ru)
- Mikhail Frolov (sergeant) (ru)
- Mikhail Pavlovich Frolov (ru)
- Mikhail Fyodorovich Frolov (ru)
- Nikolai Mikhailovich Frolov (ru)
- Nikolai Nikiforovich Frolov (ru)
- Pavel Frolov (ru)
- Semyon Frolov (ru)
- Semyon Frolovsky (ru)
- Timur Frunze
- Aleksandr Fukovsky (ru)
- Aleksandr Furmanov (ru)
- Pavel Furs (ru)
- Ivan Fursenko (ru)
- Vasily Fursov (ru)
- Nikolai Fursov (ru)
- Vladimir Fufachev (ru)
