= Mikhail Ivasik =

- Native name: Михаил Адамович Ивасик
- Born: 1 May 1917; Petrushi village (located in present-day Mikhaylovsky District, Russia)
- Died: 18 August 1944 (aged 27) Madona, Nazi-occupied Latvia
- Allegiance: Soviet Union
- Branch: Red Army
- Service years: 1936–1944
- Rank: Captain
- Conflicts: Battle of Lake Khasan; World War II †
- Awards: Hero of the Soviet Union

Mikhail Adamovich Ivasik (Russian: Михаил Адамович Ивасик; 1 May 1917 — 18 August 1944) was a Soviet sniper in World War II who personally killed over 300 Nazis. He was posthumously awarded the title Hero of the Soviet Union for his feats.

== Early life ==
He was born on 1 May 1917 to a Russian (Note: Most sources say that he was ethnically Russian, including most of his award sheets and his entry in the Heroes of the Soviet Union encyclopedia. However, his award nomination sheet for the Medal "For Courage" indicated he was Ukrainian.) peasant family in Petrushi village. After graduating from seventh grade he worked as a store manager in the city of Ussuriysk. He joined the Red Army in 1936 and served in the Red Banner Amur Flotilla, taking part in the battles against Imperial Japan at lake Khasan.

== World War II ==
He began fighting on the Eastern Front of World War II in December 1941, originally fighting in the 713th Rifle Regiment. He helped develop the sniper movement on the Northwestern Front. By September 1942 he had killed 73 Nazis, including six Nazi snipers, for which he received his first award, the Medal "For Courage". He later graduated from courses for junior lieutenants in 1943, and became commander of a rifle company in the 380th Rifle Regiment. By late April 1943, he had personally killed 229 Nazi soldiers and officers, and by late July 1943 his tally reached 241 Nazis killed.

In November, his unit was deployed to the village of Velikiye Luki, where he fought in offensive and defensive battles, repelling against enemy counterattacks. During one battle, his company killed an estimated 50 Nazis and took an additional ten as prisoner. During a battle in January 1944 he attacked an enemy trench and took over a strategic height, and continued fighting in the battle after being wounded, and by that time he killed 284 Nazis. Later that year he especially distinguished himself in the Madona offensive operation in Latvia, leading his battalion in swamps behind enemy lines to attack retreating Nazi troops. He and his unit went on to seize control of important highway junctions and crossed a key river under intense enemy fire.

During the course of the war he was wounded four times. By the time he was killed in action on 18 August 1944 during a battle in Nazi-occupied Latvia, he had killed at least 320 Nazi soldiers and officers. He was posthumously awarded the title Hero of the Soviet Union on 24 March 1945 for skillful command of his unit and courage and heroism in the liberation of Latvia.

== Awards ==
- Hero of the Soviet Union (24 March 1945)
- Order of Lenin (24 March 1945)
- Order of the Red Banner (20 March 1944)
- Order of the Patriotic War 2nd class (10 December 1943)
- Order of the Red Star (27 April 1943)
- Medal "For Courage" (13 October 1942)
