= Shakir Gatiatullin =

Soviet Red Army senior sergeant (1916–1972)

Shakir Yusupovich Gatiatullin
- Native name: Шакир Йосоп улы Ғәтиәтуллин
- Born: 21 September 1916; Mullino, Ufa Governorate, Russian Empire
- Died: 21 July 1972 (aged 55) Oktyabrsky, Bashkir ASSR, Soviet Union
- Allegiance: Soviet Union
- Branch: Red Army
- Service years: 1941–1945
- Rank: Senior Sergeant
- Conflicts: World War II
- Awards: Hero of the Soviet Union; Order of the Red Star

Shakir Yusupovich Gatiatullin (Russian: Шакир Юсупович Гатиатуллин, Bashkir: Ғәтиәтуллин Шакир Йосоп улы; 21 September 1916 – July 21, 1972) was a senior sergeant in the Red Army who was awarded the title Hero of the Soviet Union in 1944.

== Biography ==
Gatiatullin was born on September 21 1916 in the village of Mullino (now within the city of Oktyabrsky, Bashkortostan) to a Bashkir peasant family. He received a primary education and initially worked on a collective farm, then in the drilling office No. 1 of the Tuymazyburneft (Tuymazi drilling oil) trust. In December 1941 he was called up for service in the Red Army by the Tuymazinsky District Military Commissariat of the Bashkir ASSR. On 26 April 1942, he arrived at the warfront. By September 1943, he was assistant commander of a saber platoon of the 58th Guards Cavalry Regiment of the 16th Guards Cavalry Division of the 7th Guards Cavalry Corps of the 61st Army of the Central Front. During the Battle of the Dnieper he distinguished himself in combat.

On 27 September 1943, Gatiatullin was one of the first in his platoon to cross the Dnieper near the village of Nivki in the Bragin district of the Gomel region of the Byelorussian SSR. In hand-to-hand combat, the platoon knocked the enemy out of the trench and entrenched themselves on the western bank of the river. Gatiatullin, on the orders of the platoon commander, crawled through the enemy defense line and destroyed a German machine-gun crew that was shelling the crossing upstream of the Dnieper. Firing from a captured machine gun, he successfully returned to the position of his platoon

By decree of the Presidium of the Supreme Soviet of the USSR "On conferring the title of Hero of the Soviet Union to generals, officers, sergeants and privates of the Red Army" dated 15 January 1944 for "exemplary performance of combat missions of the high command on the front of the fight against the German invaders and the courage and heroism shown at the same time" Guard Senior Sergeant Shakir Gatiatullin was awarded the title of Hero of the Soviet Union with the Order of Lenin and the Gold Star medal number 3011.

Demobilized after the end of the war, he worked as a driller at Tuymazyburneft drilling office No. 1, then as a senior mechanic in the drilling department. He died on 21 July 1972 and was buried in Oktyabrsky.

== Awards ==
- Hero of the Soviet Union (1944)
- Order of the Red Star

== Recognition ==
- A street in the village of Mullino was named after Gatiatullin, and his bust was erected in the square of school No. 11 in the city of Oktyabrsky.
- In 2005, in the city of Tuymazy, on the alley of heroes in honor of the Heroes of the Soviet Union, a bust of Gatiatullin Shakir Yusupovich was erected.

== Books ==
- пред. ред. коллегии И. Н. Шкадов (1987). Герои Советского Союза: Краткий биографический словарь. Vol. 1 (100.000 экз ed.). Москва: Воениздат. p. 911.
- И. П. Шамякин (head of the editorial board) (1984). Навечно в сердце народном. 65 000 (3 ed.). Минск: Белорусская советская энциклопедия. p. 116.
- Подвиги их — бессмертны. Уфа: Китап. 2000.
- Славные сыны Башкирии. Vol. 1. Уфа. 1965.
