= Nikolai Zelenov =

Soviet aviator (1917–1944)

Nikolai Andrianovich Zelenov
- Николай Андрианович Зеленов
- Born: 5 September 1917; Popovka, Krasnoselsky District, Kostroma Oblast, Russian Empire
- Died: 29 June 1944 (aged 26); Vyborgsky District, Leningrad Oblast, Russian SFSR, Soviet Union
- Military career
- Allegiance: Soviet Union
- Branch: Soviet Air Force
- Service years: 1936—1944
- Rank: Captain
- Conflicts: World War II; Winter War; Eastern Front
- Awards: Hero of the Soviet Union

Nikolai Andrianovich Zelenov (Russian: Николай Андрианович Зеленов; 6 September 1917 – 29 June 1944) was a Soviet fighter pilot and flying ace during World War II who was credited with 24 solo and nine shared aerial victories.

== Early life ==
Zelenov was born on 5 September 1917 in the village of Popovka, located within present-day Kostroma Oblast. After finishing seven years of school and land management college, he worked as a land surveyor. In 1936, Zelenov was called up to serve in the Red Army. In 1937, he graduated from the Lugansk Military Aviation School.

== Military career ==
After graduation from flight school, he was assigned to the 154th Fighter Aviation Regiment within the Air Force of the Leningrad Military District in 1938. The regiment was equipped with I-16s and I-153 aircraft. During this time, he flew 10 sorties in the Winter War, and received the Medal "For Courage". In 1940, he was promoted to senior lieutenant and became a member of the Communist Party of Soviet Union.

Following the German invasion of Soviet Union in June 1941, Zelanov's unit was based near Leningrad. Most of their aircraft were transferred to other units. They were now equipped with MiG-3 fighters and Zelenov had to master in flying the aircraft by himself. On 15 August 1941, he scored his first shared aerial victory, when he and his wingmen shot down a Junkers Ju 88. Zelenov scored his solo aerial victory on 12 October 1941.

In the fall of 1941, the 154th Fighter Aviation Regiment was relocated to the 27th Reserve Aviation Regiment near Vologda, where the pilots underwent training on the P-40 Tomahawks, which arrived to USSR via Lend-Lease from the United States. On 26 November 1941, the Zelenov's two-squadron regiment relocated to the Podborovye airfield and began escorting transport aircraft, during the siege of Leningrad.

While flying the P-40 on 30 March 1942, he shot down four enemy aircraft, which includes two shared aerial victories. He shot down two more solo aerial victories on 30 April 1942. He later flew Yak-7s and Yak-9. By July 1942, he had already scored 17 aerial victories, while flying 382 missions. Subsequently, he commanded a squadron in the 14th Guards Leningrad Red Banner Fighter Aviation Regiment. By the decree of the Presidium of the Supreme Soviet of the USSR of 10 February 1943, Zelenov was awarded the title of Hero of the Soviet Union with the award of the Order of Lenin.

On 23 March 1943, together with his wingman, he fought against eight enemy aircraft, during which he managed to score two aerial victories. On April 3, while assisting a wingman, Zelenov shot down one enemy plane and damaged the other. On 7 March 1944, six fighters under the command of Zelenov flew to escort a squadron of dive bombers. When approaching the city of Tartu, they managed to repel an attack by enemy fighters, during which they managed to shoot down seven enemy planes.

On 29 June 1944, Zelenov died during a training flight, when his Yak-9 crashed near the city of Vyborg while engaging in a mock dogfight. He is buried at the Shuvalovskoe Cemetery in Leningrad.

His final tally accumulated through the course of approximately 600 sorties and 117 dogfights officially stands at 24 solo and nine shared shootdowns.

== Awards and honors ==
- Hero of the Soviet Union
- Order of Lenin
- Order of the Red Banner, twice
- Order of the Patriotic War, 1st class, twice
- Medal "For Courage"
- Medal "For the Defence of Leningrad"

A street in Volgorechensk was named in honor of Zelenov. A Mikoyan MiG-29 of the Russian Air Force was also named in honor of him.
