= Umar Khabek =

Red Army captain

- Born: 10 September 1921; Maly Zelenchuk, Khabezsky District, Karachay-Cherkess AO, Russian SFSR, Soviet Union
- Died: 10 April 1945 (aged 23); Vienna, Austria
- Military career
- Allegiance: Soviet Union
- Branch: Red Army (Infantry)
- Service years: 1939–1945
- Rank: Guards Captain
- Units: 301st Guards Rifle Regiment; 100th Guards Rifle Division; 9th Guards Army; 3rd Ukrainian Front
- Conflicts: World War II
- Awards: Hero of the Soviet Union; Order of Lenin; Order of Alexander Nevsky; Order of the Patriotic War 1st class

Umar Khabek (Kabardian: Хьабэч Хьэмыд ыкъуэ Умэр; Russian: Умар Хамидович Хабеков; 10 September 1921 – 10 April 1945) was a Red Army Guards captain, commander of a rifle battalion in the 301st Guards Rifle Regiment of the 100th Guards Rifle Division (9th Guards Army, 3rd Ukrainian Front), and a posthumous Hero of the Soviet Union.

== Biography ==
Umar Khabekov was born on 10 September 1921 in the aul of Maly Zelenchuk (now in the Khabezsky District of Karachay-Cherkessia) to a peasant family. He was of Circassian ethnicity. Before the war, he studied at a pedagogical school.

He was drafted into the Red Army in 1939 and fought on the front lines of World War II starting in June 1941. In 1942, he became a member of the All-Union Communist Party (Bolsheviks).

As the commander of a rifle battalion in the 301st Guards Rifle Regiment (100th Guards Rifle Division, 9th Guards Army, 3rd Ukrainian Front), Guards Captain Khabekov distinguished himself during the Vienna offensive. On 3 April 1945, while leading his battalion in the vanguard of the regiment during the battles for the Austrian capital of Vienna, he liberated up to 500 Soviet and 400 French prisoners of war. On the night of 9 April 1945, his battalion eliminated up to 200 enemy soldiers and officers, captured around 150 German troops, and seized four anti-aircraft guns and six machine guns.

On 10 April 1945, Guards Captain Khabekov's rifle battalion was among the first in the regiment to cross the Donaukanal (Danube Canal). He was killed in action during the fierce fighting for the bridgehead. He is buried at the Vienna Central Cemetery, where a monument was erected on his grave. The brave battalion commander had been previously nominated for the title of Hero of the Soviet Union in 1944 and 1945.

Following a petition by Umar Temirov, a deputy of the Supreme Soviet of the RSFSR, Guards Captain Umar Khamidovich Khabekov was posthumously awarded the title of Hero of the Soviet Union by a decree of the President of the USSR on 11 December 1990 "for courage and bravery displayed during the Great Patriotic War of 1941–1945."

== Awards ==
- Hero of the Soviet Union (11 December 1990)
- Order of Lenin (11 December 1990)
- Order of Alexander Nevsky (23 July 1944; originally nominated for the title of Hero of the Soviet Union)
- Order of the Patriotic War 1st class (7 June 1945; originally nominated posthumously for the title of Hero of the Soviet Union)

== Memorials ==
- Secondary School No. 8 in the city of Ramenskoye, Moscow Oblast, is named after Umar Khabekov.
- Streets in the auls of Khabez and Maly Zelenchuk in Karachay-Cherkessia bear his name.
- On 6 May 2005, an Alley of Heroes was opened at the Victory Park memorial complex in Cherkessk, the capital of the Karachay-Cherkess Republic. Busts of Heroes of the Soviet Union and the Russian Federation were erected there, including one of U. K. Khabekov.
- In the city of Ramenskoye (where the 100th Guards Airborne Division was formed), a street is named in honor of the Paratrooper Heroes.

== See also ==
- List of Heroes of the Soviet Union
