= List of Moldovan Heroes of the Soviet Union =

The following is a list of Heroes of the Soviet Union who were born or lived in the Moldavian SSR or were of Moldovan ethnicity.

== List ==
Name	Date of awarding	Notes
Sergei Bolgarin	24 March 1945	
Vladimir Bochkovsky	26 April 1944	
Pyotr Vershigora	7 August 1944	
Yuri Dobrovolsky	22 June 1956	
Fyodor Zharchinsky	27 June 1945	
Akim Karpenko	13 March 1944	
Ivan Koval	26 October 1943	
Stephan Kolesnichenko	2 September 1943	
Alexey Krasilov	15 May 1946	
Nikita Lebedenko	23 September 1944	
Shabsa Mashkautsan	29 April 1945	
Semyon Osadchy	31 December 1936	
Mikhail Pavlotsky	16 October 1943	
Mikhail Plugarev	17 November 1943	
Sergei Poletsky	5 May 1945	
Anatoly Sokolov	12 April 1942	
Ion Soltys	10 April 1945	A monument in his honor was unveiled in May 2021 in the presence of former Moldovan president Igor Dodon and parliament speaker Zinaida Greceanîi.; In the house where he was born, a house-museum in his honor was inaugurated in 1958.; A monument to him was erected in his native village on January 26, 1965.
Grigory Sorokin	31 May 1945	
Yevgeny Konstantinovich Fyodorov	22 March 1938	
Nikolay Frolov	24 March 1944	
Alexander Frumkin	27 May 1976	The Russian Academy of Sciences' Frumkin Institute of Physical Chemistry and Electrochemistry is named after him.
Georgy Chernienko	24 July 1943	
Pavel Shcherbinko	25 October 1943	
