= Ivan Likhobabin =

Soviet fighter pilot (1916–1994)

Ivan Dmitrievich Likhobabin
- Иван Дмитриевич Лихобабин
- Born: 27 January [O.S. 14 January] 1916; Shiryaevo, Voronezh Governorate, Russian Empire
- Died: 26 April 1994 (aged 78); Odintsovo, Moscow oblast, Russian Federation
- Military career
- Allegiance: Soviet Union
- Branch: Soviet Air Force
- Service years: 1941—1960
- Rank: Colonel
- Conflicts: World War II
- Awards: Hero of the Soviet Union

Ivan Dmitrievich Likhobabin (Russian: Иван Дмитриевич Лихобабин; 27 January [O.S. 14 January] 1916 — 26 April 1994) was a Soviet fighter pilot during World War II. Awarded the title Hero of the Soviet Union on 26 October 1944 for his victories, by the end of the war his tally stood at an estimated 32 solo and seven shared shootdowns.
