= Oʻrinbek Yoqubov =

Soviet Red Army officer (1917–1989)

O‘rinbek Yoqubov
- Born: 10 May [O.S. 27 April] 1917; Yakhtan, Emirate of Bukhara (now in Sughd Region, Tajikistan)
- Died: 8 March 1989 (aged 71); Leninabad, Tajik SSR, USSR (now Khujand, Tajikistan)
- Military career
- Allegiance: Soviet Union
- Branch: Red Army
- Service years: 1939–1945
- Rank: junior lieutenant
- Conflicts: World War II
- Awards: Hero of the Soviet Union

O‘rinbek Yoqubov (Note: His name is spelled a variety of different ways such as Urumbek Yakibov (Урумбек Якибов), Urumbek Yakubov (Урумбек Якубов), Urunbek Yakubov, Urumbek Yakibuv, etc. The writing of his name in his party card as Якибов (Yakibov) instead of Якубов (Yakubov) was a typo.) (10 May [O.S. 27 April] 1917 — 8 May 1989) was an officer in the 248th Rifle Regiment of the Red Army during World War II who was awarded the title Hero of the Soviet Union on 22 February 1944. (Note: Some modern sources mistakenly indicate that he was awarded the title in 1945.) He is distantly related to President of Uzbekistan Shavkat Mirziyoyev.

== Early life ==
Yoqubov was born on 10 May [O.S. 27 April] 1917 to an Uzbek (Note: Most sources including his official award sheet and the encyclopedia of Heroes of the Soviet Union indicate he was Uzbek, although some Tajik sources claim he was Tajik.) peasant family in Yakhtan village. After completing five grades of school he worked as a driver on a collective farm before joining the Red Army in 1939. He became a member of the Communist Party in 1943.

== World War II ==
Having entered the Red Army in 1939, Yoqubov was stationed in Yerevan as commander of a mortar company in the 248th Infantry Regiment. In October the regiment was deployed to the warfront, and initially headed for Moscow, but diverted to the Rostov-on-Don area en route. The unit participated in the liberation of the city in November before positioning itself on the Mius River before retreating to the Caucasus. By 1943 their division was fighting in Krasnodar. During the battle for height 509.9, Yoqubov hit enemy targets with his mortar, enabling Soviet infantry to advance. He continued to press forward in other battles in Krasnodar, and was wounded on 5 February 1943 but continued to fight, for which he was awarded the Medal "For Courage". However, it was during the battle for the Dnieper that he distinguished himself, for which he was awarded the title Hero of the Soviet Union. On the night of 26–27 September 1943, he and his crew got on one of the first boats to cross the river in the area of Soshinovka. Upon reaching the shore he set up his mortar and began opening fire on enemy targets. He noticed that Nazis were starting to install a canon at a point 200 meters away, so he fired upon it, and destroyed it on the first shot. As result the Nazis counterattacked, trying to drive them into the river, but Yoqubov fought back, killing five Nazi soldiers in hand-to-hand combat and capturing some of their equipment and using it against them. Over the course of three days he led his crew in repulsing 15 counterattacks, inflicting heavy losses on the Nazis. For his actions in the battle he was awarded the title Hero of the Soviet Union on 22 February 1944. After graduating from junior lieutenant courses later that year he returned to combat and participated in the Sandomierz-Silesian operation. On 24 January 1945 he protected advancing infantry with fire from his mortars, allowing them to cross the river on ice and seize the bridgehead. As they continued to advance he continued to take out enemy targets, killing 20 enemy soldiers. For doing so he was awarded the Order of the Red Star.

== Postwar ==
After the end of the war he entered the reserve and moved to Leninabad. There, he graduated from the Higher Party School and worked as director of a glass container factory and director of a coal base. He died on 8 March 1989 and was buried in the Muslim cemetery of Dushanbe.

== Awards ==
- Hero of the Soviet Union
- Order of Lenin
- Order of the Patriotic War 1st class
- Order of the Red Star
- Medal "For Courage"
- campaign and jubilee medals
