= Grigory Levin =

Soviet Army colonel (1902–1983)

- Григорий Михайлович Левин
- Born: 10 January 1902; Antsir, Kansky Uyezd, Yeniseysk Governorate, Russian Empire
- Died: 26 January 1983 (aged 81); Barnaul, Altai Krai, Soviet Union
- Military career
- Allegiance: Soviet Union
- Branch: Red Army; Soviet Army
- Service years: 1921–32; 1941–54
- Rank: Colonel
- Unit: 37th Guards Rifle Division
- Conflicts: World War II; Battles of Rzhev; Battle of the Dnieper; Operation Bagration; East Pomeranian Offensive; Battle of Berlin
- Awards: Hero of the Soviet Union; Order of Lenin; Order of the Red Banner (2x); Order of Suvorov, 3rd class; Order of Alexander Nevsky; Order of the Red Star; Medal for Battle Merit

Grigory Mikhailovich Levin (Russian: Григорий Михайлович Левин; 10 January 1902 – 26 January 1983) was a Soviet Army colonel and a Hero of the Soviet Union. Levin served as a Red Army officer in the late 1920s and fought in the Sino-Soviet conflict of 1929. He was demobilized in 1932 and worked as a statistician. Levin was called up again after the German invasion of the Soviet Union. He served with the 385th Rifle Division and the 354th Rifle Division, in which he led a regiment. He was seriously wounded in January 1944 and upon recovery became a regimental commander in the 37th Guards Rifle Division. Levin was awarded the title Hero of the Soviet Union for his leadership of the regiment in the Battle of Berlin. Levin retired from the army in 1954 and became chairman of the Altai Krai DOSAAF.

== Early life and Interwar ==
Levin was born on 10 January 1902 to a peasant family of Russian ethnicity in the village of Antsir in Yeniseysk Governorate. He graduated from seven classes in 1919. Levin was drafted into the Red Army in 1921. In December 1922, he graduated from the 26th Krasnoyarsk Infantry School. He became a junior commander in the 3rd Shock Regiment of the Pacific Corps at Vladivostok. In 1923, Levin entered the Vladivostok Infantry School, graduating in 1926. He became a platoon commander and machine gun company commander in the 76th Rifle Regiment of the 26th Rifle Division at Nikolsk-Ussurisky. He fought in the Sino-Soviet conflict of 1929. Levin was demobilized in April 1932.

Levin lived in Nikolsk-Ussurisky for a short period. He worked as a statistician at the Oil and Fat Industry Trust. From August 1932 to January 1935, he lived in Barnaul, where he worked at the Locomotive-Car Repair Plant. Levin moved to Chirchiq, where he worked at the Chirchiqstroy Construction Trust.

== World War II ==
Levin was called up on 5 September 1941. He fought in combat from November. Levin became assistant chief of logistics for the 1266th Rifle Regiment of the 385th Rifle Division. He became a battalion commander in the regiment, commander of the 1270th Rifle Regiment in the division, battalion commander in the 1268th Rifle Regiment, commander of the 1266th Rifle Regiment, and lastly became a battalion commander in the 1268th Rifle Regiment again. Between February and September 1942 Levin served with the division during the Battles of Rzhev. In September he was sent to the Vystrel courses. After completing the courses in December he became commander of the 1201st Rifle Regiment of the 354th Rifle Division.

The division was part of the 20th Army, in the Rzhev-Vyazma sector. In 1943, Levin became a Communist Party of the Soviet Union member. In February 1943, the division was transferred to the Central Front in the area of Komarichi. During March, the division fought in heavy fighting to take the village, but was repulsed. On 29 May 1943, Levin was awarded the Order of Alexander Nevsky for his actions. During the summer of 1943 the division defended positions in the Kursk Bulge, but was not directly involved in the Battle of Kursk. In August the division was transferred south of Sevsk. Between 26 August and 30 September, Levin fought in the Chernigov-Pripyat Offensive. During the offensive, the division advanced west through Bryansk Oblast, Sumy Oblast, and Chernigov Oblast. The division crossed the Sev River, Desna River, Snov River, and the Sozh River. In October, the division crossed the Dnieper near Loyew.

From 10 to 30 November, the division fought in the Gomel-Rechitsa Offensive. The division advanced northwest, ending the operation on the line of Ozarichi and Parichi. From 8 January Levin fought in the Kalinkovichi-Mozyr Offensive. The division broke through German defenses, captured Kalinkovichi, and eliminated German troops around Ozarichi. On 20 January the division captured Ozarichi. On the same day Levin was seriously wounded and sent to the hospital. For his actions Levin was awarded the Order of the Red Banner on 5 March 1944.

After recovering in May 1944, Levin became commander of the 37th Guards Rifle Division's 109th Guards Rifle Regiment. He led the regiment in Operation Bagration in the summer of 1944. Between 24 and 29 June, the division fought in the Bobruysk Offensive. On 28 June the division captured Osipovichi. Baranovichi was captured on 8 July, and Slonim two days later. On 15 July Levin received a second Order of the Red Banner. From 18 July, the division fought in the Lublin–Brest Offensive. On 21 July the division reached the Polish border and crossed the Western Bug. Until the end of August the division fought in the area between the Western Bug and the Narew. In early September the division crossed the Narew at Pułtusk. Until January 1945 the division fought to expand the bridgehead. On 7 December 1944 Levin was awarded the Order of Suvorov 3rd class.

From 14 January 1945, the division fought in the Mlawa-Elbing Offensive. The division advanced out of the bridgehead towards Graudenz and Bromberg. The division fought in the East Prussian Offensive from 10 February. The division captured Graudenz on 6 March. After crossing the Schwarzwasser River, the division reached the Danzig approaches. From 26 March, Levin and his regiment fought in the storming of Danzig, which was captured after heavy fighting four days later. On 6 April the army began a march to the west towards Stettin, reaching the Oder on 13 April. From 16 April, Levin fought in the Berlin Offensive. Between 14 and 19 April Levin organized the construction of equipment necessary to cross the Oder, according to division commander Kuzma Grebennik. The regiment crossed the river on the night of 19 to 20 April. The regiment's assault battalion held the bridgehead against heavy artillery and mortar fire as well as counterattacks in marshy ground which made digging it difficult. In the morning, the rest of the regiment crossed and captured a brick factory. By the end of the day the regiment was on the Berlin-Stettin Highway. From 20 to 22 April the regiment was reported by Grebennik to have repulsed 26 counterattacks. On 29 June 1945 Levin was awarded the title Hero of the Soviet Union and the Order of Lenin for his actions.

== Postwar ==
Levin retired from the Soviet Army in 1954. He lived in Chirchiq and then Barnaul. He became chairman of DOSAAF in Altai Krai. Levin died on 26 January 1983.
