= Alim Baisultanov =

Soviet fighter ace (1919–1943)

Alim Yusufovich Baisultanov
- Алим Юсуфович Байсултанов
- Born: 15 May 1919; Yanikoy village, RSFSR located in present-day Chegemsky District, Kabardino-Balkar Republic, Russian Federation
- Died: 28 September 1943 (aged 24); Gulf of Finland, Leningrad oblast, USSR
- Military career
- Allegiance: Soviet Union
- Branch: Soviet Air Force
- Service years: 1937–1943
- Rank: Captain
- Unit: 4th Guards Fighter Aviation Regiment
- Conflicts: World War II; Winter War; Eastern Front
- Awards: Hero of the Soviet Union

Alim Yusufovich Baisultanov (Russian: Алим Юсуфович Байсултанов; 15 May 1919 – 28 September 1943) was a Balkar flying ace in the Soviet Air Forces and Hero of the Soviet Union. Less than a year after he was killed in action, his entire family was deported to Central Asia because of their Balkar ethnicity.

== Early life ==
Baisultanov was born on 15 May 1919 to a large Balkar peasant family in Yanikoy village. After completing pedagogical school in 1937 and training at an aeroclub, he entered the Navy, graduating from the Yeisk Naval Aviation School in 1939 before seeing combat for the first time in the Winter War.

== World War II ==
During the early phase of the German invasion of the Soviet Union, Baisultanov was deployed as part of the 13th Fighter Aviation Regiment, in which he fought in the battles for Tallinn, Hanko, and defended the Road of Life. Before the end of June 1941 he gained his first aerial victory – the shared kill of a Fokker D.XXI. His first solo victory took place over Tallinn nearly two months later when he took out a Ju 88. He racked up two more solo kills and one shared kill by mid September 1941, after which he went several months without any aerial victories; then in March and April 1942 he began to rapidly increase his tally, though most of his claims involved shared kills. Nevertheless, he became an ace on 4 April 1942 after shooting down a Ju 87 dive bomber – his fifth solo kill. In June 1942 he was nominated for the title Hero of the Soviet Union for having flown 277 sorties, gaining 5 solo and 13 shared shootdowns. The title was awarded on 23 October 1942. However, his tally remained at that number since he was sent for squadron commander training in summer 1943. By the time he returned to his regiment it had been honored with the guards designation and renamed as the 4th Guards Fighter Aviation Regiment. Shortly after the unit received the new La-5, he was shot down over the Gulf of Finland while on a mission escorting a group of attack aircraft to Seskar Island. Not long after his death, his family was deported to the Osh oblast in Central Asia because of their Balkar ethnicity. His parents and two of his brothers soon perished in the harsh conditions of exile soon after the deportation.

== Awards ==
- Hero of the Soviet Union
- Order of Lenin
- Two Order of the Red Banner
