= Vasily Yefremov =

Soviet air squadron commander (1915–1990)

Vasily Sergeyevich Yefremov
- Василий Сергеевич Ефремов
- Born: 14 January [O.S. 1 January] 1915; Tsaritsyn, Russian Empire
- Died: 19 August 1990 (aged 75); Kiev, Soviet Union
- Military career
- Allegiance: Soviet Union
- Branch: Soviet Air Force
- Rank: Colonel
- Unit: 10th Guards Bomber Aviation Regiment
- Conflicts: World War II; Winter War; Eastern Front
- Awards: Hero of the Soviet Union (twice)

Vasily Sergeyevich Yefremov (Russian: Василий Сергеевич Ефремов; 14 January [O.S. 1 January] 1915 – 19 August 1990) was a squadron commander in the 10th Guards Bomber Aviation Regiment of the Soviet Air Force during World War II who was twice awarded the title Hero of the Soviet Union.

== Early life ==
Yefremov was born on 14 January [O.S. 1 January] 1915 to a working-class Russian family in Tsaritsyn. Having finished his initial education in 1929 after completing his seventh grade of school, he went on to study at a trade school, which he graduated from in 1932. He then worked as an electrician in Stalingrad until entering the military in 1934. After graduating from the Stalingrad Military Aviation School of Pilots in November 1937 he became a pilot in the 33rd High-speed Bomber Aviation Regiment, which was later renamed to the 10th Guards Bomber Aviation Regiment. There he flew several sorties on the SB bomber during the Winter War.

== World War II ==
By the time Nazi Germany invaded the Soviet Union, Yefremov had already been promoted to flight commander. In the early days of the war, he flew on the obsolete SB bomber. Despite that, during his first sortie in June 1941, his navigator shot down an enemy fighter; however, on 10 July he was shot down over Korostyshev. Forced to bail out in parachutes, he and his crew eventually made it back to friendly territory, although the navigator was wounded. By the start of September Yefremov had flown a total of 39 sorties. During the Battle of Stalingrad he flew nearly 200 sorties, often making several in one day - resulting in the destruction of five trains, 15 cargo vehicles, 11 aircraft, and other equipment. During his bombing of a crossing on the Don river on 23 August 1942 he remained over the target area for three hours despite heavy counter-fire and persistently attacked troops that were attempting to rebuild the crossing. That night he flew three sorties. In November that year alone he flew 24 sorties and took out ten tanks and five trains in addition to other targets. On 3 February 1943, he was nominated for the title Hero of the Soviet Union for having flown 293 sorties; by then he was a squadron commander. The title was awarded on 1 May 1943.

While flying mostly in the American-made A-20B he flew in the battles for Donbas, Melitopol, and Crimea, during which he was hit by enemy fire three times, making one emergency landing in the SB bomber and two in the A-20B. After having totaled 320 sorties he was nominated for a second gold star, becoming a double hero on 24 August 1943. By the time he left the front in fall 1944 to attend the Monino Air Force Academy he had reached a total of 350 sorties flying SB, Ar-2, and A-20 bombers, during which his crew shot down four enemy aircraft.

== Postwar ==
After graduating from the academy in 1949 he became deputy commander of the 277th Bomber Aviation Regiment. From July 1950 to March 1953 he served as the deputy commander of the 668th Bomber Aviation Regiment, after which he became the senior flight inspector for the bomber aviation units of the 48th Air Army, but in August that year, he transferred to the 132nd Bomber Aviation Division. From January to June 1954 he returned to the 277th Regiment as deputy commander, during which he was demoted from lieutenant colonel to major. In June 1954 he began working at the 4th Center for Combat Employment, where he started out as a senior flight inspector but went on to work as a test pilot and research officer. After retiring in 1960 he was honored with lighting the eternal flame at a memorial to fallen soldiers and wrote a memoir. He died in Kiev on 19 August 1990 but was buried in Mamayev Kurgan.

== Awards ==
- Twice Hero of the Soviet Union (1 May 1943 and 24 August 1943)
- Two Order of Lenin (30 August 1942 and 1 May 1943)
- Order of the Red Banner (6 November 1941)
- Two Order of the Patriotic War 1st class (21 May 1944 and 11 March 1985)
- Two Order of the Red Star (6 November 1941 and 15 November 1950)
