= List of Tajik Heroes of the Soviet Union =

This is a list of people awarded the title Hero of the Soviet Union who were of Tajik ethnicity. It does not include non-Tajik residents of the Tajik SSR who were awarded the title.

- Domullo Azizov ru
- Nabi Akramov ru
- Safar Amirshoev ru
- Fatulla Ahmedov ru
- Vildan Habiev ru
- Alim Hakimov ru
- Ismail Hamzaliev ru
- Negmat Karabaev ru
- Haidar Kasimov ru
- Hozi Kinzhaev ru
- Tohtasin Mirzaev ru
- Tuichi Nazarov ru
- Azim Rakhimov ru
- Rakhimbai Rakhmatov ru
- Amirali Saidbekov ru
- Irgash Sharipov ru
- Ismat Sharipov ru
- Saidqul Turdyev ru
