= Nikolai Ignatev (pilot) =

Fighter pilot and flying ace of the Soviet Air Force

- Николай Петрович Игнатьев
- Born: 16 December 1917; Gory, Saint Petersburg Governorate, RSFSR
- Died: 4 August 1994 (aged 76); Saint Petersburg, Russian Federation
- Military career
- Allegiance: Soviet Union
- Branch: Soviet Air Force
- Service years: 1938—1969
- Rank: Colonel
- Conflicts: World War II
- Awards: Hero of the Soviet Union

Nikolai Petrovich Ignatev (Russian: Николай Петрович Игнатьев; 16 December 1917 — 4 August 1994) was a Soviet fighter pilot during World War II. Awarded the title Hero of the Soviet Union on 13 April 1944 for his initial victories, he went on to achieve a final tally of 22 solo and 11 (or possibly 13) shared shootdowns.
