= List of Baltic Heroes of the Soviet Union =

This is a list of people of Baltic ethnicities who were awarded the title Hero of the Soviet Union. It does not include non-Baltic peoples, such as Russians and Ukrainians, who resided in the Baltic republics.

== Estonian ==
- August Allik ru
- Aleksander Viljamson ru
- Genrikh Gendreus ru
- Helene Kullman
- Jakob Kunder ru
- Ludvig Kurist ru
- Joosep Laar ru
- Arnold Meri
- Arnold Papel ru
- Endel Puusepp
- Albert Repson ru

== Latvian ==
- Pols Armāns
- Jānis Bērziņš ru
- Jānis Vilhelms ru
- Aleksandr Gruzdin ru
- Peteris Zudov ru
- Ivans Krūmiņš ru
- Otomārs Oškalns
- Peteris Pumpurs
- Pavel Purin ru
- Jānis Rainbergs ru
- Vilis Samsons ru
- Imants Sudmalis
- Jānis Fogelis ru

== Lithuanian ==
- Juozas Aleksonis ru
- Stanislovas Apyvala ru
- Vaclovas Bernotėnas ru
- Jonas Blaževičius ru
- Hubertas Borisa ru
- Alfonsas Čeponis ru
- Boleslovas Gėgžnas ru
- Jonas Kostin ru
- Marytė Melnikaitė
- Viktoras Poznyak ru
- Stasys Šeinauskas ru
- Yakov Smushkevich (twice)
- Bronius Urbanavičiusru
- Stanislovas Vaupšas ru
- Juozas Vitas
- Viktoras Jacenevičius ru
