= Ivan Laveykin =

- Иван Павлович Лавейкин
- Born: 2 August 1921; Smolensk, RSFSR
- Died: 2 December 1986 (aged 65); Moscow, USSR
- Military career
- Allegiance: Soviet Union
- Branch: Soviet Air Force
- Service years: 1939—1986
- Rank: General-major of Aviation
- Conflicts: World War II
- Awards: Hero of the Soviet Union

Ivan Pavlovich Laveykin (Russian: Иван Павлович Лавейкин; 2 August 1921 — 2 December 1986) was a Soviet fighter pilot during World War II. Awarded the title Hero of the Soviet Union on 24 August 1943 for his initial victories, he went on to achieve a final tally of 24 solo shootdowns.
