= Ivan Filippov =

Russian writer

Ivan Borisovich Filippov (Иван Борисович Филиппов) is a Russian writer residing (as of January 2024) in Tbilisi, Georgia.

== Novel ==
He is the author of the novel Mouse, published by Freedom Letters. The novel tells the story of a pink mouse that escaped from a facility developing an immortality serum for Russian president Vladimir Putin. Its escape in Moscow causes an apocalypse, many people die (Margarita Simonyan and Patriarch Kirill of Moscow, among others), and others turn into zombies.

Roskomnadzor, the Russian federal executive censoring agency, recognized that the book contains passages and material to "destabilize the socio-political situation in Russia", and demanded the removal of the book from sale in 2024. The prosecutor's office also labeled Filippov as a foreign agent".

Filippov satirically speaks out against the Russian invasion of Ukraine on his Telegram channel.
