= Zubai Utyagulov =

Soviet private (1913–1943)

- Native name: Zubai Tukhvatovich Utyagulov
- Born: 1913 village Bakeyevo, Bashkir ASSR USSR
- Died: 1943 (aged 29–30)
- Allegiance: Soviet Union
- Branch: 44th Guards rifle division
- Service years: 1942–1943
- Rank: private
- Conflicts: World War II
- Awards: Hero of the Soviet Union; Order of Lenin

Zubai Tukhvatovich Utyagulov (Russian: Зуба́й Тухва́тович Утягу́лов, Bashkir: Зөбәй Төхвәт улы Үтәғолов; 15 September 1913 - 15 January 1943) was a soldier in the Red Army during World War II who was posthumously awarded the title Hero of the Soviet Union.

== Biography ==
Utyagulov was born on 15 September 1913 in the village of Bakeevo (now the Beloretsk district of Bashkortostan) to a Bashkir peasant family. He studied in the village of Makarovo, Makarovsky district, at the Makarov school of the second stage (which merged with the school of the first stage and became the Makarov secondary school).

In August 1942, he was drafted by the Meleuzovsky District Military Commissariat of the Bashkir ASSR into the Red Army, and was put into active duty in November that year.

Zubai Utyagulov distinguished himself on 15 January 1943 in the battles for railway area in Donskoy (now the Krasnovka station of the Tarasovsky district, Rostov oblast), where he was killed in action. He was buried in a mass grave at Krasnovka station.

By the decree of the Presidium of the Supreme Soviet of the USSR of March 31, 1943 "On conferring the title of Hero of the Soviet Union to commanders and privates of the Red Army" for "exemplary performance of combat missions of command on the front of the struggle against the German invaders and the courage and heroism shown at the same time" was awarded posthumously the title of Hero of the Soviet Union and the Order of Lenin.

== Memory ==
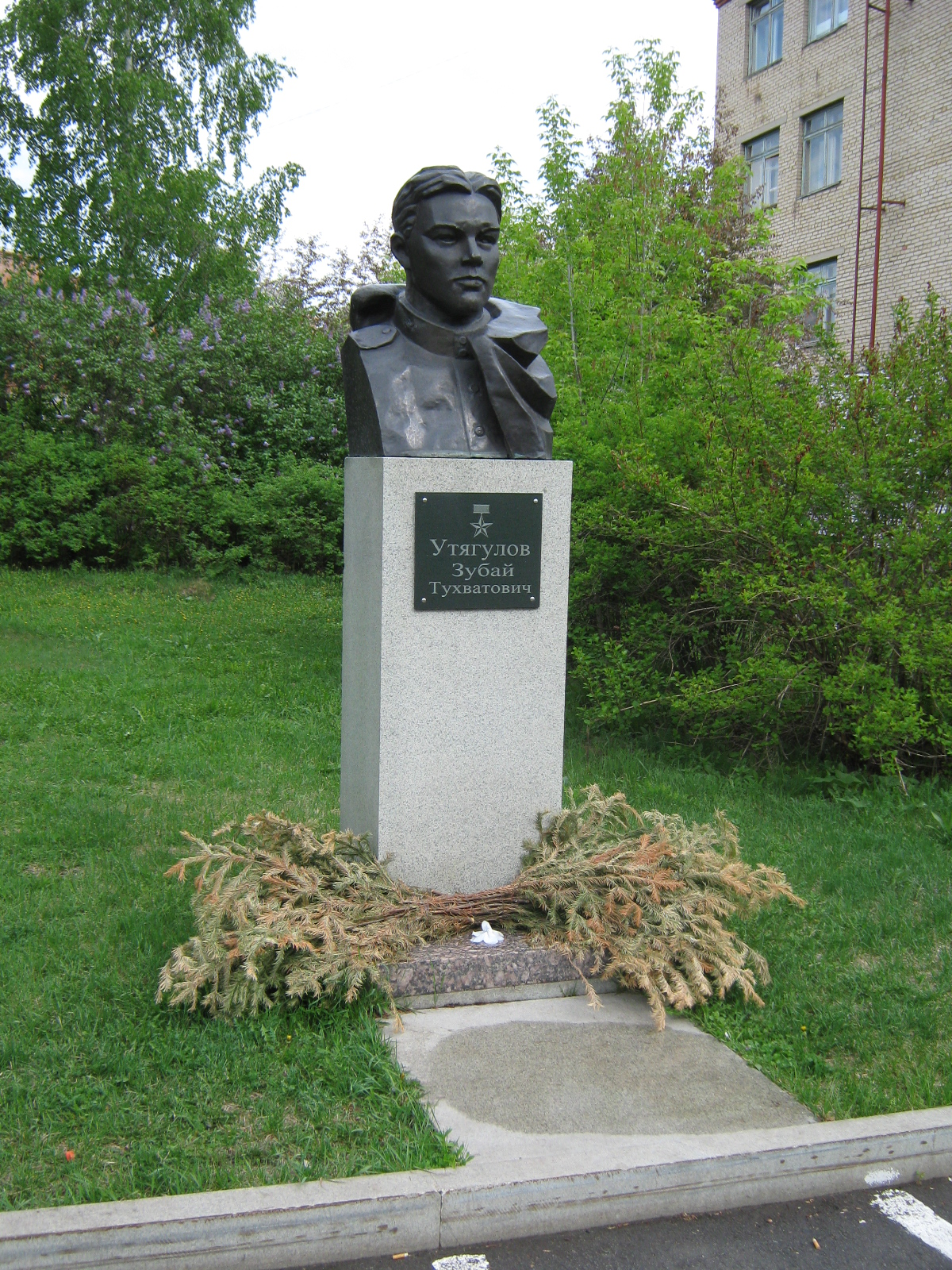
Bust of Utyagulov in Beloretsk

- A memorial plaque to Zubay Utyagulov was installed on the wall of the school in the village of Arkaulovo.
- A memorial plaque in honor of school graduates D. G. Kiekbaev and Z. T. Utyagulov was installed on the wall of the Makarov school in the village of Makarovo.
- A bust of Utyagulov was erected in Beloretsk.
- A monument to 13 Heroes was erected at the platform of the Krasnovka station.
- In Moscow, in the Central Museum of the Armed Forces, a stand "Thirteen Heroes of Krasnovka" was.
- An exhibition at the Makarov school in the Ishimbay region is dedicated to Utyagulov.
