= Kharun Bogatyrev =

Soviet Karachay colonel (1907–1966)

Kharun Umarovich Bogatyrev
- Харун Умарович Богатырёв
- Born: 15 September 1907; Dzhegut aul, Prikubansky District, Karachay-Cherkess Republic
- Died: 10 July 1966 (aged 58); Karachayevsk, USSR
- Military career
- Allegiance: Soviet Union
- Branch: Red Army
- Service years: 1931–1954
- Rank: Colonel
- Conflicts: World War II
- Awards: Hero of the Soviet Union

Kharun Umarovich Bogatyrev (Russian: Харун Умарович Богатырёв; 15 September 1907 – 10 July 1966) was the deputy commander of the 51st Guards Tank Brigade and later the commander of the 52nd Guards Tank Brigade of the Red Army during the Second World War. For his success during the Battle of the Dnieper he was awarded the title Hero of the Soviet Union, despite his first nomination for the title being rejected because of his Karachay ethnicity. He was the first Karachay awarded the title.
