= List of Heroes of the Soviet Union (K) =

The Hero of the Soviet Union was the highest distinction of the Soviet Union. It was awarded 12,775 times. Due to the large size of the list, it has been broken up into multiple pages.

== Recipients ==
- Nikolai Kabak
- Grigory Kabakovsky
- Ivan Kabalin
- Nikolai Kabalin
- Vasily Kabanov
- Vladimir Kabanov
- Yevgeny Kabanov
- Konstantin Kabanov
- Mikhail Kabanov
- Pavel Kabanov
- Igor Kaberov
- Tulen Kabilov
- Boris Kabishev
- Ivan Kabushkin ru
- Ilya Kaverin
- Andrey Kavtaskin ru
- Grigory Kagamlyk ru
- Pyotr Kagykin ru
- Sergey Kadanchik
- János Kádár
- Sergey Kadetov ru
- Anatoly Kadomtsev ru
- Mikhail Kadochkin ru
- Ivan Kadochnikov ru
- Nikolai Kadun ru
- Iosif Kaduchenko ru
- Leonid Kadyrgaliev ru
- Ochil Kadyrov
- Aleksandr Kazayev ru
- Ivan Kazayev ru
- Dmitry Kazak ru
- Ivan Kazak ru
- Daniil Kazakevich
- Pavel Kazakevich ru
- Aleksandr Afanasievich Kazakov ru
- Aleksandr Ilyich Kazakov (soldier) ru
- Aleksandr Ilyich Kazakov (pilot) ru
- Anatoly Kazakov ru
- Vasily Ivanovich Kazakov (marshal)
- Vasily Ivanovich Kazakov (sergeant) ru
- Viktor Kazakov
- Grigory Kazakov ru
- Konstantin Kazakov ru
- Mikhail Ilyich Kazakov
- Mikhail Nikolayevich Kazakov ru
- Nikolai Yakovlevich Kazakov ru
- Pyotr Kazakov ru
- Stepan Aleksandrovich Kazakov ru
- Stepan Terentevich Kazakov ru
- Temirey Kazakov ru
- Aleksey Kazamatov ru
- Sharifzyan Kazanbaev
- Vasily Kazantsev ru
- Aleksandr Kazartsev ru
- Ashot Kazaryan ru
- Amayak Kazaryan ru
- Andranik Kazaryan ru
- Ashkharbek Kazaryan ru
- Nikolai Ivanovich Kazachenko ru
- Nikolai Mikhailovich Kazachenko ru
- Konstantin Kazachinsky ru
- Aleksey Kazachkov ru
- Marat Kazey
- Vasily Kazimirov ru
- Salahaddin Kazimov
- Isay Kazinets ru
- Junuspey Kaipov ru
- Makhmet Kairbayev ru
- Anatoly Kaida ru
- Konstantin Kaidalov ru
- Vladimir Kaidash ru
- Vasily Kaikin ru
- Pavel Kaikov ru
- Nikita Kaimanov ru
- Ivan Kakovkin ru
- Aleksey Kalabin ru
- Valentin Kalabun ru
- Ivan Kalabushkin ru
- Dmitry Kalarash ru
- Boris Kalach ru
- Aleksandr Kalachyov ru
- Anatoly Kalachyov ru
- Vladimir Kalachyov ru
- Aleksandr Kalashnikov ru
- Anatoly Kalashnikov ru
- Ivan Kalashnikov ru
- Nikolai Kalashnikov ru
- Prokofy Kalashnikov ru
- Yakov Kalashnikov ru
- Aleksey Kalganov ru
- Ivan Kalganov ru
- Jumagali Kaldykoraev ru
- Ivan Kalendyuk ru
- Dmitry Kalenik ru
- Ivan Kalenikov ru
- Nikolai Kalyonov ru
- Ivan Kaliberda ru
- Anvar Kaliev ru
- Ivan Kalimanov ru
- Aleksandr Kalina ru
- Aleksandr Kalinin ru
- Aleksey Kalinin ru
- Boris Kalinin ru
- Vasily Kalinin ru
- Vladimir Kalinin ru
- Gavriil Kalinin ru
- Dmitry Kalinin ru
- Ivan Andreevich Kalinin ru
- Ivan Nikolaevich Kalinin ru
- Konstantin Kalinin ru
- Mikhail Mikhail Kalinin ru
- Mikhail Stepanovich Kalinin ru
- Nikolai Nikitovich Kalinin ru
- Nikolai Tikhonovich Kalinin ru
- Stepan Kalinin ru
- Tikhon Kalinin ru
- Fyodor Kalinin ru
- Nikolai Kalinich ru
- Grigory Martynovich Kalinichenko ru
- Grigory Nikolaevich Kalinichenko ru
- Semyon Kalinichenko ru
- Boris Kalinkin ru
- Mikhail Kalinkin ru
- Stepan Kalinkovsky ru
- Vasily Kalishin ru
- Aleksey Kalmykov ru
- Aleksandr Kaloev ru
- Georgy Kaloev ru
- Aleksandr Kalugin ru
- Fyodor Kalugin ru
- Grigory Kalustov ru
- Nikolai Kalutsky ru
- Leonid Kalyan ru
- Nikolai Kalyuzhny ru
- Pavel Kalyuzhny ru
- Aleksandr Kamagin ru
- Farakh Kamaldinov ru
- Galimzan Kamaleyev ru
- Nikolai Kamanin
- Mikhail Kamelchik ru
- Konstantin Kamenev ru
- Filimon Kamenev ru
- Ivan Kamennykh ru
- Vladimir Kamenshchikov ru
- Dmitry Kamzarakov ru
- Kanash Kamzin ru
- Ivan Kaminsky ru
- Pavel Kamozin (twice)
- Dmitry Kamolikov
- Kirill Kamynin ru
- Vladimir Kamyshev ru
- Ivan Kamyshev ru
- Aleksey Kanaev ru
- Aleksandr Kananadze ru
- Viktor Kanaryov ru
- Vladimir Kanareyev ru
- Aleksandr Kanarchik ru
- Pyotr Kandaurov ru
- Boris Kandybin ru
- Aleksandr Kanevsky ru
- Dmitry Kanishchev ru
- Vladimir Kankava ru
- Akhmet-khan Kankoshev ru
- Vsevolod Kansky ru
- Meliton Kantariya
- Vasily Kanunnikov ru
- Georgy Kantsev ru
- Vasily Kapitonov ru
- Lazar Kaplan ru
- Arkady Kaplunov
- Ilya Kaplunov
- Pyotr Kapralov ru
- Dmitry Kaprin ru
- Rafael Kaprelyan
- Vladimir Kapustin ru
- Mikhail Kapustin ru
- Pyotr Kapustin ru
- Nikolai Kapustinkov ru
- Viktor Kapshuk ru
- Yelbai Karabayev ru
- Negmat Karabayev ru
- Dmitry Karaban ru
- Aleksey Karabanov ru
- Nikolai Karabulin
- Ivan Karabut ru
- Pavel Karavay ru
- Aleksandr Karaev ru
- Juman Karakulov ru
- Pyotr Karamushko ru
- Viktor Karandakov ru
- Askanaz Karapetyan ru
- Guren Karapetyan ru
- Aleksandr Karasyov
- Aleksey Karasyov ru
- Anton Karasyov ru
- Viktor Karasyov ru
- Ivan Karasyov ru
- Mikhail Karasyov ru
- Sergey Karasyov ru
- Savva Karas ru
- Afanasy Karataev ru
- Ilya Karataev ru
- Vasily Karaulov ru
- Jahan Karakhanyan ru
- Nikita Karatsupa ru
- Ivan Karacharov ru
- Mikhail Karachev ru
- Pyotr Karachev ru
- Konstantin Karachkov ru
- Vladimir Karachun ru
- Dmitry Karbyshev
- Kobard Kardanov ru
- Kubati Kardanov ru
- Murat Kardanov ru
- Yuri Kardashenko ru
- Aleksey Kardashin ru
- Anatoly Karelin
- Ivan Karelin ru
- Kostantin Karelin ru
- Pyotr Grigorievich Karelin ru
- Pyotr Petrovich Karelin ru
- Grigory Karizhsky
- Gulyam Karimov ru
- Konstantin Karitsky ru
- Sergey Karitsky ru
- Valentin Karlov ru
- Fyodor Karlov ru
- Afanasy Karmanov ru
- Ivan Karmanovsky ru
- Vladimir Karmatsky ru
- Timofey Karmatsky ru
- Dmitry Karmishin ru
- Mikhail Karnakov ru
- Vitaly Karnaukhov ru
- Mikhail Karnaushenko ru
- Stepan Karnach ru
- Nikolai Karnachyonok ru
- Aleksandr Karozin ru
- Vasily Karpachyov ru
- Mikhail Karpeev
- Akim Karpenko ru
- Vasily Karpenko ru
- Viktor Karpenko ru
- Vily Karpenko ru
- Ivan Mikhailovich Karpenko ru
- Ivan Trofimovich Karpenko ru
- Nikolai Karpenko ru
- Grigory Karpetkin ru
- Frants Karpinsky ru
- Aleksandr Alekseyevich Karpov ru
- Aleksandr Dmitrievich Karpov ru
- Aleksandr Terentevich Karpov (twice)
- Viktor Karpov ru
- Vladimir Karpov
- Grigory Karpov ru
- Ivan Petrovich Karpov ru
- Ivan Yakovlevich Karpov ru
- Mikhail Karpov ru
- Nikolai Karpov ru
- Sergey Karpov ru
- Stefan Karpov ru
- Vikenty Karpovich ru
- Viktor Karpukhin
- Mikhail Karpukhin ru
- Kazbek Karsanov ru
- Konstantin Kartashev ru
- Aleksey Kartashov ru
- Gerold Kartashov ru
- Arkady Kartoshkin ru
- Aleksandr Karushin ru
- Kuchkar Karshiev ru
- Salavat Karymov ru
- Vasily Karyakin ru
- Osman Kasayev
- Nikolai Kasatkin ru
- Vladimir Kasatonov
- Ivan Kasatonov ru
- Nikolai Kasimov ru
- Haidar Kasimov ru
- Polikarp Kasinov ru
- Leonid Kaskov ru
- Ashot Kasparov ru
- Suren Kasparyan ru
- Saidusman Kasymkhodzhaev ru
- Konstantin Kaskov ru
- Ivan Kasyan ru
- Andrey Kasyan ru
- Mikhail Kataev ru
- Gennady Katarin ru
- Nikolai Katin ru
- Ivan Katukov ru
- Fyodor Grigorievich Katukov ru
- Fyodor Leontevich Katkov ru
- Ivan Katorzhny ru
- Aleksey Katrich ru
- Mikhail Katukov (twice)
- Ilya Katunin ru
- Pyotr Katukhin ru
- Andrey Katyshev ru
- Boris Katyshev ru
- Ivan Kaulko ru
- Toganbai Kaumbaev ru
- Fyodor Kaurov ru
- Ilya Kachalin ru
- Ivan Kachalko ru
- Yevgeny Kachanov ru
- Ivan Kachanov ru
- Ivan Kachurin ru
- Vasily Kashenkov ru
- Ivan Kashin ru
- Nikolai Ivanovich Kashin (officer) ru
- Nikolai Ivanovich Kashin (sergeant) ru
- Aleksey Kashintsev ru
- Aleksandr Kashirin ru
- Aleksey Kashirin ru
- Viktor Kashirkin ru
- Pyotr Kashpurov ru
- Viktor Kashtankin ru
- Aleksey Kashtanov ru
- Vladimir Kashuba ru
- Pavel Kashuba ru
- Pavel Kashurin ru
- Prokhor Kashutin ru
- Mikhail Kashcheyev ru
- Tikhon Kashcheyev ru
- Vera Kashcheyeva
- Mikhail Kayukin ru
- Mikhail Kvasnikov ru
- Ivan Kvasov ru
- Vasiliy Kvachantiradze
- Dmitry Kvasha ru
- Aleksandr Kvashnin ru
- Ivan Kvashnin ru
- Vyacheslav Kvitinsky ru
- Aleksandr Kvitkov ru
- Dmitry Kvitovich ru
- Nikolai Kedyshko ru
- Gleb Kelbas ru
- Georgy Kelpsh ru
- Mikhail Kelchin ru
- Tule Kenzhebaev ru
- Fyodor Kerdan ru
- Tagir Karzhnyov ru
- Astan Kesaev ru
- Sergey Ketiladze ru
- Tulush Kechil-ool ru
- Aleksandr Khabarov ru
- Konstantin Khadzhiev ru
- Vladimir Khazov ru
- Nikolai Khazov ru
- Vasily Khailo ru
- Aleksandr Khalamenyuk ru
- Vasily Khalev ru
- Vasily Khalenko ru
- Aleksey Khaletsky ru
- Iosif Khalmanov ru
- Vladimir Khalo ru
- Aleksandr Khalzev ru
- Viktor Khalzov ru
- Maksim Khalyavitsky ru
- Timofey Khandoga ru
- Lev Khandrikov ru
- Pavel Khanzhin ru
- Vasily Khantaev ru
- Ivan Khaprov ru
- Georgy Kharaborkin
- Vladimir Kharaziya ru
- Yakov Khardikov ru
- Mikhail Kharin ru
- Aleksandr Kharitonov ru
- Andrey Kharitonov ru
- Vasily Dmitrievich Kharitonov ru
- Vasily Nikolayevich Kharitonov ru
- Vladimir Kharitonov ru
- Nikolai Vasilyevich Kharitonov ru
- Nikolai Nikolayevich Kharitonov ru
- Nikolai Pavlovich Kharitonov ru
- Pyotr Kharitonov ru
- Fyodor Kharitonov ru
- Aleksandr Kharitoshkin ru
- Vasily Kharitoshkin ru
- Vasily Ilyich Kharlamov ru
- Vasily Maksimovich Kharlamov ru
- Georgy Kharlamov ru
- Grigory Kharlamov ru
- Mikhail Kharlamov ru
- Nikolai Kharlamov ru
- Semyon Kharlamov
- Sergey Kharlamov ru
- Ivan Kharlan ru
- Ivan Ivanovich Kharlanov ru
- Ivan Stepanovich Kharlanov ru
- Aleksey Kharlov ru
- Fyodor Kharlov ru
- Fyodor Kharchevin ru
- Aleksandr Kharchenko ru
- Vasily Kharchenko ru
- Ivan Petrovich Kharchenko ru
- Ivan Ustinovich Kharchenko
- Mikhail Kharchenko ru
- Pavel Kharchenko ru
- Semyon Kharchenko ru
- Stepan Kharchenko ru
- Fyodor Kharchenko ru
- Yuri Kharchenko ru
- Mikhail Karchikov ru
- Ivan Kharchin ru
- Viktor Kharchistov ru
- Anatoly Kharkovets ru
- Pyotr Kharkovsky ru
- Mansur Khasanshin ru
- Viktor Khasin ru
- Andrey Khatanzeysky ru
- Grigory Khaustov ru
- Ilya Khakherin ru
- Volf Khatskevich ru
- Georgy Khachin ru
- Mikhail Khvastantsev ru
- Mikhail Khvatkov
- Ivan Khvatov ru
- Leonid Khvorov ru
- Ilya Khvorostyanov ru
- Pavel Khvostov ru
- Andrey Khvostunov ru
- Nikita Khvoya ru
- Semyon Kheyfets ru
- Georgy Khetagurov
- Bembya Khechiev ru
- Boris Khigrin ru
- Vasily Khilchuk ru
- Andrey Khimenko ru
- Vasily Khimich ru
- Fyodor Khimich ru
- Nikolai Khimushin ru
- Stepan Khirkov ru
- Zakhar Khitalishvili ru
- Boris Khiteyev ru
- Vasily Khitrin ru
- Nikolai Khitrov ru
- Ivan Khitsenko ru
- Mikhail Khlebnikov ru
- Nikolai Khlebnikov ru
- Nikolai Khlebov ru
- Aleksey Khlobystov
- Nikolai Khloponin ru
- Boris Khlud ru
- Fyodor Khludnev ru
- Pyotr Khlyustin ru
- Ilya Khmaladze ru
- Pavel Khmelyov ru
- Arkady Khmelevsky ru
- Ivan Khmel ru
- Ivan Khovansky ru
- Roman Khovansky ru
- Dmitry Khodakov ru
- Nikolai Khodenko ru
- Irnapas Khodzhaev ru
- Saparmet Khodzhaev ru
- Konstantin Khodov ru
- Nikolai Khodosov ru
- Valentin Khodyrev ru
- Ivan Khodyrev ru
- Nikolai Khozyainov ru
- Ivan Kholobtsev ru
- Valentin Kholod ru
- Grigory Kholod ru
- Mikhail Kholod ru
- Timofey Kholod ru
- Yegor Kholodkov ru
- Georgy Kholodny ru
- Ivan Mikhailovich Kholodov ru
- Ivan Sidorovich Kholodov ru
- Georgy Kholostyakov ru
- Ivan Kholoshchak ru
- Aleksey Kholstov ru
- Aleksey Kholzunov ru
- Viktor Kholzunov ru
- Nikolai Kholyavkin ru
- Ivan Antonovich Khomenko ru
- Ivan Fedotovich Khomenko ru
- Ignat Khomenko ru
- Sergey Dmitrievich Khomenko ru
- Nikolai Khomenkov ru
- Vladimir Khomrach ru
- Oleg Komutov ru
- Churguy-ool Khomushku
- Vladimir Khomchenovsky ru
- Vasily Khomyakov ru
- Vladilen Khomyakov ru
- Leonid Khomyakov ru
- Maksim Khomyakov ru
- Stepan Khoptyar ru
- Nikolai Khorokhonov ru
- Vladimir Khoroshilov ru
- Semyon Khoroshilov ru
- Vera Kharuzhaya
- Nikolai Khor ru
- Mikhail Khorkov ru
- Mikhail Khotimsky ru
- Vasily Khokhlachyov ru
- Anatoly Khokhlov ru
- Ivan Khokhlov ru
- Konstantin Khokhlov
- Moisey Khokhlov ru
- Nikolai Khokhlov ru
- Pyotr Vasilyevich Khokhlov ru
- Pyotr Ilyich Khokhlov ru
- Semyon Khokhryakov (twice)
- Fyodor Khokhryakov ru
- Nikolai Khramov ru
- Sergey Khramtsov ru
- Leonid Khrapov ru
- Nikolai Khrapov ru
- Pyotr Khrapov ru
- Semyon Khrebto ru
- Fyodor Khrebtov ru
- Arkady Khrenov ru
- Pyotr Khrenov ru
- Yegor Khristenko ru
- Aleksandr Khristov ru
- Ivan Khromenkov ru
- Boris Khromov ru
- Ivan Khromov ru
- Vasily Khromykh ru
- Yevgeny Khrunov
- Pavel Ivanovich Khrustalyov ru
- Pavel Pavlovich Khrustalyov ru
- Vladislav Khrustitsky ru
- Ivan Khrushchev ru
- Nikita Khrushchev
- Nikolai Khrykov ru
- Pyotr Khrychoyv ru
- Sergey Khryukin ru
- Timofey Khryukin (twice)
- Vasily Khryaev ru
- Fyodor Khudanin ru
- Nikolai Khudenko ru
- Pyotr Khudov ru
- Grigory Khudoleyev ru
- Aleksandr Khuydyakov ru
- Vasily Khuydyakov ru
- Viktor Khuydyakov ru
- Ivan Khuydyakov ru
- Nikolai Aleksandrovich Khuydyakov ru
- Nikolai Vasilyevich Khuydyakov ru
- Antonina Khudyakova
- Ivan Khurtin ru
- Anatoly Khutoryansky ru
- Mikhail Khukhlov ru
- Aleksey Khukhrin ru
- Grigory Kiba ru
- Vasily Kibalko ru
- Ivan Kibal ru
- Viktor Kibenok
- Aleksandr Kibizov ru
- Mikhail Kibkalov ru
- Aleksey Kiva ru
- Filipp Kiva ru
- Fyodor Kidalov ru
- Stepan Kidko ru
- Andrey Kizhevatov
- Zhalel Kizatov ru
- Leonid Kizim
- Andrey Kizima ru
- Vasily Kiz ru
- Pyotr Kizyun ru
- Mikhail Kikosh ru
- German Kilasoniya ru
- Porfiry Kilin ru
- Mikhail Kildyakov ru
- Yevgeny Kim
- Ivan Kineshov ru
- Khodi Kinzhaev ru
- Ivan Kindyushev ru
- Vladimir Kipenko ru
- Ivan Kipot ru
- Isakk Kirgetov ru
- Stepan Kirgizov ru
- Gavriil Kirdishchev ru
- Aleksey Kireyev ru
- Viktor Kireyev ru
- Ivan Kireyev ru
- Nikolai Kireyev ru
- Semyon Kireyev ru
- Timofey Kirenkov ru
- Ivan Kirik ru
- Vasily Kirilenko ru
- Nikolai Kirilenko ru
- Aleksandr Kirillov ru
- Veniamin Kirillov ru
- Vladimir Kirillov ru
- Mikhail Mikhailovich Kirillov ru
- Mikhail Petrovich Kirillov ru
- Mikhail Semyonovich Kirillov ru
- Nikolai Mikhailovich Kirillov ru
- Nikolai Pavlovich Kirillov ru
- Andrey Kirilyuk ru
- Viktor Kirilyuk ru
- Sergey Kirichek ru
- Aleksandr Kirichenko ru
- Aleksey Kirichenko ru
- Ivan Kirichenko ru
- Mikhail Kirichenko ru
- Pyotr Kirichenko ru
- Vasily Kirichuk ru
- Shalva Kiriya ru
- Vladimir Kirmanovich ru
- Boris Kirpikov ru
- Illarion Kirpichyov ru
- Ivan Kirpichenko ru
- Mikhail Kirponos
- Aleksandr Kirsanov ru
- Vladimir Kirsanov ru
- Ivan Kirsanov ru
- Nikolai Kirtok ru
- Vasily Kiryakov ru
- Konstantin Kiryanov ru
- Nikolai Kiryanov ru
- Pavel Kiryanov ru
- Mikhail Kiryukhin ru
- Nikolai Kiryukhin
- Aleksandr Kiselyov ru
- Afrikan Kiselyov ru
- Vasily Alekseyevich Kiselyov ru
- Vasily Iosifovich Kiselyov ru
- Vasily Nikolaevich Kiselyov ru
- Vladimir Kiselyov ru
- Gennady Kiselyov ru
- Ivan Aleksandrovich Kiselyov (artilleryman) ru
- Ivan Aleksandrovich Kiselyov (tankman) ru
- Ivan Gerasimovich Kiselyov ru
- Ivan Mikhailovich Kiselyov ru
- Nikolai Kiselyov ru
- Rafail Kiselyov ru
- Semyon Kiselyov ru
- Sergey Ivanovich Kiselyov ru
- Sergey Semyonovich Kiselyov ru
- Stepan Kiselyov ru
- Yakov Kiselyov ru
- Ivan Kiselenko ru
- Pyotr Kiselenko ru
- Aleksey Kislintsyn ru
- Pyotr Kislov ru
- Ivan Kislukhin ru
- Mariya Kislyak
- Nikolai Kislyak ru
- Anatoly Kislyakov ru
- Vasily Kislyakov ru
- Mikhail Kislyakov ru
- Anatoly Kisov ru
- Ivan Kistaev ru
- Nikolai Mikhailovich Kitaev ru
- Nikolai Trofimovich Kitaev ru
- Pavel Kitchenko ru
- Ivan Kitsenko ru
- Nikolai Kichigin ru
- Nikolai Kiyanchenko ru
- Viktor Kiyashko ru
- Grigory Kiyashko ru
- Mikhail Kiyashko ru
- Nikolai Kiyashko ru
- Viktor Kladiev ru
- Vasily Klevtsov ru
- Ivan Klevtsov ru
- Sergey Klevtsov ru
- Fyodor Kleybus ru
- Robert Klein ru
- Prokofy Klepach ru
- Goergy Klepikov ru
- Nikolai Klepikov ru
- Ivan Kleshch ru
- Aleksey Kleshchev
- Ivan Kleshchyov ru
- Ivan Klimov ru
- Alekseu Klimashkin ru
- Grigory Klimenko ru
- Ivan Klimenko ru
- Kondrat Klimenko ru
- Mikhail Klimenko ru
- Nikolai Ivanovich Klimenko ru
- Nikolai Nikolayevich Klimenko ru
- Nikolai Sergeyevich Klimenko ru
- Nikolai Fyodorovich Klimenko ru
- Pyotr Klimenko ru
- Sergey Klimenko ru
- Tikhon Klimenko ru
- Trofim Klimenko ru
- Dmitry Klimzov ru
- Vasily Klimov ru
- Vladimir Klimov ru
- Ivan Klimov ru
- Ilya Klimov ru
- Mikhail Klimov ru
- Nikolai Klimov ru
- Pavel Klimov ru
- Sergey Klimovich ru
- Nikolai Klimovsky ru
- Pyotr Klimuk
- Aleksandr Klimushkin ru
- Aleksandr Klinkovsky ru
- Igor Klinov ru
- Klim Klinovitsky ru
- Aleksey Klinovoy ru
- Yegor Klishin ru
- Vsevolod Klokov ru
- Pyotr Klokov ru
- Nikolai Klochko ru
- Vasily Klochko ru
- Vladimir Klochko ru
- Ivan Klochko ru
- Yakov Klochko ru
- Aleksandr Klubov (twice)
- Yevgeny Klumov ru
- Nikolsi Klypin ru
- Mukhamed Klychev ru
- Vasily Klyuev ru
- Pyotr Klyuev ru
- Vasily Klyukin ru
- Ivan Klyuchnik ru
- Aleksey Klyushkin ru
- Yevgeny Klyushnikov ru
- Platon Klyata ru
- Eduard Knyaginichev ru
- Aleksey Arsentevich Knyazev ru
- Aleksey Petrovich Knyazev ru
- Vasim Knyazev ru
- Vasily Knyazev ru
- Ivan Knyazev ru
- Mikhail Knyazev ru
- Nikolai Knyazev ru
- Nikolai Knyazkin ru
- Ivan Knyazkov ru
- Aleksandr Kobelev ru
- Arkady Kobelev ru
- Yermolay Koberidze ru
- Semyon Kobets ru
- Fyodor Kobets ru
- Yakov Kobzar ru
- Anatoly Kobzev ru
- Stepan Kobzev ru
- Ivan Kobzun ru
- Khamit Kobikov ru
- Aleksandr Kobisskoy ru
- Anatoly Koblikov ru
- Sergey Koblov ru
- Ivan Kobyletsky ru
- Ivan Kobylyansky ru
- Boris Kobyakov ru
- Ivan Kobyakov ru
- Aleksey Kovalyov ru
- Andrey Kovalyov ru
- Valentin Kovalyov ru
- Venedikt Kovalyov ru
- Vladimir Kovalyov ru
- Grigory Kovalyov ru
- Dmitry Kovalyov ru
- Ivan Kovalyov ru
- Konstantin Kovalyov
- Mikhail Kovalyov ru
- Nikita Kovalyov ru
- Nikolai Ivanovich Kovalyov ru
- Nikolai Kuzmich Kovalyov ru
- Nikolai Nikolayevich Kovalyov ru
- Pavel Savelevich Kovalyov ru
- Pavel Stepanovich Kovalyov ru
- Pyotr Kovalyov ru
- Stepan Kovalyov ru
- Timofey Alekseyevich Kovalyov ru
- Timofey Fyodorovich Kovalyov ru
- Filipp Kovalyov ru
- Anatoly Kovalevsky ru
- Pavel Kovalevsky ru
- Aleksandr Kovalenko ru
- Anatoly Kovalenko ru
- Boris Kovalenko ru
- Vasily Kovalenko ru
- Georgy Kovalenko ru
- Grigory Kovalenko ru
- Pavel Kovalenko ru
- Pyotr Danilovich Kovalenko ru
- Pyotr Ivanovich Kovalenko ru
- Pyotr Mikhailovich Kovalenko ru
- Sergey Kovalenko ru
- Yuri Kovalenko ru
- Vladimir Kovalyonok
- Aleksandr Koval ru
- Dmitry Koval ru
- Ivan Ivanovich Koval ru
- Ivan Nestrovich Koval ru
- Ksenofont Koval ru
- Anton Kovalsky ru
- Stalislav Kovalchuk ru
- Dmitry Kovalchuk ru
- Ivan Kovalchuk ru
- Ivan Kovanev ru
- Pyotr Kovats ru
- Arkady Kovachevich
- Dmitry Koveshnikov ru
- Boris Kovzan
- Sydir Kovpak (twice)
- Ilya Kovrizhko ru
- Fyodor Kovrov ru
- Vasily Yefimovich Kovtun ru
- Vasily Semyonovich Kovtun ru
- Grigory Kovtun ru
- Karp Kovtun ru
- Pavel Kovtun ru
- Georgy Kovtunov ru
- Dmitry Kovtyulev ru
- Ivan Kovsharov ru
- Natalya Kovshova
- Mikhail Kodochigov ru
- Vasily Kozhanov
- Nikolai Kozhanov ru
- Pyotr Kozhanov ru
- Ilya Kozhar ru
- Aliaskar Kozhebergenov ru
- Anatoly Kozhevnikov ru
- Ivan Kozhedub (thrice)
- Ivan Kozhemyakin ru
- Mikhail Kozhemyakin ru
- Pyotr Kozhemyakin ru
- Pavel Kozhin ru
- Vasily Kozhukhov ru
- Nikolai Kozhushkin ru
- Semyon Kozak (twice)
- Stepan Kozak ru
- Aleksandr Kozakov ru
- Nikolai Kozachek ru
- Aleksay Kozachenko ru
- Pyotr Kozachenko ru
- Ivan Kozachuk ru
- Vasily Kozenkov ru
- Anatoly Koziev ru
- Nestor Kozin
- Pyotr Kozinets ru
- Ivan Kozich ru
- Pyotr Kozlenko ru
- Mefody Kozlitin ru
- Aleksandr Kozlov ru
- Aleksey Kozlov ru
- Arsenty Kozlov ru
- Valentin Georgievich Kozlov ru
- Valentin Tikhonovich Kozlov ru
- Vasily Kozlov
- Viktor Dmitrievich Kozlov ru
- Viktor Mikhailovich Kozlov ru
- Vladimir Kozlov ru
- Grigory Kozlov ru
- Dmitry Markovich Kozlov ru
- Dmitry Fyodorovich Kozlov ru
- Yefim Kozlov ru
- Ivan Yegorovich Kozlov ru
- Ivan Ivanovich Kozlov ru
- Ivan Semyonovich Kozlov ru
- Iosif Kozlov ru
- Mikhail Vasilyevich Kozlov ru
- Mikhail Danilovich Kozlov ru
- Mikhail Fyodorivich Kozlov ru
- Nikita Kozlov ru
- Nikolai Aleksandrovich Kozlov (pilot) ru
- Nikolai Aleksandrovich Kozlov (tankman) ru
- Nikolai Andreyevich Kozlov ru
- Nikolai Vasilyevich Kozlov ru
- Nikolai Mikhailovich Kozlov ru
- Pavel Kozlov ru
- Pyotr Alekseyevich Kozlov ru
- Pyotr Mikhailovich Kozlov ru
- Sergey Kozlov ru
- Stepan Kozlov ru
- Fyodor Kozlov ru
- Evald Kozlov ru
- Vasily Kozlovsky ru
- Iganty Kozlovsky ru
- Nikolai Kozlovsky ru
- Boris Koznov ru
- Mikhail Kozomazov ru
- Sardion Kozonov ru
- Andrey Kozorezov ru
- Pavel Kozyrev ru
- Sergey Kozyrev ru
- Maksim Kozyr ru
- Ivan Kozmin ru
- Nikolai Dmitrievich Kozyakov ru
- Nikolai Yefimovich Kozyakov ru
- Ivan Kozyarenko ru
- Vasily Koynash ru
- Vladimir Kokkinaki (twice)
- Konstantin Kokkinaki
- Semyon Kokora ru
- Pavel Kokorev ru
- Anatoly Aleksandrovich Kokorin ru
- Anatoly Mikhailovich Kokorin ru
- Fyodor Kokorin ru
- Yason Kokoskeriya ru
- Oleg Kokushkin
- Ivan Koksharov ru
- Mikhail Kolbasa ru
- Nikolai Kolbasov ru
- Aleksandr Kolbeyev ru
- Vasily Kolbnev ru
- Vladimir Kolbunov ru
- Mikhail Koldubov ru
- Aleksandr Koldunov (twice)
- Vasily Kolennikov ru
- Boris Kolesnik ru
- Kolesnik Artyomovich Kolesnik ru
- Vasily Vasilyevich Kolesnik ru
- Vasily Stepanovich Kolesnik ru
- Vladimir Kolesnik ru
- Pave; Avtonomovich Kolesnik ru
- Pavel Antonovich Kolesnik ru
- Pyotr Kolesnik ru
- Aleksandr Kolesnikov ru
- Aleksey Kolesnikov ru
- Vasily Kolesnikov ru
- Vitaly Kolesnikov ru
- Vladimir Alekseyevich Kolesnikov ru
- Vladimir Mikhailovich Kolesnikov ru
- Grigory Kolesnikov ru
- Ivan Kolesnikov ru
- Konstantin Kolesnikov ru
- Mikhail Kolesnikov ru
- Nikolai Vasilyevich Kolesnikov ru
- Nikolai Danilovich Kolesnikov ru
- Nikolai Pavlovich Kolesnikov ru
- Pyotr Kolesnikov ru
- Pimen Kolesnikov ru
- Semyon Gavrilovich Kolesnikov ru
- Semyon Nikitovich Kolesnikov ru
- Sidor Kolesnikov ru
- Fyodor Kolesnikov ru
- Vasily Kolesnichenko ru
- Mikhail Kolesnichenko ru
- Stepan Kolesnichenko ru
- Aleksandr Andreyevich Kolesov
- Aleksandr Mikhailovich Kolesov ru
- Yelena Kolesova
- Boris Kolessa ru
- Ivan Kolin ru
- Pyotr Kolmakov ru
- Leonid Kolobov
- Ivan Kolovanov ru
- Nikolai Kologoyda ru
- Mikhail Kologrivov ru
- Ivan Kolody ru
- Andrey Kolodin ru
- Nikolai Kolodko ru
- Aleksandr Kolodnikov ru
- Boris Kolodchenko ru
- Arsenty Kolodyazhny ru
- Pyotr Kolodyazhny ru
- Fyodor Kolokoltsev ru
- Anatoly Kolomeytsev ru
- Pyotr Ivanovich Kolomiets ru
- Pyotr Leontevich Kolomiets ru
- Ivan Kolomychenko ru
- Pyotr Kolomin ru
- Andrey Kolomoets ru
- Vasily Kolomoets ru
- Vasily Kolonov ru
- Aleksay Koloskov ru
- Pyotr Koloskov ru
- Vasily Kolosov ru
- Viktor Kolosov ru
- Mikhail Dmitrievich Kolosov ru
- Mikhail Yefimovich Kolosov ru
- Nikolai Vasilyevich Kolosov ru
- Nikolai Grigorievich Kolosov ru
- Leonid Kolotilov ru
- Vasily Koloshenko ru
- Pyotr Vasilyevich Kolpakov ru
- Pyotr Ivanovich Kolpakov ru
- Vladimir Kolpakchi
- Fyodor Koltyga ru
- Mikhail Kolchanov ru
- Nikolai Kolchev ru
- Aleksandr Kolchin ru
- Fyodor Kolykhmatov ru
- Nikolai Kolychev ru
- Oleg Kolychev ru
- Ivan Kolyshkin ru
- Aleksey Koltsov ru
- Ivan Koltsov ru
- Pavel Koltsov ru
- Nikolai Kolchak ru
- Yakov Kolchak ru
- Nikolai Kolyuzhny ru
- Vasily Kolyada ru
- Viktor Kolyadin ru
- Valentin Komagorov ru
- Konstantin Komardinkin ru
- Grigory Komaritsky ru
- Aleksandr Komarov ru
- Vasily Komarov ru
- Viktor Petrovich Komarov ru
- Viktor Stepanovich Komarov ru
- Vladimir Mikhailovich Komarov (twice)
- Vladimir Nikolayevich Komarov ru
- Georgy Vladimirovich Komarov ru
- Georgy Osipovich Komarov ru
- Grigory Komarov ru
- Dmitry Komarov ru
- Ivan Komarov ru
- Mikhail Komarov ru
- Nikolai Komarov ru
- Sergey Komarov ru
- Georgy Komarychev ru
- Dmitry Komar ru
- Yegor Kombarov ru
- Taimbet Komekbaev
- Mikhail Komelkov
- Sergey Komendant ru
- Vadim Komendat ru
- Valentin Komissarov ru
- Pyotr Komlev ru
- Stepan Komlev ru
- Arkady Komok ru
- Anatoly Komosa ru
- Fyodor Kompanteyets ru
- Aleksey Kompaniets ru
- Stepan Konashenko ru
- Fyodor Kongalyov ru
- Vasily Konvakov ru
- Viktor Kondakov ru
- Viktor Kondakov ru
- Vladimir Kondaurov ru
- Ivan Kondaurov ru
- Yemenlyan Kondrat ru
- Ivan Kondratenko ru
- Pyotr Kondratenko ru
- Ivan Kondratets ru
- Yakov Kondratov ru
- Nikita Kondratovich ru
- Ivan Dmitrievich Kondratev ru
- Ivan Petrovich Kondratev ru
- Leonty Kondratev ru
- Pyotr Kondratev ru
- Sergey Kondratev ru
- Aleksandr Kondratyuk ru
- Aleksandr Kondrashyov ru
- Andrey Kondrashin ru
- Ivan Kondrashin ru
- Serey Kondrin ru
- Aleksey Kondrtsky ru
- Pavel Kondyra ru
- Vasily Kondyryov ru
- Aleksandr Konev ru
- Boris Konev ru
- Viktor Konev ru
- Georgy Konev ru
- Ivan Nikianorovich Konev ru
- Ivan Nikitich Konev
- Ivan Stepanovich Konev (twice)
- Mikhail Konev ru
- Pavel Konev ru
- Pyotr Alekseyevich Konev ru
- Pyotr Prokofevich Konev ru
- Mikhail Konin ru
- Ivan Konishchev ru
- Grigory Konkin ru
- Mikhail Konkin ru
- Vasily Konnov ru
- Vasily Konobaev ru
- Vladimir Konovalenko ru
- Aleksey Konovalov ru
- Alndrey Konovalov ru
- Vladimir Konovalov
- Mikhail Vasilyevich Konovalov ru
- Mikhail Semyonovich Konovalov ru
- Pavel Konovalov ru
- Semyon Konovalov ru
- Sergey Konovalov ru
- Fyodor Konovalov ru
- Ilya Konovchenko ru
- Aleksey Kononenko ru
- Vasily Kononenko ru
- Nikita Kononenko ru
- Nikolai Kononenkov ru
- Aleksandr Kononov ru
- Mikhail Kononov ru
- Nikolai Kononov ru
- Pyotr Kononykhin ru
- Vasily Konoplya ru
- Ivan Konorev ru
- Vladimir Konosh ru
- Aleksandr Konstantinov ru
- Anatoly Konstantinov
- Vladimir Konstantinov
- Garush Konstantinov ru
- Ivan Konstantinov ru
- Lavrenty Konstantinov ru
- Mikhail Petrovich Konstantinov
- Mikhail Romanovich Konstantinov ru
- Nikolai Konstantinov ru
- Kseniya Konstantinova
- Tamara Konstantinova
- Aleksey Kontushny ru
- Nazir Konukoev ru
- Zinovy Kontsevoy ru
- Nikolai Konchakov ru
- Aleksandr Konchin ru
- Nikolai Konyshev ru
- Ivan Konko ru
- Gennady Konkov ru
- Pyotr Konkov ru
- Fyodor Konkov ru
- Andrey Konshakov ru
- Sergey Konyukhov ru
- Iosif Konyusha ru
- Anatoly Konyaev ru
- Arkady Konyaev ru
- Pyotr Konyaev ru
- Aleksandr Fyodorovich Konyakhin ru
- Aleksandr Romanovich Konyakhin ru
- Vasily Konyakhin ru
- Ivan Konyakhin ru
- Maksim Konyashkin ru
- Grigory Kopaev ru
- Igor Kopeykin ru
- Ivan Kopyonkin ru
- Ivan Kopets ru
- Mikhail Koptev ru
- Grigory Koptilov ru
- Vasily Alekseyevich Koptsov
- Vasily Danilovich Kopylov ru
- Vasily Ivanovich Kopylov ru
- Ivan Andreyevich Kopylov ru
- Ivan Pavlovich Kopylov ru
- Mikhail Kopylov ru
- Nikolai Veniaminovich Kopylov ru
- Nikolai Iosifovich Kopylov ru
- Pavel Kopylov ru
- Stepan Kopylov ru
- Nikolai Kopytyonkov ru
- Mikhail Kapytin ru
- Mikhail Kopytov ru
- Stepan Kopytov ru
- Konstantin Korablyov ru
- Vladimir Korablin ru
- Pyotr Korbut ru
- Vladimir Korguzalov ru
- Vasily Korda ru
- Shika Kordonsky ru
- Vasily Kordyuchenko ru
- Aleksey Korelyakov ru
- Ivan Korenkov ru
- Feodosy Korenchuk ru
- Vasily Korenkov ru
- Vasily Korzh
- Fyodor Korzhavin ru
- Daniil Korzhov ru
- Vladimir Korzhushko ru
- Konstantin Korzov ru
- Andrey Korzun ru
- Ivan Korzunov ru
- Dmitry Korkotsenko ru
- Ivan Kormilkin ru
- Ivan Kormishin ru
- Aleksandr Aleksandrovich Kornev ru
- Aleksandr Stepanovich Kornev ru
- Vasily Kornev ru
- Grigory Kornev ru
- Ivan Ilyich Kornev ru
- Ivan Fyodorovich Kornev ru
- Leonid Kornev ru
- Afanasy Korneyev ru
- Vasily Klimovich Korneyev ru
- Vasily Terentevich Korneyev ru
- Vladimir Korneyev ru
- Georgy Korneyev ru
- Grigory Korneyev ru
- Ivan Aleksandrovich Korneyev ru
- Ivan Ilyich Korneyev ru
- Yakov Korneyev ru
- Vasily Korneyko ru
- Viktor Korner ru
- Ivan Mikheyevich Kornienko ru
- Ivan Moiseyevich Kornienko ru
- NikolaiKornienko ru
- Prokofy Kornienko ru
- Anatoly Kornilaev ru
- Boris Kornilov ru
- Mikhail Dmitrievich Kornilov ru
- Mikhail Semyonovich Kornilov ru
- Mikhail Kornitsky ru
- Vasily Kornishin ru
- Nikolai Kornyushkin ru
- Afanasy Korobeynikov ru
- Nikolai Korobeynikov ru
- Miron Korobeshko ru
- Vasily Korobkin ru
- Ivan Korobkin ru
- Dmitry Korobkov ru
- Pavel Korobkov
- Fyodor Korobkov ru
- Aleksandr Korobov ru
- Vadim Korobov ru
- Grigory Korobov ru
- Mikhail Korobov ru
- Stepan Korobov ru
- Aleksandr Korobchuk ru
- Artyom Korovin ru
- Ilya Korovin ru
- Kesar Korovin ru
- Nikolai Korovin ru
- Yakov Korovin ru
- Nikolai Korovushkin ru
- Ivan Korogodin ru
- Aleksandr Korolyov ru
- Vasily Aleksandrovich Korolyov ru
- Vasily Ivanovich Korolyov ru
- Vitaly Korolyov ru
- Vladimir Korolyov ru
- Gerasim Korolyov ru
- Ivan Korolyov ru
- Iosif Korolyov ru
- Konstantin Korolyov ru
- Matvey Korolyov ru
- Nikolai Mikhailovich Korolyov ru
- Nikolai Stepanovich Korolyov
- Nikolai Filippovich Korolyov ru
- Pavel Korolyov ru
- Roman Korolyov ru
- Fyodor Korolyov ru
- Grigory Korolenko ru
- Ivan Vasilyevich Korolkov ru
- Ivan Ivanovich Korolkov ru
- Ivan Fyodorovich Korolkov ru
- Aleksandr Korolsky ru
- Ivan Korolyuk ru
- Aleksey Korostelyov ru
- Pavel Korostelyov ru
- Pyotr Korostelyov ru
- Konstantin Koroteyev
- Nikolai Korotky ru
- Aleksey Korotkov ru
- German Korotkov ru
- Ivan Korotkov ru
- Konstantin Korotkov ru
- Mikhail Korotkov ru
- Pyotr Korochkin ru
- Vladimir Korsakov ru
- Nikolai Korsakov ru
- Pyotr Korsakov ru
- Nikolai Korsun ru
- Volf Korsunsky ru
- Aleksey Kortunov ru
- Ivan Korunov ru
- Ivan Korchagin
- Lev Korchagin ru
- Iosif Korchak ru
- Pavel Korchmaryuk ru
- Konstantin Korshunov ru
- Pavel Korshunov ru
- Sergey Korshunovich ru
- Pyotr Koryshev ru
- Gennady Koryukin ru
- Aleksandr Koryavin ru
- Ivan Koryavko ru
- Pyotr Koryagin ru
- Disan Koryazin ru
- Aleksandr Koryakov ru
- Vasily Koryakov ru
- Ivan Koryakovsky ru
- Karp Koryachko ru
- Alikbai Kosaev ru
- Aleksandr Kosarev ru
- Andrey Kosarev ru
- Vladimir Kosarev ru
- Vladimir Kosachyov ru
- Pyotr Kosenko ru
- Yuri Kosenko ru
- Ivan Kosenkov ru
- Pyotr Kosenkov ru
- Vladimir Kosinov ru
- Semyon Kosinov ru
- Aleksandr Kositsyn ru
- Feodosy Kosmach ru
- Mikhail Kosmachyov ru
- Zoya Kosmodemyanskaya
- Aleksandr Kosmodemyansky
- Vasily Kosov ru
- Viktor Kosov ru
- Daniil Kosov ru
- Yakov Kosovichev ru
- Valentin Kosolapov ru
- Viktor Kosolapov ru
- Filipp Kosolapov ru
- Lev Kosonogov ru
- Vladimir Kosorukov ru
- Mikhail Kossa ru
- Anton Kostenko ru
- Grigoru Kostenko ru
- Mikhail Kostenko ru
- Pavel Kostenko ru
- Fyodor Kostenko ru
- Semyon Kosterin ru
- Pyotr Kostetsky ru
- Fyodor Kostikov ru
- Yuri Kostikov ru
- Aleksandr Kostin ru
- Aleksey Kostin ru
- Vaisly Kostin ru
- Viktor Kostin ru
- Ivan Dmitrievich Kostin ru
- Ivan Ivanovich Kostin ru
- Leonid Kostin ru
- Fyodor Kostin ru
- Yegor Kostitsyn ru
- Viktor Kostousov ru
- Afanasy Kostrikin ru
- Vladimir Kostrikin ru
- Sergey Kostritsky ru
- Pyotr Kostrov ru
- Stanislav Kostrov ru
- Pyotr Kostromtsov ru
- Nikolai Kostryukov ru
- Aleksandr Kostylev ru
- Georgy Kostylev ru
- Yevgeny Kostylyov ru
- Tatyana Kostyrina
- Stepan Kostychev ru
- Andrey Kostyuk ru
- Iosif Kostyuk ru
- Fyodor Kostyuk ru
- Mikhail Kostyukov ru
- Pyotr Kostyukov ru
- Pyotr Kostyuchenko ru
- Boris Kostyakov ru
- Yevgeny Kosmin ru
- Ivan Kosyak ru
- Sergey Kosyakin ru
- Mikhail Kosyakov ru
- Aleksey Kot ru
- Vasily Kot ru
- Viktor Kot ru
- Fyodor Kotanov ru
- Aleksey Kotegov ru
- Aleksandr Kotelkov ru
- Aleksey Kotelnikov ru
- Mikhail Kotelnikov ru
- Nikolai Kotelnikov ru
- Yakov Kotelnikov ru
- Valentin Kotyk
- Nikolai Kotkov ru
- Anatoly Kotkov ru
- Vasily Kotkov ru
- Nikolai Kotkov ru
- Mikhail Kotlovets ru
- Ivan Kotlyar ru
- Leonty Kotlyar ru
- Feodosy Kotlyar ru
- Boris Kotlyarsky ru
- Aleksandr Aleksandrovich Kotov ru
- Aleksandr Grigorievich Kotov ru
- Boris Kotov ru
- Vladimir Kotov ru
- Georgy Kotov ru
- Yevgeny Kotov ru
- Ivan Vasilyevich Kotov ru
- Ivan Ilyich Kotov ru
- Ivan Mikhailovich Kotov ru
- Ilya Kotov ru
- Mikhail Kotov ru
- Nikita Kotov ru
- Nikolai Kotov ru
- Sergey Kotov ru
- Yakov Kotov ru
- Aleksandr Kottsov ru
- Fyodor Kotchenko ru
- Vasily Kotyunin ru
- Sergey Kokhanovich ru
- Nikolai Kokhov ru
- Grigory Kotseba ru
- Tikhon Kotsyubinsky ru
- Yuri Kochelaevsky ru
- Pavel Kocherga ru
- Grigoru Kochergin ru
- Yegor Kochergin ru
- Fyodor Kochergin ru
- Vasily Kocherov ru
- Viktor Kocherov ru
- Aleksey Kochetkov ru
- Andrey Kochetkov ru
- Grigoru Kochetkov ru
- Mikhail Kochetkov ru
- Nikolai Pavlovich Kochetkov ru
- Nikolai Yakovlevich Kochetkov ru
- Stepan Kochetkov ru
- Aleksandr Kochetov
- Vasily Kochetov ru
- Ivan Kochetov ru
- Mikhail Kochetov ru
- Konstantin Kochiev ru
- Nikolai Kochmaryov ru
- Vladimir Kochnev ru
- Ivan Kochnev ru
- Aleksey Kochubarov ru
- Nikolai Koshaev ru
- Ali Koshev ru
- Oleg Koshevoy
- Pyotr Koshevoy (twice)
- Fyodor Koshevoy ru
- Andrey Koshelev ru
- Vasily Koshelev ru
- Vladimir Koshelev ru
- Ivan Koshelev ru
- Mikhail Koshelev ru
- Nikolai Vasilyevich Koshelev ru
- Nikolai Ivanovich Koshelev ru
- Pyotr Koshelev ru
- Stepan Koshel ru
- Fyodor Koshel ru
- Boris Koshechkin ru
- Grigoru Koshkarov ru
- Aleksey Koshkin ru
- Andrey Koshkin ru
- Kirill Koshman ru
- Mikhail Koshmanov ru
- Georgy Koshmyak ru
- Veniamin Koshukov ru
- Pavel Koshcheyev ru
- Lyudmila Kravets
- Mikhail Kravets ru
- Mordukh Kravets ru
- Pyotr Kravets ru
- Aleksey Kravtsov ru
- Boris Kravtsov
- Grigory Kravtsov ru
- Dmitry Kravtsov ru
- Yefim Kravtsov ru
- Ivan Konsratevich Kravtsov ru
- Ivan Savelevich Kravtsov ru
- Ilya Kravtsov ru
- Nikolai Kravtsov ru
- Olgerd Kravtsov ru
- Aleksandr Kravchenko ru
- Andrey Grigoryevich Kravchenko (twice)
- Andrey Ilyich Kravchenko ru
- Vasily Ivanovich Kravchenko (1923–1944) ru
- Vasily Ivanovich Kravchenko (1924–1982) ru
- Vasily Fyodorovich Kravchenko ru
- Vladimir Kravchenko ru
- Grigory Kravchenko (twice)
- Ivan Khotovich Kravchenko ru
- Ivan Yakovlevich Kravchenko
- Mikhail Kravchenko ru
- Nikolai Kravchenko ru
- Sergey Kravchenko ru
- Fyodor Iosifovich Kravchenko ru
- Fyodor Tikhonovich Kravchenko ru
- Vladimir Kraev ru
- Nikolai Kraev ru
- Aleksey Kraiko ru
- Nikolai Kraynev ru
- Aleksandr Kraynov ru
- Ivan Kraynov ru
- Stepan Kraynov ru
- Tikhon Kralya ru
- Andrey Kramarenko ru
- Grigory Kramarenko ru
- Sergey Kramarenko
- Grigory Kramarchuk ru
- Stepan Kramar ru
- Ivan Kramchaninov ru
- Nikita Krapiva ru
- Aristarkh Krapivin ru
- Yakov Krapivin ru
- Fyodor Krapivny ru
- Konstantin Krasavin
- Mikhail Krasavin ru
- Semyon Krasy ru
- Aleksandr Krasikov ru
- Ivan Krasikov ru
- Nikolai Krasikov ru
- Aleksandr Krasilov ru
- Aleksey Krasilov ru
- Aleksey Krasilnikov ru
- Gennady Krasilnikov ru
- Ivan Krasilnikov ru
- Nikolai Krasilnikov ru
- Ivan Mikhailovich Krasnik ru
- Ivan Yakovlevich Krasnik ru
- Anatoly Krasnov ru
- Viktor Krasnov ru
- Zosim Krasnov ru
- Ivan Krasnov ru
- Nikolai Ivanovich Krasnov ru
- Nikolai Petrovich Krasnov ru
- Nikolai Fyodorovich Krasnov
- Nikolai Krasnovsky ru
- Aleksey Krasnokutsky ru
- Konstantin Krasnokutsky ru
- Khaim Krasnokutsky ru
- Mitrofan Krasnolutsky ru
- Sergey Krasnopyorov ru
- Ivan Krasnoselsky ru
- Ivan Krasnoyurchenko ru
- Klavdy Krasnoyarov ru
- Aleksandr Krasnukhin ru
- Ivan Krasnyukov ru
- Viktor Krasov ru
- Stepan Krasovsky
- Georgy Krasota ru
- Yevgeny Krasutsky ru
- Semyon Kratinov ru
- Dmitry Kratov ru
- Alekseu Krakhmal ru
- Ivan Krasheninnikov ru
- Igor Kreizer ru
- Yakov Kreizer
- Nikolsi Kremenish ru
- Simon Kremer ru
- Yevgeny Kremlyov ru
- Ilya Kremok ru
- Ernst Krenkel
- Nikolai Kreptsov-Zaichenko ru
- Pyotr Krestyaninov ru
- Tikhon Kretinin ru
- Aleksandr Kretov ru
- Nikolai Kretov ru
- Stepan Kretov (twice)
- Andrey Krechetov ru
- Vasily Krechetov ru
- Ivan Krivenko ru
- Nikolai Krivenko ru
- Semyon Krivenko ru
- Fedosy Krivenko ru
- Pyotr Kriven ru
- Aleksandr Krivets ru
- Nikolai Krivov ru
- Yevgeny Krivoy ru
- Pavel Krivokorytov ru
- Grigoru Krivolapov ru
- Nikolai Krivolutsky ru
- Aleksandr Krivonos ru
- Aleksey Krivonos ru
- Nikolai Krivonos ru
- Pavel Krivonos ru
- Vladimir Krivorotov ru
- Mikhail Krivorotov ru
- Sergey Krivorotchenko ru
- Aleksey Krivoruchenko ru
- Tikhon Krivoukhov ru
- Georgy Krivokhizhin ru
- Arkady Krivoshapkin ru
- Yefim Krivosheyev ru
- Semyon Krivoshein
- Aleksey Krivoshchyokov ru
- Sergey Krivtsov ru
- Sergey Krikalev
- Vasily Kriklivy ru
- Vasily Krikun ru
- Veniamin Krikunenko ru
- Nikolai Krisanov ru
- Ilya Krichevsky ru
- Arsenty Krishtal ru
- Pyotr Krovko ru
- Albert Kronit ru
- Mikhail Kropotov ru
- Boris Krotov ru
- Mikhail Krotov ru
- Fyodor Krotov ru
- Vyacheslav Krott ru
- Vasily Krotyuk ru
- Anatoly Krokhalyov ru
- Nikita Kruglikov ru
- Vasily Kruglov ru
- Leonid Kruglov ru
- Nikolai Kruglov ru
- Pavel Kruglov ru
- Vasily Kruzhalov ru
- Ivan Krumin ru
- Andrey Krupin ru
- Pyotr Krupinov ru
- Viktor Krupsky ru
- Pavel Krupsky ru
- Dmitry Krutikov ru
- Ivan Krutikov ru
- Lavrenty Krutilenko ru
- Pyotr Krutov ru
- Aleksey Krutogolov ru
- Andrey Krutoshinsky ru
- Sevastyan Kruchyonykh ru
- Vladimir Kruchinin ru
- Mikhail Krygin ru
- Vasily Krylov ru
- Nikolai Ivanovich Krylov (twice)
- Nikolai Nikolayevich Krylov (1918–1980) ru
- Nikolai Nikolayevich Krylov (1922–1985) ru
- Pavel Krylov ru
- Fyodor Gavrilovich Krylov ru
- Fyodor Mikhailovich Krylov ru
- Mikhail Krymov ru
- Stepan Krynin ru
- Arseny Krysyuk ru
- Vasily Krushkin ru
- Aleksandr Kryukov ru
- Vasily Kryukov ru
- Vladimir Kryukov
- Ivan Kryukov ru
- Konstantin Kryukov ru
- Nikolai Kryukov ru
- Pavel Kryukov ru
- Pyotr Kryukov ru
- Vladimir Kryuchenko ru
- Abram Kryuchkov ru
- Vasily Kryuchkov ru
- Ivan Kryuchkov ru
- Fyodor Kryuchkov ru
- Vasily Kryazhev ru
- Sergey Kryzhanovsky ru
- Aniela Krzywoń
- Grigory Kzendzov ru
- Aleksandr Kuzmich Ksenofontov ru
- Aleksandr Sergeyevich Ksenofontov ru
- Aleksey Ksynkin ru
- Timiray Kubakaev ru
- Vasily Krbarev ru
- Valery Kubasov
- Alekseu Kublitsky ru
- Pavel Kubyshkin ru
- Georgy Kubyshko ru
- Aleksandr Kuvashev ru
- Leonid Kuversky ru
- Ivan Kuvika ru
- Ivan Kuvin ru
- Aleksandr Kuvshinov ru
- Leonid Kuvshinov ru
- Lev Kudakovsky ru
- Pyotr Kudar ru
- Mikhail Kudachkin ru
- Idris Kudashev ru
- Ivan Kudashkin ru
- Vladimir Kudashov
- Georgy Kudashov ru
- Afanasy Kudersky ru
- Pavel Kudimov ru
- Ivan Kudin ru
- Dmitry Kudinov ru
- Andrey Kudrevtov ru
- Vladimir Kudrin ru
- Dmiry Kudrin ru
- Ivan Kudrin ru
- Roman Kudrin ru
- Ivan Kudrya ru
- Nikolai Kudrya ru
- David Kudyavitsky ru
- Aleksandr Georgievich Kudryavtsev ru
- Aleksandr Sergeyevich Kudryavtsev ru
- Viktor Kudryavtsev ru
- Nikifor Kudryavtsev ru
- Nikolai Kudryavtsev ru
- Sergey Kudryavtsev ru
- Gerasim Kudryashev ru
- Vladimir Kudryashov ru
- Konstantin Kudryashov ru
- Nikolai Kudryashov ru
- Sergey Kudryashov ru
- Murat Kuzhakov ru
- Stepan Kuzakov ru
- Gennady Kuzenko ru
- Ivan Kuzyonov ru
- Aleksandr Grigoryevich Kuzin ru
- Aleksey Kuzin ru
- Ivan Kuzin ru
- Ilya Kuzin ru
- Mikhail Kuzminov ru
- Aleksandr Aleksandrovich Kuznetsov ru
- Aleksandr Alekseyevich Kuznetsov ru
- Aleksandr Mikhailovich Kuznetsov ru
- Aleksandr Nikolayevich Kuznetsov ru
- Aleksey Ivanovich Kuznetsov ru
- Aleksey Kirillovich Kuznetsov ru
- Anatoly Ivanovich Kuznetsov ru
- Anatoly Semyonovich Kuznetsov ru
- Boris Kirillovich Kuznetsov ru
- Boris Lvovich Kuznetsov ru
- Vasily Aleksandrovich Kuznetsov ru
- Vasily Grigorievich Kuznetsov ru
- Vasily Ivanovich Kuznetsov
- Vasily Mikhailovich Kuznetsov ru
- Viktor Ignatevich Kuznetsov ru
- Viktor Pavlovich Kuznetsov ru
- Viktor Petrovich Kuznetsov ru
- Vladimir Kuznetsov ru
- Georgy Andreyevich Kuznetsov ru
- Georgy Antonovich Kuznetsov ru
- Georgy Stepanovich Kuznetsov ru
- Grigory Dmitrivich Kuznetsov ru
- Girgory Ilyich Kuznetsov ru
- Grigory Matveyevich Kuznetsov ru
- Dmitry Arakadevich Kuznetsov ru
- Dmitry Ignatevich Kuznetsov ru
- Yevgeny Kuznetsov ru
- Ivan Aleksandrovich Kuznetsov ru
- Ivan Alekseyevich Kuznetsov ru
- Ivan Ivanovich Kuznetsov ru
- Ivan Lazarevich Kuznetsov ru
- Ivan Mikhailovich Kuznetsov ru
- Ivan Petrovich Kuznetsov ru
- Ivan Fyodorovich Kuznetsov ru
- Innokenty Kuznetsov ru
- Kirill Kuznetsov ru
- Konstantin Gavrilovich Kuznetsov ru
- Konstantin Grigorievich Kuznetsov ru
- Leonid Kuznetsov ru
- Mikhail Arsentevich Kuznetsov ru
- Mikhail Vasilyevich Kuznetsov
- Mikhail Mikhailovich Kuznetsov ru
- Mikhail Petrovich Kuznetsov ru
- Mikhail Tikhonovich Kuznetsov ru
- Nikolai Aleksandrovich Kuznetsov ru
- Nikolai Alekseyevich Kuznetsov ru
- Nikolai Anatolevich Kuznetsov ru
- Nikolai Vasilyevich Kuznetsov (1912–1993) ru
- Nikolai Vasilyevich Kuznetsov (1921–1945) ru
- Nikolai Gersimovich Kuznetsov
- Nikolai Ivanovich Kuznetsov
- Nikolai Ivanovich Kuznetsov (spy)
- Nikolai Leontevich Kuznetsov ru
- Nikolai Pavlovich Kuznetsov (artilleryman) ru
- Nikolai Pavlovich Kuznetsov (pilot) ru
- Nikolai Fyodorovich Kuznetsov ru
- Pavel Dmitrievich Kuznetsov ru
- Pavel Yefimovich Kuznetsov ru
- Pavel Ivanovich Kuznetsov ru
- Pyotr Grigorievich Kuznetsov ru
- Pyotr Ivanovich Kuznetsov
- Pyotr Nifontovich Kuznetsov ru
- Sergey Alekseyevich Kuznetsov ru
- Sergey Yegorovich Kuznetsov ru
- Sergey Trofimovich Kuznetsov ru
- Stepan Matveyevich Kuznetsov ru
- Stepan Nikiforovich Kuznetsov ru
- Tikhon Kuznetsov ru
- Fyodor Kuznetsov ru
- Eduard Kuznetsov ru
- Yuri Kuznetsov
- Demyan Kuzov ru
- Ivan Kuzovkov ru
- Miron Kuzovlev ru
- Anatoly Kuzovnikov ru
- Pavel Kuzub ru
- Grigory Kuzmenko ru
- Ivan Panteleyevich Kuzmenko ru
- Ivan Prokofevich Kuzmenko ru
- Nikolai Kuzmenko ru
- Anatoly Ivanovich Kuzmin ru
- Anatoly Naumovich Kuzmin ru
- Valentin Kuzmin ru
- Vasily Mikhailovich Kuzmin ru
- Vasily Stepanovich Kuzmin ru
- Vasily Fyodorovich Kuzmin ru
- Viktor Kuzmin ru
- Georgy Kuzmin ru
- Dmitry Kuzmin ru
- Ivan Kuzmin ru
- Ilyich Kuzmin ru
- Matvey Kuzmin
- Mikhail Aleksandrovich Kuzmin ru
- Mikhail Kuzmich Kuzmin ru
- Mikhail Mikhailovich Kuzmin ru
- Nikolai Kuzmin ru
- Sergey Kuzmin ru
- Fyodor Kuzmin ru
- Vasily Kuzminov ru
- Vasily Kuzminov ru
- Ivan Muzminov ru
- Ivan Kuzminykh ru
- Vasily Kuzmichyov ru
- Ivan Kuzmichyov ru
- Gavriil Kuzyakin ru
- Marvey Kuzyakin ru
- Vasily Kuk ru
- Ivan Kukarin ru
- Aleksey Kukin ru
- Arkady Kukin ru
- Roman Kuklev ru
- Leonid Kukolevsky ru
- Pyotr Kuksov ru
- Sergey Kukunin ru
- Viktor Kukushkin ru
- Valentin Kulabukhov ru
- Andrey Kulagin
- Valery Kulakov ru
- Konstantin Kulakov ru
- Nikolai Kulakov
- Pyotr Kulakov ru
- Teodor Kulakov
- Nikolai Kulebyaev ru
- Pavel Kuleykin ru
- Boris Kulemin ru
- Anatoly Kuleshov ru
- Vladimir Ivanovich Kuleshov ru
- Vladimir Kuzmich Kuleshov ru
- Ivan Kuleshov ru
- Konstanin Kuleshov ru
- Pavel Kuleshov ru
- Stepan Kuleshov ru
- Pyotr Kulizhsky ru
- Aleksandr Kulik ru
- Afanasy Kulik ru
- Grigory Ivanovich Kulik
- Grigory Karpovich Kulik ru
- Ilya Kulik ru
- Iosif Kulik ru
- Konstantin Kulik ru
- Tsaezar Kulikov
- Aleksey Kulikov ru
- Vasily Ivanovich Kulikov (1921–1943) ru
- Vasily Ivanovich Kulikov (1923–1991) ru
- Viktor Georgievich Kulikov ru
- Viktor Nikolayevich Kulikov
- Ivan Kulikov ru
- Nikolai Alekseyevich Kulikov ru
- Nikolai Ivanovich Kulikov ru
- Sergey Kulikov ru
- Fyodor Alekseyevich Kulikov ru
- Fyodor Fyodorovich Kulikov ru
- Ivan Kulichev ru
- Yakov Kulishev ru
- Pavel Kulyk ru
- Pyotr Kulbaka ru
- Sidor Kulbashnoy ru
- Aleksey Kulbyakin ru
- Helene Kullman
- Andrey Kulnev ru
- Fyodor Kultin ru
- Nikolai Kulchitsky ru
- Aleksandr Kulyasov ru
- Pavel Kumanyov ru
- Aleksandr Kumanichkin ru
- Viktor Kumskov ru
- Khalmurza Kumukov ru
- Grigoru Kunavin ru
- Yevgeny Kungurtsev (twice)
- Yakov Kunder ru
- Aleksandr Kunets ru
- Zamakhshyari Kunizh
- Tsezar Kunikov
- Aleksey Kunitsa ru
- Semyon Kunitsa ru
- Pyotr Kunitsyn ru
- Izrail Kupershtein ru
- Ivan Kupin ru
- Fyodor Kupin ru
- Aleksey Kupriyanov ru
- Dmitry Kupriyanov ru
- Pavel Kupriyanov ru
- Pyotr Kupriyanov ru
- Semyon Kupriyanov ru
- Smitry Kuptsov ru
- Sergey Kuptsov ru
- Grigory Kupchin ru
- Vladimir Kurakin ru
- Gavrila Kurakin ru
- Nikolai Kurakin ru
- Pyotr Kurasanov ru
- Vasily Kurasov ru
- Vladimir Kurasov
- Vladimir Kurachinsky ru
- Afanasy Kurbaev ru
- Aleksey Kurbanov ru
- Akhmedzhan Kurbanov ru
- Sumen Kurbanov ru
- Vasily Kurbatov ru
- Georgy Kurbatov ru
- Mikhail Kurbatov ru
- IvanAndreyevich Kurgansky ru
- Ivan Danilovich Kurgansky ru
- Yuri Kurguzov ru
- Nikolai Kurdov ru
- Ivan Kurenkov ru
- Aleksandr Kurzenkov ru
- Sergey Kurzenko ru
- Vladimir Kurilenko ru
- Vladimir Ilyich Kurilov ru
- Vladimir Nikonorovich Kurilov ru
- Aleksey Kurin ru
- Lyudvig Kurist ru
- Aleksandr Kurko ru
- Vasily Kurkov ru
- Nikolai Kurkov ru
- Stepan Kurkov ru
- Semyon Kurkotkin
- Yuri Kurlin ru
- Dmitry Kurluk ru
- Vadim Kurmanin ru
- Akan Kurmanov ru
- Sergey Kurnaev ru
- Nikolai Kuroedov ru
- Nikolai Kuropatkin ru
- Dmitry Kuropyatnik ru
- Grigory Kuropyatnikov ru
- Vladimir Kurochkin ru
- Yefim Kurochkin ru
- Pavel Kurochkin
- Timofey Kurochkin ru
- Boris Kurtsev ru
- David Kuryzhov ru
- Ivan Kuryatnik ru
- Nikolai Kuryatnikov ru
- Konstantin Kuryachy ru
- Tagir Kusimov
- Viktor Kuskov ru
- Aleksey Kustov ru
- Viktor Kustov ru
- Ivan Kustov ru
- Igor Kustov ru
- Fyodor Kustov ru
- Pavel Kutakhov (twice)
- Mikhail Kuteynikov ru
- Nikolai Kutenko ru
- Pavel Kutepov ru
- Aleksey Kutin ru
- Ivan Kutinov ru
- Andrey Kutovoy ru
- Konstantin Kutrukhin ru
- Rauf Kutuev ru
- Ivan Kuturga ru
- Nikolai Kutyntsev ru
- Sergey Kufonin ru
- Grigory Kukharev ru
- Ivan Kukharev ru
- Fyodor Kukharev ru
- Nikolai Kukharenko ru
- Konstantin Kukharov ru
- Aleksandr Kuts ru
- Timofey Kutsevalov ru
- Ivan Kutsenko ru
- Aleksandr Kucherenko ru
- Vladimir Kucherenko ru
- Ivan Kucherenko ru
- Nikolai Kucherenko ru
- Pyotr Kucherov ru
- Frants Kucherov ru
- Tikhon Kucheryaba ru
- Mikhail Kucheryavenko ru
- Viktor Kucheryavy ru
- Gerasim Kucheryavy ru
- Nikolai Kucheryany ru
- Mikhail Kuchinsky
- Gennady Kuchkin ru
- Aleksandr Kuchumov ru
- Pavel Kuchumov ru
- Rostislav Kushlyansky ru
- Mikhail Kushnov ru
- Ivan Kushtin ru
- Aleksandr Kushchev ru
- Mikhail Kuyukov ru
- Pyotr Ktsoev ru
- Aleksandr Kshensky ru
- Mikhail Kyrchanov ru
- Fyodor Kytin ru
- Panteley Kyanzhin ru
