= Viktor Kazakov =

Viktor Kazakov may refer to:

- Viktor Kazakov (lieutenant) (1923–1995), Soviet lieutenant and Hero of the Soviet Union
- Viktor Kazakov (soldier) (1925–1995), Soviet soldier, full bearer of the Order of Glory
- Viktor Kazakov (politician) (born 1949), Russian politician
