= Kruchyonykh =

Kruchyonykh is a Russian surname.

- Aleksei Kruchyonykh, Russian futurist poet and artist
- Sevastyan Kruchyonykh (1909–1975), Soviet military pilot
