= Zamakhshyari Kunizh =

Soviet soldier (1916–1992)

- Born: 5 December 1916; Psyzh, Kuban Oblast, Russian Empire (now Abazinsky District, Karachay-Cherkessia, Russia)
- Died: 8 April 1992 (aged 75); Psyzh, Abazinsky District, Karachay-Cherkessia, Russia
- Military career
- Allegiance: Soviet Union
- Branch: Red Army (Infantry)
- Service years: 1937–1942
- Rank: Krasnoarmeets (Private)
- Units: 300th Rifle Regiment; 7th Rifle Division; 7th Army
- Conflicts: Soviet invasion of Poland; Winter War; World War II
- Awards: Hero of the Soviet Union; Order of Lenin; Order of the Patriotic War 1st class

Zamakhshyari Kunizh (Kabardian: Къуныжъ Уэсмэн ыкъуэ Зэмахьшэри; Russian: Замахшяри Османович Кунижев; 5 December 1916 – 8 April 1992) was a Red Army krasnoarmeets (private) who fought in the Soviet invasion of Poland, the Winter War, and World War II. He was awarded the title of Hero of the Soviet Union in 1940 for his actions during the Winter War.

== Biography ==
Zamakhshyari Kunizhev was born on 5 December 1916 in the aul of Psyzh (now in the Abazinsky District of Karachay-Cherkessia) to a peasant family. After completing primary school and tractor driver courses, he worked in his specialty on a kolkhoz, (collective farm).

In 1937, Kunizhev was drafted into the Red Army. He participated in the Soviet invasion of Poland and the Soviet-Finnish War. During the latter, he served as a machine gunner in the 300th Rifle Regiment of the 7th Rifle Division (7th Army, Northwestern Front).

He took part in breaking through the Mannerheim Line. In March 1940, while stealthily advancing to new positions as part of a vanguard detachment, Kunizhev discovered a Finnish command post. He destroyed it with machine-gun fire, killing approximately 50 enemy soldiers and officers, and captured a Finnish general.

By a decree of the Presidium of the Supreme Soviet of the USSR on 11 April 1940, for the "exemplary performance of combat missions of the command on the front of the struggle against the Finnish White Guards and the courage and heroism displayed," Krasnoarmeets Zamakhshyari Kunizhev was awarded the title of Hero of the Soviet Union, along with the Order of Lenin and the "Gold Star" medal (No. 342).

He subsequently studied at the Minsk Tank School. From June 1941, he fought on the fronts of World War II, but in August of that year, he was sent to study at the 3rd Saratov Tank School. In January 1942, he was forced to leave his studies due to illness. By April 1942, he was medically discharged from military service.

He returned to his homeland, which soon fell under German occupation. He was arrested by the German authorities and subjected to torture, but was later released following the pleas of his fellow villagers. His "Gold Star" medal and Order of Lenin were stolen by local collaborators (politsai). Following the liberation of the Karachay-Cherkess Autonomous Oblast, Kunizhev worked on a kolkhoz.

In 1944, he was arrested by the NKVD on charges of high treason. On 23 August 1944, Kunizhev was sentenced to 10 years in corrective labor camps with a loss of civil rights for 3 years. By a decree of the Presidium of the Supreme Soviet of the USSR on 8 March 1950, he was stripped of all his military ranks and awards.

Kunizhev was released from the camps in 1954. He returned to Psyzh and resumed work on a kolkhoz.

By a resolution of the Criminal Cases Collegium of the Supreme Court of the Soviet Union on 29 November 1971, the verdict against Kunizhev was overturned, and the case was dismissed due to the lack of corpus delicti. By a decree of the Presidium of the Supreme Soviet of the USSR on 2 August 1972, the order stripping him of his ranks and awards was officially revoked.

In 1972, Kunizhev retired on a pension. He died on 8 April 1992.

== Memorials ==
Annual All-Russian youth judo tournaments are held in Cherkessk, the capital of Karachay-Cherkessia, in memory of Hero of the Soviet Union Z. O. Kunizhev. These tournaments feature the strongest judokas from the North Caucasus and other Russian regions.

== Awards ==
- Hero of the Soviet Union (11 April 1940; stripped 8 March 1950, restored 2 August 1972)
- Order of Lenin (11 April 1940; stripped 8 March 1950, restored 2 August 1972)
- Order of the Patriotic War 1st class (1985)

== See also ==
- List of Heroes of the Soviet Union

== Bibliography ==
- Zvyagintsev, V. E. (2007). Прокляты и забыты [Damned and Forgotten] (in Russian). Moscow.
- Shkadov, Ivan (1987). Герои Советского Союза: Краткий биографический словарь [Heroes of the Soviet Union: A Brief Biographical Dictionary] (in Russian). Vol. 1. Moscow: Voenizdat.
