= Fyodor Kozlov =

Soviet serial killer and rapist (1959-1990)

- Born: Fyodor Nikolayevich Kozlov; 9 April 1959; Semiyarsk, Semipalatinsk Oblast, Kazakh SSR (present-day East Kazakhstan, Kazakhstan)
- Died: 1 September 1990 (aged 31); SIZO-1, Novosibirsk, Novosibirsk Oblast, RSFSR
- Cause of death: Suicide by hanging
- Other names: "The Iskitim Maniac" "The Novosibirsk Satan" "The Monster of Lozhok"
- Convictions: Murder x7 Attempted murder x5
- Penalty: 10 years (1976); Death (1989)

Details
- Victims: 7
- Span of crimes: 1976–1989
- Country: Soviet Union
- States: Rostov, Novosibirsk, Omsk
- Date apprehended: 1 September 1989

Fyodor Nikolayevich Kozlov (Russian: Фёдор Николаевич Козлов; 9 April 1959 – 1 September 1990), known as The Iskitim Maniac (Russian: Искитимский маньяк), was a Soviet serial killer and rapist who committed a series of murders in three oblasts from 1976 to 1989. Convicted and sentenced to death for these crimes, he hanged himself in prison before the verdict could be carried out.

== Early life and first murders ==
Fyodor Nikolayevich Kozlov was born on 9 April 1959, in the village of Semiyarsk, Semipalatinsk Oblast in the Kazakh SSR (now part of East Kazakhstan, Kazakhstan). Shortly after his birth, the family moved to Rostov Oblast in the RSFSR, where Kozlov spent his childhood and adolescence. Due to his introverted nature, he was unpopular with fellow students and considered a social outcast, and in the mid-1970s, he lost all interest in pursuing his education, causing a rift between him and his parents.

As a teenager, Kozlov started acting aggressively and showed possible signs of mental illness, so in early 1976, the 17-year-old was placed in the care of his grandmother. This did not improve his mental state, and not long after, Kozlov proceeded to rape his 11-year-old third cousin during a psychotic break. His grandmother eventually entered the room and tried to stop him, causing Kozlov to grab a nearby axe and hack to death both her and his third cousin.

Kozlov was swiftly arrested after the murders, and by the end of 1976, he was convicted and sentenced to 10 years imprisonment, the maximum available penalty since he was still a minor at the time. After serving out his sentence in full, Kozlov was released in 1986 and moved to the Novosibirsk Oblast, where he soon married a woman with whom he had been pen pals while imprisoned. The couple soon had a child, and Kozlov got a job as a welder. Not long after, however, his wife decided to temporarily move in back with her parents in the village of Evsino, while Kozlov stayed behind in Lozhok.

== Murders ==
Shortly after his release on 16 June 1989, Kozlov committed his first murder. While returning home from work, he passed by the village's train station when he saw 18-year-old saleswoman Natalya Rodnikova walking along a dirt road, ostensibly to shorten her walk to her home village of Linyovo. Kozlov caught up with her and, at knifepoint, dragged Rodnikova deep into the woods, raped and stabbed her to death. That same night, after much deliberation, Kozlov returned to the crime scene, threw some branches over Rodnikova's body and then set it on fire in an attempt to destroy the evidence. The woman's charred remains were found on the next day by her father, who recognized her by the unburned clothing and shoes. Kozlov, as a convicted violent felon, was immediately considered a suspect by police - however, since he now supposedly led a law-abiding lifestyle; was not known to drink alcohol and had a positive work record, he was eventually written off as a suspect.

In early July 1989, while on an assignment in Iskitim, Kozlov accidentally had his foot run over by 12-year-old local girl Masha Dorofeeva while she was riding her bicycle. After showing her his shock worker's permit (which, in reality, belonged to his mother-in-law), Kozlov introduced himself as a policeman and lured Dorofeeva to an abandoned two-storey house near a heater-manufacturing plant. In there, he tied her up with a white ribbon and put a gag of plaster in her mouth before raping and stabbing Dorofeeva in the neck using a knife. He ultimately set her body on fire.

A few days later, Kozlov attacked a 19-year-old girl in Iskitim, but she managed to escape his clutches. According to her testimony, she was approached by him on the beach while there were few onlookers around, ostensibly to ask her to buy him a cigarette. He then attacked her and attempted to tie her hands with a white ribbon, but the girl used his slim physique to free herself from her restraints and flee. Utilizing her description, authorities made a facial composite of the attacker and spread it around every major newspaper in Novosibirsk Oblast.

After a number of unsuccessful attacks, Kozlov decided that it would be a good idea to attempt to throw the investigators off and commit crimes elsewhere. In early August he moved to Novosibirsk where, after wandering the streets for a few hours, he attacked, raped and killed a random 18-year-old girl he bumped into. In order to destroy any evidence that linked him to the crime, he covered the body with branches and then set it alight. A few days later, using the same tactic, he raped and killed a 24-year-old woman whose body he also set on fire. Following this attack, police presence in the city was strengthened and a number of undercover agents were dispatched in an attempt to catch the killer in the act.

By mid-August, Kozlov took a leave from work and went to Omsk, Omsk Oblast, where his wife's relatives lived. On 21 August, while out on a walk through the city, he encountered an 11-year-old girl that he found suitable as a victim. Like with his previous killings, he tied her hands with a white ribbon and put a gag of plaster in her mouth before proceeding to rape and stab her in the neck with a knife, ultimately setting her corpse on fire. The way in which the victim was killed immediately caught the attention of investigators from Novosibirsk Oblast, who deduced that it was likely committed by same perpetrator as the one in their jurisdiction. Soon after, a joint operation was launched in order to apprehend him.

== Arrest, trial, and suicide ==
At the end of August, Kozlov returned to Novosibirsk Oblast and attempted to resume his attacks. On 1 September, he was at the railway station in Berdsk when he assaulted a random woman - to his shock, however, she fiercely resisted and managed to attract the attention of passers-by by screaming. Kozlov was forced to flee after two firefighters attempted to apprehend him, but he managed to slip away.

During a subsequent interview with authorities, the woman described her attacker in detail, and after being shown a picture of several known felons, she identified Kozlov as her assailant. That same day, police officers arrested him at the bus station in Berdsk. While searching through his clothes and personal items, investigators found a knife, a white ribbon, a band-aid and a bus ticket for Omsk. Soon after his arrest, Kozlov confessed to committing five murders and five attempted murders.

Eventually, he was put on trial for the murders, and on 23 April 1990, the Novosibirsk Regional Court found him guilty on all counts and sentenced him to death. After the trial, Kozlov was transferred to the death row in SIZO-1 in Novosibirsk. Before the sentence could be carried out, he hanged himself in prison on 1 September 1990.

== See also ==
- List of Russian serial killers
