= Ilya Kaplunov =

Sailor of the Soviet Union

- Native name: Каплунов Илья Макарович
- Born: 8 July 1918; Chapushka
- Died: 18 December 1942 (aged 23) Verkhnekumsky farm
- Allegiance: Soviet Union
- Branch: 2nd Guards Army
- Service years: 1938–1942
- Rank: sailor
- Conflicts: World War II (DOW)
- Awards: Hero of the Soviet Union

Kaplunov Ilya Makarovich (July 8, 1918, Chapushka, Saratov Governorate - December 18, 1942, Verkhnekumsky farm, Stalingrad Oblast) was a sailor and gunner of an anti-tank rifle of the 4th Infantry Regiment of the 98th Infantry Division of the 2nd Guards Army of the Stalingrad Front, Hero of the Soviet Union.

== Early life ==
He was born on July 8, 1918, in Chapushka, Balashovsky district (now the Arkadaksky District of the Saratov Oblast).

He graduated from the Arkadak secondary school. He worked as a laborer at an oil refinery, as a mechanic and a hammerer at an agricultural school.

In 1938 he was drafted, serving in naval aviation in the Pacific Fleet.

In October 1941, with a group of sailors, he arrived at the front, where he fought as part of the 2nd Guards Army.

In mid-December 1942, the 98th division blocked the path of the advancing tank army of Field Marshal von Manstein. The regiment, in which Ilya Kaplunov served, held the defense near the Verkhnekumsky farm. On December 18, in the area of height 137.2, the guards repulsed four enemy attacks with heavy losses for him. In the afternoon, the Nazis, on a narrow sector of the front, brought into battle their last reserve - the 17th Panzer Division and the 65th Panzer Battalion.

All the soldiers of the company were killed in the battle, Kaplunov was left alone against five tanks. With two shots, he knocked out two enemy PzKpfw III tanks. Then he destroyed two other tanks that were trying to go around the position on the left. The fifth tank ran into the Kaplunov trench, when it drove on, the sailor threw a grenade at the engine compartment, destroying the tank. Soon four more tanks drove out from behind the ravine. Kaplunov knocked out three of them, however, he himself received two severe wounds: in the leg and in the arm. Seriously wounded and bleeding, Kaplunov also knocked out the ninth tank. According to other sources, Kaplunov knocked out five tanks with fire from anti-tank rifles and grenades, after which his left leg was torn off. Kaplunov, while bleeding, knocked out three more tanks, but his left arm was torn off. Kaplunov knocked out another ninth tank with grenades. Kaplunov was picked up by paramedics and the next day, December 20, 1942, he died in the hospital without regaining consciousness. A few days later, a bloody battle near the Aksai and Esaulovsky rivers ended in victory for the Soviet troops.

By decree of the Presidium of the Supreme Soviet of the USSR of October 26, 1943, for the destruction of 9 enemy tanks in the battle near the Verkhnekumsky farm and the valor and courage shown at the same time, Kaplunov Ilya Makarovich was posthumously awarded the title Hero of the Soviet Union. Kaplunov's body was buried in a mass grave near the Nizhnekumsky farm in the Oktyabrsky district of the Volgograd Oblast.

== Memory ==
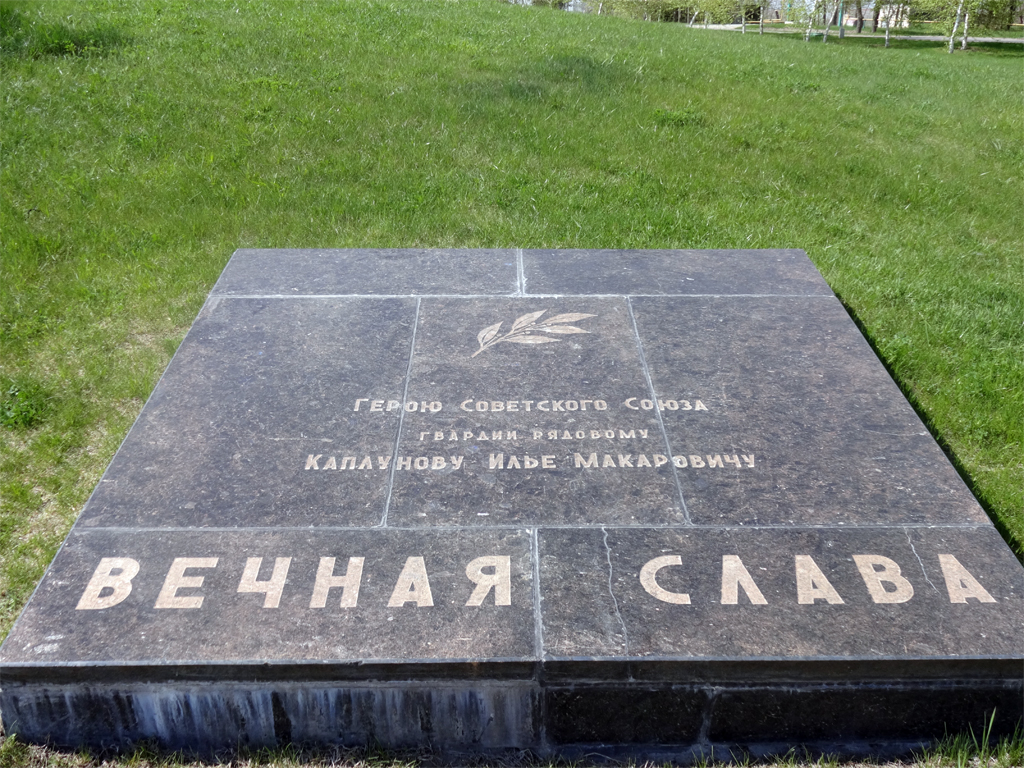
Memorial plate on the Mamayev Kurgan in Volgograd with inscription: "Eternal glory to the Hero of the Soviet Union, Guards Private Kaplunov Ilya Makarovich"

At the beginning of 1943, the Komsomol members of the Arkadak region raised money for the construction of the tank named «Ilya Kaplunov». The tank was handed over to Major V. M. Muravlev, a tanker from Saratov, who led him from the banks of the Volga to Berlin.

Streets in Vladivostok, the Romanovka-2 garrison (Primorsky Territory), Volgograd, Arkadak and in the village of Oktyabrsky are named after Ilya Kaplunov. His name is carved on the monument to the heroes of the Battle of Stalingrad in Volgograd.

By order of the troops of the Southern Front dated May 13, 1943, Ilya Kaplunov was forever enrolled in the lists of the 260th Guards Rifle Regiment of the 86th Guards Rifle Division. Until the end of the 1980s, the regiment was stationed in the city of Florești and was part of the 86th Guards Motorized Rifle Division of the 14th Guards Army of the Odessa Military District.

The bust was installed on the alley of Heroes in front of the headquarters of the 7060th air base of the naval aviation of the Pacific Fleet (military unit 69262) in the Yelizovo garrison of the Kamchatka Krai.

The bust was installed in the garrison Romanovka-2 (Pristan) Primorsky Krai

In 1961, a sculpture of Kaplunov with an anti-tank rifle in his hands was installed over the mass grave where Kaplunov was buried.

== Awards ==
- Hero of the Soviet Union (26 October 1943);
- Order of Lenin (26 October 1943)

== Books ==
- Герои Советского Союза: Краткий биографический словарь / Пред. ред. коллегии И. Н. Шкадов. — М.: Воениздат, 1987. — Т. 1 /Абаев — Любичев/. — 911 с. — 100 000 экз. — ISBN отс., Рег. No. в РКП 87-95382
- Зачислен навечно: биографический справочник / А. Д. Зайцев, И. И. Рощин, В. Н. Соловьёв. — Кн. 1: Абросимов-Ляпота. — М.: Политиздат, 1990. — 382 с. — 100 000 экз.
