= Konstantin Kovalyov (pilot) =

Soviet fighter pilot

- Константин Федотович Ковалёв
- Born: 20 May 1913; Mingrelskaya
- Died: 16 February 1995 (aged 81); Mingrelskaya
- Military career
- Allegiance: Soviet Union
- Branch: Soviet Air Force
- Rank: Captain
- Conflicts: World War II
- Awards: Hero of the Soviet Union

Konstantin Fedotovich Kovalyov (Russian: Константин Федотович Ковалёв; 20 May 1913 — 16 February 1995) was a Soviet fighter pilot during World War II. Awarded the title Hero of the Soviet Union on 22 January 1944 for his initial victories, his final tally is estimated to be around 22 solo and 14 shared shootdowns, although more conservative estimates put the figure at 19 solo and 12 shared.
