= Aleksandr Karpov =

Soviet aviator (1917–1944)

Aleksandr Terentevich Karpov
- Александр Терентьевич Карпов
- Born: 17 October [O.S. 4 October] 1917; Filenevo village, Kaluga Governorate, Russian Republic
- Died: 20 October 1944; Gulf of Finland
- Military career
- Allegiance: Soviet Union
- Branch: Soviet Air Force
- Service years: 1939 – 1944
- Rank: Major
- Unit: 27th Vyborg Guards Fighter Aviation Regiment
- Conflicts: World War II
- Awards: Hero of the Soviet Union (twice)

Aleksandr Terentyevich Karpov (Russian: Алекса́ндр Тере́нтьевич Ка́рпов; 17 October [O.S. 4 October] 1917 – 20 October 1944) was a squadron commander and flying ace in the 27th Vyborg Guards Fighter Aviation Regiment during the Second World War credited 27 individual and nine shared aerial victories, the most of any pilot in Soviet Air Defense Forces.

== Early life ==
Karpov was born on 17 October [O.S. 4 October] 1917 to a Russian family in the village of Filenevo, located at the modern-day Ferzikovsky District. After completing his seventh grade of school in 1933 he attended trade school for two years, going on to work as a toolmaker at the Kaluga Engineering Plant from 1935 until entering the military in 1939; previously, he graduated from the local aeroclub in 1938. Upon graduating from the Kachin Military Aviation School of Pilots he was assigned to the 161st Reserve Aviation Regiment, but in January 1941 he transferred to the 20th Fighter Aviation Regiment.

== World War II ==
Shortly after the German invasion of the Soviet Union, Karpov transferred as a flight commander to the 121st Fighter Aviation Regiment, a Moscow-based air defense unit, and flew his first combat sorties in late July. However, the post was short and he was soon reassigned to the 123rd Fighter Aviation Regiment in October; a little over a year later the regiment was awarded the guards designation and renamed as the 27th Guards Fighter Aviation Regiment. Earlier, he had been wounded during a sortie on 15 August 1941, but he quickly recovered and the regiment relocated to Leningrad later that month. Despite being tasked with defensive, not offensive, missions, Karpov became a flying ace in August 1942, having tallied five solo shootdowns in addition to several shared in addition to quickly rising through the ranks. After shooting down a Bf 109 on 30 June 1943 he was congratulated by various high Soviet officials including Aleksandr Yakovlev, since the shootdown was credited as the thousandth Nazi plane shot down over Leningrad. He frequently flew as wingman for Iriney Belyaev, another flying ace, until they were both shot down on 8 July 1943. While Karpov survived due to his parachute, Belyaev was killed in action. He was nominated for the title Hero of the Soviet Union For flying 370 sorties, engaging in 83 dogfights, and gaining 16 solo plus 7 shared shootdowns he was nominated for the title Hero of the Soviet Union on 7 August 1943, which was awarded on 28 September 1943. He was nominated for a second gold star on 25 June 1944 after increasing his tally to 26 solo victories over the course of 421 sorties, which included 94 dogfights. However, he did not live to receive the award; while escorting a group of Li-2 aircraft to an airbase in Tallinn at night in poor weather, his Yak-9 crashed in the Gulf of Finland. Despite the efforts of a search and rescue operation, Karpov and his plane were never recovered. Throughout the war he flew 456 sorties, engaged in 97 dogfights, tallying 27 solo and nine shared shootdowns, flying the Yak-1, Yak-7B, and Yak-9 fighters.

== Awards ==
- Twice Hero of the Soviet Union (28 September 1943 and 22 August 1944)
- Order of Lenin (28 September 1943)
- Three Order of the Red Banner (19 August 1942, 13 February 1943, and 7 April 1944)
- Order of Aleksandr Nevsky (13 April 1943)
