= Nikolai Karabulin =

Soviet Air Force officer (1918–1943)

- Born: 17 November 1918; Tarkhanka, Russian SFSR (now in Yaroslavl Oblast, Russia)
- Died: 5 July 1943 (aged 24)
- Military career
- Allegiance: Soviet Union
- Branch: Soviet Air Force
- Service years: 1938–1943
- Rank: Captain
- Conflicts: World War II; Battle of Moscow
- Awards: Hero of the Soviet Union

Nikolai Mikhailovich Karabulin (Russian: Николай Михайлович Карабулин; 1918–1943) was a Soviet World War II Il-2 pilot and commanding officer of a ground-attack group whose pilots destroyed twenty enemy aircraft in a raid on a German airbase during the Battle of Moscow on 16 September 1941.

Lieutenant Karabulin was badly injured when his cockpit was hit by enemy anti-aircraft fire, but successfully landed his Il-2 on friendly territory. He was awarded the honorary title of Hero of the Soviet Union on 12 April 1942.

== Biography ==
Nikolai Karabulin was born in the village of Tarkhanovka in 1918 and worked as a factory electrician at the Proletarskaya Svoboda plant in Yaroslavl before joining the armed forces in 1938. He was trained to fly at the Stalingrad Military Pilots' Aviation School and had completed thirteen missions before the raid on 16 September 1941.

A lieutenant at the time of the raid, Karabulin was the commanding officer of a small attack group of planes that hit a German airbase at Smolensk and destroyed twenty enemy bomber aircraft. His own Ilyushin Il-2 plane came under enemy anti-aircraft fire that penetrated the cockpit and resulted in twenty wounds to his back, left hand, and face, but he continued to successfully fly the Il-2 back to friendly territory. Lieutenant Karabulin was awarded the honorary title of Hero of the Soviet Union by the Presidium of the Supreme Soviet of the USSR in recognition of his service on 12 April 1942.

Karabulin returned to flying and was ultimately promoted to captain and squadron commanding officer. He died while carrying out a mission on 5 July 1943 and was interred in an unmarked grave in Maloarkhangelsk, Oryol Oblast.

A memorial plaque in Yaroslavl and an exhibit at the Proletarskaya Svoboda factory where Captain Karabulin had worked were subsequently installed in his honor.

== Awards ==
- Gold Star of the Hero of the Soviet Union
- Order of Lenin
- Order of Alexander Nevsky
- Order of the Patriotic War, 2nd class
