= Ilya Kaverin =

Soviet army senior sergeant (1910–1963)

Ilya Ananevich Kaverin
- Илья Ананьевич Каверин
- Born: 15 May 1910; Astara, Lankaran Uyezd, Baku Governorate, Russian Empire
- Died: 19 November 1963 (age 63); Astara
- Military career
- Allegiance: Soviet Union
- Branch: Red Army
- Service years: 1941–1945
- Rank: Senior sergeant
- Unit: 9th Mechanized Corps
- Conflicts: World War II; Battle of the Caucasus; Battle of Kiev
- Awards: Hero of the Soviet Union

Ilya Ananevich Kaverin (Russian: Илья Ананьевич Каверин; 15 May 1910 – 19 November 1963) was a Red Army senior sergeant and Hero of the Soviet Union. Kaverin was awarded the title for reportedly resisting German troops from his burned-out tank during the Battle of Kiev in 1943. He reportedly killed 30 German soldiers. After the war Kaverin was demobilized and returned to his native Astara.

== Early life ==
Kaverin was born on 15 May 1910 in Astara to a fisherman's family. He received primary education and worked as a fisherman.

== World War II ==
In 1941, Kaverin was drafted into the Red Army. He fought in the Battle of the Caucasus. In November 1943, he fought in the Battle of Kiev. Kaverin was a tank driver in the 74th Tank Regiment of the 71st Mechanized Brigade in the 9th Mechanized Corps. His tank reportedly broke through German lines but suffered a hit on its turret, killing the commander, gunner and signaller. Kaverin was reportedly the only survivor in the burning tank. He reportedly extinguished the flames and with a machine gun and grenades repulsed ten German attacks over the next days. Kaverin reportedly killed 30 German soldiers and after running out of ammunition returned to Soviet lines under cover of darkness. During the later battle for the village of Khotiv, Kaverin's tank reportedly destroyed a German infantry platoon and 12 vehicles. For his actions he was awarded the title Hero of the Soviet Union and the Order of Lenin on 10 January 1944.

In 1944, he joined the Communist Party of the Soviet Union. On 14 May 1945 Kaverin was awarded the Order of the Red Star for his actions in the Battle of Berlin.

== Postwar ==
Kaverin was discharged with the end of the war with the rank of senior sergeant. He returned to Astara and worked on the Kitabinskom state farm. He died on 19 November 1963 and was buried in Astara.
