= Nikolai Kabalin =

Nikolai Petrovich Kabalin
- Николай Петрович Кабалин
- Born: 24 February 1920; Novo-Alexandrovka, Insarsky Uyezd, Penza Governorate, Russian Empire
- Died: 23 February 1991 (aged 70); Nizhny Novgorod, Soviet Union
- Military career
- Allegiance: Soviet Union
- Branch: Red Army
- Service years: 1941–1944
- Rank: Starshina
- Units: 21st Guards Mechanized Brigade, 8th Guards Mechanized Corps
- Conflicts: World War II; Zhitomir-Berdichev Offensive; Dnieper-Carpathian Offensive
- Awards: Hero of the Soviet Union

Nikolai Petrovich Kabalin (Russian: Николай Петрович Кабалин; 24 February 1920 – 23 February 1991) was a Red Army starshina or sergeant major and Hero of the Soviet Union. Kabalin was awarded the title for his actions during the Dnieper–Carpathian Offensive. Kabalin reportedly destroyed a German machine gun, enabling his battalion to establish a bridgehead. In early May 1944 he was seriously wounded when a bomb hit his dugout and was later discharged for medical reasons. Postwar, he worked at the Gorky automobile plant.

== Early life ==
Kabalin was born on 24 February 1920 in the village of Novo-Alexandrovka in Penza Governorate to a peasant family. His family moved with him to Gorky (Nizhny Novgorod) in 1930. After graduating from tenth grade, he worked as a quality controller and calibrator at the Gorky Automobile Plant. In May 1941, Kabalin was drafted into the Red Army.

== World War II ==
Kabalin was sent to the 1st Airborne Corps. He spent 1942 in training in the Teykovo area. On 8 December, the corps became the 1st Guards Airborne Division and Kabalin became a squad leader in the new unit. In February 1943, he fought in the Battle of Demyansk. On 13 March, Kabalin and 12 other paratroopers were dropped behind German lines with the task of blowing up a bridge over the Lovat River. The men reached the bridge after moving 10 kilometers in two days. The men began the attack at night after Kabalin reportedly killed the German sentry and then along with seven others engaged in a diversionary raid on the barracks, while the remaining four laid explosives under the bridge. The four soldiers at the bridge were involved in a firefight but were able to blow it up. Of Kabalin's group, only three survived and Kabalin was wounded. The 1st Guards Airborne Division soon began its offensive to the Lovat and Redya Rivers and Kabalin and his group were able to link up with the division. He was immediately sent to a field hospital and awarded the Order of the Red Star on 10 April.

Kabalin left the hospital in May and until July fought in the defense of the Redya near Onufriyevo and Zhukovo. In August the division fought in the fighting for Staraya Russa. During 18–19 August, Kabalin's squad fought in the breakthrough of German defenses 4 kilometers south of Staraya Russa, the cutting the Staraya Russa-Kholm highway and the advance to the Porus River. Kabalin was promoted to Senior sergeant around this time. On 29 August the division began transfer to Kharkov, arriving on 7 September at the Dergachi railway station. On 13 September Kabalin and his squad ran into a group of German soldiers numbering up to 20 in the woods south of Dergachi. He was wounded in the ensuing firefight and the group of German soldiers was killed by arriving units of the 1st Tank Army. After recovering from his wounds, Kabalin stayed with the tankists and became a squad leader in motor rifle battalion of the 8th Guards Mechanized Corps's 21st Guards Mechanized Brigade.

The 1st Tank Army did not fight in the Battle of the Dnieper, and Kabalin and his unit crossed the Dnieper without fighting. At the start of the Zhitomir–Berdichev Offensive, his battalion broke through German defenses south of Brusilov on 24 December. The battalion advanced to the village of Popelnya and the Kazatin station. On 29 December Kabalin was slightly wounded in the thigh during the battle for the station but was not sent to the hospital. From 6 March, he fought in the Proskurov-Chernivtsi Offensive. On 24 March, the brigade reached the village of Ustechko near the Dniester, where they met heavy German fire. While the tanks of the 1st Guards Tank Brigade engaged German motorized infantry, the Soviet motorized infantry began to cross the Dniester. Kabalin was reportedly one of the first to reach the other bank of the river. When there were four Soviet soldiers on the other bank, Kabalin reportedly attacked and killed the crew of a German machine gun. Grenades and machine gun fire of the other troops killed German soldiers in the trenches. This resulted in the capture of a 300-meter bridgehead on the other bank. For his actions, Kabalin received the title Hero of the Soviet Union and the Order of Lenin on 26 April.

In mid-April, Kabalin and a group of airborne veterans in the 1st Tank Army conducted an operation to blow up a German ammunition warehouse in the Bilyi Cheremosh valley. For this operation, Kabalin was awarded a second Order of the Red Star on 20 April. In early May, he was seriously wounded and shell-shocked after a bomb hit a dugout. He spent months in the hospital and in December 1944 was discharged. Kabalin returned to Gorky.

== Postwar ==
Between 1945 and 1950, Kabalin was director of the Avtozavodskaya printing house. In 1950 he became foreman of the equipment workshop and in 1968 retired. On 6 April 1985 he was awarded the Order of the Patriotic War 1st class on the 40th anniversary of the end of World War II. Kabalin died on 23 February 1991 and was buried in the city's Staro-Avtozavodskoye Cemetery.
