= Georgy Kharaborkin =

- Георгий Филимонович Хараборкин
- Born: 23 November 1905; Aleshenka, Trubchevsky Uyezd, Oryol Governorate, Russian Empire
- Died: 6 July 1941 (aged 35) east of Beshankovichy, Vitebsk Oblast, Belorussian SSR, Soviet Union
- Military career
- Allegiance: Soviet Union
- Branch: Red Army
- Service years: 1927–1941
- Rank: Captain
- Unit: 20th Tank Brigade
- Conflicts: World War II; Winter War; Eastern Front †
- Awards: Hero of the Soviet Union

Georgy Filimonovich Kharaborkin (Russian: Георгий Филимонович Хараборкин; 23 November 1905 – 6 July 1941) was a Red Army captain and a Hero of the Soviet Union. Kharaborkin was awarded the title for his leadership of a tank company in the Winter War, during which his company broke through the Mannerheim Line. He became a battalion commander in the 7th Mechanized Corps' 14th Tank Division after the end of the war. After the German invasion of the Soviet Union in June 1941, Kharaborkin's unit was sent into combat, in an action known as the Lepel counterattack. Before the counterattack began, his corps commander sent Kharaborkin and a dozen heavy tanks on a reconnaissance in force to find fords across a river. The detachment was destroyed on the morning of 6 July when it ran into a German minefield covered by anti-tank guns and artillery, and Kharaborkin was killed.

== Early life ==
Kharaborkin was born on 23 November 1905 in the village of Aleshenka in Oryol Governorate (now in Trubchevsky District, Bryansk Oblast) to a peasant family. He received lower secondary education and worked as a coal miner in the Donbas. Kharaborkin was drafted into the Red Army in 1927. He became a Communist Party of the Soviet Union member in 1929. In 1933, he graduated from the Oryol Tank School.

== Winter War ==
Kharaborkin fought in the Winter War, during which he commanded a tank company of the T-28-equipped 91st Tank Battalion of the 7th Army's 20th Tank Brigade. Kharaborkin fought in the Soviet breakthrough of the Mannerheim Line in February 1940. On 11 February, his company, attached to the 245th Rifle Regiment of the 123rd Rifle Division, led the attack on Hill 65.5 and the bunker "Poppius" near Lähde. During the attack, they suppressed several emplacements and blocked Finnish bunkers. The hill was captured by the evening of 11 February. The company had lost four T-28s in the attack. On 13 February, Kharaborkin's company captured four guns from the Finnish and used them to fire on a fortified area. Kharaborkin was wounded, but remained in the battle. For his leadership, Kharaborkin was awarded the title Hero of the Soviet Union and the Order of Lenin on 11 April.

== World War II ==
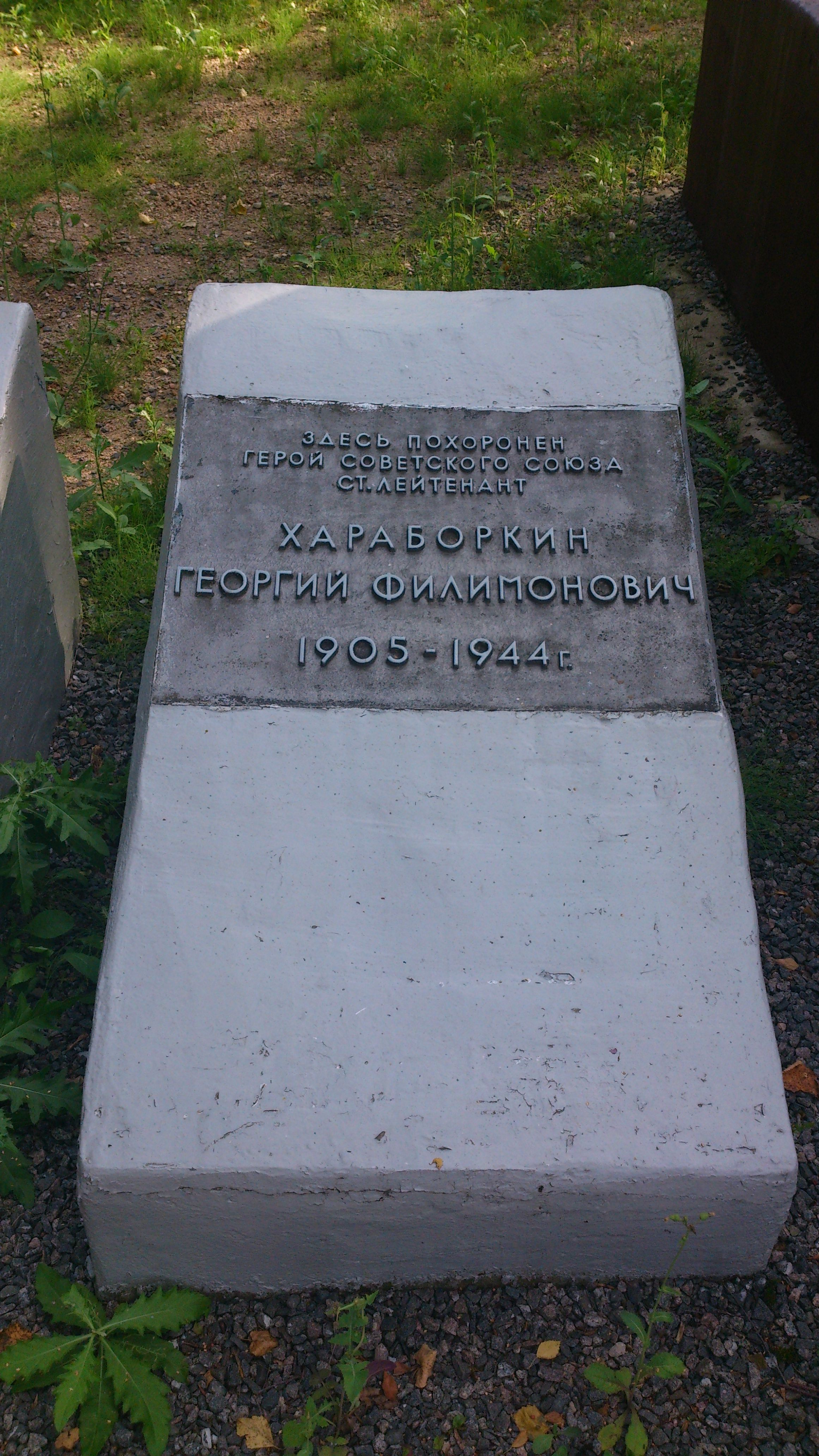
Kharaborkin's gravestone in Beshankovichy

Kharaborkin became commander of the 1st Tank Battalion in the 27th Tank Regiment of the 14th Tank Division, part of the 7th Mechanized Corps. After the German invasion of the Soviet Union, the corps was ordered to counterattack German troops in what became known as the Lepel counterattack. On the morning of 6 July, before the counterattack began, Kharaborkin led a reinforced company-sized detachment of twelve KV-1 heavy tanks and two BT-7 light tanks to conduct a reconnaissance in force of crossing sites over the Chernogostitsa east of Beshankovichy, on the orders of corps commander Vasily Vinogradov. The reconnaissance in force was supported by artillery fire from the 14th Howitzer Artillery Regiment, sappers from the 27th Tank Regiment, and the 2nd Battalion of 14th Motor Rifle Regiment. However, German troops from the 20th Infantry Division (Motorized) had already occupied the ford and emplaced anti-tank mines there. When Kharaborkin's tanks attempted to cross the ford, four KVs struck mines and three were bogged down in the marshy ground. German PaK anti-tank guns and artillery fire opened up on the Soviet tanks, and Kharaborkin was killed. Seven tanks were abandoned in the river, and two with damaged suspensions were recovered under fire. Kharaborkin was buried in Beshankovichy. On 9 August, he was posthumously awarded the Order of the Red Banner.

== Bibliography ==
=== References ===
- Campbell, David (2016). Finnish Soldier vs Soviet Soldier: Winter War 1939–40. Oxford: Osprey. ISBN 9781472813251.
- Chew, Allen F. (1971). The White Death: The Epic of the Soviet-Finnish Winter War. East Lansing: Michigan State University Press. ISBN 9780870131677.
- Forczyk, Robert (2014). Tank Warfare on the Eastern Front 1941–1942: Schwerpunkt. Barnsley, South Yorkshire: Pen & Sword. ISBN 9781781590089.
