= Psyzh =

Rural locality in Abazinsky District, Karachay-Cherkess Republic, Russia

Coordinates: 44°14′N 42°01′E

Psyzh (Russian: Псыж; Abaza: Псыжв) is a rural locality (an aul) in Abazinsky District of the Karachay-Cherkess Republic, Russia. Population: 8,182 (2010 census); 6,810 (2002 census).

== Demographics ==
In 2002, the population mainly comprised the following ethnic groups:

- Abazins: 79.2%
- Cherkess: 8.6%
- Russians: 7.3%
- Karachays: 1.5%
- Nogais: 0.6%
- Others: 2.8%
