= Yevgeny Kungurtsev =

Yevgeny Maksimovich Kungurtsev
- Евгений Максимович Кунгурцев
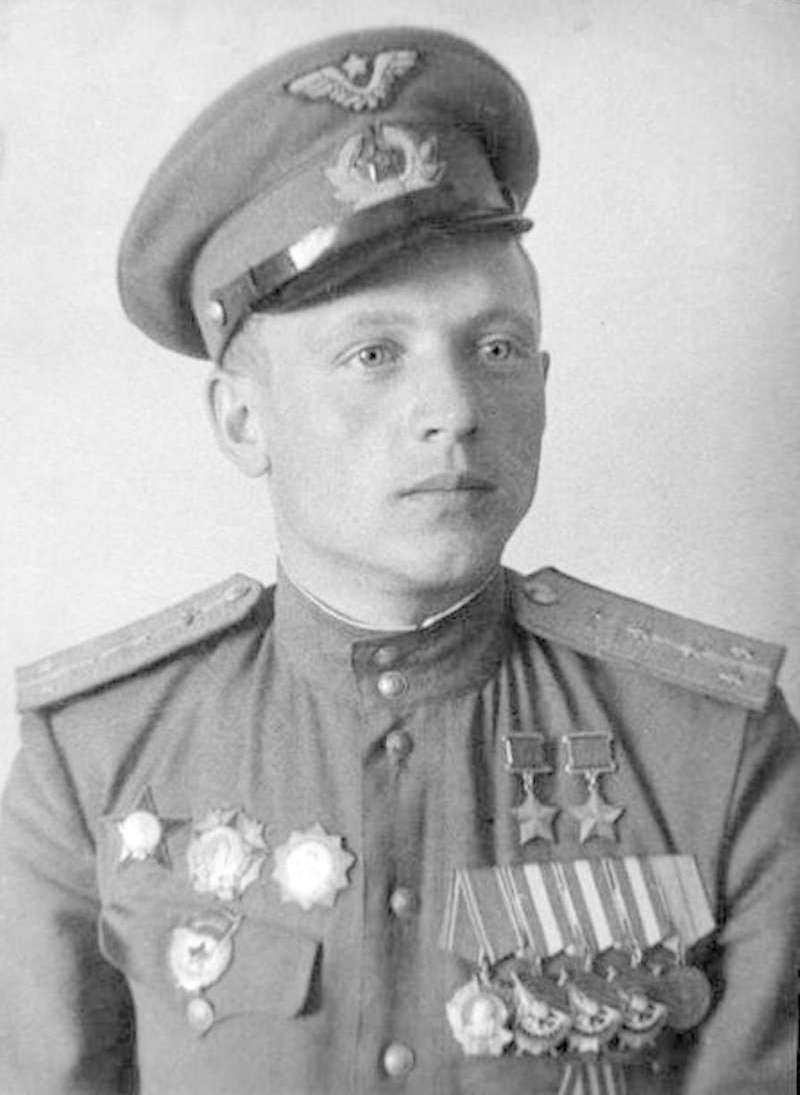
- Born: 3 October 1921; Izhevsk, Udmurt Autonomous Oblast, RSFSR
- Died: 11 May 2000 (aged 78); Berdiansk, Zaporizhzhia Oblast, Ukraine
- Military career
- Allegiance: Soviet Union
- Branch: Soviet Air Force
- Service years: 1940 – 1968
- Rank: General-major of aviation
- Unit: 15th Guards Ground Attack Aviation Regiment
- Conflicts: World War II
- Awards: Hero of the Soviet Union (twice)

Yevgeny Maksimovich Kungurtsev (Russian: Евге́ний Макси́мович Кунгу́рцев; 3 October 1921 – 11 May 2000) was a squadron commander in the 15th Guards Ground Attack Aviation Regiment during the Second World War who was twice awarded the title Hero of the Soviet Union. He went on to become a Major-General of Aviation in 1964.

== Early life ==
Kungurtsev was born on 3 October 1921 to a working class Russian family in Izhevsk. After completing his seventh grade of school in 1939 he went on to study for one year at the Votkinsk Engineering College in addition to the local aeroclub, having wanted to become a pilot since he was a child. Having entered the Red Army in August 1940, he graduated from the Balashov Military Aviation School of Pilots in December 1942 before being assigned to the 15th Separate Training Aviation Regiment, where he remained until January.

== World War II ==
Upon arriving at the warfront in Leningrad as a pilot in 15th Guards Assault Aviation Regiment, he began flying combat sorties on the Il-2 as part of the efforts to break the blockade of Leningrad. On 22 July 1943 he participated in a sortie that resulted in the total destruction of a train station with just two passes at it. Despite being slightly wounded by a shell fragment during a sortie over Pskov on 14 February 1944, he continued to tally up sorties, and less than a month later he flew in a sortie over Estonia with several other aircraft that resulted in the destruction of an ammunition depot and a platoon of enemy combatants. In addition to hitting a variety of ground based targets, he also took out multiple enemy aircraft in flight; when being pursued by a group of FW 190 fighters on 1 April 1944 after a mission he carefully dodged their attacked and managed to shoot down one of them before returning safely to his home airfield, and on 2 July 1944, he shared in the shootdown of another FW 190. When not flying ground-attack missions, he flew reconnaissance missions to provide information about enemy positions to Soviet military command; On 14 July 1944 he successfully photographed strategically important parts of the Mannerheim Line, and on 20 August 1944 he photographed the Johvi station area in Estonia, meticulously documenting the area in photo, for which he was thanked by General Stepan Rybalchenko, commander of the 13th Air Army. After being shot down on 4 March 1945 and making an emergency landing before hitting his head and losing consciousness, he was taken prisoner by the Axis and held in a prisoner infirmary for nine days. While being taken to another camp, the convoy transporting the group of Soviet prisoners was attacked, resulting in chaos that allowed Kungurtsev to escape from his guards. After hiding in the woods for a week he returned to his regiment on 26 March 1945. In total he flew 210 combat sorties, shooting down one FW 190 in addition six shared shootdowns; on the ground, he took out five ammunition depots, 700 enemy soldiers, two trains, ten tanks, 24 mortars, 26 artillery points, two locomotives, and 46 rail cars.

== Postwar ==
After Germany surrendered, Kungurtsev remained as a squadron commander in his regiment until he was promoted to assistant commander of the air rifle service of the regiment in June. Later he became a check pilot for the 277th Assault Aviation Division, but left in August 1948 for the Air Force Academy, which he graduated from in 1952. He then served as commander of the 749th Assault Aviation Regiment until 1955, and in 1957 he graduated from the Military Academy of General Staff. After becoming deputy commander of flight training for the 164th Guards Bomber Aviation Regiment in November 1957, and in October 1959 he was made deputy commander of the regiment. In April 1960 he transferred to the 158th Bomber Aviation Division, where he remained until August 1961; in April 1964 he was promoted to the rank major-general of aviation. Starting in June 1964 he commanded 6th Guards Bomber Aviation Division, which was renamed several times but Kungurtsev remained in command of for the remainder of his military career. The unit was turned into the 11th Guards Military Transport Aviation Division in the summer of that year, and again renamed to the 18th Guards Military Transport Aviation Division in 1966. He retired from the military in September 1968, having flown the Il-2, Il-10, Il-28, and An-12 during his career. As a civilian he worked as the deputy chairman of the Priazovsky Territorial Council Resort Management Council. He died in the city of Berdyansk, Ukraine on 11 May 2000.

== Awards and honors ==
- Twice Hero of the Soviet Union (23 February 1945 and 19 April 1945)
- Order of Lenin (23 February 1945)
- Four Orders of the Red Banner (12 October 1943, 17 June 1944, 2 August 1944, and 22 February 1968)
- Order of Bogdan Khmelnitsky 3rd class (24 March 1945)
- Order of Alexander Nevsky (2 November 1944)
- Order of the Patriotic War 1st class (11 March 1985)
- Two Orders of the Red Star (26 July 1943 and 30 December 1956)
- Order of the Red Banner of Labour (4 June 1981)
- campaign and jubilee medals
