= Konstantin Krasavin =

Konstantin Alekseyevich Krasavin
- Born: 20 May 1917; Tsaritsyno-Dachnoye, Moscow Governorate, Russian Republic
- Died: 18 January 1988 (aged 70); Kalinin, Soviet Union
- Burial place: Tver, Russian Federation
- Military career
- Allegiance: Soviet Union
- Branch: Soviet Air Forces
- Service years: 1938–1955
- Rank: Lieutenant Colonel
- Units: 72nd Guards Fighter Regiment; 6th Air Army
- Conflicts: World War II; Battle of Moscow; Demyansk Pocket; Battle of Kursk; Operation Bagration; Baltic Offensive; Budapest Offensive; Prague Offensive
- Awards: Hero of the Soviet Union

Lieutenant Colonel Konstantin Alekseyevich Krasavin (Russian: Константин Алексеевич Красавин) (20 May 1917 – 18 January 1988) was a Russian flying ace and fighter pilot of the Great Patriotic War, during which he flew for the Soviet air forces. He is credited with 376 sorties, 106 dogfights and 21 kills between 1941 and 1945 on the Eastern Front, piloting the Yakovlev Yak-3, the Lavochkin La-5, the Yakovlev Yak-7 and the Hawker Hurricane during which time he held the rank of Major. He was awarded the title of Hero of the Soviet Union along with the Order of Lenin for military valour in 1946 by the Presidium of the Supreme Soviet, retiring from military service in 1955. His citation for his Gold Star medal read that "wherever Comrade Krasavin is with his group of fighters, there is victory over the enemy".

== Early life and enlistment ==
Krasavin was born in what is now the suburbs of Moscow, in the settlement of Tsaritsyno-Dachnoe in the then-Russian Republic. Born into a working-class family, he graduated from a trade school in 1936 and worked as a dough mixer in a bakery in Tbilisi. He was conscripted in 1938 and was commissioned as a military officer upon his graduation from the Military Aviation School in Stalingrad in 1940.

== Great Patriotic War ==
On 22 June 1941 Germany launched Operation Barbarossa, sending three Army Groups to invade the Soviet Union. The invading armies formed a front stretching from the Baltic Sea to the Black Sea, a distance of over a thousand miles. In December, Krasavin was assigned to the 6th Air Army which was transferred between various fronts and units of the Soviet Air Forces throughout the conflict – including the 1st Baltic Front, 3rd Belorussian Front, and the 2nd Ukrainian Front. Initially piloting the lend-lease Hawker Hurricane, he later became established on the Lavochkin La-5f and La-7. Involved in the Battle of Moscow as well as the bloody fighting at the Demyansk Pocket, by 1943 he had been credited with over 300 sorties.

In that year, he was brought before a military tribunal charged with a serious disciplinary offence that took place at a dance in Tula during replenishment of the 1st Baltic Front. However, upon influence from his commanding officer he was pardoned due to his high number of combat missions, which had resulted in 18 kills; he would gain a further 3 by the end of the war in engagements throughout the Soviet advances into Eastern Europe during and following Operation Bagration. It was recorded that by early 1945, he had participated in 106 air combats, with 21 kills; ten Fw 190 fighters in addition to seven Messerschmitt Bf 109s, two Junkers Ju 88 bombers and two further Heinkel He 111s.

He was awarded the title of Hero of the Soviet Union after the war by the Presidium of the Supreme Soviet on 15 May 1946 for "excellent command", "rich military experience" and cited specifically his "burning hatred for the enemy", including reference to a battle at Makarovo in 1942 during which his aircraft sustained more than 100 holes from enemy fire but nevertheless managed to down one Ju 88 without sustaining any personal injury.

During the war he also accumulated three Order of the Red Banner medals, and an Order of the Patriotic War issued in 1943, followed by another issue in 1985.

== Post-war life ==
He continued service in the Soviet Air Forces until 1955, by which time he had qualified to fly jet fighters. He retired in that year due to illness and moved to Kalinin, now Tver, where he lived until his death in 1988.
