= Dmitry Kamolikov =

Red Army sergeant

Dmitry Timofeyevich Kamolikov
- Дмитрий Тимофеевич Камоликов
- Kamolikov, c. 1940s
- Born: 1923; Boguslavka village, Zmeinogorsky Uyezd, Tomsk Governorate, Soviet Union
- Died: 16 April 1977 (aged 53–54); Bila Tserkva, Kiev Oblast, Ukrainian SSR, Soviet Union
- Military career
- Allegiance: Soviet Union
- Branch: Red Army
- Service years: 1942–1945
- Rank: Sergeant
- Unit: 1st Guards Airborne Division
- Conflicts: World War II; Second Jassy–Kishinev Offensive; Battle of Debrecen; Budapest Offensive
- Awards: Hero of the Soviet Union

Dmitry Timofeyevich Kamolikov (Russian: Дмитрий Тимофеевич Камоликов; 1923 – 16 April 1977) was a Red Army sergeant and a Hero of the Soviet Union. Kamolikov was awarded the title for his actions in the Budapest Offensive during the crossing of the Tisza, when he reportedly led the repulsion of 12 counterattacks. He was seriously wounded in the battle and was discharged. Postwar he worked as an engineer at a factory equipment supply factory.

== Early life ==
Kamolikov was born in 1923 in the village of Boguslavka in Tomsk Governorate to a peasant family. His family moved to the village of Kirov in Loktevsky District. He graduated from seventh grade in Semipalatinsk in 1938 and trade school in Kazan in 1940. He worked as a turner in a factory.

== World War II ==
Kamolikov was drafted into the Red Army in February 1942. He was sent to the front in March with the 151st Rifle Regiment of the 8th Rifle Division. He was wounded in July. In October, he was wounded again. On 17 October, he was awarded the Medal "For Courage". Kamolikov was seriously wounded in February 1943 and spent over a year in the hospital. In 1944, he joined the Communist Party of the Soviet Union.

In August 1944, he returned to the front as a squad leader in the 3rd Guards Airborne Regiment of the 1st Guards Airborne Division. He fought in the Second Jassy–Kishinev Offensive. In late August and September, he fought in the Bucharest-Arad Offensive. In October, Kamolikov fought in the Battle of Debrecen. In November, he fought in the Budapest Offensive. On 5 November, leading his squad, Kamolikov crossed the Tisza near Tiszasellesh, south of Tiszafüred, in the first wave. While crossing his boat was reportedly sunk by a shell and Kamolikov swam to the other bank. Attacking a Hungarian trench, he reportedly destroyed a machine gun with a grenade. During the day he reportedly helped repulse twelve Hungarian counterattacks. He fought in melee combat three times. Reportedly repulsing a counterattack with a machine gun, Kamolikov forced a Hungarian platoon to retreat. When the bridgehead had been expanded the Hungarian line was breached, Kamolikov's squad reportedly advanced seven kilometers and crossed the Little Tisza, seizing a bridgehead. Kamolikov again swam across the river and helped take a bridgehead in the village of Sarud, where 70 enemy soldiers were captured. In a battle on the bridgehead Kamolikov was severely wounded.

On 24 March 1945, Kamolikov was awarded the title Hero of the Soviet Union and the Order of Lenin.

== Postwar ==
In 1945, Kamolikov was discharged because of his wounds. He moved to Novosibirsk and graduated from a civil engineering school there. He worked as a foreman and engineer at the Tyazhstankohydropress Factory. In 1967, he moved to Bila Tserkva and worked at an electric condenser factory. Kamolikov died on 16 April 1977.
