= Pavel Kamozin =

Soviet air force captain

Pavel Mikhailovich Kamozin
- Павел Михайлович Камозин
- Born: 16 July [O.S. 3 July] 1917; Bezhitsa, Oryol Governorate, Russian Republic
- Died: 24 November 1983 (aged 66); Bryansk, Soviet Union
- Military career
- Allegiance: Soviet Union
- Branch: Soviet Air Force
- Service years: 1937-1946
- Rank: Captain
- Units: 269th Fighter Aviation Regiment, 66th Fighter Aviation Regiment
- Conflicts: World War II; Battle of the Caucasus; Crimean Offensive; East Prussian Offensive
- Awards: Hero of the Soviet Union (twice)

Pavel Mikhailovich Kamozin (Russian: Павел Михайлович Камозин; 16 July [O.S. 3 July] 1917 – 24 November 1983) was a Soviet Air Force Captain and double Hero of the Soviet Union. Kamozin became a pilot in the Soviet Air Force before World War II and was flying Polikarpov I-16s in June 1941. After being wounded in the foot on the second day of the war he was sent to become an instructor but returned to the front in the fall of 1942. By the end of April 1943, Kamozin had reportedly shot down 12 enemy aircraft. For this action he was awarded his first Hero of the Soviet Union award. By 1 July 1944, when he was awarded his second Hero of the Soviet Union award, Kamozin had reportedly shot down 29 enemy aircraft. In January 1945 his Bell P-39 Airacobra crashed due to an engine failure and Kamozin was severely wounded. He reportedly claimed 35 victories during the war. Postwar, he worked in civil aviation in Bryansk.

== Early life ==
Kamozin was born on 16 July [O.S. 3 July] 1917 in Bezhitsa in Oryol Governorate to a working-class Russian family. In 1931 he graduated from sixth grade and entered a trade school. He worked as a mechanic at the Red Profintern factory. In 1934 Kamozin began to study at the flying club. He was drafted into the Red Army in 1937. He was sent to the Borisoglebsk Pilots Military Aviation School, from which he graduated in 1938.

== World War II ==
When Germany invaded the Soviet Union, Kamozin was a Polikarpov I-16 pilot in the Kiev Special Military District with the 43rd Fighter Aviation Regiment. On 23 June he flew his first sortie, but was wounded in the foot. Kamozin was sent to be retrained on the Lavochkin-Gorbunov-Gudkov LaGG-3 to become an instructor. He returned to combat a year later. Kamozin became a flight leader in the 246th Fighter Aviation Regiment of the 236th Fighter Aviation Division, fighting in the Battle of the Caucasus. On Kamozin's first sortie on 19 July, over Shaumyan in the Tuapse area, he shot down three Bf 109s. In his first month of combat, he reportedly claimed four enemy aircraft, including a Do 217. On 7 October Kamozin shot down three Bf 109s that were escorting Junkers Ju 87s. In November 1942, Kamozin reportedly destroyed two Bf 109s and a Bf 110 during one engagement. In December he transferred to become a squadron deputy commander in the 269th Fighter Aviation Regiment. On 19 December, he was awarded the Order of the Patriotic War 1st class. He was awarded his first Order of the Red Banner on 23 March 1943. Kamozin had reportedly made 82 sorties and shot down 12 aircraft in 23 air battles. On 1 May 1943 he was awarded the title Hero of the Soviet Union and the Order of Lenin.

Kamozin was then sent to a reserve regiment for P-39 training. He was assigned to the P-39-equipped 66th Fighter Aviation Regiment of the 329th Fighter Aviation Division in Crimea during October, where he soon became a squadron commander with the rank of captain. In his first combat action with the squadron, Kamozin shot down an Fw 189 but his P-39 was heavily damaged by anti-aircraft fire and he was forced to land in the area between the opposing lines. On 21 November, Kamozin was awarded the Order of the Red Banner a second time. In the battles for Sevastopol, the squadron reportedly claimed 64 aircraft, 19 of which were shot down by Kamozin. On 31 December he and his wingman, Vladimir Ladykin, reportedly found a German transport plane escorted by six Bf 109s while returning from a reconnaissance mission. Kamozin shot down the transport, which was upon the fall of Crimea reportedly found to have been carrying 18 German generals. On 31 January, he was awarded the Order of Alexander Nevsky. After the fall of Crimea, the 66th was transferred to Myrhorod and Pyriatyn airfields, where it conducted air defense for the American shuttle bombing campaign (Operation Frantic) between May and November 1944. By the midsummer of 1944, Kamozin had reportedly made 131 successful sorties and fought in 56 air battles in which he claimed 29 victories and 13 shared. On 1 July 1944 he was awarded the title Hero of the Soviet Union a second time. On 29 December he transferred to the 101st Guards Fighter Aviation Regiment. From 13 January, he flew sorties in the East Prussian Offensive. On 20 January 1945 he flew another sortie, but due to an engine problem the P-39 stalled and crashed. He never recovered from injuries sustained in the accident and Kamozin spent Victory Day in the hospital. Most 21st century estimates of his final tally credit him with 34 solo and 4 shared victories.

== Postwar ==
In 1946, Kamozin was discharged. He returned to Bryansk and worked in civil aviation. He also conducted social work. Kamozin was made an honorary citizen of the city in 1966 and died on 24 November 1983. He was buried in a city cemetery.

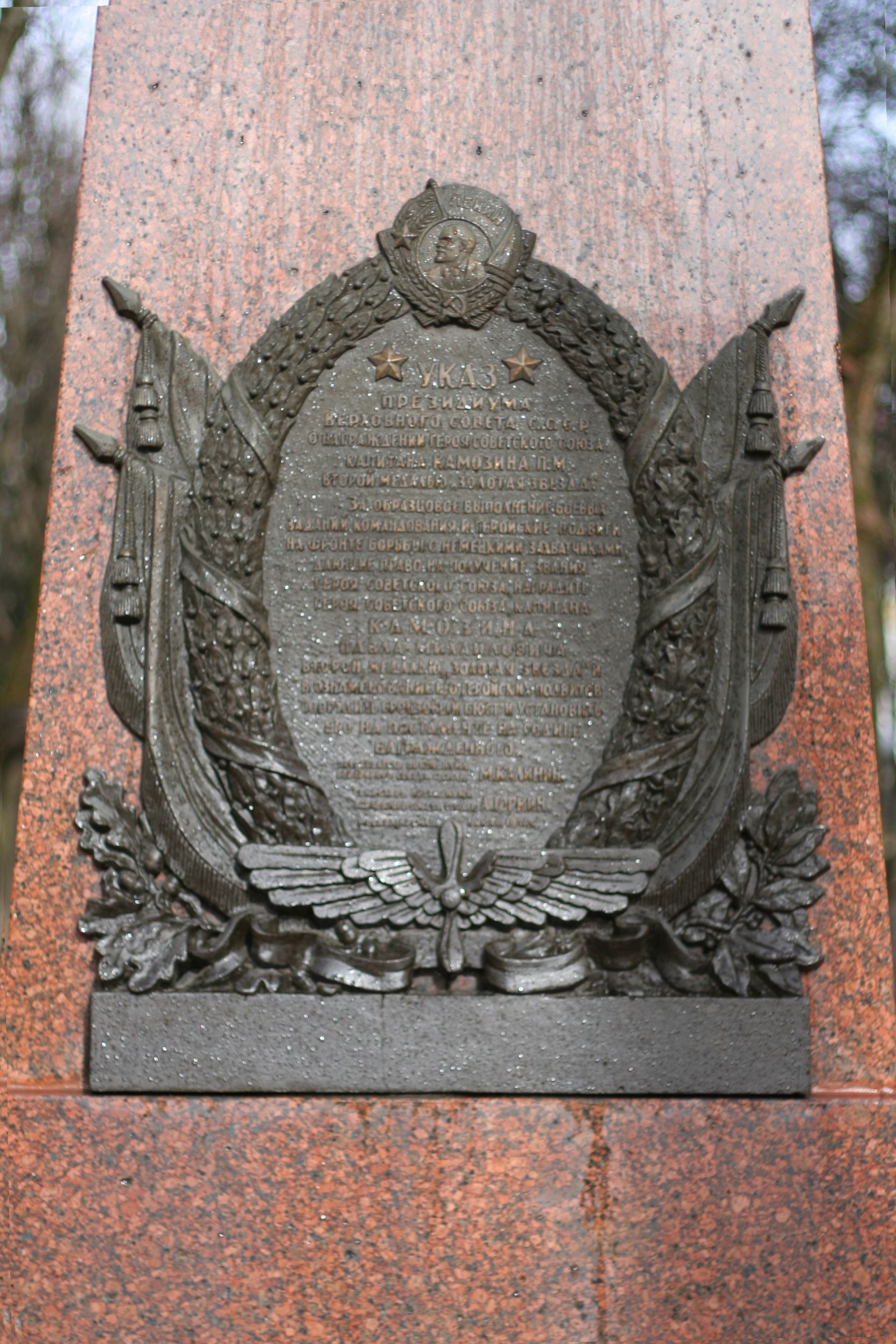
Memorial to Kamozin in Bryansk

== Awards ==
- Twice Hero of the Soviet Union (1 May 1943 and 1 July 1944)
- Order of Lenin (1 May 1943)
- Two Order of the Red Banner (23 March 1943 and 21 November 1943)
- Order of Alexander Nevsky (31 January 1944)
- Order of the Patriotic War 1st class (19 December 1942)

== Legacy ==
A street in Bryansk is named for Kamozin. A bronze bust was also erected in the park near the Bryansk Engineering Palace of Culture. There is also a museum devoted to Kamozin in Secondary School No. 11.
