= Churguy-ool Khomushku =

Soviet army officer

Churguy-ool Namgaevich Khomushku
- Чургуй-оол Намгаевич Хомушку; Чүргүй-оол Намгай оглу Хомушку
- Born: 10 May 1918; Khondelen village, Uryankhay Krai
- Died: 10 July 1978 (aged 60); Bert-Dag village, Tes-Khemsky District, Tuvan ASSR, Russian SFSR, USSR
- Military career
- Allegiance: (Tuvan People's Republic) Tuva; Soviet Union
- Branch: Red Army
- Service years: 1943–1948
- Rank: Lieutenant
- Unit: 25th Separate Tank Regiment
- Conflicts: World War II
- Awards: Hero of the Soviet Union

Churguy-ool Namgaevich Khomushku (Russian: Чургуй-оол Намгаевич Хомушку, Tuvan: Чүргүй-оол Намгай оглу Хомушку; 10 May 1918 – 10 July 1978) was an officer in the Red Army and a recipient of the title Hero of the Soviet Union.

== Early life ==
Khomushku was born on 1918 in the Khondelen village, to a family of peasants. He graduated from six classes in school and later became a cattle breeder at a collective farm. In 1936, Khomushku was drafted into the ranks of the Tuvan People's Revolutionary Army. It was there that he became a member of the Tuvan People's Revolutionary Party.

After serving in the army, he became a chauffeur. And in 1941, he was awarded the Certificate of Honour from the Little Khural of the Republic.

== World War II ==
In June 1941, following the start of Operation Barbarossa, the Tuvan People's Republic entered the war on the side of the Soviet Union. Khomushku submitted an application for sending him to the front as a volunteer, and his request was granted. On May 20, 1943, Khomushku, as part of the first group of volunteers from the Tuvan People's Republic, went to the front. For some time, Tuvan volunteers underwent military training in the city of Gorky in Russian SFSR. In February 1944, the Tuvan volunteers were assigned to the 25th Separate Tank Regiment. The regiment became part of the 52nd Army of the 2nd Ukrainian Front.

In March 1944, the regiment took part in the Dnieper–Carpathian Offensive. On March 5, 1944, during a breakthrough of the German defenses near the villages of Ryzhanovka and Kobilyaki in the Cherkasy Oblast at Reichskommissariat Ukraine, the tank driven by Khomushku, burst into the enemy's location at top speed. With fire and caterpillars, the tanks destroyed the German firing points and manpower. Within two hours, together with his crew, Khomushku killed 35 enemy soldiers, and destroyed three anti-tank guns, seven machine guns and two mortars. When the tank commander was wounded, Khomushku took over command of the tank.

A few days later, near the city of Uman, three tanks, one of which was Khomushku's, captured 24 German aircraft, 80 vehicles, and captured up to a hundred enemy soldiers and officers. This opened the way for further offensive. The 25th Separate Tank Regiment took part in battles that liberated Moldova, and fought in Romania and Hungary. His unit celebrated Victory Day in Czechoslovakia.

By the decree of the Presidium of the Supreme Soviet of the USSR dated March 24, 1945, Junior Lieutenant Khomushku was awarded the title of Hero of the Soviet Union with the Order of Lenin and the Gold Star medal.

== Later life ==
After returning to his native Tuva after the war, he actively participated in creative work, making contributions to the patriotic education of youth. From 1948, Khomushku was in the reserve. He was elected a deputy of the Supreme Soviet of the USSR from the village of Bert-Dag in the Tes-Khemsky district of Tuvan ASSR. He died on 10 July 1978, at the age of 60.

== Awards and honours ==
Hero of the Soviet Union
Order of Lenin
Order of the Patriotic War, 2nd class
Medal "For the Victory over Germany in the Great Patriotic War 1941–1945"
Jubilee Medal "Twenty Years of Victory in the Great Patriotic War 1941-1945"
Jubilee Medal "In Commemoration of the 100th Anniversary of the Birth of Vladimir Ilyich Lenin"
Jubilee Medal "30 Years of the Soviet Army and Navy"

One of the streets of Kyzyl is named after Khomushku. A bust of him is installed on the square near the obelisk to the fallen soldiers, at the entrance to the city park in Kyzyl. In 2005, to mark the 60th anniversary of the victory in the Great Patriotic War, a Yakovlev Yak-42 of Interavia Airlines with tail number RA 42429, was named in his honor.
