= Boris Kabishev =

Soviet WWII fighter pilot and military general (1922–1998)

Boris Dmitrievich Kabishev
- Борис Дмитриевич Кабишев
- Born: 17 October 1922; Gusarnikovo, Rostovsky Uyezd, Yaroslavl Governorate, RSFSR
- Died: 5 December 1998 (aged 76); Moscow
- Burial place: Troyekurovskoye Cemetery
- Military career
- Allegiance: Soviet Union
- Branch: Soviet Air Defence Forces
- Service years: 1941–1980
- Rank: Lieutenant general
- Commands: 3rd Air Defence Corps; 11th Air Defence Army
- Conflicts: World War II; Leningrad-Novgorod Offensive; Baltic Offensive
- Awards: Hero of the Soviet Union; Order of Lenin (2x); Order of the Red Banner; Order of Alexander Nevsky; Order of the Patriotic War, 1st class (2x); Order of the Red Star (3x)

Boris Dmitrievich Kabishev (Russian: Борис Дмитриевич Кабишев; 17 October 1922 – 5 December 1998) was a Soviet Air Defence Forces (PVO) Lieutenant general and Hero of the Soviet Union. Kabishev flew the Ilyushin Il-2 in combat from July 1943, making 112 sorties and shooting down an enemy aircraft. For these actions he received the title Hero of the Soviet Union. After the war Kabishev held command positions in the Soviet Air Force and graduated from the Air Force Academy and Military Academy of the General Staff. After graduation from the Military Academy of the General Staff, Kabishev led the 3rd Air Defense Corps and 11th Air Defence Army, as well as advising the Polish Country Air Defence Force. Before retirement in 1980, Kabishev served as the deputy commander of the PVO for combat training. After retirement, Kabishev lived in Moscow and worked at the USSR State Committee for Hydrometeorology.

== Early life ==
Kabishev was born on 17 October 1922 in the village of Gusarnikovo in Yaroslavl Governorate in the family of a public servant. He spent his childhood and teenage years in Lyuban. In 1939 Kabishev graduated from tenth grade and in 1940 from a trade school in Leningrad. Between July and October, he worked as a mechanic at Leningrad Factory No. 212. In April 1941, Kabishev graduated from the 1st Leningrad Flying Club. He was drafted into the Red Army in April 1941.

== World War II ==
Kabishev graduated from the Tambov Air Force Pilot School in May 1943. He joined the Communist Party of the Soviet Union around this time. He received the rank of Junior Lieutenant on 11 May. From July 1943 he fought in combat as a senior pilot, flight leader and squadron leader in the 958th Attack Aviation Regiment, flying the Il-2. In July and August, Kabishev fought in the Mga Offensive. He was wounded on 30 July. Kabishev was promoted to Lieutenant on 29 October. On 5 November he was awarded his first Order of the Red Star. During January and February 1944 he fought in the Leningrad–Novgorod Offensive. On 15 March Kabishev was awarded the Order of the Red Banner for his actions. On 24 May he was promoted to Senior lieutenant. In July Kabishev participated in the Pskov-Ostrov Offensive. During the summer of 1944 he fought in the Baltic Offensive. On 28 August Kabishev was awarded the Order of Alexander Nevsky. He was awarded the Order of the Patriotic War 1st class on 4 October. On 23 October Kabishev was promoted to captain. In late November 1944 Kabishev's regiment was withdrawn from combat to retrain on the Ilyushin Il-10. He had made a total of 112 sorties, shooting down one and sharing credit for two other enemy aircraft. For his actions, Kabishev was awarded the title Hero of the Soviet Union and the Order of Lenin on 23 February 1945.

== Postwar ==
On 20 January 1949, Kabishev received the rank of major. Until 1951, Kabishev served in Air Force combat units. He was navigator, squadron commander and deputy commander of an assault regiment in the Moscow Military District. On 14 April 1952, Kabishev was promoted to lieutenant colonel. He then studied at the Air Force Academy at Monino, from which he graduated in 1955. Kabishev became commander of a fighter aviation regiment and then a towing regiment in the Moscow Air Defence District. On 29 April 1956, Kabishev was promoted to colonel. On 30 December 1956 he was awarded a second Order of the Red Star. Between 1959 and 1963 he led a separate research aviation division in Central Asia. Kabishev was promoted to major general on 9 May 1961. In 1965, Kabishev graduated from the Military Academy of the General Staff. He became deputy commander of the 7th Air Defence Corps at Bryansk. Between 1966 and 1967 he led the 3rd Air Defence Corps at Yaroslavl. In April 1967 Kabishev became an assistant of the Warsaw Pact Supreme Command to the Polish Country Air Defence Force. On 22 February 1968 Kabishev received his third Order of the Red Star. In 1970 he was given command of the 3rd Air Defence Corps again. He received the rank of lieutenant general on 23 February 1972. In August 1973 Kabishev became commander of the 11th Separate Air Defence Army in the Far East. In July 1973 he became deputy commander of the PVO for combat training. On 17 February 1975 he received a second Order of Lenin. He retired in January 1980.

Between 1983 and 1986, Kabishev was a department head in the Proletarsky Raion Executive Committee of Moscow. On 11 March 1985 he was awarded a second Order of the Patriotic War 1st class on the 40th anniversary of the end of World War II. He then was a department head and deputy head of the USSR State Committee for Hydrometeorology between 1986 and 1991. He lived in Moscow and died on 5 December 1998. Kabishev was buried in the Troyekurovskoye Cemetery.

== Awards and honors ==
USSR and Russia

Hero of the Soviet Union (23 February 1945)
Order of Lenin, twice (23 February 1945, 17 February 1975)
Order of the Red Banner (15 March 1944)
Order of Alexander Nevsky (38 August 1944)
Order of the Patriotic War, 1st class, twice (4 October 1944, 11 March 1985)
Order of the Red Star, thrice (5 November 1943, 30 December 1956, 22 February 1968)
Medal "For Battle Merit" (19 November 19151)
Medal of Zhukov
Medal "For Distinction in Guarding the State Border of the USSR"
Medal "For the Defence of Leningrad" (1942)
Medal "For the Victory over Germany in the Great Patriotic War 1941–1945" (9 May 1945)

- jubilee medals

Foreign

Medal "100 Years of Liberation from Ottoman Slavery" (Bulgaria)
Medal of Victory and Freedom 1945 (Poland)
