= Arkady Kaplunov =

Soviet colonel (1912–1943)

- Native name: Арка́дий Льво́вич Каплуно́в
- Born: 21 January 1912; Glukhov, Russian Empire
- Died: 22 October 1943 (aged 31) Khodoriv
- Allegiance: Soviet Union
- Branch: 3rd Guards Tank Army
- Service years: 1934–1943
- Rank: Colonel
- Conflicts: World War II; Invasion of Poland; Winter War; Eastern Front †
- Awards: Hero of the Soviet Union

Arkady Lvovich Kaplunov (Russian: Арка́дий Льво́вич Каплуно́в; (January 21, 1912, Glukhov, Chernigov province - October 22, 1943, the village of Khodoriv, Myronivka Raion, Kyiv Oblast) was a Guard Colonel, Hero of the Soviet Union, and deputy political commander of the 54th Guards Tank Brigade, 7th Guards Tank Corps, 3rd Guards Tank Army, Voronezh Front.

== Biography ==
He was born on January 21, 1912, in the city of Glukhov, Chernihiv province (now the Sumy Oblast of Ukraine) into a Jewish family. He received an incomplete secondary education.

He worked as a weaver, then as a manager at the Sumy cloth factory.

After graduating from evening school, he was deputy editor of the Sumy newspaper "Plow and Molot" (Серп и молот), and then secretary of the Komsomol committee at the state farm “III International”.

In January 1934 he enlisted in the Red Army. In 1935 he graduated from the school of junior lieutenants.

He participated in a campaign in Western Ukraine and Western Belarus in 1939, during the Soviet-Finnish war of 1939–1940.

From June 1941 he participated in the Great Patriotic War. He fought on the Southwestern and Voronezh fronts.

On September 24, 1943, near the village of Trakhtemyriv, Kanevsky district, Cherkasy Oblast, he crossed the Dnieper. At a critical moment, he led the tank towards the enemy, enticing his comrades by personal example, and turned the tide of an already lost battle.

He died on October 22, 1943, in the offensive near the village of Khodorov (Mironovsky district, Kiev region).

He was buried in the Central Park in the city of Pereiaslav, Kiev Oblast.

A street in the city of Pereyaslav is named after Kaplunov.

By decree of the Presidium of the Supreme Soviet of the USSR of November 17, 1943, for the courage and bravery shown in the battles for the Dnieper, Guards Colonel Arkady Lvovich Kaplunov was awarded the title of Hero of the Soviet Union (posthumously). He was awarded with the Order of Lenin, two Orders of the Red Banner, and Order of the Red Star (1941) medals.

== Books ==
- Герои Советского Союза: Краткий биографический словарь / Пред. ред. коллегии И. Н. Шкадов. — М.: Воениздат, 1987. — Т. 1 /Абаев — Любичев/. — 911 с. — 100 000 экз. — ISBN отс., Рег. No. в РКП 87-95382
