= Sevastyan Kruchyonykh =

Soviet military pilot (1909–1975)

Sevastyan Kruchyonykh, memorial plaque

Sevastyan Kruchyonykh (Russian: Севастьян Петрович Кручёных; 1909–1975) was a Soviet naval pilot, participant in World War II, Hero of the Soviet Union (July 24, 1943), colonel (January 30, 1953), held a number of commanding positions, discharged in 1955. During the war Kruchyonykh carried out 493 missions.

== Decorations ==
- Order of Lenin (1943, goes with the title of the Hero of the Soviet Union)
- Order of the Red Banner (1942, 1951)
- Order of Alexander Nevsky (1945)
- Order of the Patriotic War of the 1st degree (1944)
- Order of the Red Star (1946, 1955)
- A number of medals
