= Viktor Kazakov (lieutenant) =

Soviet air force lieutenant

- Russian: Виктор Фёдорович Казаков
- Born: 10 February 1923; Putkovskaya, Vichugsky District, Ivanovo Oblast, Russian Soviet Federative Socialist Republic, Soviet Union
- Died: 24 January 1995 (aged 71); Moscow, Russian Soviet Federative Socialist Republic, Soviet Union
- Military career
- Allegiance: Soviet Union
- Branch: Soviet Air Force
- Service years: 1940–1946
- Rank: Lieutenant
- Unit: 21st Operational Brigade
- Conflicts: World War II; Eastern Front
- Awards: Hero of the Soviet Union

Viktor Kazakov – (Russian: Виктор Фёдорович Казаков; 10 February 1923 – 1 January 1995) was a Soviet air force lieutenant who fought on the Eastern Front. In 1946, Kazakov was named a Hero of the Soviet Union.

The Red Army drafted Kazakov in 1940. A year later, he graduated from the military aviation pilot school and in 1943-1945 fought at the Eastern Front. Kazakov participated in the Crimean offensive. After the operation's success, Kazakov was transferred to Belarus where he was appointed flight commander and led groups of attack aircraft into the battles. By May 1945, Kazakov made 174 sorties to bombard and attack enemy manpower and equipment, destroyed 18 tanks, up to 80 vehicles, over 40 field and anti-aircraft warfare, five small ships, seven fuel tanks, hundreds of Nazi soldiers.

After the end of the war, Kazakov graduated from the legal institute and worked at the Leningrad Regional Committee of the Communist Party of the Soviet Union. He died in Moscow on 24 January 1995 and was buried at the Troyekurovskoye Cemetery.

== Awards ==
- Hero of the Soviet Union (1946)
- Order of the Red Banner
- Order of the Patriotic War
- Order of the Patriotic War
- Order of the Badge of Honour
