= List of World War II aces from the Soviet Union =

This is a list of fighter aces in World War II from the Soviet Union.

This color, along with the corresponding footnote, indicates that a listed person's ace status is disputed.

Name	Total	Individual victories	shared victories	Notes	References
Grigory Rechkalov	65	61	4	Or 56 solo and 5 shared.	
Ivan Kozhedub	64	64	—	Estimates vary slightly, but all credit him with at least 60 solo.	
Nikolai Gulaev	60	55	5	—	
Kirill Yevstigneyev	56	53	3	—	
Dmitry Glinka	50	50	—	—	
Alexander Pokryshkin	49	45	4	Estimates widely vary; recent estimates tend to be less than official Soviet accounts.	
Amet-khan Sultan	49	30	19	—	
Alexander Koldunov	47	46	1	—	
Nikolai Skomorokhov	47	44	3	Other sources indicate two shared kills	
Arseny Vorozheykin	46	45	1	Also gained aerial victories in the battle for Khalkhin Gol	
Andrey Borovykh	46	29	17	—	
Vladimir Serov	45	39	6	Including one aerial ramming.	
Vladimir Lavrinenkov	43	36	7	Some sources indicate 11 shared kills.	
Aleksey Ryazanov	43	31	12	Some sources indicate 16 instead of 12 shared kills.	
Fyodor Arkhipenko	43	28	15	—	
Nikolai Krasnov	42	41	1	Other estimates indicate up to 44 solo shootdowns.	
Sergey Morgunov	41	41	—	—	
Mikhail Pivovarov	41	40	1	—	
Ivan Stepanenko	41	32	9	—	
Vitaly Popkov	40	40	—	—	
Ivan Babak	40	35	5	—	
Pyotr Gnido	40	34	6	—	
Mikhail Komelkov	40	33	7	—	
Andrey Baklan	41	20	21	Or 17 solo and one shared.	
Ivan Likhobabin	39	32	7	—	
Pavel Kamozin	38	34	4	—	
Valentin Makarov	38	28	10	—	
Ivan Maslov	38	23	15	—	
Ivan Fyodorov	37	37	—	Including one aerial ramming	
Nikolai Artamonov	37	28	9	—	
Ilya Shmelyov	37	27	10	Or 26 solo and one shared.	
Vasily Mikhalyov	37	23	14	Or 22 solo and four shared.	
Aleksey Smirnov	36	35	1	—	
Aleksandr Karpov	36	27	9	—	
Konstantin Kovalyov	36	22	14	Or 19 solo and 12 shared.	
Sergey Lugansky	35	34	1	Other sources indicate 36 solo and two shared.	
Fyodor Chubukov	35	30	5	—	
Andrey Kulagin	35	30	5	—	
Aleksey Alelyukhin	34	28	6	—	
Mikhail Mudrov	34	26	8	Estimates slightly vary.	
Vladimir Bobrov	34	23	11	—	
Stepan Novichkov	34	33	1	—	
Aleksandr Klubov	34	31	3	—	
Vladimir Merkulov	33	29	4	—	
Konstantin Novikov	33	28	5	Other estimates include 28 solo and 3 shared, or alternatively 31 solo and nine shared.	
Pavel Babaylov	33	27	6	—	
Nikolai Zelenov	33	24	9	—	
Nikolai Ignatev	33	22	11	Includes one aerial ramming.	
Nikolai Kuznetsov	33	21	12	—	
Pavel Tarasov	32	31	1	—	
Mikhail Zelyonkin	32	28	4	—	
Ivan Romanenko	32	29	3	—	
Anatoly Grachyov	32	25	7	—	
Aleksandr Lobanov	32	24	8	—	
Aleksey Reshetov	32	22	10	—	
Aleksandr Dyachkov	31	30	1	—	
Sergey Glinkin	31	30	1	Plus one aerostat.	
Pavel Golovachev	31	30	1	—	
Ivan Kravtsov	31	27	4	—	
Ivan Zudilov	31	26	5	—	
Viktor Nagornyy	31	25	6	—	
Aleksandr Kochetov	31	20	11	—	
Viktor Kirilyuk	30	29	1	—	
Vasily Kurochkin	30	27	3	—	
Aleksandr Lavrenov	30	27	3	—	
Pyotr Likholetov	30	23	7	—	
Ivan Borisov	30	22	8	—	
Aleksey Murashev	30	22	8	—	
Andrey Chirkov	30	22	8	—	
Vasily Markov	29	29	—	—	
Mikhail Sachkov	29	29	—	—	
Boris Glinka	29	27	2	—	
Shalva Kiria	29	27	2	—	
Aleksandr Kumanichkin	29	27	2	—	
Anatoly Tyutin	29	27	2	—	
Nikolai Kitaev	29	24	5	—	
Nikolai Rudenko	29	24	5	—	
Aleksey Gubanov	29	23	6	—	
Ilya Pavlovsky	29	20	9	—	
Aleksey Solomatin	29	13	16	Or six shared	
Dmitry Medvedev	29	14	15	—	
Sergey Gorelov	28	27	1	—	
Ivan Kornienko	28	26	2	—	
Spartak Makovsky	28	25	3	—	
Ivan Sytov	28	25	3	—	
Mikhail Pogorelov	28	23	5		
Pavel Kutakhov	28	12	16	—	
Igor Kaberov	28	10	18	—	
Boris Kovzan	28	28	—	Four individual kills were aerial rammings. Ace status disputed; not listed in Bykov's collection of aces.	
Sergey Safronov	28	24	4	—	
Nikolai Dunaev	28	21	7	—	
Viktor Yashin	27	26	1	—	
Yegor Vasilevsky	27	25	2	—	
Valentin Vedeneev	27	24	3	—	
Aleksandr Laukhin	27	24	3	—	
Arkady Kovachevich	27	20	7	—	
Pyotr Pokryshev	27	18	9	Other sources credit more unconfirmed kills.	
Nikolai Gusarov	27	16	11	—	
Aleksey Churilin	26	26	—	—	
Pavel Dolgaryov	26	26	—	—	
Ivan Leonovich	26	26	—	—	
Akop Manukyan	26	26	—	—	
Boris Rogov	26	26	—	—	
Ivan Sklyarov	26	26	—	—	
Pyotr Grishchenko	26	25	1	—	
Andrey Trud	26	25	1	—	
Pavel Chepinoga	26	25	1	—	
Ivan Kuznetsov	26	23	3	—	
Vasily Barsukov	26	22	4	—	
Aleksandr Sitkovsky	25	25	—	—	
Aleksey Yegorov	25	25	—	—	
Dmitry Yermakov	25	25	—	—	
Vasily Bondarenko	25	24	1	—	
Ivan Gorbunov	25	24	1	—	
Anatoly Kozhevnikov	25	23	2	—	
Viktor Suvirov	25	23	2	—	
Konstantin Krasavin	25	22	3	—	
Pavel Muravyov	25	22	3	—	
Boris Safonov	25	20	5	Western sources typically indicate a higher tally.	
Mikhail Baranov	24	24	—	—	
Vladimir Denisenko	24	24	—	—	
Ivan Laveykin	24	24	—	—	
Vasily Merkushev	24	24	—	—	
Ivan Popov	24	24	—	—	
Vasily Zaitsev	24	24	—	Also credited with having 34 personal and 19 shared victories.	
Ivan Borisenko	24	23	1	—	
Ivan Tabakov	24	23	1	—	
Yevgeny Savitsky	24	22	2	Or eighteen solo and one shared.	
Viktor Aleksandryuk	24	21	3	—	
Arkady Fyodorov	24	20	4	Estimates vary slightly.	
Lev Shestakov	24	16	8	Does not include two solo plus one shared victory from Spanish Civil War.	
Aleksey Khlobystov	24	6	18	Some estimates credit 7 solo and 24 shared consisting of three instead of two aerial rammings.	
Vazgen Oganesov	23	23	—	—	
Vasily Rogozhin	23	23	—	—	
Nikolai Surnev	23	23	—	—	
Mikhail Mazan	23	20	3	—	
Fyodor Mitrofanov	23	20	3	—	
Nikolai Pechyonyy	23	20	3	—	
Vasily Sidorenkov	23	20	3	—	
Aleksandr Bastrikov	23	22	1	—	
Pavel Gavrilin	23	22	1	—	
Konstantin Komardinkin	23	22	1	—	
Aleksandr Bilyukin	23	21	2	—	
Nikolai Bykasov	23	21	2	—	
Semyon Kratinov	23	21	2	—	
Leonty Slizen	23	21	2	—	
Leonid Bykovets	23	19	4	—	
Mikhail Kuznetsov	23	19	4	Possibly one shared.	
Ivan Kleshchyov	23	13	10	—	
Viktor Dudnichenko	22	22	—	—	
Anatoly Konstantinov	22	22	—	—	
Viktor Merenkov	22	22	—	—	
Vitaly Mikryukov	22	22	—	—	
Nikolai Miokov	22	22	—	—	
Konstantin Sukhov	22	22	—	—	
Vladimir Yegorovich	22	22	—	—	
Ilya Andrianov	22	21	1	—	
Pyotr Nikonorov	22	21	1	—	
Leonid Ryzhy	22	21	1	—	
Fyodor Shikunov	22	21	1	—	
Dmitry Ashchaulov	22	20	2	—	
Sergey Burnazyan	22	20	2	—	
Aleksandr Karasyov	22	20	2	Gained additional shootdowns in the Korean war.	
Nikolai Lavitsky	22	20	2	—	
Nikolai Pinchuk	22	20	2	—	
Nikolai Naydyonov	22	18	4	—	
Sergey Ivanov	21	21	—	—	
Nikolai Leonov	21	21	—	—	
Vyacheslav Sirotin	21	21	—	—	
Aleksandr Vybornov	21	21	—	—	
Aleksandr Karaev	21	20	1	—	
Sergey Lazarev	21	20	1	—	
Andrey Fedotov	21	20	1	—	
Vasily Ziborov	21	20	1	—	
Oleg Smirnov	21	21	—	—	
Andrey Girich	21	17	4	—	
Chichiko Bendeliani	21	9	12	—	
Nikolai Belousov	20	20	—	—	
Dmitry Gudkov	20	20	—	—	
Adil Guliyev	20	20	—	—	
Vasily Mukhin	20	20	—	—	
Yakov Ovodov	20	20	—	—	
Vladimir Semyonov	20	20	—	—	
Ivan Somov	20	20	—	—	
Aleksandr Shishkin	20	20	—	—	
Ivan Vitkovsky	20	20	—	—	
Ivan Vishnyakov	20	20	—	—	
Aleksandr Voronko	20	20	—	—	
Pyotr Yakubovsky	20	20	—	—	
Boris Zhigulyonkov	20	20	—	—	
Pyotr Bazanov	20	18	2	—	
Nikolai Shutt	20	18	2	—	
Alim Baisultanov	18	5	13	—	
Georgy Baevsky	19	19	—	—	
Daniil Barchenkov	19	19	—	Estimates vary slightly, with some indicating 21 shootdowns.	
Georgy Kuzmin	19	18	1	Estimates vary slightly, with some indicating 21 solo and 7 shared.	
Shamil Abdrashitov	18	18	—	—	
Alexander Kabiskoy	17	17	—	Includes one aerostat.	
Ivan Kuzmichyov	17	15	2	—	
Semyon Bychkov	15	10	5	Taken prisoner, served in Luftwaffe, and executed by USSR for treason on 4 November 1946.	
Luka Muravitsky	15	5	10	—	
Stepan Bakhaev	15	12	3	Gained additional shootdowns in the Korean War.	
Anatoly Morozov	14	11	3	—	
Vasily Afonin	13	11	2	Possibly 14 solo and 3 shared.	
Georgy Lobov	13	10	3	Counts vary slightly. Credited with additional shootdowns during the Korean War.	
Ivan Taranenko	13	6	7	Ace status disputed, some indicate only four solo and three shared.	
Emir Chalbash	12	8	4	Some credit 11 solo and 6 shared.	
Zakhar Sorokin	11	11	—	—	
Aleksandr Babaev	10	9	1	—	
Aleksandr Gridnev	9	5	4	—	
Lydia Litvyak	8	5	3	Does not include one observation balloon. Counts vary significantly.	
Aleksey Maresyev	7	7	—	Other sources report up to 11 shootdowns	
Aleksandr Avdeev	5	5	—	—	

== See also ==
- Category:Soviet World War II flying aces
- List of World War II aces by country
