= Kulagin =

Kulagin (Russian: Кулагин) is a Russian masculine surname, its feminine counterpart is Kulagina. It may refer to:

- Aleksandr Kulagin (born 1954), Russian rower
- Andrey Kulagin
- Boris Kulagin (1924–1988), Russian ice hockey player
- Dmitry Kulagin (born 1992), Russian basketball player
- Leonid Kulagin (born 1940), Russian actor, film director and screenwriter
- Mikhail Kulagin
- Nina Kulagina (1926–1990), Russian woman who claimed to have psychic powers
- Valentina Kulagina (1902–1987), Russian painter and graphical designer
