= Sergey Morgunov =

Sergey Morgunov (Russian: Сергей Моргунов may refer to:

- Sergey Morgunov (pilot) (1918-1946), Soviet flying ace
- Sergey Morgunov (athlete) (b. 1993), Russian track and field athlete
