= Lugansky (surname) =

Lugansky (feminine: Luganskaya) is a Russian-language surname derived from the city of Lugansk. Notable people with the surname include:

- Nikolai Lugansky (born 1972), Russian pianist
- Sergey Lugansky (1917–1977), Soviet ace
