= Mikhail Olenin =

- Михаил Петрович Оленин
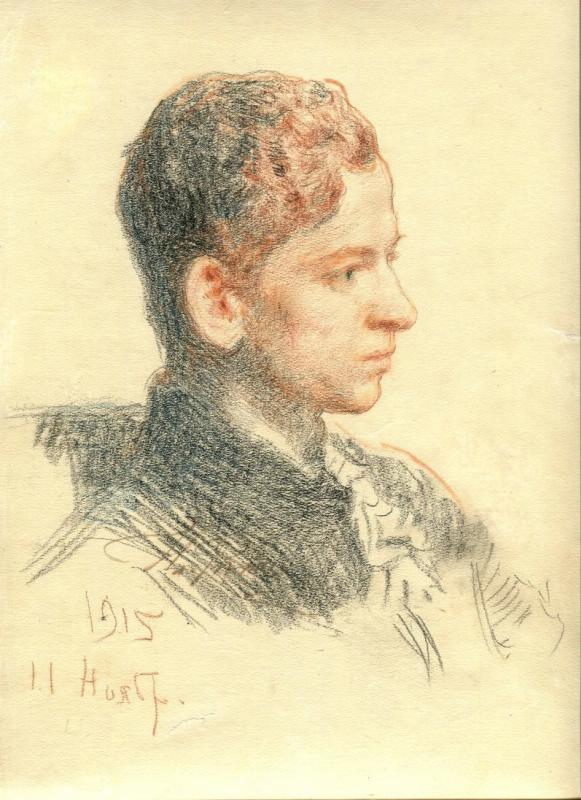
- Portrait drawing by Ilya Repin, November 1915; Priyutino Estate Museum, Vsevolozhsk
- Born: 25 April [O.S. 13 April] 1896; Nizhny Novgorod, Russian Empire
- Died: 4 November 1970 (aged 73); Moscow, USSR
- Resting place: Novodevichy Cemetery, Moscow
- Citizenship: Russian Empire, Soviet Union
- Known for: Portrait busts

Mikhail Petrovich Olenin (Russian: Михаил Петрович Оленин; 25 April [O.S. 13 April] 1896 — 4 November 1970) was a Soviet realist sculptor who made many busts of famous pilots and doctors.

== Biography ==
He was born on 25 April [O.S. 13 April] 1896 to a Jewish family in Nizhny Novgorod. He was adopted by the singer Pyotr Olenin and took his surname and patronymic.

In 1914 he entered the Moscow School of Painting, Sculpture and Architecture and later studied at Vkhutemas. His teachers included Sergey Volnukhin, Sergey Konenkov, and Anna Golubkina. He graduated from Vkhutemas in 1923. He considered Mark Antokolsky Auguste Rodin and Vera Mukhina as his inspirations.

Under the instructions of Alexander Golovanov, he made busts of Soviet pilots of World War II. He made busts of many famous pilots, including but not limited to double Heroes of the Soviet Union Aleksey Alelyukhin, Amet-khan Sultan, Vladimir Lavrinenkov, Alexander Molodchy, and Nikolai Skomorokhov. On 18 September 1945, a personal exhibition of his works were displayed at Central Officers' House of Pilots, showcasing 28 busts of pilots made by him.
