= Amet-khan Sultan =

Soviet Crimean Tatar flying ace (1920–1971)

- Amethan Sultan
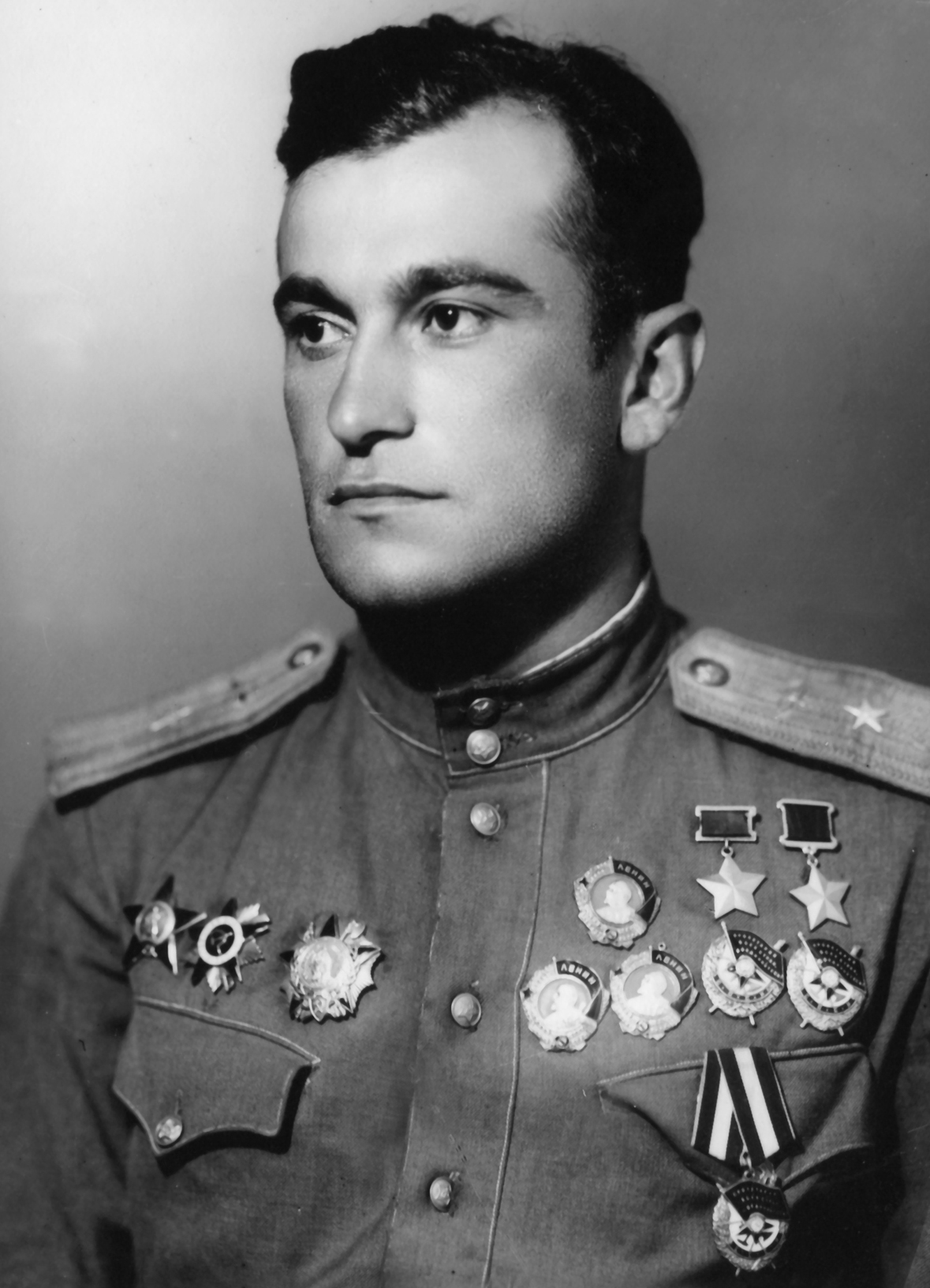
- Amet-khan in 1945
- Born: 20 October 1920; Alupka, Crimea, South Russia (now Ukraine)
- Died: 1 February 1971 (aged 50); Moscow Oblast, Russian SFSR, Soviet Union
- Burial place: Novodevichy Cemetery
- Spouse: Faina Maksimova Danilchenko
- Relatives: Stanislav Amet-khan (eldest son); Arslan Amet-khan (youngest son); Veronika Amet-khan (granddaughter); Margarita Amet-khan (granddaughter)
- Military career
- Allegiance: Soviet Union
- Branch: Soviet Air Force
- Rank: Lieutenant colonel
- Nicknames: "The Eagle" "King of the taran"
- Unit: 9th Guards Fighter Aviation Regiment
- Conflicts: World War II
- Awards: Hero of the Soviet Union (twice); Order of Lenin (three times); Order of the Red Banner (four times); Honoured Test Pilot of the USSR; Stalin prize

Amet-khan Sultan (Crimean Tatar: Amet-Han Sultan, Амет-Хан Султан, احمدخان سلطان; Ukrainian/Russian: Амет-Хан Султан; 20 October 1920 – 1 February 1971) was a highly decorated Crimean Tatar flying ace in the Soviet Air Force with 30 personal and 19 shared kills. He was twice awarded the title Hero of the Soviet Union.

Despite having been able to avoid deportation to Uzbekistan, due to his father's Lak background, he refused to change his passport nationality listing to Lak or identify as one throughout his entire life, even when faced with pressure from government organs. After the end of the war, he worked as a test pilot at the Flight Research Institute in Zhukovsky and mastered piloting 96 different aircraft types before he was killed in a crash while testing a new engine on a modified Tupolev Tu-16 bomber. He remains memorialized throughout Ukraine and Russia, with streets, schools, and airports named after him as well as a museum dedicated to his memory.

== Early life ==
Amet-Khan Sultan was born on 20 October 1920 to a Crimean Tatar mother and a Lak father in Alupka, Crimea, then part of the short-lived state of South Russia (now Ukraine) during the Russian Civil War. In 1937, he graduated from secondary school and later studied at the rail workers' school in Simferopol as well as at the aeroclub based at Zavodskoe Airport, where he graduated from flight training in 1938 while he was employed as a fitter at a local railway depot. In February 1939, he joined the Red Army and was sent for further training at the Kacha Higher Military Aviation School of Pilots, which he graduated from in 1940, and was assigned to the 122nd Fighter Aviation Regiment. Amet-khan's name would occasionally attract mockery from his peers, but he himself would often poke fun at his name, joking that "I myself am both the Khan and the Sultan." Most of his friends and family would refer to him as Amet-khan, not Sultan.

== In World War II ==
When Nazi Germany invaded the Soviet Union in 1941, Amet-khan was a pilot in the 4th Fighter Aviation Regiment and immediately deployed to the front lines to carry out defensive sorties flying the obsolete Polikarpov I-153 over Rostov-on-Don. In winter 1942 after suffering high casualties the regiment was retrained and taught to fly the newer Hawker Hurricane. In March 1942, the regiment was deployed to defend the city of Yaroslavl, during which Amet-khan scored his first aerial victory on 31 May 1942. He rammed a Junkers-88 bomber with his fighter after running out of ammunition, striking it on the left wing head-on while flying upwards and slicing off the wing. He managed to jump out of his burning plane and parachute to the ground, with minor injuries to his arm and head, some from having slammed his head into the dashboard of the cockpit. He landed on a farm where a worker pointed a pitchfork at him because the worker was worried Amet-khan was one of the Luftwaffe pilots, but after folding over his pilot's coat and showing the farmer his Order of the Red Star, they showed him respect and inspected the site where the planes fell. The two pilots of the Ju 88 were identified by villagers while Amet-khan rested. Amet-khan stayed on that farm for a night to recover and was visited by the regiment commissar, who woke him up and congratulated him on his successful attack. He soon returned to his regiment to fly again after a brief stay in the hospital, where he came to be teased by several of his fellow pilots for ramming his plane upwards instead of ramming downward, smashing only the landing gear of the plane against the Ju 88, which might have enabled him to make a belly-landing and walk away without a scratch. The bomber turned out to have been on a reconnaissance mission, making the sacrifice of his plane less of a loss to the Soviet Air Force. For the victory, he was presented with an engraved watch in the Yaroslavl city square and later awarded the Order of Lenin.

In the summer of 1942, Amet-khan scored nine more aerial victories, most of them while flying in groups over Voronezh in a Hawker Hurricane before he was reassigned in August to Stalingrad, where he piloted a Yak-7B and was praised by his commanders for being one of the first in the regiment to engage an enemy fighter at night. He briefly piloted a Yak-1 over Voronezh that summer and did not score any aerial victories during that time, but later in the war he scored several victories while flying one. In the Battle of Stalingrad he quickly increased his tally and was reassigned in October to the prestigious 9th Guards Fighter Aviation Regiment, which had been reorganized to be composed entirely of flying aces to counter German air offensives in the area. The regiment included Mikhail Baranov, the most successful Soviet ace at the time, and Lydia "Lily" Litvak, the first female flying ace. Over Stalingrad in August 1942 Amet-khan had to parachute out of his plane for a second time after his Yak-7B was shot down. From November 1942 until the end of the war he remained the commander of the third squadron of the 9th Guards Fighter Aviation Regiment.

After retraining to fly a Bell P-39 Airacobra in 1943, he fought over Rostov-on-Don and saw heavy combat over the Kuban area as part of the campaign to retake control of Taganrog, Melitopol, and the Crimean Peninsula. On 24 August 1943, he was awarded the title Hero of the Soviet Union for his success in contributing to the aerial defense on the Southern, Bryansk, and Stalingrad fronts, as well as over Moldova, southern Ukraine, and Yaroslavl. Although not recorded in official Soviet documents, British historians Thomas Polak and Christopher Shores attributed a second aerial ramming of a Ju 88 to Amet-khan, which took place over the Battle of Stalingrad in winter of 1943. Only seventeen Soviet pilots are known to have executed two aerial rammings; two Soviet pilots executed three rammings, and one pilot, Boris Kovzan, who committed four, holds the record for most aerial rammings.

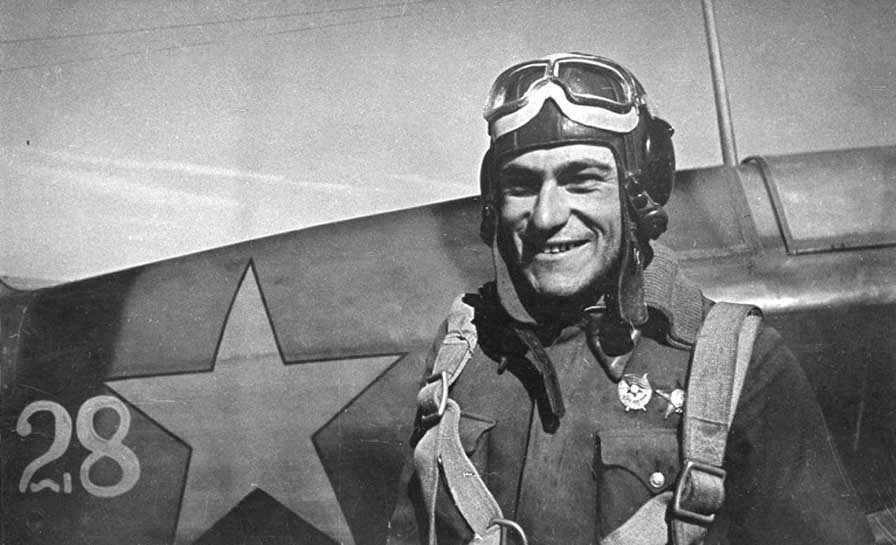
Amet-khan Sultan by his Yak-7 fighter in Stalingrad

From 18 to 20 May 1944, he was permitted to take a three-day vacation from combat to visit his family in Alupka, not long after the Soviets retook control of Crimea. He brought several of his friends, including fellow Hero of the Soviet Union Pavel Golovachev. One morning, an NKVD officer barged into Amet-khan's house and attempted to force Amet-khan and his parents to leave Crimea, but they initially refused to leave. A struggle ensued until Amet-khan identified himself as a Hero of the Soviet Union to the NKVD officer who had attacked him, and his status as a war hero was confirmed by Pavel Golovachev who was present at the scene. The NKVD officer then began questioning him about his ethnic background, decided that Amet-khan was technically Dagestani; he explained that there was an order to deport the entire Crimean Tatar people, and that his brother Imran was wanted for collaborating with the Germans. Throughout the day, the NKVD continued to deport the Crimean Tatar people. Amet-khan's mother, who was a Crimean Tatar, was sent to a transportation point, but other members of the Air Force made it clear to the NKVD that she and the rest of her immediate family were exempt from deportation because she was married to a Lak and hence no longer considered a Crimean Tatar in the eyes of the law. She and her husband were spared deportation; however, they were advised to temporarily relocate to Dagestan, for the time being. Eventually Imran was sentenced in 1946, but Amet-khan's parents still were allowed to live in Crimea.

After witnessing the violent deportation, Amet-khan returned to his regiment and continued to distinguish himself in battle, but suffered from severe depression. He flew a Lavochkin La-7 in the later parts of the war in campaigns over Königsberg, Berlin, and East Prussia. In the Battle of Königsberg he and his regiment flew with a group of French pilots from the Normandie-Niemen regiment. Amet-khan saved the life of one of his comrades over Königsberg. After Chubukov and Khvostov engaged with a group of six fighters, two German fighters went down while taking out Khvostov. Chubukov was surrounded by the remaining four when Amet-khan rushed toward the fighters and saved Chubukov from being shot down. His thirtieth solo and last aerial victory occurred near Berlin Tempelhof Airport, when he took out a Focke-Wulf Fw 190 on 29 April 1945. For his excellence shown after his first Hero of the Soviet Union award in 1943 over various campaigns, he was awarded a second one on 29 June 1945. In total he scored 30 solo victories, 19 shared victories, flew 603 combat sorties and engaged in 150 aerial battles during the war.

== Postwar life ==
=== Career as a test pilot ===
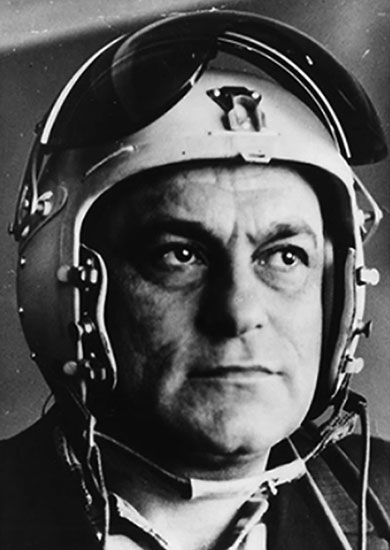
Amet-khan as test pilot

After the war, he initially studied at the Air Force Academy in Monino, as an order by the Supreme Commander of the Soviet Armed Forces required all flying aces that survived the war to attend. However, due to his minimal secondary education, he found the courses difficult and eventually requested permission to drop out of the school. He was allowed to leave in 1946. After abandoning aviation for a while, he fell into a severe depression, as he could not see himself as a civil airline pilot. Eventually, his fighter pilot friends from the war, (including Alexander Pokryshkin, Aleksey Alelyukhin, and Vladimir Lavrinenkov), encouraged him to become a test pilot at the Flight Research Institute in Zhukovsky, which he did in February 1947. Amet-khan quickly rose through the ranks at the institute, reaching the rank of test pilot first class in 1952.

In April 1949, along with Yakov Vernikov, he conducted the first flight of the two-seater Mikoyan-Gurevich I-320 fighter. In June 1949, he and Igor Shelest carried out the first fully automatic mid-air refueling in the Soviet Union; Amet-khan piloted the Yak-15 fighter jet and Shelest flew the Tupolev Tu-2 bomber involved in the procedure. From 1951 to 1953, along with Sergey Anokhin, Fyodor Burtsev, and Vasily Pavlov, he flew manned tests of the KS-1 Komet, an anti-ship air-to-surface missile. During the testing process, Amet-khan was the first pilot to make a flight of the Komet from the ground, doing so on 4 January 1951. In May of the same year, He was also first pilot to start the Komet from an airplane During one test flight, after uncoupling the KS-1, the engine did not start. Instead of immediately parachuting out, he repeated attempts to restart the engine, finally managing to do so not far from hitting the ground, saving the prototype. For his actions in testing the KS-1, he was awarded the Stalin Prize second class; several other members of the team were awarded the gold star. When Amet-khan's nomination for a third gold star reached the desk of Stalin, who had approved the deportation of the Crimean Tatar nation, went into a fit of rage that a Crimean Tatar was allowed to become a test pilot. Upon learning that Amet-khan nearly died while testing the KS-1 to save the prototype, it was decided that he would be awarded the Order of the Red Banner and Stalin Prize second class instead, since awarding a Crimean Tatar a third gold star was unthinkable to the internal ranks of the Soviet Union.

Many of the flights Amet-khan carried out in his career were for tests of the bailout systems for military aircraft, a risky procedure. While flying a MiG-15 so the parachuter Valery Golovin could test the ejection seat designed for the Sukhoi Su-7 and Su-9 aircraft on 12 November 1958, the ejection mechanism fired prematurely, resulting in an explosion that ruptured the fuel tank. The explosion resulted in the ejection seat clamping down on Golovin. The cockpit filled with smoke and gas, limiting his sight while kerosene began filling the cockpit. With the threat of an uncontrollable fire imminent and Golovin unable to parachute out, he managed to make an emergency landing of the stricken fighter, refusing to abandon his comrade even after Golovin and their commander ordered him to evacuate the aircraft and save himself.

From 1958 to 1960, he flew cosmonauts-in-training including Yuri Gagarin on a modified Tu-104 for practicing tasks in weightlessness, starting off as a co-pilot for Yuri Garnaev in the procedure. His other work included testing the NM-1, which he made the first flight in on 7 April 1959, but later tests of the aircraft eventually went to Rady Zakharov after Amet-khan was briefly hospitalized and temporarily grounded from flying due to health complications of long flight work, although he was eventually barred from flying high-speed aircraft altogether. For his work as a test pilot he was awarded the prestigious title "Honoured Test Pilot of the USSR" on 23 September 1961. In his career he mastered 96 aircraft types and accumulated an excess of 4,237 flight hours.

Amet-khan died on 1 February 1971 at the age of 50 while piloting a modified Tu-16. The interior of the cabin was modified to function as a flying laboratory, and the flight was conducted to test a new jet engine. All five airmen aboard the plane were killed in the crash. The cause of the crash remained classified for a long time, leading to speculation about the causes. It was suggested that it was caused by uncontained engine failure from the new engine being tested, but the official conclusion released to the public stated that the crash was caused by breakage of the outer flaps, which were in landing position when the plane was accelerating to an instrument speed of over 500 km/h, leading to the aircraft flipping and breaking up mid-air. The exact reason for why or how the flaps were positioned that way have not been determined, since the fire from the ensuing disaster damaged the fuselage. A memorial to the pilots killed in the crash was constructed and Amet-khan was buried in the Novodevichy Cemetery with full honours. His funeral was attended by a variety of famous people from the Soviet Union, ranging from members of the Crimean Tatar civil rights movement, veterans of the war, generals, and test pilots, including Vladimir Ilyushin, Aleksey Ryazanov, and Abdraim Reshidov.

=== Personal life ===
In the summer of 1944, while in Moscow training to fly the new La-7 fighter, he met a woman by the name of Faina Maksimovna Danilchenko. They later married in 1952. The couple had two children - Stanislav and Arslan, both of whom grew up to serve in the military. Both children's surnames were written down as Amet-khan. Faina was against her husband working as a test pilot due to the dangerous aspects of the job, but he refused to quit his job, even after being suggested to retire on his 50th birthday. Both Faina and Arslan died shortly after Amet-khan.

==== Involvement in politics ====
Amet-khan was one of the first people in the Soviet Union to publicly request the rehabilitation and right of return for the Crimean Tatars. Along with several other members of the Communist Party that had lived in Crimea, he signed a petition to the Central Committee of the Communist Party of the Soviet Union,. The request was rejected, even though Khrushchev had condemned the deportations and granted the full right of return to other deported nations, including the Chechens and Karachays in the 1950s. Amet-khan never lived to see the full right of return granted to the Crimean Tatars that occurred in the Perestroika era. In his later years, he met with many Crimean Tatar activists and leaders, including Yuri Osmanov, Zekie Chapchakchi, Ablyakim Gafarov, Safie Kosse, Seitmemet Tairov, and Mustafa Selimov in Moscow, as well as Ayshe Seitmuratova, Ilyas Mustafaev, and Mustafa Konsul in Samarkand.

== Memorials and commemorations ==
=== Memorials ===
A bronze bust in Amet-khan's likeness made by sculptor Mikhail Olenin was installed in Alupka in 1955. It was originally installed the Rostov Oblast, where Amet-khan flew in combat in 1943, despite the fact that Soviet law dictated that the bronze busts of double Heroes of the Soviet Union were supposed to be installed in their home village. The bust was moved to Alupka per his request after a conversation with Kliment Voroshilov. In 1974, a small bust of Amet-khan made by Sadri Akhun was added to his grave in Novodevichy Cemetery.

In 2010, a monument to Amet-khan's aerial ramming over Yaroslavl was installed on the ground below the site where he rammed the Ju 88. That same year, a bust in his likeness was added to the Walk of Glory in Kiev. Statues of Amet-khan are present throughout towns in Ukraine and Russia, including Alupka, Makhachkala, and the small village of Tsovkra in Dagestan. The city square of Simferopol bears his name, in addition to streets in Alupka, Sudak, Volgograd, Zhukovsky, Kaspiysk, Sakah, and Makhachkala. The aeroclub where he studied, a minor planet, an airport, several schools, and a peak in Dagestan were all named in his honour. In 2015, the Verkhovna Rada of Ukraine voted to rename Simferopol Airport in his honor; however, due to the Russian occupation of Crimea, this vote had more symbolic character.

Amet-khan was the main protagonist in the 2013 Crimean-Tatar movie Haytarma.

On October 26, 2020, a monument Amet-Khan Sultan was unveiled in the center of Aqmescit (Simferopol).

On December 22, 2022, in the city of Cherkasy, Komunalnyi Lane was renamed Amet Khan Sultana Lane.

Bust of Amet-khan on the street bearing his name in Alupka

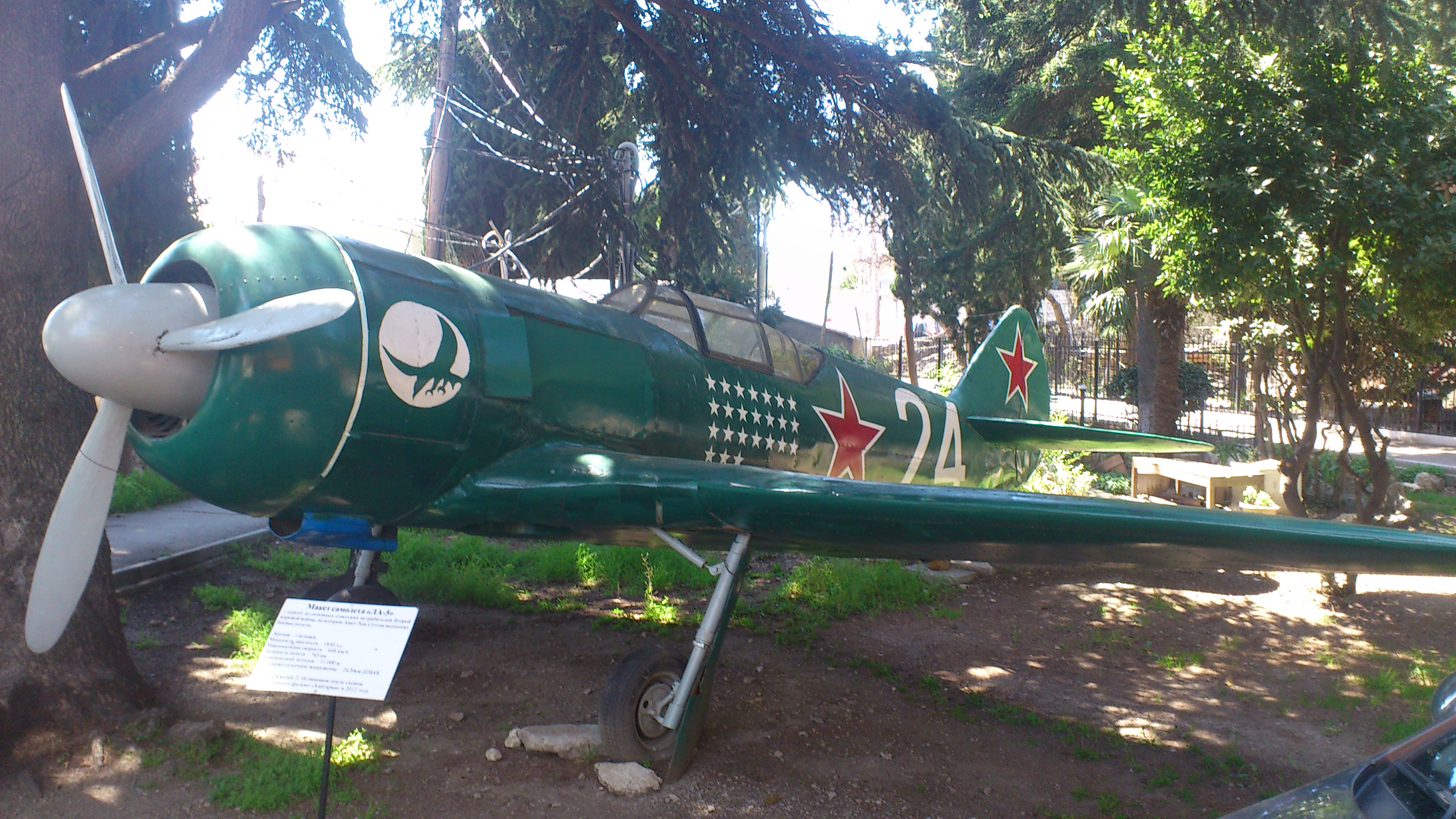
Replica of Amet-khan's La-5 with an eagle painted on it, located at the Amet-khan Sultan Museum in Alupka

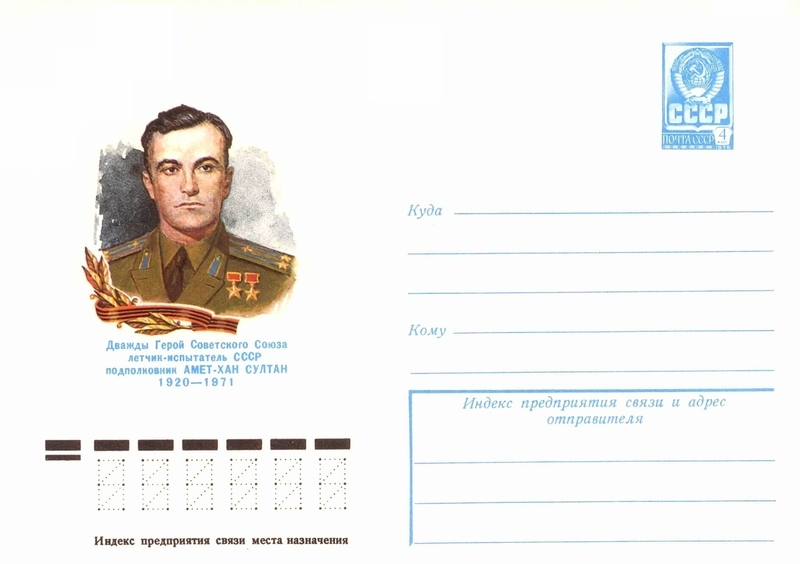
1978 postal cover of the USSR featuring Amet-khan

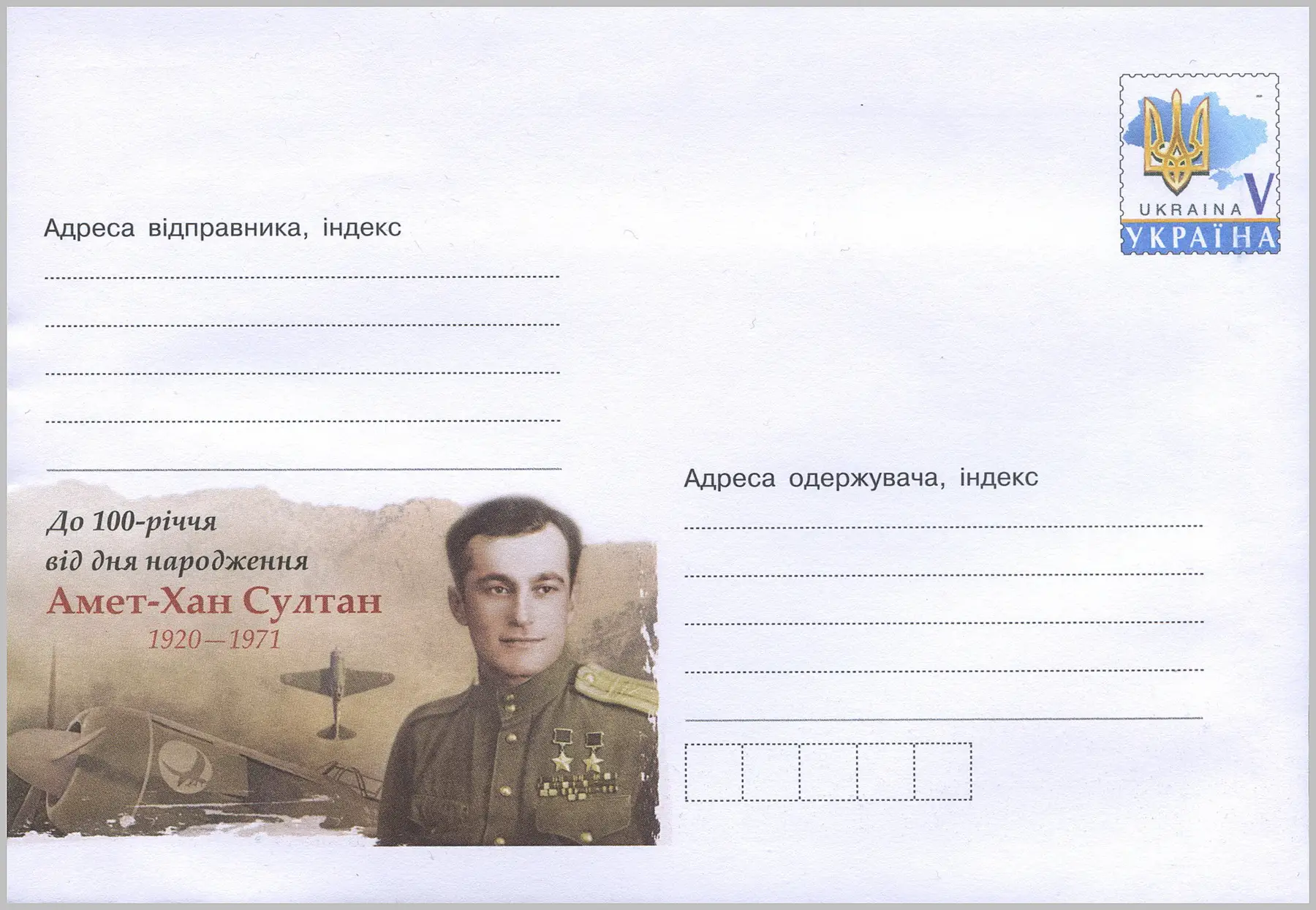
2020 postal cover of Ukraine featuring Amet-khan

=== Detatarization of Amet-khan Sultan's memory ===
Despite Amet-khan Sultan's iconic status as a Crimean Tatar hero, his participation in the Crimean Tatar rights movement, and the fact that he officially listed himself as Tatar and not Lak or Dagestani in all official documents, there have been many attempts to posthumously label him as a Dagestani and de-legitimize his Crimean Tatar identity. These actions are part of a systematic campaign of denial of Crimean Tatars by the Soviet Union and detatarization of Crimea. Obituaries of Amet-khan described him as a "courageous son of the Dagestani people", even though he had never claimed to be Dagestani during his life, and openly identified as Crimean Tatar. During his life, he was frequently told to change the nationality listing on his passport. Even in the face of constant pressure from Chekists and colleagues, he refused to dissociate himself from his Crimean origin, proudly saying, "I am a son of the Crimean Tatar people!" when asked about his national identity. In 2016, the Republic of Dagestan created the "Medal of Amet-khan Sultan". The Uytash Airport in Dagestan is named in his honor, despite repeated petitions from Crimean Tatar organizations to the Russian government that Simferopol Airport be named after him instead. Amet-khan was not born or raised in Dagestan and he did not speak any of the languages of Dagestan.

== Awards and honors ==
- Twice Hero of the Soviet Union (24 August 1943 and 29 June 1945)
- Honoured Test Pilot of the USSR (23 September 1961)
- Stalin Prize 2nd Class (3 February 1953)
- Three Orders of Lenin (23 October 1942, 14 February 1943, 24 August 1943)
- Four Orders of the Red Banner (31 July 1942, 13 October 1943, 20 April 1945, 3 February 1953)
- Order of Alexander Nevsky (13 October 1943)
- Order of the Patriotic War 1st class (20 January 1945)
- Order of the Red Star (5 November 1941)
- Order of the Badge of Honour (31 July 1961)
- campaign and jubilee medals

== See also ==
- List of World War II aces from the Soviet Union
- List of twice Heroes of the Soviet Union
- List of Crimean Tatars
