= Alexander Molodchy =

Soviet-Ukrainian long-range aviation pilot (1920–2002)

Alexander Ignatyevich Molodchy
- Russian: Александр Игнатьевич Молодчий; Ukrainian: Олександр Гнатович Молодчий
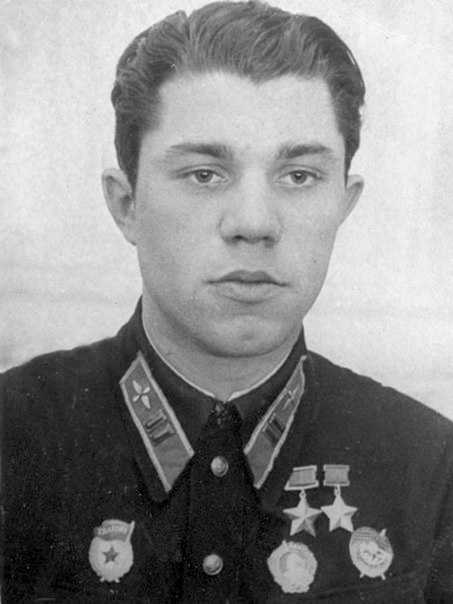
- Born: 27 June 1920; Luhansk, Ukrainian SSR
- Died: 9 June 2002 (aged 81); Vinnytsia, Ukraine
- Military career
- Allegiance: Soviet Union
- Branch: Soviet Air Force
- Service years: 1937–1965
- Rank: Lieutenant-General
- Conflicts: World War II
- Awards: Hero of the Soviet Union (twice)

Alexander Ignatyevich Molodchy (Russian: Александр Игнатьевич Молодчий, Ukrainian: Олександр Гнатович Молодчий; 27 June 1920 – 9 June 2002) was a Ukrainian Soviet long-range bomber pilot who flew over 300 missions on the B-25, Il-4, and Yer-2 during World War II, placing him among the top bomber pilots of the Soviet Union by number of sorties. He was the first person twice awarded the title Hero of the Soviet Union during the war while alive.

== Early life ==
Molodchy was born on 27 June 1920 in Luhansk to a large Ukrainian peasant family. After completing secondary school and training at the Voroshilovgrad aeroclub in 1935, he stayed at the aeroclub, where he worked at a workshop and as an instructor until entering the military as a junior lieutenant in 1937. When he was fifteen he won an aircraft modeling competition, and before becoming a member of the Communist Party in 1942 he was a member of the Komsomol.

After graduating from initial training at the Voroshilovgrad Military Aviation School of Pilots in November 1938, he trained to fly the Tupolev SB until November 1939; he then became a pilot in the 51st High-Speed Bomber Aviation Regiment, and in 1940 he was transferred to the 100th Long-Range Bomber Regiment.

== World War II ==
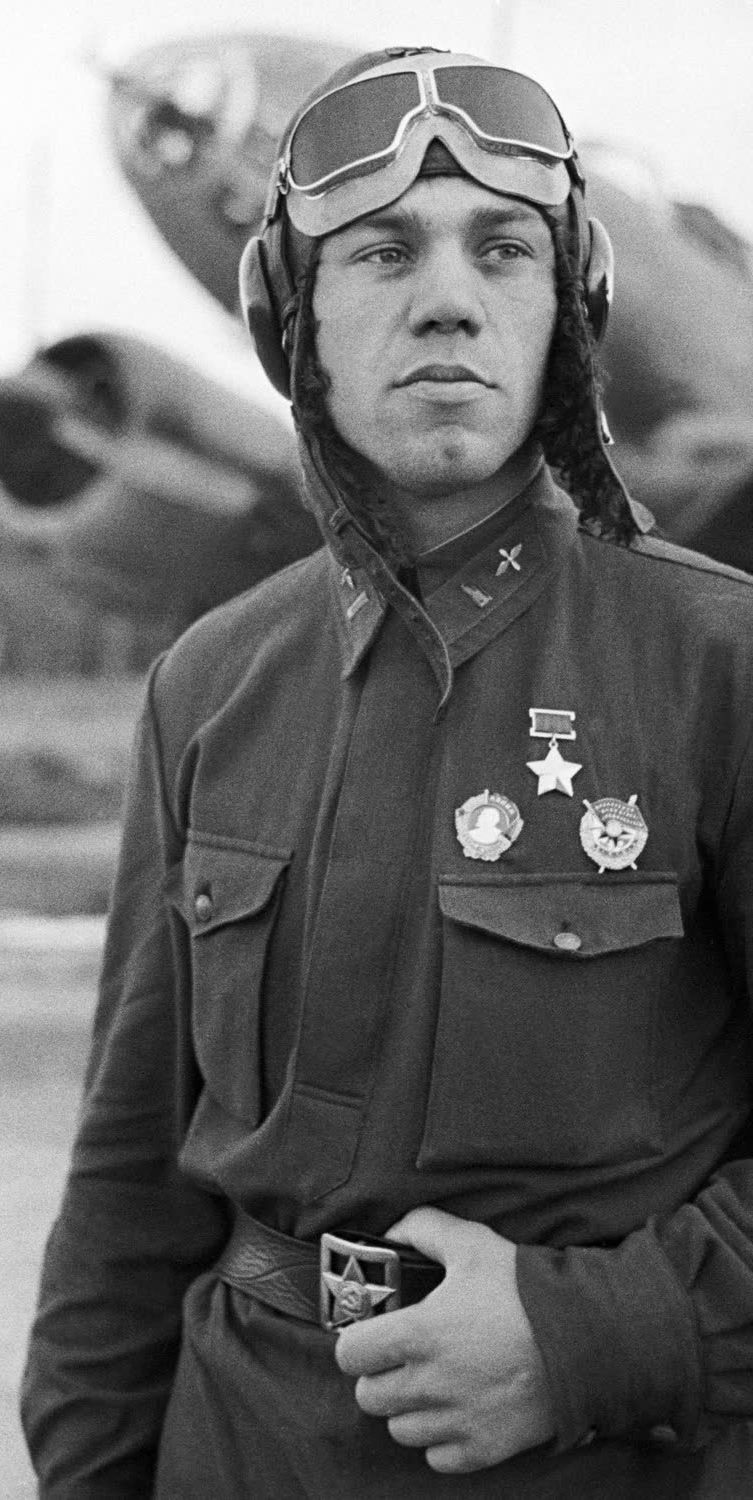
Molodchy in front of an Ilyushin Il-4, June 1942

When Germany invaded the Soviet Union in June 1941, Molodchy was a deputy squadron commander in the 420th Long-Range Bomber Regiment. Before entering combat in August he became one of the first Soviet pilots to become proficient in flying the Yer-2; for flying six daylight and seven night combat missions on it he was nominated for the title Hero of the Soviet Union on 20 October 1941, which was awarded two days later. From January 1942 to June 1944 he was a deputy squadron commander in the 748th Long-Range Aviation Regiment, which received the guards designation in the August of the same year and was renamed 2nd Guards Long-Range Aviation Regiment. After successfully bombing Berlin in an Il-4 on 26 August 1942 he received a congratulatory radiogram from Joseph Stalin. For most of his missions in the early years of the war he flew with Sergey Kulikov as his navigator.

Molodchy was nominated for a second gold star on 2 October 1942 for flying 145 missions, both bombing and reconnaissance flights. The awarding of the title on 31 December 1942 made him the first non-posthumous double awardee during the conflict. He was nominated for a third gold star in November 1943, but it was not awarded; in 1944 he was again nominated for a third gold star, but awarded the Order of Lenin instead.

In June 1944 Molodchy became a flight inspector for the 1st Guards Long-Range Aviation Division, so he did not fly any combat sorties from then until April 1945. While assigned as an inspector to the division he trained over 40 pilots. Once he was able to return to combat in April 1945, he flew four missions before the end of the war.

Throughout the war he flew 311 sorties, consisting of 24 daylight and 287 night missions on the Yer-2, Il-4, and B-25 over strategically-important cities in Europe including Berlin, Stalingrad, Kursk, Königsberg, Budapest, Vitebsk, Minsk, Vilnius, Riga, Smolensk, Oryol, and Polotsk. Despite being shot down twice, he survived the war, and his flight crew shot down five Axis fighters.

== Postwar ==
Molodchy remained as a flight inspector until September 1946 when he became the deputy commander of the 37th Guards Bomber Aviation Regiment. He went on to attend to Higher Officer Flight and Tactical School of Long-Range Aviation in Ivanovo, which he graduated from in 1948 before returning to his post at the 37th Bomber Regiment. In March 1949 he was promoted to commander of the 121st Guards Bomber Aviation Regiment, where he remained until December 1950. He was then made the deputy commander of the 22nd Guards Heavy Bomber Aviation Division, which he became commander of in December 1951, but was demoted to deputy commander in August 1953. In 1955 he was promoted to the rank major-general of aviation and made commander of the 106th Heavy Bomber Aviation Division. After graduating from the Military Academy of General Staff in November 1959 he was assigned to the 5th Long-Range Air Army, and in 1961 he took command of the 8th Separate Bomber Aviation Corps. In 1963 he made a flight to a polar icefield with a full load of bombs in a Myasishchev ZM. His military career began to decline after he sent a letter to Marshal Rodion Malinovsky expressing concern about the structure and organization of military long-range aviation. The letter was seen by Marshal Filipp Agaltsov, who already had a personal grudge against Molodchy; Agaltsov had become a marshal of aviation despite being a commissar and political worker, rather than a pilot. Shortly after storming out of a meeting with military officials in outrage, he was discharged into the reserve - supposedly for health reasons, even though he was only 44 years old at the time.

After leaving the military in 1965, he briefly worked as a manager of a fuel trust in Lugansk, but his strong will led to him getting into squabbles with high-ranking politicians in the region. In 1968 he moved to Chernigov; his health deteriorated over time and he suffered multiple heart attacks, and he became depressed after his gold star medals were stolen. To cheer him up, a Tu-95 made low-altitude flight over his house on his 70th birthday. He died in Vinnitsa on 9 June 2002 and was buried in the Yatsevo cemetery.

== Awards and honors ==
Soviet

- Twice Hero of the Soviet Union (22 October 1941 and 31 December 1942)
- Three Orders of Lenin (22 October 1941, 19 August 1944, and 4 June 1965)
- Two Order of the Red Banner (20 February 1942 and 29 April 1954)
- Order of Alexander Nevsky (13 July 1943)
- Order of the Patriotic War 1st class (11 March 1985)
- Order of the Red Star (3 March 1953)
- campaign, service, and jubilee medals

Foreign

- Ukraine - Order of Bohdan Khmelnytsky, 2nd and 3rd class (3rd class - 7 May 1995; 2nd class - 14 October 1999)
- Mongolian People's Republic - Order of the Red Banner (15 April 1943)
- Hungarian People's Republic - Order of the Red Star (4 April 1955)

== Monuments and memorials ==
A sculpture-portrait of him was made by sculptor Mikhail Olenin. A bronze bust of him made by sculptor Zair Azgur was installed in his hometown of Luhansk.

A Russian Air Force Tu-160 and a Ukrainian Air Force Tu-22M-3 were named in his honor.
