= Arkady Kovachevich =

Soviet flying ace (1919–2010)

- Native name: Аркадий Фёдорович Ковачевич
- Born: 3 May 1919; Chernogoriya, Novomyrhorod, RSFSR
- Died: 28 November 2010 (aged 91) Monino, Moscow oblast, Russian Federation
- Allegiance: Soviet Union
- Branch: Soviet Air Force
- Service years: 1937–1987
- Rank: General-lieutenant of Aviation
- Conflicts: World War II
- Awards: Hero of the Soviet Union

Arkady Fyodorovich Kovachevich (Russian: Аркадий Фёдорович Ковачевич; 3 May 1919 – 28 November 2010) was a Soviet flying ace and regimental commander during World War II who went on to become a general-lieutenant.

== Early life ==
Kovachevich was born on 3 May 1919 to a Ukrainian working-class family in Chernogoriya. Before being drafted into the Red Army in 1937 he attended technical school in Kirovgrad, where he trained an aeroclub. After graduating from the Odessa Military Aviation School of Pilots in 1938 he was assigned to the 27th Fighter Aviation Regiment; there he quickly mastered MiG-3 and received a promotion to flight commander.

== World War II ==
Immediately upon the German invasion of the Soviet Union, Kovachevich and the rest of his regiment began flying sorties to defend the Moscow region. On 11 October 1941 he shot down his first enemy aircraft, a Bf 109, after which he quickly increased his tally of aerial victories. Having participated in the battle for Moscow, he went on to fly the La-5 in the Battle for Stalingrad until being transferred to the 9th Guards Fighter Aviation Regiment as a squadron commander. By then he had already tallied thirteen solo aerial victories, for which he was nominated for the title Hero of the Soviet Union in February 1943, which he received on 1 May that year. He continued to fly in combat, and was wounded during a mission, but remained in the regiment and continued active service upon recovery. During the battle for Crimea he was promoted to assistant commander for flight training, and subsequently deputy regimental commander in April 1944. After the death of regimental commander Anatoly Morozov in June he was made acting commander, but held the position only briefly before being sent to study at the Air Force Academy and replaced by Vladimir Lavrinenkov. Throughout the course of the war he totaled 20 solo and 7 shared shootdowns accumulated over the course of roughly 520 sorties, piloting the MiG-3, La-5, Yak-1, and P-39 fighters.

== Postwar ==
After graduating from the air force academy with honors in 1948 he received another post as regimental commander, where he mastered piloting new fighter jets, but made his last flight in 1957. Having graduated from the Military Academy of General Staff in 1954 he was able to remain in the military for a while, serving as deputy chief of the Air Force Academy before retiring in 1987. He lived out the remainder of his life in Monino, where he died on 28 October 2010.

== Awards ==
- Hero of the Soviet Union (1 May 1943)
- Order of Lenin (1 May 1943)
- Order of the October Revolution (27 December 1982)
- Three Order of the Red Banner (31 July 1942, 26 August 1943, and 3 May 1944)
- Order of the Patriotic War 1st class (11 March 1985)
- Two Order of the Red Star (28 October 1941 and 2 November 1953)
- Order "For Service to the Homeland in the Armed Forces of the USSR" (22 February 1977)
- campaign and jubilee medals
