= Aleksandr Karasyov (pilot) =

- Native name: Александр Никитович Карасёв
- Born: 30 August [O.S. 17 August] 1916; Sunzhenskaya village, Terek Oblast, Russian Empire (present-day Vladikavkaz, Russia)
- Died: 14 March 1991 (aged 74) Chernihiv, Ukrainian SSR, USSR
- Allegiance: Soviet Union
- Branch: Soviet Air Force
- Service years: 1937–1968
- Rank: General-major of Aviation
- Conflicts: World War II; Korean War
- Awards: Hero of the Soviet Union

Aleksandr Nikitovich Karasyov (Russian: Александр Никитович Карасёв; 30 August 1916 – 14 March 1991) was a fighter pilot in the Soviet Air Force who became a flying ace in both [[[World War II]] and the Korean War, tallying 20 solo and two shared shootdowns in WWII and subsequently being credited with seven in Korea. Awarded the title Hero of the Soviet Union in the midst of World War II for his first 14 shootdowns, he later became a survivor of the infamous Mauthausen concentration camp, having been shot down and taken captive by the Nazis. After the camp was liberated and his eventual release from the Soviet prisoner of war filtration camp, he returned to flying, going on to become the first pilot in his regiment to gain an aerial victory in the Korean War. Having been promoted in October 1951 to a post that left him little time for combat sorties, he nevertheless credited as an ace in the war and was nominated for the title Hero of the Soviet Union for the second time, but it was downgraded to an additional Order of Lenin instead.

== Early life ==
Karasyov was born on 30 August 1916 to Russian family in what is now Vladikavkaz; his father was a bricklayer. After completing his seventh grade of school in 1932 he attended trade school, which he finished in 1934 before getting a job at a garment factory. Upon being drafted into the Red Army in 1937, he was originally assigned to the North Caucasian Military District where he served as an aircraft engine mechanic before being given the opportunity to study to become a pilot in April 1940. After graduating from the Nakhichevan Military Aviation School of Pilots in December that year, he went on to attend the Batay Military Aviation School of Pilots before being assigned to the 282nd Fighter Aviation Regiment, stationed in Kremenchug.

== World War II ==
Five days after the German invasion of the Soviet Union, Karasyov saw his first aerial combat, piloting an I-16 fighter at the time. Over the course of the next year he briefly served with various aviation units (specifically the 5th Separate Air Defense Squadron, 248th Fighter Aviation Regiment, and 164th Fighter Aviation Regiment) before eventually gaining his first aerial victory (a shared kill of a Do-215 bomber) while with the 6th Fighter Aviation Regiment during the Battle of Stalingrad in August 1942. Having distinguished himself as a skilled fighter pilot, he was subsequently sent to the prestigious 9th Guards Fighter Aviation Regiment the following month. Having started out as a pilot in the 1st squadron, then under the command of Aleksey Alelyukhin he rapidly increased his tally of aerial shootdowns, flying the Yak-1 and later the P-39 after unit received them in summer 1943. Earlier that year on 10 May 1943 he was nominated for the title Hero of the Soviet Union, having been a flight commander with 301 sorties, 14 solo and 9 nine shared shootdowns at the time. After being awarded the title on 23 August he went on to receive a promotion to captain and squadron commander in November after Alelyukhin was promoted to a higher command position in the unit. On 25 February 1944, the day he was promoted to major, he shot down his last enemy aircraft during the war, taking out a Bf 109 over Kherson. On 7 April 1944 during the battle for Crimea he was shot down after engaging five Messerschmitts, damaging two before his plane became engulfed in flames. Wounded and knocked unconscious from the incident, he was taken prisoner by the Nazis and detained first in Sevastopol Prison before enduring imprisonment in various other POW and concentration camps after several unsuccessful escape attempts. Eventually he was sent to Mauthausen, where after being liberated on 8 May 1945 he learned that his division was stationed nearby and requested to be sent there. Upon receiving his letter the 6th Guards Aviation Division sent a Po-2 flew to retrieve him. After passing through questioning in a filtration camp for officers that were held prisoner, in November 1945 he was reinstated into the air force and his medals returned to him. After returning to his wartime regiment in January 1946 he went on to master piloting new jet aircraft, and in January 1951 he received command of the 523rd Fighter Aviation Regiment.

== Korean War ==
At the time when Karasyov's regiment was deployed to China with the rest of the 303rd Fighter Aviation Division shortly before engaging in the Korean War, it was staffed with only three small squadrons instead of the usual four. While the regiment entered service on the Korean Peninsula in early June, it was not until the middle of the month that they began to experience intense aerial combats. On the morning of 18 June Karasyov claimed his first aerial victory during the war (an F-86) while leading a sortie with the third squadron. Later that month he gained his next victory, shooting down an F-80 in early morning on 24 June when he led over two dozen flight crews from his regiment in a mission to intercept enemy aircraft, during which they encountered four F-80s at an altitude of 2000 meters. Karasyov and his wingman went after the flight of F-80s, pursuing a pair as the flight scattered before Karasyov eventually opened fire at a distance of 450 meters away. The F-80 in question was probably No.49-646 of the 49th Fighter Bomber Group, which is listed as having been shot down by a MiG-15. While pilots from Karasov's regiment claimed to have shot down ten F-80 "shooting stars" that day, American records claim only five F-80 were shot down that day. For the next several months he commanded the regiment through the period of some of its most intense battles, but did not claim any additional shootdowns until 19 September. That day, in what became his most memorable sortie, he participated in an intense ten-minute dogfight in which Soviet pilots claimed to shoot down six enemy aircraft, three of which were credited to Karasyov; both Americans and Soviets only reported one loss of their aircraft each after the battle, but the one confirmed American loss (of F-84E No 51-528) is attributable to Karasyov. On 26 September he added another shootdown to his tally, most likely the F-84E No.50-1152 of Lieutenant Paul Ross, who ejected out of the plane over the sea and was rescued by a US Navy flying boat. Before moving on to a promotion to deputy commander of flight training of the 303rd Fighter Aviation Division, he went on to claim a final aerial victory during sortie on 27 October. In that battle he flew out with several squadrons to defend the Ansyu-Junsen area from an impending American bombing raid. After he spotted eight B-29 bombers and their accompanying escort fighters, he went in to attack the leading B-29, opening fire when 1000 meters away for the first pass and then another pass at it before moving on to a bomber on the left. Over the course of the battle, 14 of the Soviet pilots opened fire of the American aircraft, claiming the shootdown of two B-29 and two F-84 aircraft as the result, although American reports indicate the loss of only one F-84 and one B-29; because Dmitry Samoylov is also credited with shooting down a B-29 in the battle, but it is unclear if the B-29 that went down, No 44-62971 was on the account of Karasyov or Samoylov. After having left the 523rd Fighter Aviation Regiment for a leadership position in the division, he occasionally went on combat sorties, but did not claim any additional victories before returning to the Soviet Union in February 1952. Despite being nominated for a second Hero of the Soviet Union medal for his feats in the Korean War by the command of the 64th Fighter Aviation Corps, he did not receive it, as the nomination was downgraded to an Order of Lenin in Moscow.

== Later life ==
Upon returning to the USSR in 1952 he was appointed commander of the 303rd Fighter Aviation Division. Eventually in February 1958 he was promoted to the rank of major-general, and in September 1959 he graduated from the Military Academy of General Staff. He then briefly served as head of the Voroshilovgrad Military Aviation School of Pilots, but after it closed in December 1960 he transferred to the Chernigov Military Aviation School of Pilots, where he served first as chief of staff and later deputy chief of the school until retiring from the military in August 1968. He lived in Chernigov, where he died on 14 March 1991 and was buried in the Yatsevo cemetery.

== Awards ==
- Hero of the Soviet Union (24 August 1943)
- Three Order of Lenin (1 April 1943, 24 August 1943, 22 April 1952)
- Four Order of the Red Banner (23 September 1942, 22 July 1943, 1 August 1943, 10 October 1951)
- Order of the Patriotic War 1st class (11 March 1985)
- Order of the Red Star (30 December 1956)
- Medal "For Battle Merit" (24 June 1948)
- campaign and jubilee medals
