= Arseny Vorozheykin =

Squadron commander in the Soviet Air Force

Arseny Vasilyevich Vorozheykin
- Арсе́ний Васи́льевич Вороже́йкин
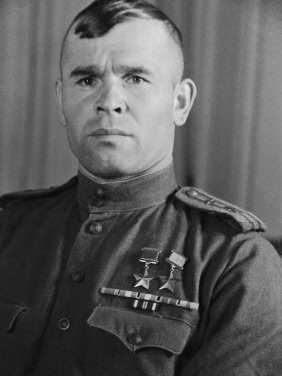
- Born: October 28 (O.S. 15) 1912; Prokofievo Village, Gorodetsky District, Nizhny Novgorod Governorate, Russian Empire
- Died: 23 May 2001 (aged 88); Moscow, Russian Federation
- Military career
- Allegiance: Soviet Union
- Branch: Soviet Air Force
- Service years: 1931 – 1933; 1934 – 1957
- Rank: General-Major
- Conflicts: Battles of Khalkhin Gol; World War II; Winter War; Eastern Front
- Awards: Hero of the Soviet Union (twice)

Arseny Vasilyevich Vorozheykin (Russian: Арсе́ний Васи́льевич Вороже́йкин; October 28 (O.S. 15) 1912 – 23 May 2001) was a squadron commander in the Soviet Air Force and fighter ace during the Second World War. He was twice awarded the USSR's highest honor, Hero of the Soviet Union, and went on to become a Major-General of Aviation.

== Early life ==
Vorozheikin was born on 15 October 1912 in the village of Prokofyevo to a Russian peasant family. He completed his secondary education while living in the city of Gorodets before entering the military in 1931.

== Military career ==
Vorozheykin entered the Red Army in 1931. He was initially assigned to the 17th Rifle Division, where he was sent to the town of Gorky. After being transferred to the reserve, he entered the Higher Communist Agricultural School in Gorky, but he graduated only from the first course before he reentered the military in 1934. In 1937 he graduated from the Kharkov Military Aviation School of Pilots. From November 1937 to July 1938 he served as a junior pilot in the 53rd Bomber Regiment. He was then sent for training to become a squadron commissar, and in January 1939 he graduated from the six-month course of pilot commissars, after which he returned to the 53rd Bomber Aviation Regiment as a squadron commissar.

In May 1939 transferred to the 22nd Fighter Aviation Regiment, where he continued to serve as a squadron commissar. There, he participated in the battles on the Khalkhin Gol River from May to September 1939. While in Mongolia he flew approximately 100 sorties on the I-16 fighter, during which he shot down one Ki-27 by himself and gained twelve shared aerial victories.

When he was withdrawn from the fighting in Khalkhin Gol, he was a squadron commissar in the 56th Fighter Aviation Regiment. Due to the start of the Soviet-Finnish War he was transferred to the 38th Fighter Aviation Regiment, which he served in from February to March 1940. He completed a few sorties flying the I-153 during the war.

From May 1940 until July 1941 he was assigned to the 84th Fighter Aviation Regiment. Initially a deputy squadron commander, he became a squadron commander before he was transferred to the 348th Fighter Aviation Regiment, which was based in Yerevan and equipped with the I-153.

=== World War II ===
In August 1942 he graduated from the Air Force Academy in Chaklov. The next month he arrived at the warfront at a deputy squadron commander in the 728th Fighter Aviation Regiment; he was later promoted to the position of squadron commander. There, he fought on the Kalinin Front until March 1943, the Voronezh Front from July to October, and the 1st Ukrainian Front from October until July 1944. He participated in the battles for Kursk, the Dnepr, Kiev, Belgorod, Kharkov, Lutsk, and many other European cities.

On 1 May 1945, Vorozheykin led a group of pilots from the 2nd Air Army in victory flight over the defeated Reichstag, during which they dropped red banners tied to parachutes. One of the banners had “Victory” written on one side, with “Glory to the Soviet soldiers who hoisted the Victory Banner over Berlin” on the back side, and another banner contained the text “Long live May 1”.

Throughout his combat record he completed 250 sorties, gaining 46 solo and 13 shared shootdowns; one of the solo and twelve of the team aerial victories happened during the Battle of Khalkin Gol, and the rest were on the Eastern front of World War II. For his victories in the war he was awarded the title Hero of the Soviet Union on 4 February 1944 and 19 August 1944.

== Postwar life ==
Since October 1945 Vorozheykin commanded the 9th Guards Fighter Aviation Regiment in the 128th Fighter Air Division. From December 1947 until November 1950 he was the Senior Inspector of the Directorate of Combat Training of Fighter Aircraft of the Soviet Air Force. He graduated from the Higher Military Academy named after K.E.Voroshilov in 1952. From March 1953 he commanded the 108th Fighter Aviation Division in the 76th Air Army of the Leningrad Military District.

In August 1953, his division was transferred from the Soviet Army to the Black Sea Fleet of the Soviet Navy. He was promoted to the rank General-Major on 31 May 1954. In March 1955 he became the assistant commander of the air force of the 4th fleet. In March 1956 he became the senior deputy commander of the air defense in the Black Sea Fleet. He retired due to illness in 1957, after which he lived in Moscow. He died on 23 May 2001 and was buried in the Troekurovsky cemetery.

== Awards and honors ==
- Twice Hero of the Soviet Union (4 February 1944 and 19 August 1944)
- Order of Lenin (1944)
- Four Orders of the Red Banner (1939, 1943, 1947, and 1953)
- Order of Suvorov 3rd class (1944)
- Order of Alexander Nevsky (1943)
- Order of the Patriotic War 1st class (1985)
- Two Orders of the Red Star (1947 and 1955)
- Distinguished Flying Cross (1945)
- Order of the Red Banner of Mongolia (1939)

The city of Gorodets has a street named in his honor and a bronze statue of him.
