= Sadri Akhun =

Soviet sculptor

- Садри Салахович Ахун; Садретдин Сәлахетдин улы Ахунов
- Born: 1903; Russian Empire (Note: Different sources indicate different places of birth, with some indicating he was born in Yekaterinburg, some say Moscow, and others say Laishevsky Uyezd)
- Died: 1987 or 1990; Moscow, USSR
- Citizenship: Russian Empire, Soviet Union
- Occupation: sculptor
- Awards: Order of the Red Banner of Labour

Sadri Salakhovich Akhun (Russian: Садри Салахович Ахун, Tatar: Садретдин Сәлахетдин улы Ахунов; 16 March 1903 — 21 June 1990) was a Soviet sculptor, often considered to be considered the founder of sculpture of Tatarstan. He received many honors including the honorary titles Honored Artist of the RSFSR, People's Artist of the Tatar Autonomous Soviet Socialist Republic, and Honored Artist of the Tatar Autonomous Soviet Socialist Republic.

== Biography ==
Akhun was born in 1903 to a Volga Tatar family in the Russian Empire. He attended the Sverdlovsk Art and Industry Institute and attended the Institute of Proletarian Fine Arts in Leningrad from 1927 until he graduated in 1931. He became a member of the Artists' Union of the USSR in 1936. From 1940 to 1950 he was the chairman of the Union of Artists of the Tatar ASSR.

His works were displayed at many exhibitions not only in the Tatar ASSR but throughout the Soviet Union. His artworks include the decorative fountain "Labor will be the ruler of the world" in Kazan, a monument to the famous Tatar poet Ğabdulla Tuqay that he worked on with Lev Kerbel, a portrait-bust of Musa Jalil in 1957, and a sculpture of flying ace Amet-khan Sultan that was installed on his grave in Novodevichy Cemetery in 1947.

He died in 1987, or according to other sources, 1990.
