= Ivan Grigorevich Borisov =

Hero of the Soviet Union (1921–1954)

- Иван Григорьевич Борисов
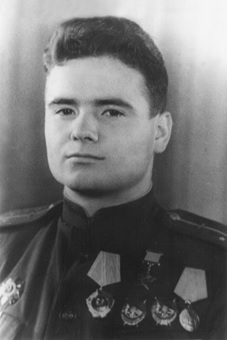
- Born: 28 September 1921; Shelukhino village, Moscow Governorate, RSFSR (present-day Lukhovitsky District, Moscow Oblast)
- Died: 10 August 1954 (aged 32); Moscow, USSR
- Military career
- Allegiance: Soviet Union
- Branch: Soviet Air Force
- Service years: 1940–1949
- Rank: Major
- Unit: 9th Guards Fighter Aviation Regiment
- Conflicts: World War II
- Awards: Hero of the Soviet Union

Ivan Grigorevich Borisov (Russian: Иван Григорьевич Борисов; 28 September 1921 – 10 August 1954) was a pilot in the Soviet Air Force who became a flying ace and served as the wingman to Amet-khan Sultan while in the prestigious 9th Guards Fighter Aviation Regiment during the Second World War.

== Early life ==
Borisov was born on 28 September 1921 in the village of Shelukhino in the Moscow area to a Russian family. After completing seven grades of school in 1937 he started working at a local tool factory. He graduated from the Moscow Oktyabrsky flight club in 1939, and from May to December 1940 he attended the Chkalov Central Aeroclub in Tushino, after which he entered the Soviet military.

== Military career ==
Upon entering the military in December 1940 Borisov trained at the Ostafyevsky school of pilots until early summer 1941 when the German invasion of the Soviet Union began; he was immediately deployed to the front as a sergeant in the 309th Fighter Aviation Regiment, which was an air-defense regiment assigned to protecting Moscow. From August to October 1942 he fought in the Battle of Stalingrad while in the 4th Fighter Aviation Regiment. For having shot down three enemy aircraft by Autumn 1942 he was awarded the Order of the Red Banner. In October he was reassigned to the 9th Guards Fighter Aviation Regiment as a flight commander, which he served in for the remainder of the war. He flew his first sorties in the regiment flying as a wingman to Vladimir Lavrinenkov; he then flew under the command of Amet-khan Sultan until he was promoted to the rank of captain and made commander of the second squadron in 1944. During the war he became a flying ace and was awarded the title Hero of the Soviet Union on 1 November 1943 for scoring ten individual and eight shared victories. By the end of the war he flew 554 sorties; sources differ on his final tally of victories. Historian Mikhail Bykov credits him with 22 individual and 8 shared kills, while George Mellinger credits him with 14 individual and 9 shared kills.

== Postwar ==
Borisov remained in the Soviet Airforces until 1949. He died in 1954 and was buried in the Vagankovo Cemetery.

== Awards ==
- Hero of the Soviet Union
- Five Orders of the Red Banner
- Order of Alexander Nevsky
- Order of the Patriotic War 1st class
