= Isaak Mendelevich =

- Исаак Абрамович Менделевич
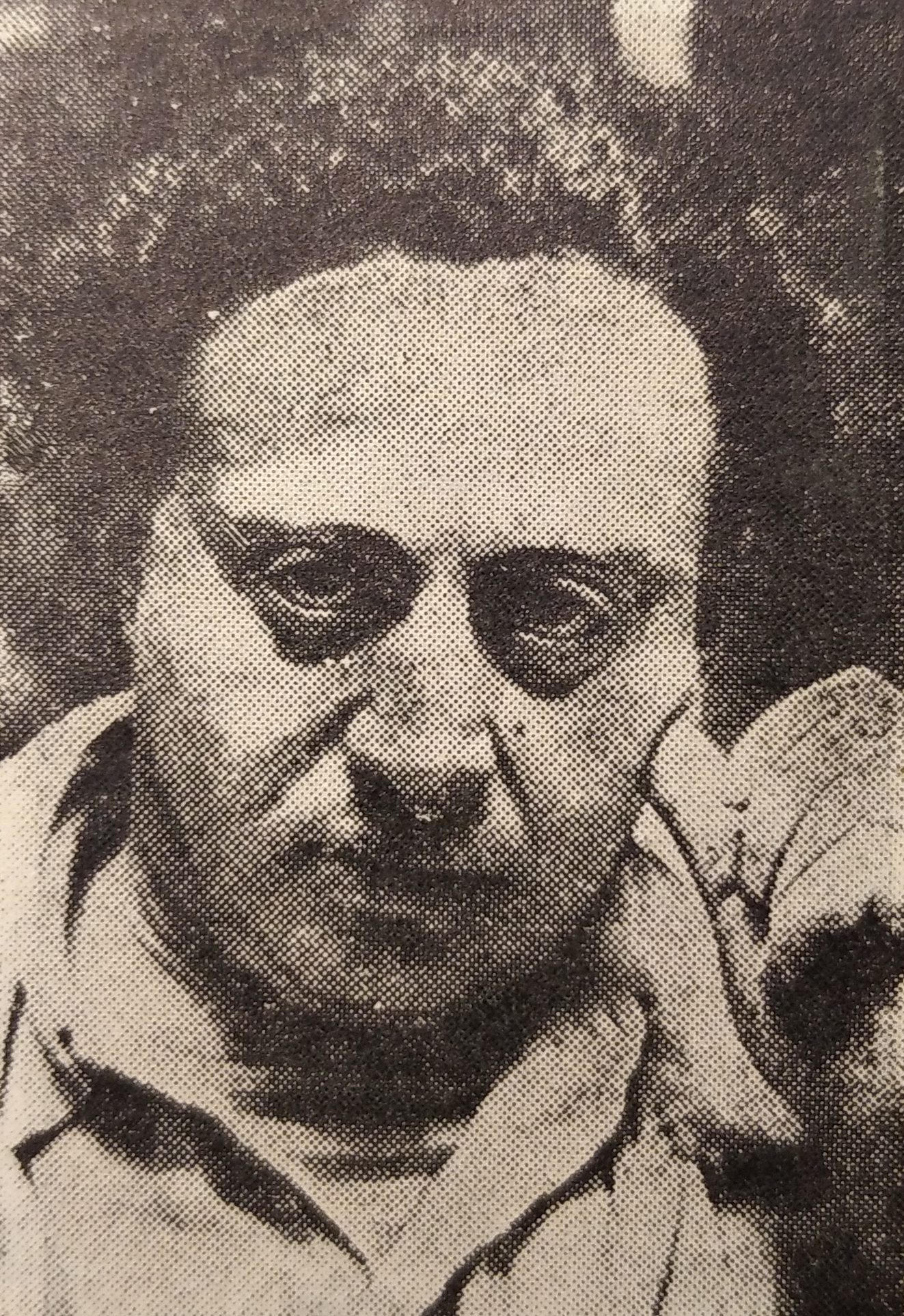
- Born: 28 November [O.S. 16 November] 1887; Moscow, Russian Empire
- Died: 9 September 1952; Moscow, USSR
- Citizenship: Russian Empire, Soviet Union
- Occupation: sculptor
- Awards: Stalin Prize

Isaak Abramovich Mendelevich (Russian: Исаак Абрамович Менделевич; 28 November [O.S. 16 November] 1887 – 9 September 1952) was a Soviet realist sculptor who made many statues of famous Soviet politicians, artists, and military figures.

== Biography ==
Mendelevich was born on 28 November [O.S. 16 November] 1887 to a Jewish family in Moscow. In Russia, he studied under the famous sculptors Konstantin Krakht and Anna Golubkina. He then went to Paris to study sculpting from 1909 to 1911. He returned to Moscow in 1911.

He was a member of the Association of Artists of Revolutionary Russia. After the October Revolution he participated in the project for development of Soviet sculpture art and worked on a sculpture of Victor Hugo.

He made sculptures depicting many famous people of the Soviet Union, including Vladimir Lenin, Mikhail Frunze, Yakov Sverdlov, Alexander Pushkin, Maxim Gorky, Sergo Ordzhonikidze, Mikhail Lermontov, Sergey Chaplygin, Vladimir Nemirovich-Danchenko, Mikhail Tarkhanov, Akaki Khorava, Ivan Moskvin, Prov Sadovsky, Valery Chkalov, Mikhail Gromov, and Vladimir Lavrinenkov.

He was awarded the Stalin Prize in 1942 for his statue of Hero of the Soviet Union pilot Valery Chkalov.

He died in Moscow on 9 September 1952.
