= Emir Çalbaş =

Crimean Tatar fighter pilot

- Crimean Tatar: Emir Üsein Çalbaş; Russian: Эмир Усеин Чалбаш (Note: In some documents found by aviation historian Mikhail Bykov, his name is listed as Ivan Kirrilovich Chalbash instead of Emir Usein. Many other Crimean Tatars in the Soviet military, including Leonid/Nasibulla Velilayev and Anatoly/Fetislyam Abilov would pseudonyms consisting of Slavic given names and patronymics.)
- Born: 5 January 1918; Yuqarı Şuma, Crimean People's Republic
- Died: 6 August 2005 (aged 87); Alushta, Crimea, Ukraine
- Military career
- Allegiance: Soviet Union
- Branch: Soviet Air Force
- Service years: 1939 – 1959
- Rank: Colonel
- Units: 627th Mixed Aviation Regiment; 49th Fighter Aviation Regiment
- Conflicts: World War II
- Awards: Order of the Red Banner (2); Order of Bohdan Khmelnytsky 3rd class

Emir Üsein Çalbaş (Russian: Эмир Усеин Чалбаш, romanized: Emir Usein Chalbash; 5 January 1918 – 6 August 2005) was a Crimean Tatar flying ace, squadron commander, test pilot, and friend of Amet-khan Sultan. He was nominated to receive the title Hero of the Soviet Union on two occasions but did not receive it.

== Early life ==
Born to an impoverished Crimean Tatar family in early 1918, from an early age he had to help out his family by working in agriculture and delivering milk cans to the city of Alushta, a 6-kilometer walk. He excelled in primary school, completing a program intended to last two years. He studied at a boarding school for seven years after completing four grades at a local school. During a famine in 1933 he briefly dropped out of school to work as a cook, but after his teacher chided him for leaving he returned to school. He then went to a transportation school in Simferopol, and after that he worked on navy ships as an electrician. There he developed his desire to become a pilot, since he often got to observe military aircraft in flight. After meeting the famous test pilot Vladimir Kokkinaki in 1937, who told him to enter the Kerch aeroclub with a Komsomol ticket, he pursued his aviation career. Having taken Kokkinaki's advice, he entered the Kech aeroclub in 1938, which he graduated from in 1939. He then went on to attend the Kacha Military Aviation School of Pilots, where he met future twice Hero of the Soviet Union Amet-khan Sultan. In March 1940, Çalbaş became a flight instructor at the school.

== World War II ==
Due to the German invasion of the Soviet Union, the Kacha School of Pilots had to be relocated to Saratov oblast in 1941. At the start of the war Çalbaş and several of his fellow flight instructors requested to be sent to the frontlines, where he was sent in December 1941. He flew in combat with the 627th Mixed Aviation Regiment until February 1943, using the I-16 and LaGG-33. He gained his first aerial victory on 31 January 1942, a shared shootdown of a Ju 88. His first solo shootdown took place over a year later on 6 May 1943, taking out an Fw 190. The first award he received was the campaign medal for the defense of Moscow, but before the end of the year he received the Order of the Red Star; at the time of the award he was a deputy squadron commander in the 627th Regiment, but in February 1943 he was transferred to 49th Fighter Aviation Regiment. In that regiment he gained the majority of his aerial victories, but was recalled from the front in September to train pilots at the Lyubertsy Higher Aviation School in Moscow. By then he had become a squadron commander and was promoted to captain, and wounded twice in combat. While in Moscow he flew in May Day parades in 1944 and 1945.

Aviation historian Mikhail Bykov indicates his final aerial victory tally consisting of eight solo plus four shared shootdowns accumulated throughout 316 sorties; however, some sources indicate that he had as many as eleven solo and six shared victories.

== Postwar and personal life ==
Having been spared the brunt of repression due to his friendship with Vasily Stalin, Çalbaş continued his career in the air force. Initially after the war given a choice of becoming a regimental commander in Germany or a deputy regimental commander in the Russian Far East. He chose to go to the Russian Far East, where he rose to the rank of colonel and eventually commanded a fighter-interceptor regiment. He accumulated over 3000 flight hours, but he was forbidden from flying for medical reasons in 1959, so he retired from the military. After retiring he tried to return to his homeland Crimea many times; under Soviet law retired military personnel had the right to move back to the place where they enlisted and get a household registration, but this did not apply to Crimean Tatars, who had restricted movement under the special settlement regime and were rarely allowed to enter Crimea even after the abolition of the special settler status. Even though Çalbaş was exempted from special settler status, he was still not allowed a propiska to live in Crimea until the Crimean Tatars received the full right of return despite applying four times during the Brezhnev era. After moving to Crimea only in 1992 he found it incredibly difficult to find housing, and did not get an apartment in his native Alushta until ten years later; he died shortly thereafter on 6 August 2005 and was buried in the ally of heroes. His brother Khalil was a decorated officer in the Red Army. His son followed in his footsteps by becoming also pilot, but received as fatal dose of radiation in his duties flying a helicopter over Chernobyl while working as a liquidator for the disaster.

== Awards ==
- Two Order of the Red Banner (16 April 1942 and 16 October 1957)
- Order of Aleksandr Nevsky (12 August 1943)
- Two Order of the Patriotic War 2nd class (29 May 1943 and 11 March 1985)
- Three Order of the Red Star (10 December 1942, 30 April 1954, and 22 February 1955)
- Medal "For Battle Merit" (20 June 1949)
- Order of Bohdan Khmelnytsky 3rd class (14 October 1999)
- campaign and jubilee medals
