= Pavel Babaylov =

Soviet aviator (1919–1944)

Pavel Konstantinovich Babaylov
- Павел Константинович Бабайлов
- Born: 25 February 1919; Neustroyevo, Sverdlovsk Oblast
- Died: 14 October 1944 (aged 25); Rostka-Strudne, Nazi-occupied Poland
- Military career
- Allegiance: Soviet Union
- Branch: Soviet Air Force
- Service years: 1940–1944
- Rank: Captain
- Unit: 790th Fighter Aviation Regiment
- Awards: Hero of the Soviet Union

Pavel Babaylov (Russian: Павел Константинович Бабайлов; 25 February 1919 – 14 October 1944) was a Soviet aviator who was posthumously awarded the title Hero of the Soviet Union for his aerial combat feats as part of the 790th Fighter Aviation Regiment. He was born in a peasant family of Russian ethnicity in Neustroyevo, Sverdlovsk Oblast on 25 February 1919. He joined the Red Army as a volunteer in January 1940 and fought in the Winter War. In 1941 he was transferred to the Soviet Air Force. He became a member of the Communist Party in 1944 and was killed in action on 14 October 1944. On 23 February 1945, he was posthumously awarded the title of Hero of the Soviet Union.

== Awards ==
- Hero of the Soviet Union
- Order of Lenin (February 23, 1945)
- 3 Orders of the Red Banner (October 19, 1942; April 5, 1943; April 15, 1944)
- Order of Alexander Nevsky (July 12, 1944)
- Order of the Patriotic War 1st Class (February 21, 1943)
- campaign medals
