= Pavel Golovachev =

Soviet flying ace (1917–1972)

Pavel Yakovlevich Golovachev
- Павел Якаўлевіч Галавачоў
- Born: 15 December [O.S. 2 December] 1917; Koshelovo village, Rogachev Uezd, Mogilev Governorate
- Died: 2 July 1972 (aged 54); Minsk, Byelorussian SSR, Soviet Union
- Military career
- Allegiance: Soviet Union
- Branch: Soviet Air Forces
- Service years: 1940 – 1972
- Rank: General-Major of Aviation
- Unit: 9th Guards Fighter Aviation Regiment
- Conflicts: World War II
- Awards: Hero of the Soviet Union (twice)

Pavel Yakovlevich Golovachev (Belarusian: Павел Якаўлевіч Галавачоў, romanized: Paviel Yakaulievich Halavachou; Russian: Павел Яковлевич Головачёв; 15 December [O.S. 2 December] 1917 – 2 July 1972) was a fighter pilot with the 9th Guards Fighter Aviation Regiment of the Soviet Air Forces during the Second World War who was twice awarded the title Hero of the Soviet Union. He is credited with gaining at least 30 aerial victories.

== Early life ==
Golobachev was born on 15 December [O.S. 2 December] 1917 to a Belarusian peasant family in the village of Koshelovo, currently located within the Gomel oblast of present-day Belarus. During his childhood his family lived in the Vietka district, where his father worked as a forester before they moved to Chachersk district. After completing six grades of school in 1933 he entered trade school, which he graduated from in 1935 and subsequently began working at a timber processing plant. Having graduated from the Gomel aeroclub in 1938, he went on to enter the military, training at the Odessa Military Aviation School of Pilots, which he graduated from in 1940 at the end of 1940. He was then assigned to the 168th Fighter Aviation Regiment based in Crimea.

== World War II ==
During the start of the German invasion of the Soviet Union, Golovachev was stationed in Iași. Initially he flew ground-attack missions on the Polikarpov I-16, but in October he was transferred to the 69th Fighter Aviation Regiment, which was renamed the 9th Guards Fighter Aviation Regiment in March 1942. During a mission in the summer that year he was hospitalized for with shrapnel wounds after managing to make a belly landing when his plane was heavily damaged during mission; a group of four Bf 109s had engaged Golovachev and his wingman, shooting out the glass from his cockpit and instrument panel. Before his plane was hit Golovachev did manage to shoot down one of the attackers, but while returning to base he realized that the undercarriage was damaged too. Surgeons were unable to remove five remaining pieces of shrapnel. Not long after returning to combat, he was hospitalized again after crashing into the Don River on 23 August; after shooting down a Ju 88, he was hit by enemy cannon fire and lost consciousness. His LaGG-33 went into a spin. He managed to get the aircraft back into level flight after waking up, but the tail of the plane soon fell off resulting in him crashing into the river. When he was released from the hospital he was retrained to fly the Yak-1 and was assigned as a flight commander in the 3rd squadron, commanded by flying ace Amet-khan Sultan. As a lieutenant in Amet-khan's squadron, Golovachev quickly increased his tally of aerial victories and participated in successful dogfights against German aircraft even when heavily outnumbered. In 1943 he became a member of the Communist Party. In November that year he was awarded the title Hero of the Soviet Union for shooting down 17 enemy aircraft. By then he had participated in 92 dogfights and flown 225 sorties. In summer 1944 he was promoted to the rank of captain and made the deputy squadron commander.

Golovachev performed an aerial ramming on 30 December 1944 during the fighting for East Prussia after running out of ammunition while trying to shoot down a Ju 188 on a reconnaissance mission. After ramming the Junkers his damaged plane entered a steep dive, but he managed to bring his plane back to the airfield. For the successful ramming attack he was awarded the Order of the Red Banner.

In February he became the commander of the first squadron; he scored his last two aerial victories upon shooting down two Fw 190 on 25 April 1945. By the end of the war he had accumulated 31 personal aerial victories, one group victory, flew 457 sorties and engaged in 125 aerial battles. He was awarded the title Hero of the Soviet Union a second time on 29 June 1945.

== Later life ==
Golovachev remained in the Air Force after the end of the war. In 1951 he graduated from the Red Banner Air Force Academy, and in 1959 he graduated from the Military Academy of General Staff. He went on to hold senior command positions in the Soviet Air Force, and became a General-Major of Aviation in 1957. He died in 1972 in Belarus and was buried in the East Minsk Cemetery.

== Awards and honors ==
- Twice Hero of the Soviet Union (1 November 1943 and 29 June 1945)
- Two Orders of Lenin (1 November 1943 and 4 June 1955)
- Six Orders of the Red Banner (30 August 1942, 1 August 1943, 5 January 1945, 24 January 1945, 22 February 1955, and 22 February 1968)
- Order of the Patriotic War 1st class (26 April 1943)
- Two Orders of the Red Star (29 April 1954 and 30 December 1956)
- campaign and jubilee medals
