= Vasily Pavlov (test pilot) =

Soviet test pilot (1916–2017)

Vasily Georgievich Pavlov
- Native name: Василий Георгиевич Павлов
- Born: 18 April 1916; Belousovo, Moscow Governorate, Russian Empire
- Died: 6 December 2017 (aged 101) Moscow, Russia
- Allegiance: USSR
- Branch: Soviet Air Forces
- Service years: 1938–1946; 1952–1977
- Rank: Colonel
- Conflicts: Battles of Khalkhin Gol; Winter War; World War II
- Awards: Hero of the Soviet Union; Honoured Test Pilot of the USSR

Vasily Georgievich Pavlov (Russian: Василий Георгиевич Павлов; 18 April 1916 – 6 December 2017) was a Soviet pilot and colonel. In 1953 for this work as a test pilot, he was awarded the title Hero of the Soviet Union, in 1964 he was awarded the title Honoured Test Pilot of the USSR, and was a laureate of the Stalin Prize 2nd class in 1953.

== Biography ==
Pavlov was born on 18 April 1916 in the village of Belousovo (now in Naro-Fominsky District, Moscow Oblast). In 1933 he completed seven years of secondary school and then graduated from the technical college of the Moscow Theatrical Enterprises Administration.

From 1931 he worked as a makeup artist at the Moscow Art Theatre for six years. In 1937 he graduated from the Sverdlovsky District Aeroclub in Moscow. He joined the Workers’ and Peasants’ Red Army in November 1937. In 1938 he graduated from the Borisoglebsk Military Aviation School of Pilots and served in combat units of the Transbaikal Military District Air Force.

Pavlov took part in the Battles of Khalkhin Gol with the 22nd Fighter Aviation Regiment, flying 35 combat sorties in an I-15 and shooting down one enemy aircraft personally. During the Winter War (1939–1940), he was a flight commander in the 149th Fighter Aviation Regiment, flying 19 sorties in an I-153 and downing one enemy aircraft.

From June 1941, Pavlov fought on the Eastern Front as flight commander and deputy squadron commander of the 149th Fighter Aviation Regiment. He participated in the defence of southern Ukraine, Donbass, and Rostov-on-Don. He flew 229 combat sorties on the I-153, MiG-3, and LaGG-3, shooting down two enemy aircraft solo and five more in group combat. In 1942 he completed air-gunnery training courses. From 1944 to 1946 he served as deputy commander for air-gunnery of the 26th Reserve Aviation Regiment. He retired as a major in March 1946.

After leaving active duty, Pavlov commanded the glider detachment at the Central Aeroclub named after Chkalov until 1948. In 1950 he completed test-pilot courses and returned to the Air Force in 1952 as a test pilot with KB-1 at NPO Almaz, testing autopilots and guidance systems for cruise missiles. Between 1951 and 1952 he, along with Sergey Anokhin and Fyodor Burtsev, tested the manned analogue of the KS “Kometa-3” aircraft-missile.

By decree of the Presidium of the Supreme Soviet on 3 February 1953, for “courage and heroism displayed in testing new aviation technology,” he was awarded the title Hero of the Soviet Union.

From 1964 to 1970 he served as a test pilot at the Research Institute of the Ministry of Radio Industry, conducting radar equipment trials aboard Il-18, Il-28, MiG-17, MiG-19, Tu-104, Tu-124, and Yak-25 aircraft. He retired as a colonel in April 1970 and worked as a lead engineer at TsKB Almaz until 1982.

== Later life and death ==
Pavlov lived in Moscow after retirement. He died on 6 December 2017 at the age of 101 and was, at the time, the oldest living Hero of the Soviet Union.

== Awards, titles and prizes ==
- Hero of the Soviet Union (2 March 1953)
  - Medal “Gold Star” No. 10866
- Order of Lenin (2 March 1953)
- Three Order of the Red Banner (17 November 1939, 5 November 1941, and 20 April 1956)
- Order of the Patriotic War I class (11 March 1985)
- Order of the Patriotic War II class (18 August 1945))
- Two Order of the Red Star (20 September 1947 and 31 July 1948)
- Badge “Participant of the Battles of Khalkhin Gol”
- Medals, including foreign awards
- Honoured Test Pilot of the USSR (21 August 1964)
- Stalin Prize II class (1953) – “for outstanding inventions and fundamental improvements of production methods” (1953)
