= Mikhail Baranov =

Soviet flying ace (1921–1943)

- Born: 21 October 1921; Gornye, near Leningrad, Russian SFSR
- Died: 15 January 1943 (aged 21)
- Military career
- Allegiance: Soviet Union
- Branch: Soviet Air Force
- Service years: 1939–1943
- Rank: Senior Lieutenant
- Unit: 9th Guards Fighter Aviation Regiment
- Conflicts: World War II; Battle of Stalingrad
- Awards: Hero of the Soviet Union

Mikhail Dmitrievich Baranov (Russian: Михаил Дмитриевич Баранов; 21 October 1921 – 15 January 1943) was a Soviet fighter pilot, who during the early stages of the Battle of Stalingrad became the leading Soviet ace of 1942 with around 23 solo aerial victories. (Note: Sources slightly differ on the exact breakdown of Baranov's tally of aerial victories. Most sources indicate between 21-24 solo victories and no more than a few shared victories if any at all.) He died in an accident on 15 January 1943 while testing a Yak-1 fighter.

== Early life ==
Baranov was born on 21 October 1921 in the small town of Gronye, in the Leningrad Oblast. After finishing the 9th year of school in 1937, he went to work at the Kirov factory in Leningrad. Simultaneously Baranov joined the DOSAAF, and participated in Leningrad's central aeroclub.

In October 1938 Baranov graduated as a pilot, with distinction, and was encouraged by the aeroclub's authorities to pursue a career as a military airman. Baranov attended the Military School of Chugevkaya, where he graduated in October 1940 with the rank of Mladshiy Leytenant. Initially assigned to serve in the 271st Fighter Regiment (Baltic Military District), he was later sent to the 183rd Fighter Regiment in Southern Ukraine.

== World War II ==
=== First victories ===
Flying a Yakovlev Yak-1 fighter, Baranov claimed his two first victories on 22 and 28 September (Messerschmitt Bf 109s), but no actual German losses match those claims. On 30 October 1941, he intercepted a Henschel Hs 126 on an artillery correction mission escorted by a quartet of Messerschmitt Bf 109s. Baranov shot down both the Henschels and a Bf 109. Later that same day, he shot down a Junkers Ju 88 whose crew was captured. Luftwaffe records confirm 40% damage on Hs 126 B-1 W.Nr. 3457 of 3.(H)/32, and the loss of Bf 109F-4 W.Nr.5288 of Oberleutant Walter Höckner (Staffelkapitän of 6./JG 77, an experte with 68 victories), and Ju 88A-5 W.Nr. 4037 of 1./KG 77

On 8 November 1941, Baranov again shot down two aircraft: a Henschel and one of the escorting Bf 109s. Shortly afterwards, Baranov was shot down by five Bf 109s and fell, wounded, behind enemy lines. In spite of a broken leg, he evaded German troops and reached Soviet lines. Recovered from his wounds, Baranov added a Ju 88 and a Hs 126 to his score on 24 December 1941 and 17 February 1942 respectively.

=== Battle of Stalingrad ===
Baranov's unit, the 183rd Fighter Regiment of the 269th Air Division, was part of the 8th Air Army. In mid July 1942 the 8th Air Army faced the brunt of the assault of Luftflotte 4 supporting the drive of the German 6th Army towards Stalingrad across the Don bend.

Among Baranov's daily adversaries were experienced elite fighter units like JG 3, II./JG 52 and I./JG 53, and the Ju 87s of StG 2. On 22 July Baranov claimed a Bf 109, his first victory during the Battle of Stalingrad, followed by a second Messerschmitt two days later. On 25 July 1942 the commander of Luftflotte 4, Wolfram von Richthofen, sent the Stukas of I. and II./StG 2, escorted by Italian Macchi C.200 fighters, to suppress Soviet strongholds along the Chir river. Baranov's 183rd Regiment intercepted them. In the ensuing dogfight, Baranov shot down a Stuka and a Macchi C.200 - probably the Ju 87D-3 of Staffelkapitän of 4./StG 2) and the Macchi of Sottotenente Gino Lionello (21 Gruppo Caccia). Both airmen were injured. Two days later, Baranov claimed three more victories, two Messerschmitt fighters and a Stuka, followed by a third Ju 87 on 4 August, and two Bf 109s on the 5th. At that time his score stood at 21.

=== Aerial battle on 6 August 1942 ===
At dawn on 6 August 1942 three Yak-1s of 183rd Fighter Aviation Regiment took off to escort Il-2s of the 504th Ground Attack Regiment, bombing targets near Abganerovo. Those aircraft were flown by Baranov and his two wingmen. Almost reaching the target, they encountered two dozen Stukas escorted by four Messerschmitts. Baranov made a head-on attack, shooting down one of the Bf 109s. While his wingmen engaged the remaining German fighters, Baranov pursued the Ju 87s and downed one (the crew was captured), and forced the others to drop their ordnance prematurely. Baranov and his wingmen returned with the Il-2s in time to engage another group of Bf 109s. Baranov shot down two of them, but ran out of ammunition, ramming a third Bf 109. He was wounded in the leg.

Two of his victims that day can be corroborated - the Ju 87 of 4./StG 2, whose pilot was taken prisoner, and a Bf 109 of 3./JG 53. Other German losses match Baranov's claims, but the Luftwaffe reported them as accidental or downed by anti-aircraft fire.

Baranov not only was a prominent ace, but also a capable leader, inspiring the men of the 183 Regiment to score some 35 victories from 1 July to 8 August 1942. The remaining four regiments of the 269 Air Division (6th, 148th, 254th and 864th) scored 32 in total. The 183rd Regiment, however, lost 12 Yak-1s (the whole division lost 47 Yaks and LaGGs).

On 12 August, Baranov received the title of Hero of the Soviet Union and the Order of Lenin. Now a national hero, he made several propaganda tours to front-line aerodromes, training schools and factories to boost morale.

== Death ==
By late 1942 Baranov had recovered from his wound and was allowed to return to combat duties. He was picked by regimental commander Lev Shestakov to be a member of his all-ace unit, the 9th Guards Fighter Regiment. On 15 January 1943, while testing a new Yak-1 recently arrived from the factory, he suffered a technical problem and had to perform an emergency landing. He requested permission to fly another Yak-1 and while performing aerobatic figures at 3,000 meters, his aircraft rolled inverted and plunged to the ground, killing him. The cause was unknown.
