= Boris Kovzan =

Soviet fighter pilot (1922–1985)

Boris Ivanovich Kovzan
- Борис Иванович Ковзан
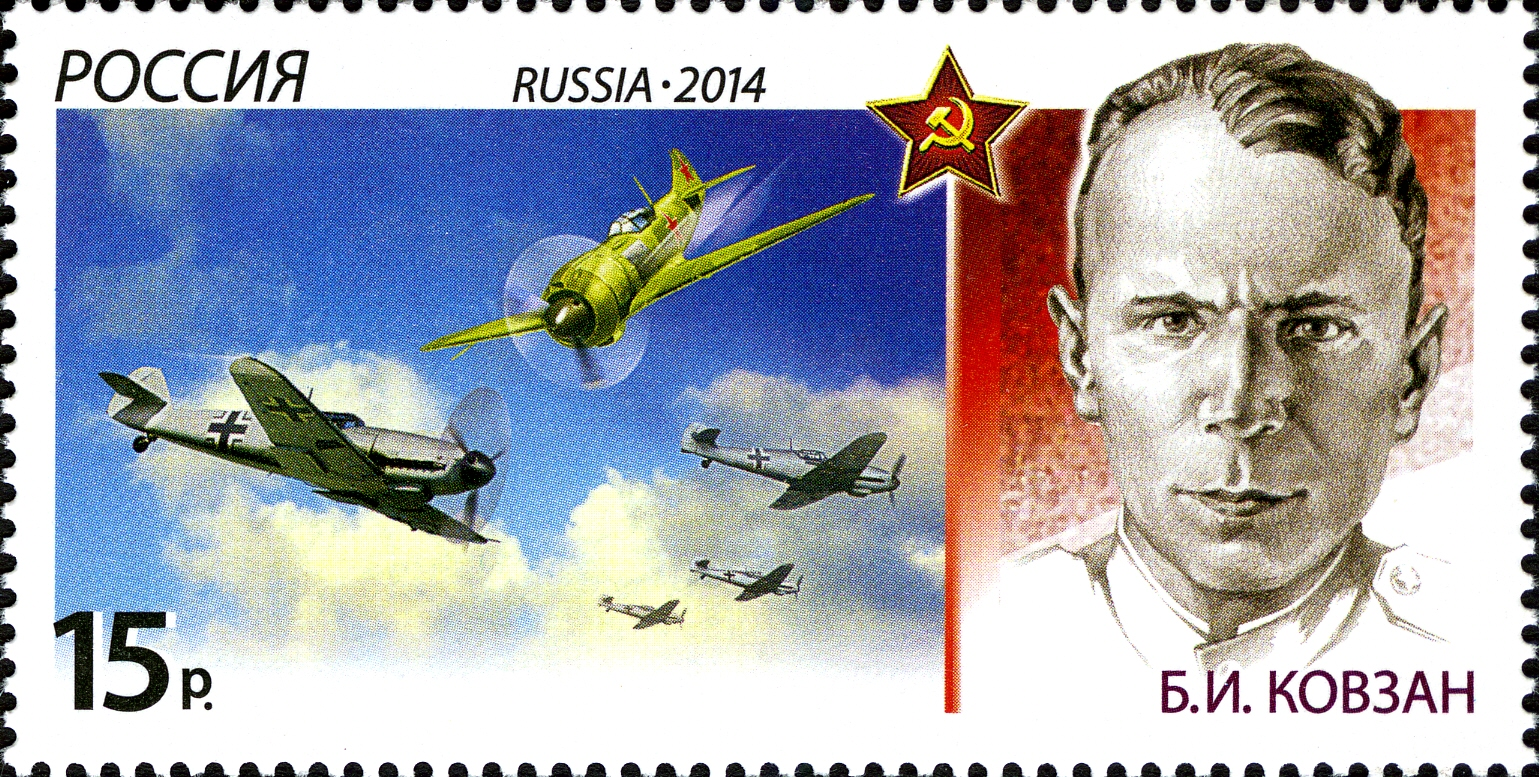
- 2014 postage stamp of Russia depicting Kovzan and one of his ramming attacks
- Born: 7 April 1922; Shakhty, Ukrainian SSR
- Died: 31 August 1985 (aged 63); Minsk, Byelorussian SSR, Soviet Union
- Military career
- Allegiance: Soviet Union
- Branch: Soviet Air Force
- Service years: 1939 – 1958
- Rank: Polkovnik (Colonel)
- Conflicts: World War II; Eastern Front
- Awards: Hero of the Soviet Union; Order of Lenin (2); Order of the Red Banner; Order of the Patriotic War; Medal "For Battle Merit"

Boris Ivanovich Kovzan (Russian: Борис Иванович Ковзан; 7 April 1922 – 31 August 1985) was a Soviet fighter pilot and the only person to have executed four confirmed aerial rammings, referred to as taran attacks in the Soviet Union.

== Early life ==
Kovzan was born in 1922 to a working-class family in Shakhty. After graduating from secondary school in Babruysk, Belarus he enlisted in the Red Army in 1939 and attended the Odessa Military Aviation School in Ukraine. In 1940 he was assigned to the 160th Fighter Aviation Regiment of the Belarusian Special Military District.

== World War II ==
Shortly after the German invasion of the Soviet Union in 1941, Kovzan was deployed to the front. On 29 October 1941, he conducted his first aerial ramming as a junior lieutenant in the 42nd Fighter Aviation Regiment over Zagorsk. He rammed a German Messerschmitt Bf 110 heavy fighter that was conducting a reconnaissance mission over Soviet-controlled territory while flying a MiG-3 interceptor. That day, he had used up all he ammunition to shoot down a Messerschmitt Bf 109 from a group of four and was forced to return to the airfield. While approaching the airfield he was based at, he noticed the reconnaissance plane and rammed it upward at an altitude of 5,000 metres (16,000 ft). Ramming enemy aircraft upward was an unusual technique, but Kovzan is not the only person to use it; notable pilots such as Amet-khan Sultan later used the technique. After the attack, Kovzan was able to land. Before this ramming, he had shot down a Dornier Do 215 light bomber in August 1941.

Kovzan's second aerial ramming took place over Torzhok on 21 February 1942. He rammed a Junkers Ju 88 while flying a Yak-1 and again managed to land his damaged plane at an airfield.

On 9 July 1942, he rammed an approaching Messerschmitt Bf 110 over the village of Lyubtsy in the Novgorod Oblast; again he managed to safely land his damaged Yak-1. After that attack, he was nominated for the title Hero of the Soviet Union, but the leadership of the 6th Air Army rejected the nomination and awarded him an Order of the Red Banner instead.

His fourth and final ramming attack took place over Staraya Russa on 13 August 1942 when he rammed a Ju 88 whilst flying an La-5. While flying a patrol in the area he noticed a group of seven Junkers Ju 88s and six Messerschmitt Bf 110s. Before he could approach the group, the Germans spotted his fighter and attacked. Knowing that his one plane would be no match for the group of bombers and ignoring additional escort fighters, he rushed at several of the Junkers aircraft, hoping to take out as many as possible before he ended up in the line of fire of an Bf 109. After an Bf 109 shot at Kovzan's plane, one of the rounds entered his cockpit and hit him in his right eye. He then tried to bail out of his plane, but found he did not have enough strength to do so, so he flew head-on into a Ju 88. The impact created an opening in the plane from which he could get out, and he proceeded to fall 6,000 metres (20,000 ft) and landed in a marsh on a collective farm, fracturing his leg, arm, and multiple ribs. Workers on the farm pulled an unconscious Kovzan out of the swamp and took him to a partisan detachment, which then took him to a hospital in Moscow, where he eventually regained consciousness.

On 24 August 1943 Kovzan was officially declared a Hero of the Soviet Union by decree of the Supreme Soviet for his perseverance despite grave injuries. After spending ten months in the hospital recovering from his wounds, he was released and returned to the Soviet Airforce, initially as a flight instructor, but later as the deputy regimental commander of the 144th Fighter Regiment.

By some accounts, Kovzan amassed 28 aerial victories during the war, four by ramming, although most modern historians have found such claims questionable, and hence he is not included in the encyclopedia of Soviet flying aces by Mikhail Bykov.

== Later life ==
After the end of the Second World War Kovzan remained in the air force and held a variety of positions; initially he was the deputy commander of the 123rd Fighter Aviation Defense Division before graduating from the Air Force Academy in 1954, after which he headed the DOSAAF aeroclub in Ryazan. In 1958 he left the air force with the rank of Polkovnik and transferred to the reserve, but continued to work as head of the Ryazan aeroclub until he moved to Minsk in 1969. He died on 30 August 1985 at the age of 63 and was buried in the Minsk Northern Cemetery.

== See also ==
- Ivan Drachenko
- Aleksei Khlobystov
