= Sergey Lugansky =

Soviet flying ace (1918–1977)

Sergey Danilovich Lugansky
- Сергей Данилович Луганский
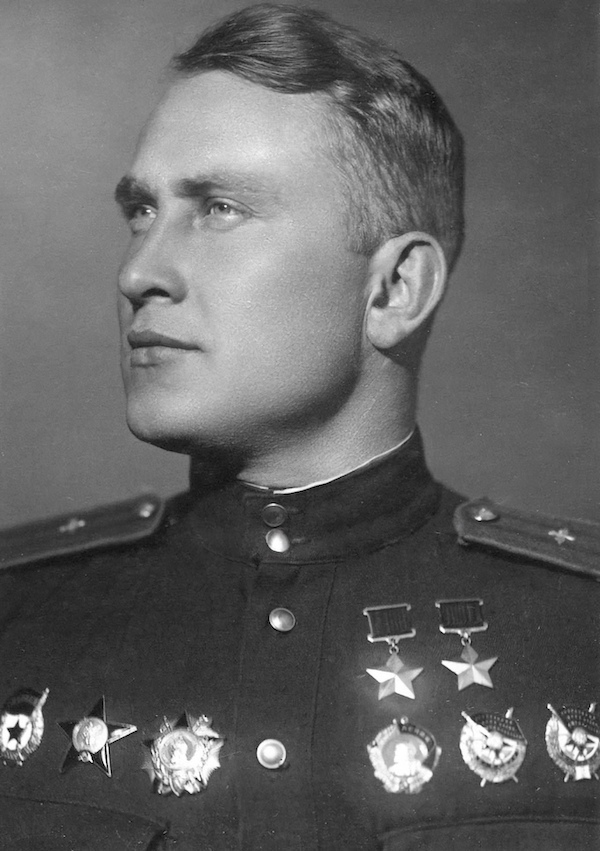
- Born: 1 October 1918; Verny, Turkestan ASSR
- Died: 16 January 1977 (aged 58); Alma-Ata, Kazakh SSR, USSR
- Spouse: Mariya Arkadyevna
- Military career
- Allegiance: Soviet Union
- Branch: Soviet Air Force
- Service years: 1936 – 1964
- Rank: General-major of Aviation
- Unit: 270th Fighter Aviation Regiment
- Conflicts: World War II; Winter War; Eastern Front
- Awards: Hero of the Soviet Union (twice)

Sergey Danilovich Lugansky (Russian: Сергей Данилович Луганский; 1 October 1918 – 16 January 1977) was a flying ace in the Soviet Air Forces during the Second World War who was twice awarded the title Hero of the Soviet Union for having gained at least 34 solo shootdowns during the war. A resident of the Kazakh SSR, he was close friends with Talgat Bigeldinov.

== Early life ==
Lugansky was born on 1 October 1918 to a Russian peasant family in the town of Verniy in the Turkestan ASSR (present-day Almaty, Kazakhstan). He entered the Red Army in 1936 after completing eight grades of secondary school that year. In December 1938, he graduated from the Orenburg Military Aviation School of Pilots, after which he was assigned to the 49th Fighter Aviation Regiment; the unit was equipped with I-15 and I-153 fighters. From November 1939 to March 1940, he flew 59 sorties on the I-153 as part of the Winter War. In May 1941, he was made a deputy squadron commander in the 271st Fighter Aviation Regiment, where he initially flew the I-16 fighter.

== World War II ==
Lugansky was deployed to the front of World War II in October 1941. From then until May 1942, he remained in his position as a deputy squadron commander in the 271st Fighter Aviation Regiment; there scored two aerial victories and participated in the fighting over Rostov before he was transferred to the 270th Fighter Aviation Regiment as a squadron commander. While he scored only one aerial victory in 1942, the next year he increased his victory tally significantly after switching from flying the LaGG-3 to the Yak-1, mostly in Summer 1943. Later, he was presented with a custom-painted Yak-1, a gift from the city of Alma-ata that was raised money for the construction of the aircraft.

In 1944, Lugansky's regiment received a delegation of American pilots. A colonel from the delegation offered to engage in a training duel, and Lugansky accepted the offer. The American piloted a P-63, which Lugansky successful managed to tail for the duration of the flight from his Yak-1. On 4 June 1944, the commander the 270th Fighter Aviation Regiment was shot down by anti-aircraft fire over enemy territory; Lugansky was chosen as his replacement. That month, the unit was honoured with the Guards designation and renamed the 152nd Guards Fighter Aviation Regiment. Under his command, the unit participated in the Lvov-Sandomierz and Silesian Offensives. In March 1945, on the orders of Marshal of the Soviet Union, Ivan Konev, he was sent the Air Force Academy in Moscow, forcing him to relinquish command of the regiment. By the end of the war, he had flown 390 sorties, and gained at least 34 solo aerial victories as well as at least one shared shootdown. (Note: Official documents from the course of the war available at present indicate Lugansky had accumulated 34 solo victories and one team victory, but other sources indicate he had 36 solo and two group shootdowns. British historian George Mellinger credits him with conducting one aerial ramming, and some sources even credit him with two rammings, but no Soviet documents contain any mention of an aerial ramming by Lugansky.) For his high number of aerial victories, he was awarded the title Hero of the Soviet Union on 2 September 1943 and 1 July 1944.

== Post-war ==
After the end of the Second World War, Lugansky remained at the Air Force Academy, which he graduated from in 1949. He commanded the 42nd Fighter Aviation Division from May 1952 until March 1956, in which he flew MiG-15 and MiG-17 fighters. From March 1956 to March 1957, he was the commander of the 37th Fighter Aviation Division, in which he flew MiG-17 and MiG-17PF fighters. From then until July 1960, he was the commander of the 72nd Guards Fighter Aviation Corps; he was promoted to the rank of General-Major of Aviation on 28 May 1957. He became the deputy commander of the 11th Air Defence Corps in 1960, a position a he remained in until he retired in December 1964. In addition to his command posts in the military, he was a deputy in the Supreme Soviet of the Turkmen SSR from 1959 to 1964. For the remainder of his life he lived in Alma-ata. After suffering a severe stroke in November 1968, he became paralyzed on his right side, rendering him unable to speak, walk, and drive. Before regaining the ability to speak, he would communicate with nodding; his condition improved somewhat over time and he eventually managed to walk and speak, but he died of a second stroke in January 1977, less than a year after his wife Mariya died. His friend Talgat Bigeldinov was greatly saddened by his death.

== Awards and honors ==
- Twice Hero of the Soviet Union (2 September 1943 and 1 July 1944)
- Order of Lenin (2 September 1943)
- Two Orders of the Red Banner (23 February 1942 and 22 July 1943)
- Orders of Aleksandr Nevsky (5 September 1944)
- Two Orders of the Red Star (19 May 1940 and 19 November 1951)
- campaign and service medals

== See also ==
- List of twice Heroes of the Soviet Union
- List of World War II aces from the Soviet Union
