= 9th Guards Fighter Aviation Regiment =

- Country: Soviet Union
- Branch: Soviet Air Force
- Engagements: World War II; Battle of Stalingrad; Operation Bagration; Vitebsk–Orsha Offensive; Minsk Offensive; Vilnius Offensive; Gumbinnen Operation; East Prussian Offensive; Heiligenbeil Pocket; Battle of Königsberg; Samland Offensive; Battle of Berlin
- Decorations: Guards designation Order of the Red Banner; Order of Suvorov

Commanders
- Regimental Commander: Lev Shestakov (until Aug 1943); Anatoly Morozov (Aug 1943 – June 1944); Arkady Kovachevich (June 1944 – Sept 1944); Vladimir Lavrinenkov (Sept 1944 – Aug 1945)

Aircraft flown
- Fighter: Yakovlev Yak-1; Bell P-39 Airacobra; Lavochkin La-7

The 9th "Odessa" Guards Fighter Aviation Regiment was a "regiment of aces" unit in the Soviet Air Forces created to assist the USSR in gaining air supremacy over the Luftwaffe during the Second World War.

== Second World War ==
Pilots admitted to the regiment were either already aces or considered potential aces by their commanders. Throughout the war the regiment operated various aircraft, including the Polikarpov I-16, LaGG-3, Yak-1, Bell P-39 Airacobra, and Lavochkin La-7. Prior to being designated as the 9th Guards Regiment in 1942, the unit was the known as the 69th Fighter Aviation Regiment and equipped with I-16 and MiG-3 fighters, having been formed in 1939. With 558 enemy aircraft destroyed by the unit during World War II, it was the 7th highest scoring regiment in the Soviet Air Forces.

== Name ==
Before the regiment was honored with the Guards designation in 1942 it was known as the 69th Fighter Aviation Regiment. Later the regiment was given the honorific "Odessa" in 1943, and by the end of the war its full name was the 9th Guards Odessa Red Banner Order of Suvorov Fighter Aviation Regiment. After the capitulation of Nazi Germany, the regiment saw action in the Korean War before it was incorporated into the Air Force of Uzbekistan as the 62nd Fighter Aviation Regiment in 1992 after the dissolution of the Soviet Union.

== Notable members ==
=== Twice Heroes of the Soviet Union ===
- Aleksey Alelyukhin
- Amet-khan Sultan
- Pavel Golovachev
- Vladimir Lavrinenkov

=== Heroes of the Soviet Union ===
- Mikhail Astashkin
- Mikhail Baranov
- Georgy Baykov
- Ivan Borisov
- Aleksey Cherevatenko
- Yevgeny Dranishchev
- Aleksandr Karasyov
- Arkady Kovachevich
- Ivan Korolev
- Georgy Kumzin
- Semyon Kunitsa
- Lydia Litvyak
- Aleksey Malanov
- Anatoly Morozov
- Yuri Rykachev
- Ivan Serzhantov
- Vasily Serogodsky
- Lev Shestakov
- Mikhail Shilov
- Mikhail Tvelenev
- Vitaly Topolsky
- Sergey Yelizarov
- Agey Yelokhin

=== Hero of the Russian Federation ===
- Yekaterina Budanova
