= Lev Shestakov =

Flying ace

Lev Lvovich Shestakov
- Native name: Лев Львович Шестаков
- Born: 28 December 1915; Avdiivka, Russian Empire
- Died: 13 March 1944 (aged 28) Davydkivtsi, Ukrainian SSR, USSR
- Allegiance: Soviet Union
- Branch: Soviet Air Force
- Service years: 1934 – 1944
- Rank: Colonel
- Commands: 9th Guards Fighter Aviation Regiment
- Conflicts: Spanish Civil War; World War II
- Awards: Hero of the Soviet Union

Lev Lvovich Shestakov (Russian: Лев Львович Шестаков; 28 December 1915 – 13 March 1944) was a Soviet flying ace who participated in Spanish Civil War and later World War II.

== Career ==
Upon graduating from military college in 1936 he applied for combat in Spain, joining a Spanish Republican Air Force fighter squadron in 1937. Flying Polikarpov I-16s he claimed two solo plus one shared aerial victory over the span of 36 sorties.

Shestakov joined 69th Fighter Aviation Regiment in September 1939, and was at the time one of the most famous Soviet aces.

At the time of the German invasion of the Soviet Union in June 1941, Shestakov was serving with 69th Fighter Aviation Regiment on the Odessa front, and became the Regiment Leader on 16 July 1941. During the battle for Odessa, 69th Fighter Aviation Regiment pilots achieved 94 air victories. The losses inflicted on the Romanian Air Force above Odessa in 1941 by Shestakov's fighter pilots compelled the Romanian High Command to withdraw its entire air force from the Eastern Front.

At the end of 1941, 69th Fighter Aviation Regiment received the LaGG-3 to replace the outdated I-16 and relocated to the Stalingrad area. Over the next three years he held other commands in various regions, including Stalingrad.

On 9 August, Shestakov was engaged by fourteen Bf 109s of II./JG 77 escorting He 111s of KG 27. 69th Fighter Aviation Regiment claimed nine Bf 109s shot down without loss (II./JG 77 reported one damaged Bf 109E).

Shestakov eventually flew more than 450 missions during his career, took part in roughly 100 aerial combats and was credited with 18 solo plus nine shared shootdowns before being killed in action on 13 March 1944.

On 13 March 1944 (other sources state 12 March), he intercepted German bombers but was never seen again.

== Fate ==
After the war, fellow ace Vladimir Lavrinenkov wrote a book about Shestakov called His Call code - Sokol (Falcon) 1. According to Lavrinenkov's book, Shestakov fought a private war with a well-known Stuka ace - a 'Kurt Renner', who was awarded 'the Golden Knight's Cross'.

No such Stuka ace existed, although the Stuka ace Hans-Ulrich Rudel - the only person to be awarded the Knight's Cross with the Golden Oak Leaves - flew over the same operational area as Shestakov. Shestakov apparently tried to shoot him down during the first months of 1944, and reportedly searched for a Ju 87 with a viper painted along its fuselage, assuming that this conspicuous aircraft was flown by Renner/Rudel.

After his death, it was rumoured that he died seconds after shooting at Rudel's plane, but given that Rudel was never shot down by enemy aircraft in his career, Shestakov could not have done any serious damage to Rudel's aircraft had he in fact ever attacked it. Rudel himself speculates in his autobiography:

Was he shot down by Gadermann [Rudel's rear gunner], or did he go down because of the backwash from my engine during these tight turns? It doesn't matter. My headphones suddenly exploded in confused screams from the Russian radio; the Russians have observed what happened and something special seems to have happened... From the Russian radio-messages, we discover that this was a very famous Soviet fighter pilot, more than once appointed as Hero of the Soviet Union. I should give him credit: he was a good pilot.

According to Sergei Kramarenko, Shestakov was killed when his cannon shells detonated the bombs of a Stuka at close range, damaging his plane. Shestakov bailed out but did not have time to open his parachute.

== Achievements ==
His decorations included Hero of the Soviet Union, Order of Lenin, Order of the Red Banner, and Order of the Patriotic War.

A 1999 book by Tomas Polak and Christopher Shores claimed Shestakov to be the Soviet Union's highest-ranking ace by number of total kills (including shared), crediting him with a tally of 23 solo 42 shared victories; however, such claims are not supported by any Soviet or Russian sources.
