= Sergey Morgunov (pilot) =

- Native name: Сергей Николаевич Моргунов
- Born: 30 November 1918; Chernyatinskie Vyselki village, Moscow Governorate, RSFSR
- Died: 19 July 1946 (aged 27) Kashira, Moscow oblast, USSR
- Allegiance: Soviet Union
- Branch: Soviet Air Force
- Service years: 1937–1946
- Rank: Captain
- Conflicts: World War II
- Awards: Hero of the Soviet Union

Sergey Nikolaevich Morgunov (Russian: Сергей Николаевич Моргунов; 30 November 1918 — 19 July 1946) was one of the top Soviet fighter pilots in World War II, having a tally of 41 solo shootdowns for which he eventually received the title Hero of the Soviet Union in 1946. He was killed in a plane crash shortly afterward.
