= Vladimir Lavrinenkov =

Soviet flying ace (1919–1988)

Vladimir Dmitrievich Lavrinenkov
- Владимир Дмитриевич Лавриненков
- Born: 17 May 1919; Ptakhino, Smolensky Uyezd, Smolensk Governorate, RSFSR
- Died: 14 January 1988 (aged 68); Kiev, USSR
- Military career
- Allegiance: Soviet Union
- Branch: Soviet Air Force
- Service years: 1940–1980s
- Rank: Colonel-general of Aviation
- Unit: 9th Guards Fighter Aviation Regiment
- Conflicts: World War II
- Awards: Hero of the Soviet Union (twice)

Vladimir Dmitrievich Lavrinenkov (Russian: Владимир Дмитриевич Лавриненков; 17 May 1919 – 14 January 1988) was a fighter pilot in the Soviet Air Forces who became a flying ace during the Second World War and was twice awarded the title Hero of the Soviet Union for being one of the top flying aces in the Soviet Union.

== Early life ==
Lavrinenkov was born on 17 May 1919 in the village of Ptakhino, at the time located within the Smolensky Uyezd of the Smolensk Governorate of the Russian SFSR before the formation of the Soviet Union. After completing his seventh year of secondary education on Peresna he attended a trade school in the city of Smolensk. Upon graduating from the trade school in 1935 he was employed at a local aircraft factory, and in 1939 he completed training at the Smolensk aeroclub before he entered the military in February 1940. After he graduated from the Chuguev Military Aviation School of Pilots in January the next year he served as a flight instructor at the Chernigov Military Aviation Pilot School, which had to evacuated to Zernograd in July due to the German invasion of the Soviet Union. In November, a regiment of the 102nd Fighter Aviation Division composed of the instructors from the school was formed for providing air cover in Stalingrad.

== World War II ==
Lavrinenkov was first deployed in the war to Stalingrad as a pilot in the 651st Fighter Aviation Regiment. There he flew an I-15, on which he engaged in his first dogfight after attempted to attack an Heinkel He 111. After the incident his plane was left with only one landing wheel intact, but he still managed to safely land his plane. After retraining to fly the Yak-1 he was reassigned in June 1942 to the 753rd Fighter Aviation Regiment as a flight commander, and on 8 July he scored his first aerial victory when he shot down an Bf 109 during an intense counterattack. Later he and his wingman Pyotr Tilchenko dueled against a group of six Bf 110; Tilchenko was killed in action after shooting down two of them, but Lavrinenkov survived. In August he was transferred to the 4th Fighter Aviation Regiment. As a deputy squadron commander piloting the Yak-7B on the Stalingrad front, he quickly increased his victory tally, gaining nine aerial victories in a span of three months. In October, Lavrinenkov and many of his colleagues, including Amet-khan Sultan and Ivan Borisov, were assigned to the newly formed "regiment of aces", the 9th Guards Fighter Aviation Regiment, which consisted of aces and pilots considered potential aces.

Upon arrival to the new regiment he switched back to flying the Yak-1 as deputy squadron commander. During a mission with Yekaterina Budanova on 26 December 1942 he shot down an He 111; the fuselage and wing of his plane was badly damaged by enemy fire, but he was able to land safely. For having gained 16 solo victories and made 322 sorties he was nominated for the title Hero of the Soviet Union on 28 January 1943; the title was conferred on 1 May 1943.

German forces captured Lavrinenkov on 24 August 1943 when he was forced to parachute out of his plane and landed in a German trench after he rammed an Fw 190. Despite being captured in the Rostov oblast, he was flown to Dniprodzerzhynsk before he was placed on a train en route to Berlin. In hopes that the Germans would be less careful in watching him if he pretended to have no intentions of escaping, he initially made no attempts to resist his captors. While on the train to Berlin and under guard, he and another Soviet pilot waited for their guards to be in a moment of weakness before they both jumped out the train at high speed and hid under the cover of the darkness of night. On 9 September 1943 they met up with the partisan unit named after V.I.Chapaev; the two pilots participated in partisan activities on the ground until the Soviet infantry fully took over on 29 September 1943. Upon returning from being a prisoner-of-war, Lavrinenkov was warmly greeted by Lieutenant-general Timofey Khryukin, his medals were returned to him, and he was reinstated into the Air Force. His shoulder boards were personally presented to him by Marshal Fyodor Tolbukhin. He returned to flying soon after his reinstatement, and on 1 November 1943 he scored his first aerial victory on the P-39 aircraft type. At the end of the year he was nominated for the title Hero of the Soviet Union again for having accumulated 28 solo victories, which he received on 1 July 1944.

After the commander of his regiment was killed in June 1944 and with Arkady Kovachevich's appointment as acting commander being only temporary, Alexander Novikov promoted Lavrinenkov from squadron commander to regimental commander in September. As commander he led the unit through the Gumbinnen, Königsberg, and Berlin operations. During his tenure the regiment was placed on the 3rd Belorussian Front until April and then on the 1st Belorussian Front until the end of the war, after which he remained in command of the unit until August 1945.

Throughout the course of the war he gained an estimated 36 solo and seven shared shootdowns, (Note: Different sources indicate slightly different breakdowns of his tally: different estimates include 36 solo and 11 shared, or 35 solo and 11 shared.) flew over 500 sorties, and engaged in 134 dogfights. He used the number 17 on his aircraft during the war in addition to lightening bolts painted on the sides of his plane.

== Postwar ==
After being relieved of command of the regiment in August, Lavrinenkov attended the M. V. Frunze Military Academy, which he graduated from in November 1948. In March 1949 he became the commander of the 2nd Guards Fighter Aviation Division, which flew the La-5, Yak-9, and P-40. He was transferred to command of the 142nd Fighter Aviation Division which used the La-7 and Supermarine Spitfire in February 1950. In July 1951 he became the superintendent of the Fighter Air Defense Training Center in Nizhny Novgorod. There his flew the Yak-17, La-15, and MiG-15. In November 1952 he left the center to attend the Military Academy of the General Staff, which he graduated from in 1954. After attending the academy he became the deputy commander of Kiev Fighter Aviation Defense Directorate, and in July 1955 he was promoted to commander. In November 1958 he became the commander of the Separate Baltic Air Defense Corps, and in April 1962 he became the senior deputy commander of the 8th Separate Air Defense Army. In February 1966 he was placed in command of the 2nd Separate Air Defense Army and was made deputy commander of the Belarusian Air Defense District; from August 1969 to December 1977 he commanded the 8th Separate Air Defense Army in addition to being deputy commander of the Kiev Air Defense District, after which he became the chief of staff and deputy superintendent of the civil defense in Ukraine. In 1984 he became a consultant at a military academy in Kiev, where he lived until his death on 14 January 1988. In addition to his roles in the military he wrote several books and became a member of the Union of Soviet Writers in 1976. Having been a member of the Communist Party since 1942, he held many high positions in the party, being a deputy the Supreme Soviet of the: RSFSR from 1947 to 1951, the Latvian SSR from 1959 to 1963, the Belarusian SSR from 1967 to 1971, and a member of the Central Committee of the Communist Party of Ukraine from 1971 to 1981.

== Memorials and dedications ==
A sculpture-portrait in his likeness was made by Isaak Mendelevich shortly after the end of the war. A bronze bust of him made by sculptor Mikhail Olenin was installed in Pochinok in 1948.

== Awards and honors ==
- Twice Hero of the Soviet Union (1 May 1943 and 1 July 1944)
- Two Order of Lenin (1 May 1943 and 21 February 1978)
- Order of the October Revolution (21 February 1974)
- Six Order of the Red Banner (31 July 1942, 23 October 1942, 10 July 1943, 1 August 1943, 20 April 1945, and 31 October 1967)
- Order of the Patriotic War 1st class (11 March 1985)
- Order of the Red Star (30 December 1956)
- Medal "To a Partisan of the Patriotic War" 1st class (8 May 1947)
- Order of the Red Banner of Labour (17 February 1984)
- campaign and service medals
