= Anatoly Morozov (pilot) =

Soviet flying ace

- Native name: Анатолий Афанасьевич Морозов
- Born: 4 June 1916; Bezhitsa, Oryol Governorate, Russian Empire
- Died: 18 June 1944 (aged 28) Moscow oblast, RSFSR, USSR
- Allegiance: Soviet Union
- Branch: Soviet Air Force
- Service years: 1934 – 1944
- Rank: Lieutenant Colonel
- Commands: 9th Guards Fighter Aviation Regiment
- Conflicts: World War II; Winter War; Eastern Front
- Awards: Hero of the Soviet Union

Anatoly Afanasyevich Morozov (Russian: Анатолий Афанасьевич Морозов; 4 June 1916 – 18 June 1944) was a Soviet flying ace who commanded the prestigious 9th Guards Fighter Aviation Regiment during World War II.

== Early life ==
Morozov was born on 4 July 1916 to a working-class Russian family in Bezhitsa. After completing his seventh grade of school he went on to attend a trade school, and then worked at a steam locomotive plant until entering the Red Army in 1934. Having graduated from flight school in 1937, he went on to first experience combat in the Winter War as part of the 4th Fighter Aviation Regiment, flying the I-153 fighter but gaining no shootdowns.

== World War II ==
Almost immediately after deploying to the warfront in June 1941 to combat the German invasion of the Soviet Union he gained his first aerial victory, shooting down a PZL.23 while piloting a MiG-3. He continued to tally more aerial victories, including the aerial ramming of a Bf 109 on 7 July 1941 before switching to the Yak-7 shortly thereafter. Having been awarded the title Hero of the Soviet Union on 27 March 1942 for his victories at the start of the war, he was able to quickly rise up through the ranks of the air force, becoming commander of his regiment in July 1942 . Later he was briefly posted to the 287th Fighter Aviation Division from February 1943 until being made commander of the 9th Guards Fighter Aviation Regiment, a "regiment of aces" in August 1943. Despite his high post he continued to fly in combat, tallying several additional shootdowns in 1944 before he died in a fishing accident during a rest break on 18 June 1944. His official tally stands at 11 solo and three shared shootdowns over the course of an estimated 329 sorties.

== Awards ==
- Hero of the Soviet Union (27 March 1942)
- Order of Lenin (27 March 1942)
- Three Order of the Red Banner (19 May 1940, 12 December 1942, and 7 April 1944)
- Order of Alexander Nevsky (22 May 1944)
