= Andrey Kulagin =

Soviet flying ace, Hero of the Soviet Union

- Андрей Михайлович Кулагин
- Born: 4 September 1921; Staroe Zakruzhye, Byelorussian SSR (located within present-day Vietka District, Gomel Oblast
- Died: 20 August 1980 (aged 58); Minsk, Byelorussian SSR, USSR
- Military career
- Allegiance: Soviet Union
- Branch: Soviet Air Force
- Service years: 1940—1955
- Rank: Colonel
- Conflicts: World War II
- Awards: Hero of the Soviet Union

Andrey Mikhailovich Kulagin (Russian: Андрей Михайлович Кулагин; 4 September 1921 — 20 August 1980) was a Soviet fighter pilot who became a flying ace during World War II. Awarded the title Hero of the Soviet Union on 1 July 1944 for his initial victories, by the end of the war he totaled 30 solo and five shared shootdowns. After the end of the war he remained in the military, reaching the rank of colonel.
