= Aleksey Alelyukhin =

Soviet WWII flying ace (1920–1990)

Aleksey Vasilyevich Alelyukhin
- Алексей Васильевич Алелюхин
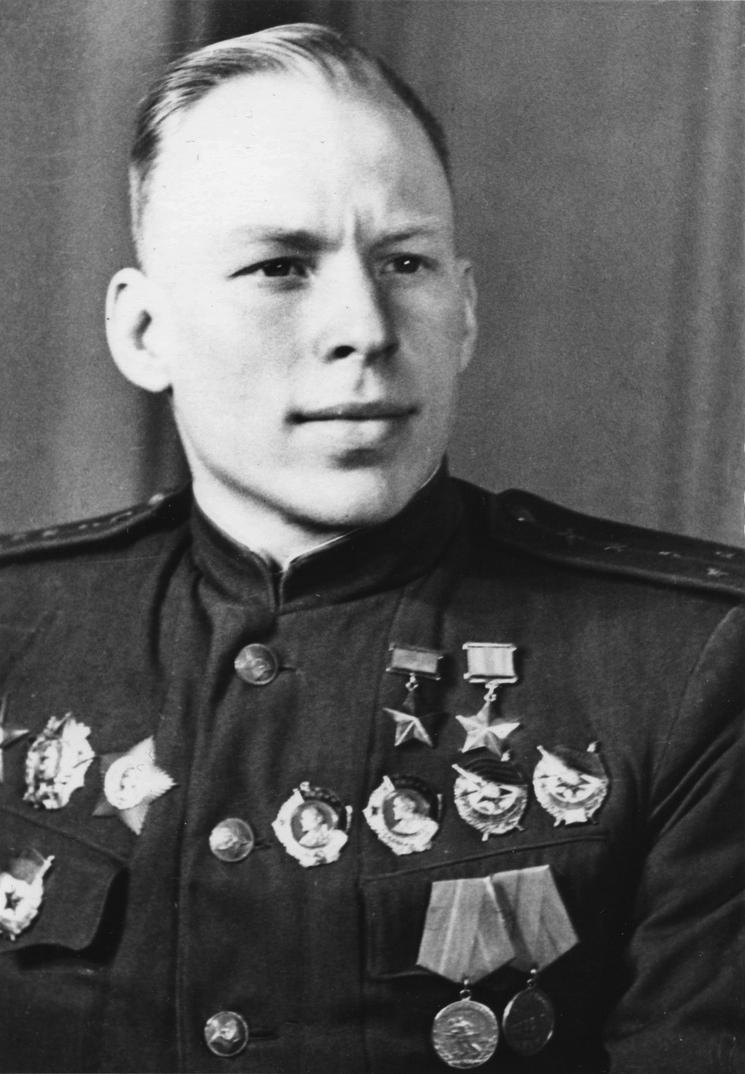
- Born: 30 March 1920; Kesova Gora, Tver Oblast, RSFSR
- Died: 29 October 1990 (aged 70); Moscow, USSR
- Burial place: Novodevichy Cemetery
- Military career
- Allegiance: Soviet Union
- Branch: Soviet Air Force
- Service years: 1938–1985
- Rank: Major general
- Commands: 28th Fighter Aviation Division
- Conflicts: World War II; Battle of Stalingrad; Crimean Offensive; Gumbinnen Operation; Battle of Königsberg; Berlin Offensive
- Awards: Hero of the Soviet Union (twice)

Aleksey Vasilyevich Alelyukhin (Russian: Алексей Васильевич Алелюхин; 30 March 1920 – 29 October 1990) was a Soviet World War II flying ace and twice Hero of the Soviet Union who later became a major general. During World War II, Alelyukhin shot down at least 28 enemy aircraft. He served in the 9th Guards Fighter Aviation Regiment and went on to a series of postwar command positions, retiring as a major general in 1985. He also flew during the Korean War.

== Early life ==
Alelyukhin was born on 30 March 1920 in Kesova Gora village in Tver Governorate. His family moved to Moscow in the early 1930s. In 1936, he graduated from seven grades of school. He worked at the Kantsprom factory in Moscow. He graduated from the city's Oktyabrsky Flying Club in 1938. In December 1938, he was drafted into the Red Army. In 1939, Alelyukhin graduated from the Borisoglebsk Air Force Pilot School. He was promoted to junior lieutenant on 5 November. He was sent to the 69th Fighter Aviation Regiment in the Odessa Military District.

== World War II ==
Alelyukhin provided air cover during the Soviet occupation of Bessarabia and Northern Bukovina during June and July 1940, still with the 69th Fighter Aviation Regiment. The regiment was equipped with Polikarpov I-16 fighters. On 22 June 1941, Germany invaded the Soviet Union in Operation Barbarossa. Bessarabia was now on the front line at Alelyukhin fought in the defense of Bessarabia. From early August, Alelyukhin flew with the regiment in the Siege of Odessa. On 2 September, he was slightly wounded by shrapnel in the back and arm. On 8 September, Alelyukhin received a promotion to Lieutenant. He was awarded his first Order of the Red Banner on 5 November. During the fall, the regiment received Lavochkin-Gorbunov-Gudkov LaGG-3 fighters.

On 10 February 1942, Alelyukhin was awarded the Order of Lenin. In March 1942, the regiment became the 9th Guards Fighter Aviation Regiment for its actions. On 30 July, he was wounded by shrapnel in the back and arm. In late 1942, Alelyukhin and the regiment flew combat missions during the Battle of Stalingrad. He led six LaGG-3s in an attack on ten Bf 109s and shot down one on 10 August. Weeks later, Alelyukhin was flying alone and was attacked by four Bf 109s. He evaded a Bf 109 on his tail six times and escaped by diving to tree-top level. During this engagement, he was able to shoot down one of the Bf 109s. He was awarded the Order of the Red Star on 22 September. On 19 October, he was promoted to Senior lieutenant. The regiment was reequipped with Yakovlev Yak-1 fighters around this time. Alelyukhin became commander of the regiment's 1st Squadron. He painted his squadron's spinners red, a practice soon adopted by the rest of the regiment. He then fought in the Battle of Rostov during early 1943.

Alelyukhin was promoted to captain on 22 March 1943. In June, he was lightly wounded by shrapnel in the head. He was awarded the Order of Alexander Nevsky on 14 July. During August 1943, the regiment received American Bell P-39 Airacobras, on which Alelyukhin would claim at least seventeen victories. During August and September he fought in the Donbass Strategic Offensive. He was awarded his second Order of the Red Banner on 1 August. On 24 August, Alelyukhin was awarded the title Hero of the Soviet Union and the Order of Lenin for making 265 sorties and shooting down 11 enemy aircraft in 65 air battles. In September and October, he fought in the Battle of the Dnieper. He was awarded the Order of Suvorov 3rd class on 8 October. On 1 November, he was awarded the title Hero of the Soviet Union again for making 410 sorties, fighting in 114 air battles and shooting down 26 enemy aircraft.

On 25 March 1944, he was promoted to major. From April to May 1944, Alelyukhin fought in the Crimean Offensive. On 5 May, he shot down an Fw 190 over Crimea, but his aircraft was damaged and Alelyukhin was forced to bail out. He landed between the lines and was rescued by advancing Soviet troops. After the end of the Crimean Offensive, the regiment transferred to Chkalovsky Airport for retraining on the Lavochkin La-7. In July, Alelyukhin became the deputy regimental commander. The regiment returned to the front in October and Alelyukhin fought in the Gumbinnen Operation soon after.

In January 1945, Alelyukhin fought in the Battle of Königsberg. On 27 March, he claimed two Fw 190s over the Baltic west of Pillau. After the fall of Königsberg and the subsequent Samland Offensive in April, the regiment was transferred to fight in the Battle of Berlin. On 19 April, he shot down an Fw 190 over Berlin. Alelyukhin was awarded the Order of the Red Banner a third time on 20 April. According to George Mellinger, Alelyukhin had shot down 40 enemy aircraft and claimed 17 shared victories by the end of the war. He had also made 601 sorties. This would make him the highest scoring pilot of the 9th Guards Fighter Aviation Regiment and the 15th highest scoring Soviet flying ace of the war. However, Mikhail Bykov cites proof for a lower figure of 28 victories.

== Postwar ==
On 13 April 1948, Alelyukhin was promoted to lieutenant colonel. In November 1948, he graduated from Frunze Military Academy. In March 1950, he became the deputy commander of the 151st Guards Fighter Aviation Division. In July, Alelyukhin was sent with the division to China, where it became part of the 64th Fighter Aviation Corps and fought in the Korean War. On 20 October 1950, he was promoted to colonel. In November, he became commander of the 28th Fighter Aviation Division, part of the same corps. In December 1951, the division rotated out of China and moved to the Baku Air Defence District. In March 1952, he became head of the department of department of flight services for the Chief of Staff of the Soviet Air Force, a position which he held until November. Alelyukhin graduated from the Military Academy of the General Staff in 1954.

He then became deputy head of the Department of Fighter Aircraft and Air Defence Tactics at the Air Force Academy. In 1956, he became deputy head of the Department of Combat Training Methods at the academy. In 1961, Alelyukhin became chief of staff of the 95th Fighter Aviation Division and Shchuchyn. He transferred to become chief of staff for intelligence of Moscow Military District Aviation in 1963. Between 1970 and 1974, he was the deputy chief of staff for the 26th Air Army at Minsk. On 8 November 1971, he was promoted to major general. From 1974, he was deputy chief of staff of Moscow Military District on display aircraft. Between 1980 and 1985, Alelyukhin served as the deputy chief of staff of the Moscow Military District aviation. He retired in August 1985 and lived in Moscow. Alelyukhin died on 29 October 1990 and was buried in Novodevichy Cemetery.
