= Nurly Miniakhmetov =

Soviet soldier (1914–1989)

Nurly Miniakhmetovich Miniakhmetov
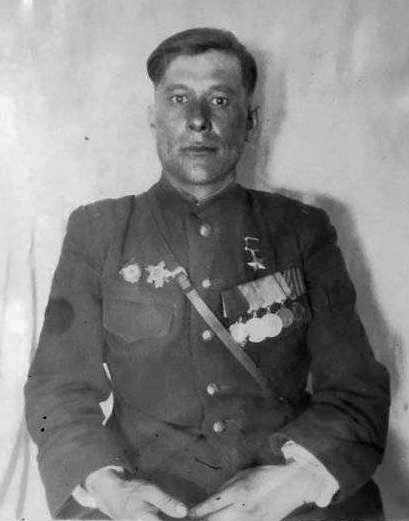
- Miniakhmetov, 1948
- Born: 15 June 1914; Askish, Ufa Governorate, Russian Empire
- Died: 9 September 1989 (aged 75); Tegermenevo, Bashkir ASSR, Soviet Union
- Military career
- Allegiance: Soviet Union
- Branch: Red Army
- Service years: 1936–1939; 1941–1947
- Rank: Starshina
- Unit: 37th Guards Rifle Division
- Conflicts: World War II
- Awards: Hero of the Soviet Union

Nurly Miniakhmetovich Miniakhmetov (Tatar: Нурлый Миңнәхмәтов; 15 June 1914 – 9 September 1989) was a Red Army soldier during World War II and a Hero of the Soviet Union. Miniakhmetov was awarded the title Hero of the Soviet Union and the Order of Lenin for his actions during the Battle of the Dnieper, in which he ferried troops across the river while under fire.

== Early life ==
Nurly Miniakhmetovich Miniakhmetov was born in a Tatar peasant family on 15 June 1914 in the village of Askish, Birsky Uyezd, Ufa Governorate (now in Karaidelsky District, Bashkortostan). He was the second of three sons and a daughter. After completing primary school in the village of Kartkisyak and Baykibash, he worked as a beekeeper on the Kyzyl Yar kolkhoz from 1930. Miniakhmetov was conscripted into the Red Army in August 1936, serving with the 73rd Separate Railway Construction Battalion at Nikolayevsk-on-Amur, and was discharged at the end of his mandatory service in October 1938. Returning to the kolkhoz, he was elected its chairman in 1940.

== World War II ==
After the German invasion of the Soviet Union in June 1941, Miniakhmetov tried to volunteer but was turned down due to his position as kolkhoz chairman. His younger brother Fazylgayan, recently conscripted, was killed at the beginning of the war, and his older brother Akhmadiyar, called up as the war began, would be killed in April 1942. After the harvest Nurly Miniakhmetov was himself called up in September. Selected for the airborne troops, he received sapper and minelayer training in Marxstadt, assigned to the 204th Airborne Brigade of the 1st Airborne Corps. The corps was sent forward to Lyubertsy and Miniakhmetov entered combat with the brigade on 17 February 1942, operating against the Demyansk Pocket on the Northwestern Front. Wounded on 29 March, he spent more than two months in the hospital before rejoining his unit, which was reorganized as the 37th Guards Rifle Division before it was sent to fight in the Battle of Stalingrad in mid-August. Miniakhmetov survived the sinking of a troop-carrying barge on the Volga by swimming to shore and was wounded a second time in the street fighting on 12 October by grenade fragments. Sent to the hospital, Miniakhmetov completed a course at the regimental school after returning to his unit, which spent several weeks rebuilding at Balashov before returning to the frontline on the Central Front in mid-February 1943.

By September 1943, Miniakhmetov rose to the rank of junior sergeant, serving as a squad leader in the 39th Guards Separate Sapper Battalion of the 37th Guards Rifle Division, part of the 65th Army of the Central Front. In early September the division fought in Chernigov–Pripyat Offensive during the Battle of the Dnieper. On 2 September, during fighting on the line between Bezgotkova and Glinki in southeast Bryansk Oblast as Soviet troops advanced towards the Desna river, Miniakhmetov distinguished himself by establishing a crossing beyond Glinki while under fire that enabled the further advance of the division. For this action he received the Medal for Courage on 16 September. Reaching the Desna, elements of the division conducted an assault crossing of the river near the village of Sobych, Shostka Raion, Sumy Oblast on 12 September. Making 35 trips in a rubber boat across the Desna to the Soviet bridgehead on the German-occupied west bank while under fire, he ferried 370 soldiers with their weapons, seven guns and 11 carts of ammunition. Miniakhmetov was wounded on 14 September by a stray bullet and evacuated from the front. He was awarded the Order of the Patriotic War, 2nd class on 22 September in recognition of his actions on the Desna. His superiors also recommended him for the title Hero of the Soviet Union, which he was awarded along with the Order of Lenin by a decree of the Presidium of the Supreme Soviet of 15 January 1944, for his "exemplary performance of objectives assigned by command, in which he demonstrated heroism and courage." Having recovered by early 1944, he was transferred to the 162nd Tank Brigade of the 25th Tank Corps, with which he spent the rest of the war. Promoted to sergeant, Miniakhmetov became a sapper and squad leader in the brigade headquarters company, and received a second Medal for Courage on 31 March 1944. For his service in the war, he also received the Order of the Patriotic War, 1st class (in 1985) and several campaign medals.

Hero of the Soviet Union citation

Guards Junior Sergeant Miniakhmetov, Nurly Akhmetovich, during the assault crossing of the Desna by the 37th Guards Red Banner Rifle Division on 12 September 1943 (in the area of Sobich, Central Front), under strong enemy artillery and mortar fire selflessly fulfilled his duty to his motherland and the order of the division command for operations on the Desna. Being in charge of the crew of a landing boat, within a short period of time, indefatigably and without leaving his post for a moment, under heavy bombardment, [Miniakhmetov] ferried 370 infantry with their weapons, five 45 mm anti-tank guns, two 76 mm regimental guns, and eleven carts with ammunition to the enemy shore. In this he demonstrated the courage, valor and heroism of a Red Army soldier. He made 35 trips on an A-3 [rubber] boat. Guards Junior Sergeant Miniakhmetov, under harsh conditions, at the risk of his [own] life, carried out the orders of the command, ensured the timely transfer of our troops through the water barrier of the Desna river. In carrying out the combat mission of the fording of our troops across the Desna [he] is worthy of the title Hero of the Soviet Union.

== Later life ==
After the end of the war, Miniakhmetov was demobilized in 1947 with the rank of starshina, having ended his military service in occupied Germany in the komendatura at Waldheim. Returning to his home village, he once again served as chairman of the local kolkhoz (renamed Kyzyl Geroy (Red Hero) in his honor) between 1948 and 1951. Miniakhmetov became a member of the Communist Party in 1950 and later managed the kolkhoz apiary before retiring. He married and raised six children with his wife. He died in the village of Tegermenevo, Karaidelsky District on 9 September 1989, being buried in the village cemetery.

In the villages of Karaidel, the administrative center of Karaidelsky District, and Tegermenevo, streets are named for Miniakhmetov. The museum of military glory in the school of Tegermenevo is named in his honor.
