= Baykibashevo =

Baykibashevo Байкибашево
- Selo
- Location within Bashkortostan Location within Russia
- Coordinates: 55°48′N 56°34′E
- Country: Russia
- Region: Bashkortostan
- District: Karaidelsky District
- Time zone: UTC+5:00

Baykibashevo (Russian: Байкибашево; Bashkir: Байҡыбаш, Bayqıbaş) is a rural locality (a selo) and the administrative centre of Baykibashevsky Selsoviet, Karaidelsky District, Bashkortostan, Russia. The population was 1,133 as of 2010. There are 16 streets.

== Geography ==
Baykibashevo is located 25 km west of Karaidel (the district's administrative centre) by road. Bazilevsky is the nearest rural locality.
