= Mata, Komsomolsky, Karaidelsky District, Republic of Bashkortostan =

Mata Мата
- Village
- Location within Bashkortostan Location within Russia
- Coordinates: 55°34′N 57°09′E
- Country: Russia
- Region: Bashkortostan
- District: Karaidelsky District
- Time zone: UTC+5:00

Mata (Russian: Мата; Bashkir: Маты, Matı) is a rural locality (a village) in Novoberdyashsky Selsoviet, Karaidelsky District, Bashkortostan, Russia. The population was 30 as of 2010. There is 1 street.

== Geography ==
Mata is located 64 km southeast of Karaidel (the district's administrative centre) by road. Shamratovo is the nearest rural locality.
