= Razdolye =

Razdolye Раздолье
- Selo
- Location within Bashkortostan Location within Russia
- Coordinates: 55°46′N 56°40′E
- Country: Russia
- Region: Bashkortostan
- District: Karaidelsky District
- Time zone: UTC+5:00

Razdolye (Russian: Раздолье) is a rural locality (a selo) in Urgushevsky Selsoviet, Karaidelsky District, Bashkortostan, Russia. The population was 237 as of 2010. There are 4 streets.

== Geography ==
Razdolye is located 23 km southwest of Karaidel (the district's administrative centre) by road. Urgush is the nearest rural locality.
