= Atnyash =

Atnyash Атняш
- Selo
- Location within Bashkortostan Location within Russia
- Coordinates: 55°34′N 57°13′E
- Country: Russia
- Region: Bashkortostan
- District: Karaidelsky District
- Time zone: UTC+5:00

Atnyash (Russian: Атняш; Bashkir: Әтнәш, Ätnäş) is a rural locality (a selo) in Novoberdyashsky Selsoviet, Karaidelsky District, Bashkortostan, Russia. The population was 584 as of 2010. There are 12 streets.

== Geography ==
Atnyash is located 59 km southeast of Karaidel (the district's administrative centre) by road. Mata is the nearest rural locality.
