= Arkaul, Karaidelsky District, Republic of Bashkortostan =

Arkaul Аркаул
- Village
- Location within Bashkortostan Location within Russia
- Coordinates: 55°38′N 56°19′E
- Country: Russia
- Region: Bashkortostan
- District: Karaidelsky District
- Time zone: UTC+5:00

Arkaul (Russian: Аркаул; Bashkir: Арҡауыл, Arqawıl) is a rural locality (a village) in Urgushevsky Selsoviet, Karaidelsky District, Bashkortostan, Russia. The population was 4 as of 2010. There is 1 street.

== Geography ==
Arkaul is located 60 km (37 mi) southwest of Karaidel (the district's administrative centre) by road.
