= Urazbakhty =

Urazbakhty Уразбахты
- Village
- Location within Bashkortostan Location within Russia
- Coordinates: 55°54′N 57°01′E
- Country: Russia
- Region: Bashkortostan
- District: Karaidelsky District
- Time zone: UTC+5:00

Urazbakhty (Russian: Уразбахты; Bashkir: Ураҙбаҡты, Uraźbaqtı) is a rural locality (a village) in Karaidelsky Selsoviet, Karaidelsky District, Bashkortostan, Russia. The population was 101 as of 2010. There are 6 streets.

== Geography ==
Urazbakhty is located 14 km northeast of Karaidel (the district's administrative centre) by road. Nizhniye Balmazy is the nearest rural locality.
