= Nizhniye Balmazy =

Nizhniye Balmazy Нижние Балмазы
- Village
- Location within Bashkortostan Location within Russia
- Coordinates: 55°53′N 57°00′E
- Country: Russia
- Region: Bashkortostan
- District: Karaidelsky District
- Time zone: UTC+5:00

Nizhniye Balmazy (Russian: Нижние Балмазы; Bashkir: Түбәнге Балмаҙы, Tübänge Balmaźı) is a rural locality (a village) in Karaidelsky Selsoviet, Karaidelsky District, Bashkortostan, Russia. The population was 221 as of 2010. There are 4 streets.

== Geography ==
Nizhniye Balmazy is located 10 km northeast of Karaidel (the district's administrative centre) by road. Urazbakhty is the nearest rural locality.
