= Ust-Sukhoyaz =

Ust-Sukhoyaz Усть-Сухояз
- Village
- Location within Bashkortostan Location within Russia
- Coordinates: 55°42′N 57°05′E
- Country: Russia
- Region: Bashkortostan
- District: Karaidelsky District
- Time zone: UTC+5:00

Ust-Sukhoyaz (Russian: Усть-Сухояз; Bashkir: Һикеяҙтамаҡ, romanized: Hikeyaźtamaq) is a rural locality (a village) in Karayarsky Selsoviet, Karaidelsky District, Bashkortostan, Russia. The population was 27 as of 2010. There is 1 street.

== Geography ==
Ust-Sukhoyaz is located 29 km southeast of Karaidel (the district's administrative centre) by road. Komsomolsky is the nearest rural locality.
