= Shaushak =

Shaushak Шаушак
- Village
- Location within Bashkortostan Location within Russia
- Coordinates: 55°36′N 56°28′E
- Country: Russia
- Region: Bashkortostan
- District: Karaidelsky District
- Time zone: UTC+5:00

Shaushak (Russian: Шаушак; Bashkir: Шаушах, Şawşax) is a rural locality (a village) in Uryush-Bittulinsky Selsoviet, Karaidelsky District, Bashkortostan, Russia. The population was 3 as of 2010. There are 2 streets.

== Geography ==
Shaushak is located 71 km southwest of Karaidel (the district's administrative centre) by road. Sedyash-Nagayevo is the nearest rural locality.
