= Starootkustino =

Starootkustino Старооткустино
- Village
- Location within Bashkortostan Location within Russia
- Coordinates: 55°52′N 56°31′E
- Country: Russia
- Region: Bashkortostan
- District: Karaidelsky District
- Time zone: UTC+5:00

Starootkustino (Russian: Старооткустино; Bashkir: Иҫке Иткүсте, İśke İtküste) is a rural locality (a village) in Artakulsky Selsoviet, Karaidelsky District, Bashkortostan, Russia. The population was 312 as of 2010. There are 4 streets.

== Geography ==
Starootkustino is located 48 km northwest of Karaidel (the district's administrative centre) by road. Itkuli is the nearest rural locality.
