= Chebykovo =

Chebykovo Чебыково
- Village
- Location within Bashkortostan Location within Russia
- Coordinates: 55°41′N 56°48′E
- Country: Russia
- Region: Bashkortostan
- District: Karaidelsky District
- Time zone: UTC+5:00

Chebykovo (Russian: Чебыково; Bashkir: Сыбыҡ, Sıbıq) is a rural locality (a village) in Urgushevsky Selsoviet, Karaidelsky District, Bashkortostan, Russia. The population was 97 as of 2010. There are 11 streets.

== Geography ==
Chebykovo is located 44 km southwest of Karaidel (the district's administrative centre) by road. Arkaul is the nearest rural locality.
