= Atnyashkino =

Atnyashkino Атняшкино
- Village
- Location within Bashkortostan Location within Russia
- Coordinates: 55°39′N 56°33′E
- Country: Russia
- Region: Bashkortostan
- District: Karaidelsky District
- Time zone: UTC+5:00

Atnyashkino (Russian: Атняшкино; Bashkir: Әтнәш, Ätnäş) is a rural locality (a village) in Uryush-Bittulinsky Selsoviet, Karaidelsky District, Bashkortostan, Russia. The population was 61 as of 2010. There are 4 streets.

== Geography ==
Atnyashkino is located 40 km southwest of Karaidel (the district's administrative centre) by road. Nikolo-Kazanka is the nearest rural locality.
