= Kainchak =

Kainchak Каинчак
- Village
- Location within Bashkortostan Location within Russia
- Coordinates: 55°33′N 56°58′E
- Country: Russia
- Region: Bashkortostan
- District: Karaidelsky District
- Time zone: UTC+5:00

Kainchak (Russian: Каинчак; Bashkir: Ҡайынсыҡ, Qayınsıq) is a rural locality (a village) in Kirzinsky Selsoviet, Karaidelsky District, Bashkortostan, Russia. The population was 1 as of 2010. There is 1 street.

== Geography ==
Kainchak is located 85 km south of Karaidel (the district's administrative centre) by road. Ur. Chulpan is the nearest rural locality.
