= Deushevo =

Deushevo Деушево
- Selo
- Location within Bashkortostan Location within Russia
- Coordinates: 55°43′N 56°19′E
- Country: Russia
- Region: Bashkortostan
- District: Karaidelsky District
- Time zone: UTC+5:00

Deushevo (Russian: Деушево; Bashkir: Дәүеш, Däweş) is a rural locality (a selo) in Kurtlykulsky Selsoviet, Karaidelsky District, Bashkortostan, Russia. The population was 210 as of 2010. There are 6 streets.

== Geography ==
Deushevo is located 43 km southwest of Karaidel (the district's administrative centre) by road. Kurtlykul is the nearest rural locality.
