= Novomullakayevo =

Novomullakayevo Новомуллакаево
- Selo
- Location within Bashkortostan Location within Russia
- Coordinates: 55°57′N 57°06′E
- Country: Russia
- Region: Bashkortostan
- District: Karaidelsky District
- Time zone: UTC+5:00

Novomullakayevo (Russian: Новомуллакаево; Bashkir: Яңы Муллаҡай, Yañı Mullaqay) is a rural locality (a village) and the administrative centre of Novomullakayevsky Selsoviet, Karaidelsky District, Bashkortostan, Russia. The population was 483 in 2010. There are six streets.

== Geography ==
Novomullakayevo is located 21 kilometres (13 mi) northeast of Karaidel (the district's administrative centre) by road. Mullakayevo is the nearest rural locality.
