= Khoroshayevo =

Khoroshayevo Хорошаево
- Village
- Location within Bashkortostan Location within Russia
- Coordinates: 55°36′N 56°40′E
- Country: Russia
- Region: Bashkortostan
- District: Karaidelsky District
- Time zone: UTC+5:00

Khoroshayevo (Russian: Хорошаево) is a rural locality (a village) in Uryush-Bittulinsky Selsoviet, Karaidelsky District, Bashkortostan, Russia. The population was 20 as of 2010. There are 6 streets.

== Geography ==
Khoroshayevo is located 53 km southwest of Karaidel (the district's administrative centre) by road. Atamanovka is the nearest rural locality.
