= Kuyanchi =

Kuyanchi Куянчи
- Village
- Location within Bashkortostan Location within Russia
- Coordinates: 55°38′N 56°16′E
- Country: Russia
- Region: Bashkortostan
- District: Karaidelsky District
- Time zone: UTC+5:00

Kuyanchi (Russian: Куянчи; Bashkir: Ҡуянсы, Quyansı) is a rural locality (a village) in Podlubovsky Selsoviet, Karaidelsky District, Bashkortostan, Russia. The population was 55 as of 2010. There is 1 street.

== Geography ==
Kuyanchi is located 54 km southwest of Karaidel (the district's administrative centre) by road. Teter-Klyuch is the nearest rural locality.
