= Yanbatyrovka =

Yanbatyrovka Янбатыровка
- Village
- Location within Bashkortostan Location within Russia
- Coordinates: 55°34′N 56°22′E
- Country: Russia
- Region: Bashkortostan
- District: Karaidelsky District
- Time zone: UTC+5:00

Yanbatyrovka (Russian: Янбатыровка; Bashkir: Янбатыр, Yanbatır) is a rural locality (a village) in Podlubovsky Selsoviet, Karaidelsky District, Bashkortostan, Russia. The population was 29 as of 2010. There is 1 street.

== Geography ==
Yanbatyrovka is located 63 km southwest of Karaidel (the district's administrative centre) by road. Nagretdinovo is the nearest rural locality.
