= Staryye Bagazy =

Staryye Bagazy Старые Багазы
- Village
- Location within Bashkortostan Location within Russia
- Coordinates: 55°53′N 56°52′E
- Country: Russia
- Region: Bashkortostan
- District: Karaidelsky District
- Time zone: UTC+5:00

Staryye Bagazy (Russian: Старые Багазы; Bashkir: Иҫке Бағаҙы, İśke Bağaźı) is a rural locality (a village) in Karaidelsky Selsoviet, Karaidelsky District, Bashkortostan, Russia. The population was 496 as of 2010. There are 6 streets.

== Geography ==
Staryye Bagazy is located 9 km northwest of Karaidel (the district's administrative centre) by road. Sredniye Bagazy is the nearest rural locality.
