= Artakul =

Artakul Артакуль
- Selo
- Location within Bashkortostan Location within Russia
- Coordinates: 55°51′N 56°27′E
- Country: Russia
- Region: Bashkortostan
- District: Karaidelsky District
- Time zone: UTC+5:00

Artakul (Russian: Артакуль; Bashkir: Әртәкүл, Ärtäkül) is a rural locality (a selo) and the administrative centre of Artakulsky Selsoviet, Karaidelsky District, Bashkortostan, Russia. The population was 470 as of 2010. There are 5 streets.

== Geography ==
Artakul is located 40 km west of Karaidel (the district's administrative centre) by road. Abutalipovo is the nearest rural locality.
