= Shamratovo =

Shamratovo Шамратово
- Village
- Location within Bashkortostan Location within Russia
- Coordinates: 55°36′N 57°08′E
- Country: Russia
- Region: Bashkortostan
- District: Karaidelsky District
- Time zone: UTC+5:00

Shamratovo (Russian: Шамратово; Bashkir: Шамрат, Şamrat) is a rural locality (a village) in Novoberdyashsky Selsoviet, Karaidelsky District, Bashkortostan, Russia. The population was 283 as of 2010.

== Geography ==
Shamratovo is located 48 kilometres (30 mi) southeast of Karaidel (the district's administrative centre) by road. Kanton is the nearest rural locality.
