= Abutalipovo =

Abutalipovo Абуталипово Әбүталип
- Village
- Location within Bashkortostan Location within Russia
- Coordinates: 55°49′N 56°25′E
- Country: Russia
- Region: Bashkortostan
- District: Karaidelsky District
- Time zone: UTC+5:00

Abutalipovo (Russian: Абуталипово, Bashkir: Әбүталип, Äbütalip) is a rural locality (a village) in Artakulsky Selsoviet of Karaidelsky District, Bashkortostan, Russia. The population was 261 as of 2010. There are 7 streets.

== Ethnicity ==
The village is inhabited by Tatars.

== Geography ==
Abutalipovo is located 37 km (23 mi) west of Karaidel (the district's administrative centre) by road. Artakul is the nearest rural locality.
