= Urazayevo, Karaidelsky District, Republic of Bashkortostan =

Urazayevo Уразаево
- Village
- Location within Bashkortostan Location within Russia
- Coordinates: 55°36′N 56°16′E
- Country: Russia
- Region: Bashkortostan
- District: Karaidelsky District
- Time zone: UTC+5:00

Urazayevo (Russian: Уразаево; Bashkir: Уразай, Urazay) is a rural locality (a village) in Podlubovsky Selsoviet, Karaidelsky District, Bashkortostan, Russia. The population was 275 as of 2010. There are 5 streets.

== Geography ==
Urazayevo is located 60 km southwest of Karaidel (the district's administrative centre) by road. Nagretdinovo is the nearest rural locality.
