= Novoyansaitovo =

Novoyansaitovo Новоянсаитово
- Village
- Location within Bashkortostan Location within Russia
- Coordinates: 55°42′N 56°51′E
- Country: Russia
- Region: Bashkortostan
- District: Karaidelsky District
- Time zone: UTC+5:00

Novoyansaitovo (Russian: Новоянсаитово; Bashkir: Яңы Йәнсәйет, Yañı Yänsäyet) is a rural locality (a village) in Baykinsky Selsoviet, Karaidelsky District, Bashkortostan, Russia. The population was 272 as of 2010. There are 6 streets.

== Geography ==
Novoyansaitovo is located 20 km southwest of Karaidel (the district's administrative centre) by road. Oktyabrsky is the nearest rural locality.
