= Nizhny Suyan =

Nizhny Suyan Нижний Суян
- Selo
- Location within Bashkortostan Location within Russia
- Coordinates: 55°57′N 57°12′E
- Country: Russia
- Region: Bashkortostan
- District: Karaidelsky District
- Time zone: UTC+5:00

Nizhny Suyan (Russian: Нижний Суян; Bashkir: Түбәнге Һөйән, Tübänge Höyän) is a rural locality (a selo) in Verkhnesuyansky Selsoviet, Karaidelsky District, Bashkortostan, Russia. The population was 1 as of 2010. There is 1 street.

== Geography ==
Nizhny Suyan is located 25 km northeast of Karaidel (the district's administrative centre) by road. Mullakayevo is the nearest rural locality.
