= Sedyash-Nagayevo =

Sedyash-Nagayevo Седяш-Нагаево
- Village
- Location within Bashkortostan Location within Russia
- Coordinates: 55°34′N 56°30′E
- Country: Russia
- Region: Bashkortostan
- District: Karaidelsky District
- Time zone: UTC+5:00

Sedyash-Nagayevo (Russian: Седяш-Нагаево; Bashkir: Сиҙәш, Siźäş) is a rural locality (a village) in Uryush-Bittulinsky Selsoviet, Karaidelsky District, Bashkortostan, Russia. The population was 89 as of 2010. There are 12 streets.

== Geography ==
Sedyash-Nagayevo is located 58 km southwest of Karaidel (the district's administrative centre) by road. Shaushak is the nearest rural locality.
