= Kurtlykul =

Kurtlykul Куртлыкуль
- Village
- Location within Bashkortostan Location within Russia
- Coordinates: 55°42′N 56°21′E
- Country: Russia
- Region: Bashkortostan
- District: Karaidelsky District
- Time zone: UTC+5:00

Kurtlykul (Russian: Куртлыкуль; Bashkir: Ҡортлокүл, Qortlokül) is a rural locality (a village) and the administrative centre of Kurtlykulsky Selsoviet, Karaidelsky District, Bashkortostan, Russia. The population was 410 as of 2010. There are 3 streets.

== Geography ==
Kurtlykul is located 45 km southwest of Karaidel (the district's administrative centre) by road. Deushevo is the nearest rural locality.
