= Bartym, Republic of Bashkortostan =

Bartym Бартым
- Village
- Location within Bashkortostan Location within Russia
- Coordinates: 55°48′N 57°29′E
- Country: Russia
- Region: Bashkortostan
- District: Karaidelsky District
- Time zone: UTC+5:00

Bartym (Russian: Бартым; Bashkir: Бартым, Bartım) is a rural locality (a village) in Ozerkinsky Selsoviet, Karaidelsky District, Bashkortostan, Russia. The population was 158 as of 2010. There are 6 streets.

== Geography ==
Bartym is located 44 km east of Karaidel (the district's administrative centre) by road. Biyaz is the nearest rural locality.
