= Suleymanovo, Karaidelsky District, Republic of Bashkortostan =

Suleymanovo Сулейманово
- Village
- Location within Bashkortostan Location within Russia
- Coordinates: 55°42′N 56°33′E
- Country: Russia
- Region: Bashkortostan
- District: Karaidelsky District
- Time zone: UTC+5:00

Suleymanovo (Russian: Сулейманово; Bashkir: Сөләймән, Söläymän) is a rural locality (a village) in Urgushevsky Selsoviet, Karaidelsky District, Bashkortostan, Russia. The population was 154 as of 2010. There are 5 streets.

== Geography ==
Suleymanovo is located 34 km southwest of Karaidel (the district's administrative centre) by road. Nikolo-Kazanka is the nearest rural locality.
