= Krasny Uryush =

Krasny Uryush Красный Урюш
- Selo
- Location within Bashkortostan Location within Russia
- Coordinates: 55°37′N 56°27′E
- Country: Russia
- Region: Bashkortostan
- District: Karaidelsky District
- Time zone: UTC+5:00

Krasny Uryush (Russian: Красный Урюш; Bashkir: Ҡыҙыл Үреш, Qıźıl Üreş) is a rural locality (a selo) in Uryush-Bittulinsky Selsoviet, Karaidelsky District, Bashkortostan, Russia. The population was 502 as of 2010. There are 21 streets.

== Geography ==
Krasny Uryush is located 46 km southwest of Karaidel (the district's administrative centre) by road. Tatarsky Uryush is the nearest rural locality.
