= Malikovo =

Malikovo Маликово
- Village
- Location within Bashkortostan Location within Russia
- Coordinates: 55°57′N 56°48′E
- Country: Russia
- Region: Bashkortostan
- District: Karaidelsky District
- Time zone: UTC+5:00

Malikovo (Russian: Маликово; Bashkir: Малик, Malik) is a rural locality (a village) in Staroakbulyakovsky Selsoviet, Karaidelsky District, Bashkortostan, Russia. The population was 13 as of 2010. There is 1 street.

== Geography ==
Malikovo is located 25 km northwest of Karaidel (the district's administrative centre) by road. Davlyatovka is the nearest rural locality.
