= Tatarsky Uryush =

Tatarsky Uryush Татарский Урюш
- Village
- Location within Bashkortostan Location within Russia
- Coordinates: 55°38′N 56°24′E
- Country: Russia
- Region: Bashkortostan
- District: Karaidelsky District
- Time zone: UTC+5:00

Tatarsky Uryush (Russian: Татарский Урюш; Bashkir: Татар Үреше, Tatar Üreşe) is a rural locality (a village) in Uryush-Bittulinsky Selsoviet, Karaidelsky District, Bashkortostan, Russia. The population was 258 as of 2010. There are 9 streets.

== Geography ==
Tatarsky Uryush is located 54 km southwest of Karaidel (the district's administrative centre) by road. Krasny Uryush is the nearest rural locality.
