= Yuldashevo, Karaidelsky District, Republic of Bashkortostan =

Yuldashevo Юлдашево
- Village
- Location within Bashkortostan Location within Russia
- Coordinates: 55°54′N 56°41′E
- Country: Russia
- Region: Bashkortostan
- District: Karaidelsky District
- Time zone: UTC+5:00

Yuldashevo (Russian: Юлдашево; Bashkir: Юлдаш, Yuldaş) is a rural locality (a village) in Staroakbulyakovsky Selsoviet, Karaidelsky District, Bashkortostan, Russia. The population was 122 as of 2010. There is 1 street.

== Geography ==
Yuldashevo is located 22 km northwest of Karaidel (the district's administrative centre) by road. Khalilovo is the nearest rural locality.
