= Poperechnaya Gora =

Poperechnaya Gora Поперечная Гора
- Village
- Location within Bashkortostan Location within Russia
- Coordinates: 55°45′N 57°16′E
- Country: Russia
- Region: Bashkortostan
- District: Karaidelsky District
- Time zone: UTC+5:00

Poperechnaya Gora (Russian: Поперечная Гора; Bashkir: Арҡырытау, Arqırıtaw) is a rural locality (a village) in Karayarsky Selsoviet, Karaidelsky District, Bashkortostan, Russia. The population was 21 as of 2010. There are 5 streets.

== Geography ==
Poperechnaya Gora is located 48 km southeast of Karaidel (the district's administrative centre) by road. Komsomolsky is the nearest rural locality.
