= Suyundyukovo, Karaidelsky District, Republic of Bashkortostan =

Suyundyukovo Суюндюково
- Village
- Location within Bashkortostan Location within Russia
- Coordinates: 55°43′N 56°26′E
- Country: Russia
- Region: Bashkortostan
- District: Karaidelsky District
- Time zone: UTC+5:00

Suyundyukovo (Russian: Суюндюково; Bashkir: Һөйөндөк, Höyöndök) is a rural locality (a village) in Kurtlykulsky Selsoviet, Karaidelsky District, Bashkortostan, Russia. The population was 158 as of 2010. There are 8 streets.

== Geography ==
Suyundyukovo is located 41 km southwest of Karaidel (the district's administrative centre) by road. Turnovo is the nearest rural locality.
