= Kaltasy =

Kaltasy (Russian: Калтасы) is the name of two rural localities in the Republic of Bashkortostan, Russia:

- Kaltasy, Kaltasinsky District, Republic of Bashkortostan, a selo in Kaltasinsky District
- Kaltasy, Karaidelsky District, Republic of Bashkortostan, a village in Karaidelsky District
