= Kanton, Karaidelsky District, Republic of Bashkortostan =

Kanton Кантон
- Village
- Location within Bashkortostan Location within Russia
- Coordinates: 55°37′N 57°07′E
- Country: Russia
- Region: Bashkortostan
- District: Karaidelsky District
- Time zone: UTC+5:00

Kanton (Russian: Кантон) is a rural locality (a village) in Novoberdyashsky Selsoviet, Karaidelsky District, Bashkortostan, Russia. The population was 151 as of 2010. There are 4 streets.

== Geography ==
Kanton is located 43 km southeast of Karaidel (the district's administrative centre) by road. Novy Berdyash is the nearest rural locality.
