= Nikolo-Kazanka =

Nikolo-Kazanka Николо-Казанка
- Village
- Location within Bashkortostan Location within Russia
- Coordinates: 55°40′N 56°32′E
- Country: Russia
- Region: Bashkortostan
- District: Karaidelsky District
- Time zone: UTC+5:00

Nikolo-Kazanka (Russian: Николо-Казанка; Bashkir: Николо-Ҡаҙан, Nikolo-Qaźan) is a rural locality (a village) in Uryush-Bittulinsky Selsoviet, Karaidelsky District, Bashkortostan, Russia. The population was 12 as of 2010. There is 1 street.

== Geography ==
Nikolo-Kazanka is located 39 km southwest of Karaidel (the district's administrative centre) by road. Atnyashkino is the nearest rural locality.
