= Davlyatovka, Karaidelsky District, Republic of Bashkortostan =

Davlyatovka Давлятовка
- Village
- Location within Bashkortostan Location within Russia
- Coordinates: 55°56′N 56°50′E
- Country: Russia
- Region: Bashkortostan
- District: Karaidelsky District
- Time zone: UTC+5:00

Davlyatovka (Russian: Давлятовка; Bashkir: Дәүләт, Däwlät) is a rural locality (a village) in Karaidelsky Selsoviet, Karaidelsky District, Bashkortostan, Russia. The population was 27 as of 2010. There is 1 street.

== Geography ==
Davlyatovka is located 25 km northwest of Karaidel (the district's administrative centre) by road. Malikovo is the nearest rural locality.
