= Kadysi =

Kadysi Кадыси
- Village
- Location within Bashkortostan Location within Russia
- Coordinates: 55°38′N 57°04′E
- Country: Russia
- Region: Bashkortostan
- District: Karaidelsky District
- Time zone: UTC+5:00

Kadysi (Russian: Кадыси; Bashkir: Кеҙесе, Keźese) is a rural locality (a village) in Novoberdyashsky Selsoviet, Karaidelsky District, Bashkortostan, Russia. The population was 36 as of 2010. There is 1 street.

== Geography ==
Kadysi is located 48 km southeast of Karaidel (the district's administrative centre) by road. Dyurtyuli is the nearest rural locality.
