= Kirzya =

Kirzya Кирзя
- Selo
- Location within Bashkortostan Location within Russia
- Coordinates: 55°36′N 56°47′E
- Country: Russia
- Region: Bashkortostan
- District: Karaidelsky District
- Time zone: UTC+5:00

Kirzya (Russian: Кирзя; Bashkir: Кирҙә, Kirźä) is a rural locality (a selo) and the administrative centre of Kirzinsky Selsoviet, Karaidelsky District, Bashkortostan, Russia. The population was 459 as of 2010. There are 9 streets.

== Geography ==
Kirzya is located 97 km southwest of Karaidel (the district's administrative centre) by road. Surda is the nearest rural locality.
