= Surda, Karaidelsky District, Republic of Bashkortostan =

Surda Сурда
- Village
- Location within Bashkortostan Location within Russia
- Coordinates: 55°35′N 56°49′E
- Country: Russia
- Region: Bashkortostan
- District: Karaidelsky District
- Time zone: UTC+5:00

Surda (Russian: Сурда; Bashkir: Сурҙы, Surźı) is a rural locality (a village) in Kirzinsky Selsoviet, Karaidelsky District, Bashkortostan, Russia. The population was 115 as of 2010. There are 2 streets.

== Geography ==
Surda is located 94 km southwest of Karaidel (the district's administrative centre) by road. Kirzya is the nearest rural locality.
