= Yavgildino =

Yavgildino Явгильдино
- Village
- Location within Bashkortostan Location within Russia
- Coordinates: 55°47′N 56°27′E
- Country: Russia
- Region: Bashkortostan
- District: Karaidelsky District
- Time zone: UTC+5:00

Yavgildino (Russian: Явгильдино; Bashkir: Яугилде, Yawgilde) is a rural locality (a village) in Yavgildinsky Selsoviet, Karaidelsky District, Bashkortostan, Russia. The population was 453 as of 2010. There are 8 streets.

== Geography ==
Yavgildino is located 32 km west of Karaidel (the district's administrative centre) by road. Taykash is the nearest rural locality.
