= Bayki =

Bayki Байки
- Selo
- Location within Bashkortostan Location within Russia
- Coordinates: 55°50′N 56°48′E
- Country: Russia
- Region: Bashkortostan
- District: Karaidelsky District
- Time zone: UTC+5:00

Bayki (Russian: Байки; Bashkir: Байҡы, Bayqı) is a rural locality (a selo) and the administrative centre of Baykinsky Selsoviet, Karaidelsky District, Bashkortostan, Russia. The population was 1,095 as of 2010. There are 21 streets.

== Geography ==
Bayki is located 9 km west of Karaidel (the district's administrative centre) by road. Karaidel is the nearest rural locality.
