= Khalilovo, Karaidelsky District, Republic of Bashkortostan =

Khalilovo Халилово
- Village
- Location within Bashkortostan Location within Russia
- Coordinates: 55°54′N 56°42′E
- Country: Russia
- Region: Bashkortostan
- District: Karaidelsky District
- Time zone: UTC+5:00

Khalilovo (Russian: Халилово; Bashkir: Хәлил, Xälil) is a rural locality (a village) in Staroakbulyakovsky Selsoviet, Karaidelsky District, Bashkortostan, Russia. The population was 224 as of 2010. There are 3 streets.

== Geography ==
Khalilovo is located 20 km northwest of Karaidel (the district's administrative centre) by road. Novy Akbulyak is the nearest rural locality.
