= Mullakayevo, Karaidelsky District, Bashkortostan =

Mullakayevo Муллакаево
- Village
- Location within Bashkortostan Location within Russia
- Coordinates: 55°56′N 57°07′E
- Country: Russia
- Region: Bashkortostan
- District: Karaidelsky District
- Time zone: UTC+5:00

Mullakayevo (Russian: Муллакаево; Bashkir: Муллаҡай, Mullaqay) is a rural locality (a village) in Novomullakayevsky Selsoviet, Karaidelsky District, Bashkortostan, Russia. The population was 108 as of 2010. There are 3 streets.

== Geography ==
Mullakayevo is located 24 km northeast of Karaidel (the district's administrative centre) by road. Novomullakayevo is the nearest rural locality.
