= Chemayevo =

Chemayevo Чемаево
- Village
- Location within Bashkortostan Location within Russia
- Coordinates: 55°32′N 56°35′E
- Country: Russia
- Region: Bashkortostan
- District: Karaidelsky District
- Time zone: UTC+5:00

Chemayevo (Russian: Чемаево; Bashkir: Сәмай, Sämay) is a rural locality (a village) in Uryush-Bittulinsky Selsoviet, Karaidelsky District, Bashkortostan, Russia. The population was 66 as of 2010. There are 7 streets.

== Geography ==
Chemayevo is located 57 km southwest of Karaidel (the district's administrative centre) by road. Dubrovka is the nearest rural locality.
