= Nagretdinovo =

Nagretdinovo Нагретдиново
- Village
- Location within Bashkortostan Location within Russia
- Coordinates: 55°36′N 56°19′E
- Country: Russia
- Region: Bashkortostan
- District: Karaidelsky District
- Time zone: UTC+5:00

Nagretdinovo (Russian: Нагретдиново; Bashkir: Нәһретдин, Nähretdin) is a rural locality (a village) in Podlubovsky Selsoviet, Karaidelsky District, Bashkortostan, Russia. The population was 155 as of 2010. There are 3 streets.

== Geography ==
Nagretdinovo is located 59 km southwest of Karaidel (the district's administrative centre) by road. Urazayevo is the nearest rural locality.
