= Karayar, Karaidelsky District, Republic of Bashkortostan =

Karayar Караяр
- Selo
- Location within Bashkortostan Location within Russia
- Coordinates: 55°41′N 57°01′E
- Country: Russia
- Region: Bashkortostan
- District: Karaidelsky District
- Time zone: UTC+5:00

Karayar (Russian: Караяр; Bashkir: Ҡараяр, Qarayar) is a rural locality (a selo) and the administrative centre of Karayarsky Selsoviet, Karaidelsky District, Bashkortostan, Russia. The population was 751 as of 2010. There are 12 streets.

== Geography ==
Karayar is located 28 km south of Karaidel (the district's administrative centre) by road. Abdullino is the nearest rural locality.
