= Karysh-Yelga =

Karysh-Yelga Карыш-Елга
- Village
- Location within Bashkortostan Location within Russia
- Coordinates: 55°38′N 57°05′E
- Country: Russia
- Region: Bashkortostan
- District: Karaidelsky District
- Time zone: UTC+5:00

Karysh-Yelga (Russian: Карыш-Елга; Bashkir: Ҡарышйылға, Qarışyılğa) is a rural locality (a village) in Novoberdyashsky Selsoviet, Karaidelsky District, Bashkortostan, Russia. The population was 24 as of 2010. There is 1 street.

== Geography ==
Karysh-Yelga is located 45 km southeast of Karaidel (the district's administrative centre) by road. Dyurtyuli is the nearest rural locality.
