= Chapash =

Chapash Чапаш
- Village
- Location within Bashkortostan Location within Russia
- Coordinates: 55°56′N 56°58′E
- Country: Russia
- Region: Bashkortostan
- District: Karaidelsky District
- Time zone: UTC+5:00

Chapash (Russian: Чапаш; Bashkir: Сапаш, Sapaş) is a rural locality (a village) in Karaidelsky Selsoviet, Karaidelsky District, Bashkortostan, Russia. The population was 213 as of 2010. There are 4 streets.

== Geography ==
Chapash is located 18 km north of Karaidel (the district's administrative centre) by road. Urazbakhty is the nearest rural locality.
