= Zinatovka =

Zinatovka Зинатовка
- Village
- Location within Bashkortostan Location within Russia
- Coordinates: 55°53′N 56°49′E
- Country: Russia
- Region: Bashkortostan
- District: Karaidelsky District
- Time zone: UTC+5:00

Zinatovka (Russian: Зинатовка; Bashkir: Зиннәт, Zinnät) is a rural locality (a village) in Karaidelsky Selsoviet, Karaidelsky District, Bashkortostan, Russia. The population was 2 as of 2010. There is 1 street.

== Geography ==
Zinatovka is located 10 km northwest of Karaidel (the district's administrative centre) by road. Starye Bagazy is the nearest rural locality.
