= Verkhny Suyan =

Verkhny Suyan Верхний Суян
- Village
- Location within Bashkortostan Location within Russia
- Coordinates: 56°02′N 57°16′E
- Country: Russia
- Region: Bashkortostan
- District: Karaidelsky District
- Time zone: UTC+5:00

Verkhny Suyan (Russian: Верхний Суян; Bashkir: Үрге Һөйән, Ürge Höyän) is a rural locality (a village) in Verkhnesuyansky Selsoviet, Karaidelsky District, Bashkortostan, Russia. The population was 17 as of 2010. There is 1 street.

== Geography ==
Verkhny Suyan is located 74 km northeast of Karaidel (the district's administrative centre) by road. Ust-Bartaga is the nearest rural locality.
