= Novy Berdyash =

Novy Berdyash Новый Бердяш
- Village
- Location within Bashkortostan Location within Russia
- Coordinates: 55°37′N 57°07′E
- Country: Russia
- Region: Bashkortostan
- District: Karaidelsky District
- Time zone: UTC+5:00

Novy Berdyash (Russian: Новый Бердяш; Bashkir: Яңы Бәрҙәш, Yañı Bärźäş) is a rural locality (a village) and the administrative centre of Novoberdyashsky Selsoviet, Karaidelsky District, Bashkortostan, Russia. The population was 309 as of 2010. There are 7 streets.

== Geography ==
Novy Berdyash is located 43 km southeast of Karaidel (the district's administrative centre) by road. Kanton is the nearest rural locality.
