= Bayki-Yunusovo =

Bayki-Yunusovo Байки-Юнусово
- Village
- Location within Bashkortostan Location within Russia
- Coordinates: 55°52′N 56°36′E
- Country: Russia
- Region: Bashkortostan
- District: Karaidelsky District
- Time zone: UTC+5:00

Bayki-Yunusovo (Russian: Байки-Юнусово; Bashkir: Байҡы-Юныс, Bayqı-Yunıs) is a rural locality (a village) in Baykibashevsky Selsoviet, Karaidelsky District, Bashkortostan, Russia. The population was 411 as of 2010. There are 9 streets.

== Geography ==
Bayki-Yunusovo is located 34 km northwest of Karaidel (the district's administrative centre) by road. Tegermenevo is the nearest rural locality.
