= Sedyash, Karaidelsky District, Republic of Bashkortostan =

Sedyash Седяш
- Village
- Location within Bashkortostan Location within Russia
- Coordinates: 56°03′N 57°18′E
- Country: Russia
- Region: Bashkortostan
- District: Karaidelsky District
- Time zone: UTC+5:00

Sedyash (Russian: Седяш; Bashkir: Сиҙәш, Siźäş) is a rural locality (a village) and the administrative centre of Verkhnesuyansky Selsoviet, Karaidelsky District, Bashkortostan, Russia. The population was 301 as of 2010. There are 5 streets.

== Geography ==
Sedyash is located 75 km (47 mi) northeast of Karaidel (the district's administrative centre) by road. Ust-Bartaga is the nearest rural locality.
