= Urgush =

Urgush Ургуш
- Selo
- Location within Bashkortostan Location within Russia
- Coordinates: 55°44′N 56°39′E
- Country: Russia
- Region: Bashkortostan
- District: Karaidelsky District
- Time zone: UTC+5:00

Urgush (Russian: Ургуш; Bashkir: Урғыш, Urğış) is a rural locality (a selo) and the administrative centre of Urgushevsky Selsoviet, Karaidelsky District, Bashkortostan, Russia. The population was 704 as of 2010. There are 13 streets.

== Geography ==
Urgush is located 27 km southwest of Karaidel (the district's administrative centre) by road. Razdolye and Zuyevka are the nearest rural localities.
