= Sabankul =

Sabankul Сабанкуль
- Village
- Location within Bashkortostan Location within Russia
- Coordinates: 55°39′N 57°05′E
- Country: Russia
- Region: Bashkortostan
- District: Karaidelsky District
- Time zone: UTC+5:00

Sabankul (Russian: Сабанкуль; Bashkir: Һабанкүл, Habankül) is a rural locality (a village) in Novoberdyashsky Selsoviet, Karaidelsky District, Bashkortostan, Russia. The population was 70 as of 2010. There is 1 street.

== Geography ==
Sabankul is located 35 km southeast of Karaidel (the district's administrative centre) by road. Kadysi is the nearest rural locality.
