= Itkuli =

Itkuli Иткули
- Selo
- Location within Bashkortostan Location within Russia
- Coordinates: 55°53′37″N 56°29′34″E
- Country: Russia
- Region: Bashkortostan
- District: Karaidelsky District
- Time zone: UTC+5:00

Itkuli (Russian: Иткули; Bashkir: Итҡол, İtqol) is a rural locality (a selo) in Artakulsky Selsoviet, Karaidelsky District, Bashkortostan, Russia. The population was 101 as of 2010. There are 2 streets.

== Geography ==
Itkuli is located 45 km northwest of Karaidel (the district's administrative centre) by road. Starootkustino is the nearest rural locality.
