= Stary Akbulyak =

Stary Akbulyak Старый Акбуляк
- Village
- Location within Bashkortostan Location within Russia
- Coordinates: 55°53′N 56°44′E
- Country: Russia
- Region: Bashkortostan
- District: Karaidelsky District
- Time zone: UTC+5:00

Stary Akbulyak (Russian: Старый Акбуляк; Bashkir: Иҫке Аҡбүләк, İśke Aqbüläk) is a rural locality (a village) and the administrative centre of Staroakbulyakovsky Selsoviet, Karaidelsky District, Bashkortostan, Russia. The population was 502 as of 2010. There are 4 streets.

== Geography ==
Stary Akbulyak is located 17 km northwest of Karaidel (the district's administrative centre) by road. Novy Akbulyak is the nearest rural locality.
