= Aminevo, Karaidelsky District, Republic of Bashkortostan =

Aminevo Аминево
- Village
- Location within Bashkortostan Location within Russia
- Coordinates: 55°50′N 56°38′E
- Country: Russia
- Region: Bashkortostan
- District: Karaidelsky District
- Time zone: UTC+5:00

Aminevo (Russian: Аминево; Bashkir: Әмин, Ämin) is a rural locality (a village) in Baykibashevsky Selsoviet, Karaidelsky District, Bashkortostan, Russia. The population was 100 as of 2010. There are 2 streets.

== Geography ==
Aminevo is located 21 km (13 mi) west of Karaidel (the district's administrative centre) by road. Bazilevsky is the nearest rural locality.
