= Biyaz =

Biyaz Бияз
- Village
- Location within Bashkortostan Location within Russia
- Coordinates: 55°55′N 57°29′E
- Country: Russia
- Region: Bashkortostan
- District: Karaidelsky District
- Time zone: UTC+5:00

Biyaz (Russian: Бияз; Bashkir: Биәз, Biäz) is a rural locality (a village) in Ozerkinsky Selsoviet, Karaidelsky District, Bashkortostan, Russia. The population was 174 as of 2010. There are 6 streets.

== Geography ==
Biyaz is located 53 km (33 mi) northeast of Karaidel (the district's administrative centre) by road. Krush is the nearest rural locality.
