= Novy Akbulyak =

Novy Akbulyak Новый Акбуляк
- Village
- Location within Bashkortostan Location within Russia
- Coordinates: 55°54′N 56°43′E
- Country: Russia
- Region: Bashkortostan
- District: Karaidelsky District
- Time zone: UTC+5:00

Novy Akbulyak (Russian: Новый Акбуляк; Bashkir: Яңы Аҡбүләк, Yañı Aqbüläk) is a rural locality (a village) in Staroakbulyakovsky Selsoviet, Karaidelsky District, Bashkortostan, Russia. The population was 278 as of 2010. There are 4 streets.

== Geography ==
Novy Akbulyak is located 19 km northwest of Karaidel (the district's administrative centre) by road. Khalilovo is the nearest rural locality.
