= Maginsk =

Maginsk Магинск
- Selo
- Location within Bashkortostan Location within Russia
- Coordinates: 55°45′N 56°57′E
- Country: Russia
- Region: Bashkortostan
- District: Karaidelsky District
- Time zone: UTC+5:00

Maginsk (Russian: Магинск) is a rural locality (a selo) and the administrative centre of Maginsky Selsoviet, Karaidelsky District, Bashkortostan, Russia. The population was 1,491 as of 2010. There are 24 streets.

== Geography ==
Maginsk is located 17 km southeast of Karaidel (the district's administrative centre) by road. Berdyash is the nearest rural locality.
