= Tayga, Karaidelsky District, Republic of Bashkortostan =

Tayga Тайга
- Village
- Location within Bashkortostan Location within Russia
- Coordinates: 55°46′N 56°19′E
- Country: Russia
- Region: Bashkortostan
- District: Karaidelsky District
- Time zone: UTC+5:00

Tayga (Russian: Тайга) is a rural locality (a village) in Yavgildinsky Selsoviet, Karaidelsky District, Bashkortostan, Russia. The population was 27 as of 2010. There are 3 streets.

== Geography ==
Tayga is located 43 km west of Karaidel (the district's administrative centre) by road. Deushevo is the nearest rural locality.
