= Tat-Kudash =

Tat-Kudash Тат-Кудаш
- Village
- Location within Bashkortostan Location within Russia
- Coordinates: 55°30′N 57°00′E
- Country: Russia
- Region: Bashkortostan
- District: Karaidelsky District
- Time zone: UTC+5:00

Tat-Kudash (Russian: Тат-Кудаш; Bashkir: Тат-Ҡоҙаш, Tat-Qoźaş) is a rural locality (a village) in Kirzinsky Selsoviet, Karaidelsky District, Bashkortostan, Russia. The population was 1 as of 2010. There is 1 street.

== Geography ==
Tat-Kudash is located 77 km south of Karaidel (the district's administrative centre) by road. Alexandrovka is the nearest rural locality.
