= Ust-Bartaga =

Ust-Bartaga Усть-Бартага
- Village
- Location within Bashkortostan Location within Russia
- Coordinates: 56°03′N 57°16′E
- Country: Russia
- Region: Bashkortostan
- District: Karaidelsky District
- Time zone: UTC+5:00

Ust-Bartaga (Russian: Усть-Бартага; Bashkir: Бартағатамаҡ, Bartağatamaq) is a rural locality (a village) in Verkhnesuyansky Selsoviet, Karaidelsky District, Bashkortostan, Russia. The population was 87 as of 2010. There are 2 streets.

== Geography ==
Ust-Bartaga is located 73 km northeast of Karaidel (the district's administrative centre) by road. Sedyash is the nearest rural locality.
