= Yakupovo, Karaidelsky District, Republic of Bashkortostan =

Yakupovo Якупово
- Village
- Location within Bashkortostan Location within Russia
- Coordinates: 55°52′N 56°44′E
- Country: Russia
- Region: Bashkortostan
- District: Karaidelsky District
- Time zone: UTC+5:00

Yakupovo (Russian: Якупово; Bashkir: Яҡуп, Yaqup) is a rural locality (a village) in Staroakbulyakovsky Selsoviet, Karaidelsky District, Bashkortostan, Russia. The population was 284 as of 2010. There are 5 streets.

== Geography ==
Yakupovo is located 18 km northwest of Karaidel (the district's administrative centre) by road. Tuyushevo is the nearest rural locality.
