= Taykash =

Taykash Тайкаш
- Village
- Location within Bashkortostan Location within Russia
- Coordinates: 55°47′N 56°22′E
- Country: Russia
- Region: Bashkortostan
- District: Karaidelsky District
- Time zone: UTC+5:00

Taykash (Russian: Тайкаш; Bashkir: Тайҡаш, Tayqaş) is a rural locality (a village) in Yavgildinsky Selsoviet, Karaidelsky District, Bashkortostan, Russia. The population was 547 as of 2010. There are 6 streets.

== Geography ==
Taykash is located 38 km west of Karaidel (the district's administrative centre) by road. Kazanka is the nearest rural locality.
