= Burkhanovka =

Burkhanovka Бурхановка
- Village
- Location within Bashkortostan Location within Russia
- Coordinates: 55°34′N 56°25′E
- Country: Russia
- Region: Bashkortostan
- District: Karaidelsky District
- Time zone: UTC+5:00

Burkhanovka (Russian: Бурхановка; Bashkir: Борхан, Borxan) is a rural locality (a village) in Uryush-Bittulinsky Selsoviet, Karaidelsky District, Bashkortostan, Russia. The population was 41 as of 2010. There is 1 street.

== Geography ==
Burkhanovka is located 65 km southwest of Karaidel (the district's administrative centre) by road. Kaltasy is the nearest rural locality.
