= Yanbak =

Yanbak Янбак
- Village
- Location within Bashkortostan Location within Russia
- Coordinates: 55°33′N 56°51′E
- Country: Russia
- Region: Bashkortostan
- District: Karaidelsky District
- Time zone: UTC+5:00

Yanbak (Russian: Янбак; Bashkir: Янбаҡ, Yanbaq) is a rural locality (a village) in Kirzinsky Selsoviet, Karaidelsky District, Bashkortostan, Russia. The population was 66 as of 2010. There are 2 streets.

== Geography ==
Yanbak is located 89 km south of Karaidel (the district's administrative centre) by road. Surda is the nearest rural locality.
