= Imyanovo, Karaidelsky District, Republic of Bashkortostan =

Imyanovo Имяново
- Village
- Location within Bashkortostan Location within Russia
- Coordinates: 55°38′N 56°31′E
- Country: Russia
- Region: Bashkortostan
- District: Karaidelsky District
- Time zone: UTC+5:00

Imyanovo (Russian: Имяново; Bashkir: Имән, İmän) is a rural locality (a village) in Uryush-Bittulinsky Selsoviet, Karaidelsky District, Bashkortostan, Russia. The population was 4 as of 2010. There is 1 street.

== Geography ==
Imyanovo is located 52 km southwest of Karaidel (the district's administrative centre) by road. Uryush-Bittulino is the nearest rural locality.
