= Tuyushevo =

Tuyushevo Туюшево
- Village
- Location within Bashkortostan Location within Russia
- Coordinates: 55°51′N 56°44′E
- Country: Russia
- Region: Bashkortostan
- District: Karaidelsky District
- Time zone: UTC+5:00

Tuyushevo (Russian: Туюшево; Bashkir: Туйыш, Tuyış) is a rural locality (a village) in Staroakbulyakovsky Selsoviet, Karaidelsky District, Bashkortostan, Russia. The population was 121 as of 2010. There are 2 streets.

== Geography ==
Tuyushevo is located 19 km northwest of Karaidel (the district's administrative centre) by road. Yakupovo is the nearest rural locality.
