= Teter-Klyuch =

Teter-Klyuch Тетер-Ключ
- Village
- Location within Bashkortostan Location within Russia
- Coordinates: 55°37′N 56°14′E
- Country: Russia
- Region: Bashkortostan
- District: Karaidelsky District
- Time zone: UTC+5:00

Teter-Klyuch (Russian: Тетер-Ключ; Bashkir: Тәтершишмә, Täterşişmä) is a rural locality (a village) in Podlubovsky Selsoviet, Karaidelsky District, Bashkortostan, Russia. The population was 8 as of 2010. There is 1 street.

== Geography ==
Teter-Klyuch is located 58 km southwest of Karaidel (the district's administrative centre) by road. Urazayevo is the nearest rural locality.
