= Uryush-Bitullino =

Uryush-Bitullino Урюш-Битуллино
- Village
- Location within Bashkortostan Location within Russia
- Coordinates: 55°37′N 56°32′E
- Country: Russia
- Region: Bashkortostan
- District: Karaidelsky District
- Time zone: UTC+5:00

Uryush-Bitullino (Russian: Урюш-Битуллино; Bashkir: Үреш-Битулла, Üreş-Bitulla) is a rural locality (a village) in Uryush-Bittulinsky Selsoviet, Karaidelsky District, Bashkortostan, Russia. The population was 126 as of 2010. There are 5 streets.

== Geography ==
Uryush-Bitullino is located 52 km southwest of Karaidel (the district's administrative centre) by road. Imyanovo is the nearest rural locality.
