= Podlubovo =

Podlubovo Подлубово
- Village
- Location within Bashkortostan Location within Russia
- Coordinates: 55°40′N 56°17′E
- Country: Russia
- Region: Bashkortostan
- District: Karaidelsky District
- Time zone: UTC+5:00

Podlubovo (Russian: Подлубово) is a rural locality (a village) and the administrative centre of Podlubovsky Selsoviet, Karaidelsky District, Bashkortostan, Russia. The population was 427 as of 2010. There are 7 streets.

== Geography ==
Podlubovo is located 49 km (30 mi) southwest of Karaidel (the district's administrative centre) by road. Kuyanchi is the nearest rural locality.
