= Mryasimovo =

Mryasimovo Мрясимово
- Village
- Location within Bashkortostan Location within Russia
- Coordinates: 55°40′N 56°28′E
- Country: Russia
- Region: Bashkortostan
- District: Karaidelsky District
- Time zone: UTC+5:00

Mryasimovo (Russian: Мрясимово; Bashkir: Мерәсем, Meräsem) is a rural locality (a village) and the administrative centre of Uryush-Bittulinsky Selsoviet, Karaidelsky District, Bashkortostan, Russia. The population was 243 as of 2010. There are 12 streets.

== Geography ==
Mryasimovo is located 41 km southwest of Karaidel (the district's administrative centre) by road. Krasny Uryush is the nearest rural locality.
