= Tegermenevo =

Tegermenevo Тегерменево
- Village
- Location within Bashkortostan Location within Russia
- Coordinates: 55°54′N 56°39′E
- Country: Russia
- Region: Bashkortostan
- District: Karaidelsky District
- Time zone: UTC+5:00

Tegermenevo (Russian: Тегерменево; Bashkir: Тигермән, Tigermän) is a rural locality (a village) in Staroakbulyakovsky Selsoviet, Karaidelsky District, Bashkortostan, Russia. The population is 432 as of 2010.

== Geography ==
Tegermenevo is located 23 km northwest of Karaidel (the district's administrative centre) by road. Yuldashevo is the nearest rural locality.
