= Bazilevsky =

Bazilevsky, feminine: Bazilevskaya is a Russian surname associated with several Russian noble families, also of Polish origin (Bazylewski of Jastrzębiec coat of arms). Notable people with the surname include:

- Andrey Bazilevsky, Russian politician
- Nina Bazilevskaya (1902–1997) Soviet and Russian botanist, professor and author
- Sergei Bazilevsky (1900–1991) Soviet submarine designer
- Vladimir Bazilevslky (1844–1898), Russian general
- Yury Bazilevslky (1912–1983), Soviet computer engineer, chief designer of the Strela computer

== See also ==
- Bazilevsky, Karaidelsky District, Republic of Bashkortostan
- 3991 Basilevsky, minor planet
