= Kaltasy, Karaidelsky District, Republic of Bashkortostan =

Kaltasy Калтасы
- Village
- Location within Bashkortostan Location within Russia
- Coordinates: 55°33′N 56°27′E
- Country: Russia
- Region: Bashkortostan
- District: Karaidelsky District
- Time zone: UTC+5:00

Kaltasy (Russian: Калтасы; Bashkir: Ҡалтасы, Qaltası) is a rural locality (a village) in Uryush-Bittulinsky Selsoviet, Karaidelsky District, Bashkortostan, Russia. The population was 2 as of 2010. There is 1 street.

== Geography ==
Kaltasy is located 71 km southwest of Karaidel (the district's administrative centre) by road. Burkhanovka is the nearest rural locality.
