= Askish =

Askish Аскиш
- Village
- Location within Bashkortostan Location within Russia
- Coordinates: 55°55′N 56°35′E
- Country: Russia
- Region: Bashkortostan
- District: Karaidelsky District
- Time zone: UTC+5:00

Askish (Russian: Аскиш; Bashkir: Асҡыш, Asqış) is a rural locality (a village) in Baykibashevsky Selsoviet, Karaidelsky District, Bashkortostan, Russia. The population was 64 as of 2010. There is 1 street.

== Geography ==
Askish is located 38 km northwest of Karaidel (the district's administrative centre) by road. Kartkisyak is the nearest rural locality.
