= Vasily Myachin =

Soviet Army colonel

- Василий Дмитриевич Мячин
- Born: 19 December 1918; Soldatskoye, Yeletsky Uyezd, Oryol Governorate, RSFSR
- Died: 14 March 1980 (aged 61); Rostov-on-Don, Soviet Union
- Military career
- Allegiance: Soviet Union
- Branch: Red Army; Soviet Army
- Service years: 1938–1940; 1941–1978
- Rank: Colonel
- Unit: 37th Guards Rifle Division
- Conflicts: World War II; Winter War; Berlin Offensive
- Awards: Hero of the Soviet Union; Order of Lenin; Order of Suvorov, 3rd class; Order of the Patriotic War, 1st class; Order of the Red Star (2x)

Vasily Dmitrievich Myachin (Russian: Василий Дмитриевич Мячин; 17 December 1918–14 March 1980) was a Soviet Army colonel and a Hero of the Soviet Union. Myachin was awarded the title Hero of the Soviet Union for his leadership of a battalion during the Berlin Offensive. Postwar, Myachin continued to serve in the army, retiring in 1978, after which he worked as an air traffic controller.

== Early life ==
Myachin was born on 19 December 1918 in the village of Soldatskoye (now in Terbunsky District, Lipetsk Oblast) to a peasant family. He graduated from seventh grade and worked on the kolkhoz as a bookkeeper. In 1938, Myachin was drafted into the Red Army.

== World War II ==
Myachin fought in the Winter War and was discharged in 1940. For his actions Myachin received the Medal "For Courage". He was drafted again in 1941 and fought in combat from August 1941. He became a Communist Party of the Soviet Union member in 1943. In 1944, he graduated from courses for junior lieutenants. On 27 July, he was awarded the Order of the Patriotic War 1st class for his actions on 24 and 26 June. At this time, he was a captain in the 37th Guards Rifle Division's 114th Guards Rifle Regiment. On 8 November, Myachin was awarded the Order of Alexander Nevsky for his actions between 7 and 9 October. Myachin became a major and battalion commander in the regiment by January 1945. On 10 February, he was awarded the Order of Suvorov, 3rd class, for his actions in 15 January.

Myachin fought in the Berlin Offensive in April and May 1945. On 19 April, he led his battalion across the Oder south of Stettin with little loss, capturing a bridgehead. According to his superiors, Myachin's battalion repulsed eighteen counterattacks by numerically superior German troops while expanding the bridgehead. On 20 and 21 April, the battalion was reported to have killed 400 German soldiers, destroyed eighteen emplacements, and knocked out four self-propelled guns and a tank. During fighting on 22 to 23 April, near Kołbaskowo, Myachin was reported by his superiors to have personally led his battalion seven times in the attack against the German strongpoint. On 29 June 1945, he was awarded the title Hero of the Soviet Union and the Order of Lenin for his actions.

== Postwar ==
Myachin continued to serve in the Soviet Army postwar, retiring in 1978 as a colonel. He worked as an air traffic controller at the Rostov-on-Don Airport. He died on 14 March 1980 and was buried at the city's Severnoye Cemetery.
