= Bazilevsky, Karaidelsky District, Republic of Bashkortostan =

Bazilevsky Базилевский
- Village
- Location within Bashkortostan Location within Russia
- Coordinates: 55°49′N 56°39′E
- Country: Russia
- Region: Bashkortostan
- District: Karaidelsky District
- Time zone: UTC+5:00

Bazilevsky (Russian: Базилевский) is a rural locality (a village) in Baykibashevsky Selsoviet, Karaidelsky District, Bashkortostan, Russia. The population was 47 as of 2010. There are 3 streets.

== Geography ==
Bazilevsky is located 18 km west of Karaidel (the district's administrative centre) by road. Aminevo is the nearest rural locality.
