= Spartak Makovsky =

- Спартак Иосифович Маковский
- Born: 27 November 1920; Pavlodar, Turkestan ASSR
- Died: 27 March 2000 (aged 79); Zaporizhia, Ukraine
- Military career
- Allegiance: Soviet Union
- Branch: Soviet Air Force
- Service years: 1939—1958
- Rank: Colonel
- Unit: 43rd Fighter Aviation Regiment
- Conflicts: World War II
- Awards: Hero of the Soviet Union

Spartak Iosifovich Makovsky (Russian: Спарта́к Ио́сифович Мако́вский; 27 November 1920 — 27 March 2000) was a Soviet fighter pilot and Hero of the Soviet Union who became a flying ace during World War II, tallying an estimated 25 solo and three shared shootdowns. He was also awarded the Order of Lenin, 3 Orders of the Red Banner, the Order of Alexander Nevsky, 2 Orders of the Patriotic War 1st class, and the Order of the Red Star.
