= Ivan Mikhailichenko =

Soviet aviator (1920–1982)

Ivan Kharlampovich Mikhailichenko
- Иван Харлампович Михайличенко
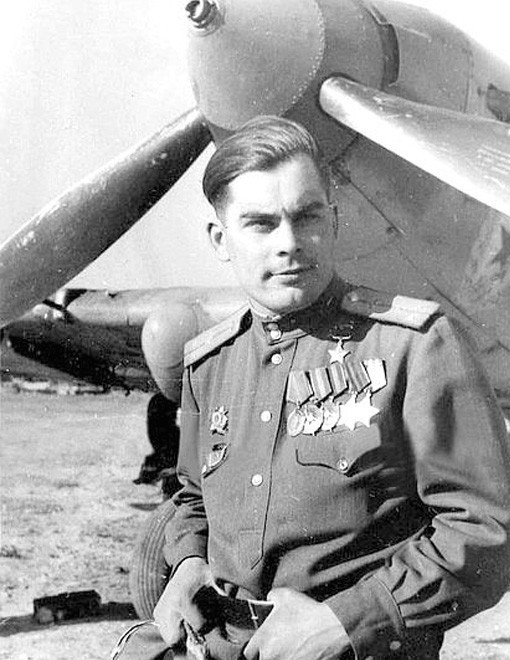
- Born: 2 September 1920; Almazna, Donets Governorate, Ukrainian SSR
- Died: 2 June 1982 (aged 61); Moscow, USSR
- Military career
- Allegiance: Soviet Union
- Branch: Soviet Air Force
- Service years: 1940 – 1962
- Rank: Colonel
- Unit: 141st Guards Assault Aviation Regiment
- Conflicts: World War II
- Awards: Hero of the Soviet Union (twice)

Ivan Kharlampovich Mikhailichenko (Russian: Иван Харлампович Михайличенко, Ukrainian: Іван Харлампійович Михайличенко; 2 September 1920 – 2 June 1982) was an Il-2 pilot in the Soviet Air Forces during the Second World War who was twice awarded the title Hero of the Soviet Union. After the war he flew jet fighters and became a flight instructor.

== Early life ==
Mikhailichenko was born on 2 September 1920 to a Ukrainian family in the village of Almazna. After graduating from seven grades of school in 1936 he worked at a mine and attended the Sergovo Mining School, which he graduated from in 1938. The next year he completed training at the Sergovsky Aeroclub, but did not enter the military until April 1940.

== World War II ==
Soon after entering the military shortly before the start of Operation Barbarossa, Mikhailichenko began training at the Voroshilovgrad Military Aviation School of Pilots, which had to be evacuated to Uralsk due to advancing German forces. Upon graduating from the school in January 1943 he was assigned to the 19th Reserve Aviation Regiment. He remained in the regiment until June when he was sent to the warfront as part of the 667th Assault Aviation Regiment, but later that month he was expelled and sent as an enlisted soldier in the ground troops for a disciplinary violation; in autumn he was allowed to return to his unit and his rank of junior lieutenant was reinstated. In February 1944 the 667th Regiment was honored with the guards designation and renamed as the 141st Guards Assault Aviation Regiment. For his first 87 sorties on the Il-2 he was nominated for the title Hero of the Soviet Union on 12 January 1944, which was awarded on 1 July 1944. He was nominated for the title a second time on 20 April 1945, which was awarded on 27 June 1945.

At the start of the war he was a pilot with the rank of sergeant, but having rose through the ranks he was a senior lieutenant and squadron commander at the end of the war. He participated in the operations for Kursk, Kharkov, Kirovograd, the Dnieper, Lviv, Silesia, Prague, and Berlin; in total scored three solo shootdowns, three shared shootdowns, flew 187 sorties, and engaged in 26 dogfights while flying the Il-2. Less than one month after the victory he was promoted to the rank of captain.

== Postwar ==
Mikhailichenko remained as a squadron commander in his regiment until it was disbanded in 1946, after which he served as squadron commander in the 101st Guards Fighter Regiment before entering the Air Force Academy. He did not graduate from the school and returned to his regiment shortly before it disbanded, so in March 1947 he was reassigned to the 100th Guards Fighter Aviation Regiment. In July that year he was appointed deputy commander of the 28th Guards Fighter Aviation Regiment, which used the American-made P-63 as well as the Soviet-made MiG-9, MiG-15, and Yak-15. In May 1950 he transferred to the 145th Guards Fighter Regiment, in which he held a variety of posts including flight commander, squadron commander, and instructor. He received a transfer to the 147th Guards Fighter Regiment in January 1955, which he remained in until January 1958. That year he graduated further flight training in Lipetsk, after which he became the deputy commander of his regiment. There, he sometimes flew with future cosmonaut Boris Volynov. From 1960 to 1962 he worked as a flight instructor on the MiG-17 and Yak-25 in Yaroslavl. In 1962 he retired from the military with the rank of lieutenant colonel, after which he worked at a mechanic until 1974. He died on 2 June 1982 and was buried in the Vostryakovsky cemetery.

== Awards and honors ==
- Twice Hero of the Soviet Union (1 July 1944 and 27 June 1945)
- Order of Lenin (1 July 1944)
- Four Order of the Red Banner (19 September 1943, 5 September 1944, 4 May 1945; 22 February 1955)
- Order of Alexander Nevsky (22 February 1945)
- Order of the Patriotic War 1st class (24 August 1943)
- Order of the Red Star (26 October 1955)
- Order of Glory 2nd class (16 February 1944)
- Order of Glory 3rd class (5 February 1944)
- Campaign and jubilee medals
