= Valentin Makarov =

Soviet flying ace and career officer (1919–1978)

- Валентин Николаевич Макаров
- Born: 30 August 1919; Sevastopol, Crimea
- Died: 20 May 1978 (aged 58); Minsk, USSR
- Military career
- Allegiance: Soviet Union
- Branch: Soviet Air Force
- Service years: 1937—1975
- Rank: General-major of Aviation
- Conflicts: Battles of Khalkhin Gol; World War II; Korean War
- Awards: Hero of the Soviet Union

Valentin Nikolaevich Makarov (Russian: Валентин Николаевич Макаров, 30 August 1919 — 20 May 1978) was a Soviet flying ace and career officer who rose to the rank of general, having experienced combat in Khalkhin Gol, World War II, and the Korean War. Awarded the title Hero of the Soviet Union on 28 January 1943, throughout the Second World War he totaled 28 solo and ten shared shootdowns.
