= Ilya Mazuruk =

Soviet general (1906–1989)

- Born: Ilya Pavlovich Mazuruk; July 20, 1906; Brest-Litovsk, Grodno Governorate, Russian Empire
- Died: January 2, 1989 (aged 82); Moscow, Soviet Union
- Burial place: Troyekurovskoye Cemetery
- Military career
- Allegiance: Soviet Union
- Branch: Soviet Air Forces
- Service years: 1927–29; 1939–53
- Rank: Major general
- Commands: 1st Ferry Aviation Division
- Conflicts: World War II
- Awards: Hero of the Soviet Union

Ilya Pavlovich Mazuruk (Russian: Илья Павлович Мазурук; 20 July 1906 – 2 January 1989) was a Soviet pilot and polar explorer. Hero of the Soviet Union (1937).

Mazuruk briefly served in the Soviet Air Forces during the late 1920s and then became a Civil Air Fleet pilot. After becoming a polar aviator, he commanded a modified Tupolev TB-3 during the North Pole-1 drifting ice station mission, it was the first such mission. For his actions Mazuruk was awarded the title Hero of the Soviet Union. He became head of the Glavsevmorput Polar Aviation Directorate. After rejoining the Soviet Air Forces, Mazuruk flew combat missions in the Winter War and World War II. Between 1942 and 1944, he successively led the Krasnoyarsk Air Route and the 1st Ferry Aviation Division, both responsible for ferrying Allied Lend-Lease aircraft from Alaska to Siberia. Mazuruk reached the rank of major general after the end of the war and continued to participate in polar expeditions, retiring from the Air Forces in 1953. He worked at the Arctic and Antarctic Research Institute after his retirement and died in 1989.

== Early life ==
Mazuruk was born in Brest-Litovsk on 20 July 1906. In 1915, he moved to Lgov. Mazuruk graduated from primary school and until 1919 studied at a higher primary school. Between 1919 and 1920 he worked as a laborer at the Lgov railway station. In the summer of 1920 he and his family moved to Rivne, which soon became part of Poland. Mazuruk worked as a laborer at the railway station and as a night watchman at the hospital. In April 1923, he illegally crossed the border and immigrated to the Soviet Union.

Between 1923 and 1924, Mazuruk worked as an assistant engineer at a power plant in Lipetsk. From 1924 to 1926, he was secretary of the Komsomol Volost Committee in the village of Kuzminskiye Otverzhki and the Lipetsky Uyezd Komsomol Committee, and head of the school department of the Oryol Governorate Komsomol Committee. Between 1926 and 1927, Mazuruk was deputy head of the agitation and propaganda department of the Oryol City Party Committee.

== Air Forces and Civil Air Fleet work ==
In October 1927, Mazuruk was sent into the Soviet Air Forces on a Komsomol travel ticket. In 1928, he graduated from the Leningrad Air Force Military-Theoretical School. In 1929, Mazuruk graduated from the Borisoglebsk Air Force Pilot School. In November 1929, he was demobilized. Between 1930 and 1932 he worked as a GVF (Civil Air Fleet) pilot in Central Asia. From April to June 1930, Mazuruk participated in the fighting against the Basmachi movement. In 1932, he became a pilot and detachment commander in the Far Eastern Directorate of the GVF. He was one of the first pilots to master a number of new air routes. In 1936, Mazuruk graduated from courses at the Bataysk GVF Flight School.

== Polar exploration ==
From October 1936, Mazuruk was a polar aviation pilot. In 1937, Mazuruk commanded a modified Tupolev TB-3 aircraft that airlifted personnel and material to North Pole-1, the first North Pole manned drifting station. His plane arrived at NP-1 on 26 May after an emergency landing, the last to arrive at the station. He was decorated as a Hero of the Soviet Union and awarded the Order of Lenin for his participation in this historic mission on 27 June. In May 1938, he became head of the Polar Aviation Directorate of Glavsevmorput.

== Great Patriotic War ==
In January 1939, Mazuruk rejoined the Soviet Air Forces, receiving the rank of colonel on 29 January. In the same year, he graduated from refresher courses at the Zhukovsky Air Force Academy. Mazuruk fought in the Winter War between December 1939 and March 1940. He commanded a separate night bomber aviation squadron of the 8th Army Air Force. Mazuruk flew on several TB-3 missions. Mazuruk fought in the Great Patriotic War from June to October 1941, commanding the 2nd Aviation Group of the Northern Fleet Air Force. He flew on several sorties, including a Soviet raid on German naval bases in the Varangerfjord.

Between December 1941 and August 1942, Mazuruk served as deputy head of Glavsevmorput and at the same time was the head of polar aviation. After the July 1942 destruction of Convoy PQ 17, he took part in the search for survivors and helped evacuate sailors from Novaya Zemlya. In August 1942, he became head of the Krasnoyarsk Air Route, responsible for ferrying United States Lend-Lease aircraft. From June 1943 to June 1944, Mazuruk commanded the 1st Ferry Aviation Division, also responsible for ferrying aircraft. During the war over 8,000 aircraft were delivered to the USSR via this route. In late May 1944, Mazuruk met American Vice President Henry A. Wallace on the latter's Siberian visit. In June 1944, he became deputy head of Glavsevmorput and head of polar aviation again, a position he held until March 1947.

== Post-war ==
Mazuruk was promoted Major General on 5 July 1946. Between 1947 and 1949, he was deputy head of the Research Institute of the Civil Air Fleet. In November 1949, he became head of flight inspection and deputy chief of polar aviation. Mazuruk participated in the 1950 Sever-5 drift station expedition and in the 1951 evacuation of North Pole-2 drift station. He retired from active duty in February 1953 and worked for the Arctic and Antarctic Research Institute. Mazuruk participated in the 1954 Sever-6, 1955 Sever-7, 1959 Sever-11, 1960 Sever-12, and 1961 Sever-13 drift station expeditions. He made over 254 flights to polar research stations, including the first landing of an Antonov An-2 aircraft in Antarctica in January 1956 during the 1st Soviet Antarctic Expedition in 1956. Mazuruk lived in Moscow. He died on 2 January 1989 and was buried in the Troyekurovskoye Cemetery.

== Works ==
In 1940, Mazuruk wrote a children's book, Our Aviation (Russian: Наша авиация), published by Detizdat. Our Aviation went through multiple editions and was translated into Latvian, Bulgarian, and Romanian. In 1949 he wrote Pilots' Guide for Northern flights and Taiga conditions (Russian: Памятка пилоту для полетов в северных и таежных условиях), published by Aeroflot. In 1953 he wrote On Our Aviation (Russian: О нашей авиации) for older schoolchildren, also published by Detizdat. During his last years Mazuruk co-wrote Above the Arctic and Antarctic (Russian: Над Арктикой и Антарктикой) and Aeroflot Test Pilots (Russian: Летчики-испытатели Аэрофлота) with Alexander Lebedev, both published in 1991.

== Awards and decorations ==
- Hero of the Soviet Union,
- 2 Orders of Lenin,
- 3 Orders of the Red Banner,
- 3 Orders of the Patriotic War 1st degree,
- 2 Orders of Red Banner of Labour,
- 3 Orders of Red Star.
