= Baykibash =

Baykibash Байкибаш
- Village
- Location within Bashkortostan Location within Russia
- Coordinates: 56°24′N 55°48′E
- Country: Russia
- Region: Bashkortostan
- District: Tatyshlinsky District
- Time zone: UTC+5:00

Baykibash (Russian: Байкибаш; Bashkir: Байҡыбаш, Bayqıbaş) is a rural locality (a village) in Badryashevsky Selsoviet, Tatyshlinsky District, Bashkortostan, Russia. The population was 3 as of 2010. There is 1 street.

== Geography ==
Baykibash is located 24 km north of Verkhniye Tatyshly (the district's administrative centre) by road. Starosoldovo is the nearest rural locality.
