= Kartkisyak =

Village in Askinsky District, Bashkortostan, Russia

Kartkisyak Карткисяк
- Village
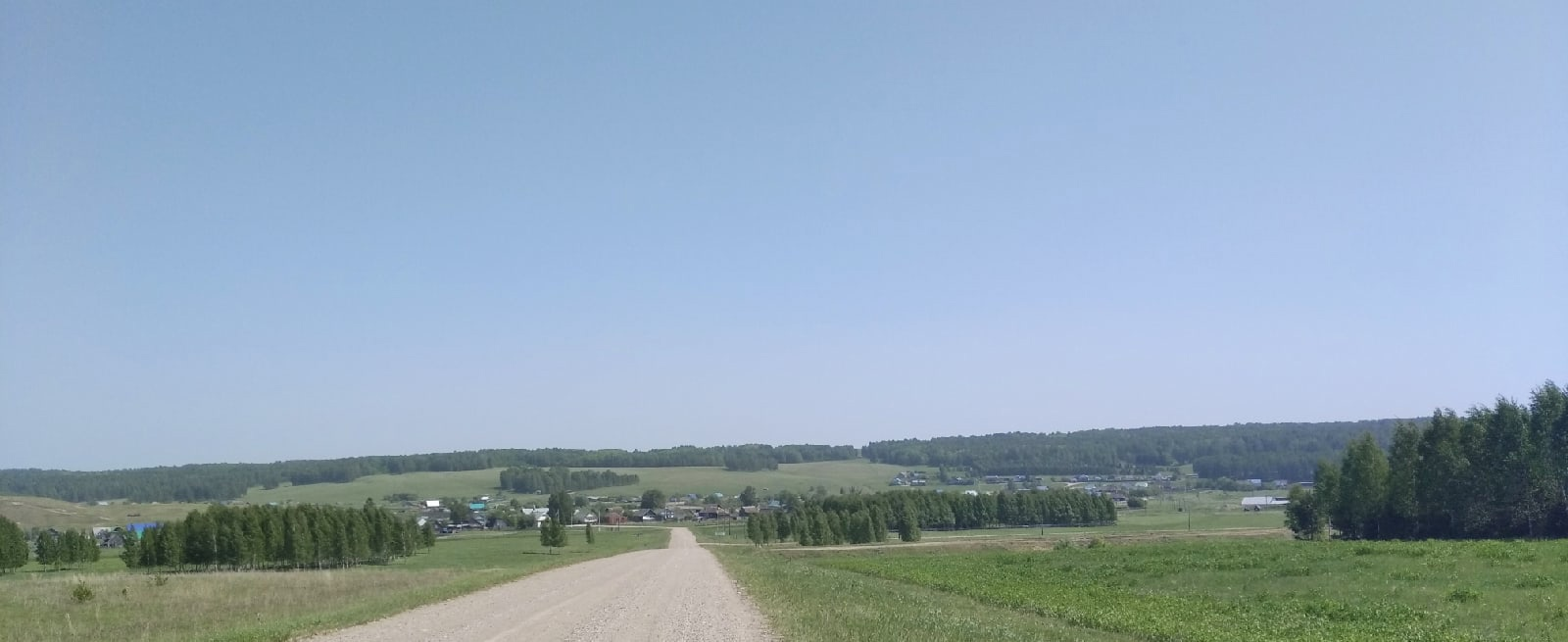
- Photo of the village of Kartkisyak in 2021

- Location within Bashkortostan Location within Russia
- Coordinates: 55°56′N 56°35′E
- Country: Russia
- Region: Bashkortostan
- District: Askinsky District
- Time zone: UTC+5:00

Kartkisyak (Russian: Карткисяк; Bashkir: Ҡарткиҫәк, Qartkiśäk) is a rural locality (a village) in Askinsky District, Bashkortostan, Russia. The population was 512 as of 2010. There are 9 streets.

== Geography ==
Kartkisyak is located 27 km south of Askino (the district's administrative centre) by road. Askish is the nearest rural locality.
