= Soldatskoye =

Soldatskoye Солдатское
- Selo
- Location within Belgorod Oblast Location within Russia
- Coordinates: 50°43′N 35°46′E
- Country: Russia
- Region: Belgorod Oblast
- District: Rakityansky District
- Time zone: UTC+3:00

Soldatskoye (Russian: Солдатское) is a rural locality (a selo) and the administrative center of Soldatskoye Rural Settlement, Rakityansky District, Belgorod Oblast, Russia. The population was 718 as of 2010. There are 16 streets.

== Geography ==
Soldatskoye is located 19 km south of Rakitnoye (the district's administrative centre) by road. Laptevka is the nearest rural locality.
