= Ivan Maslov =

- Иван Васильевич Маслов
- Born: 1 August 1920; Isakovo, Moscow Governorate, RSFSR
- Died: 30 March 2011 (aged 90); Moscow, Russia
- Military career
- Allegiance: Soviet Union
- Branch: Soviet Air Force
- Service years: 1939—1960
- Rank: Colonel
- Conflicts: World War II
- Awards: Hero of the Soviet Union

Ivan Vasilyevich Maslov (Russian: Иван Васильевич Маслов; 1 August 1920 — 30 March 2011) was a Soviet flying ace during World War II. Awarded the title Hero of the Soviet Union on 1 July 1944 for his initial victories, by the end of the war he tallied 23 solo and 15 shared shootdowns.
