= Karaidel =

Karaidel Караидель
- Selo

Other transcription(s)
  - Bashkir: Ҡариҙел
- Location of Karaidel
- Location of Karaidel Karaidel (Bashkortostan)
- Coordinates: 55°50′16″N 56°54′35″E
- Country: Russia
- Federal subject: Bashkortostan
- Administrative district: Karaidelsky District
- Selsoviet: Karaidelsky

Population (2010 Census)
  - Total: 5,980

Administrative status
  - Capital of: Karaidelsky District, Karaidelsky Selsoviet

Municipal status
  - Municipal district: Karaidelsky Municipal District
  - Rural settlement: Karaidelsky Selsoviet Rural Settlement
  - Capital of: Karaidelsky Municipal District, Karaidelsky Selsoviet Rural Settlement
- Time zone: UTC+5 (MSK+2)
- Postal code(s): 452360
- OKTMO ID: 80634432101

Karaidel (Russian: Караидель, Bashkir: Ҡариҙел, Qariźel) is a rural locality (a selo) and the administrative center of Karaidelsky District in the Republic of Bashkortostan, Russia, located on the Ufa River. Population: 5,980 (2010 Census); 5,174 (2002 Census); 4,284 (1989 Soviet census).
