= Karaidelsky District =

Karaidelsky District Караидельский район (Russian)
- District

Other transcription(s)
  - Bashkir: Ҡариҙел районы
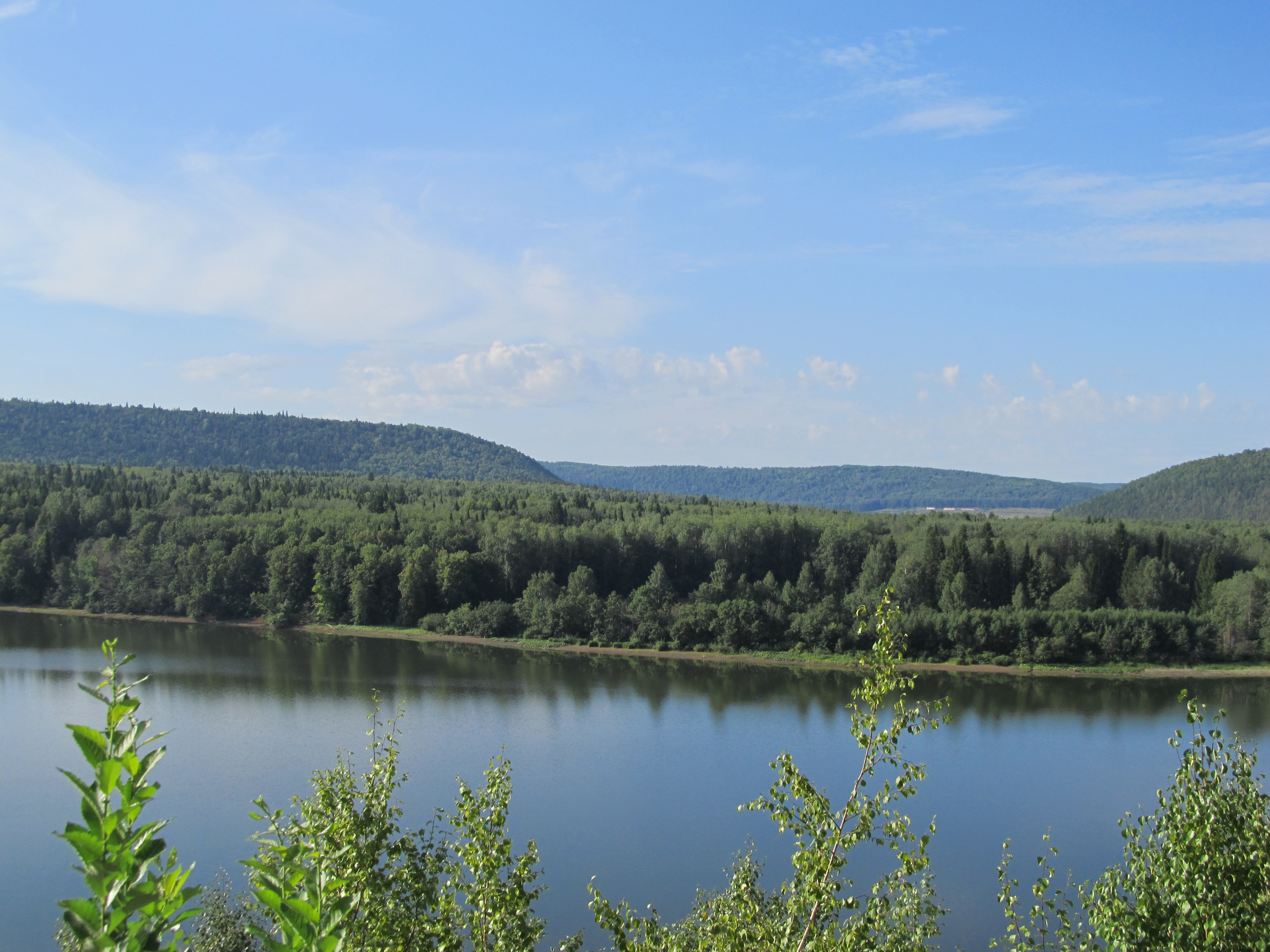
- River in Karaidelsky District

- Flag Coat of arms
- Location of Karaidelsky District in the Republic of Bashkortostan
- Coordinates: 55°50′N 56°55′E
- Country: Russia
- Federal subject: Republic of Bashkortostan
- Established: February 1932
- Administrative center: Karaidel

Area
  - Total: 3,786 km^{2} (1,462 sq mi)

Population (2010 Census)
  - Total: 27,945
  - Estimate (2018): 25,282 (−9.5%)
  - Density: 7.381/km^{2} (19.12/sq mi)
  - Urban: 0%
  - Rural: 100%

Administrative structure
  - Administrative divisions: 17 Selsoviets
  - Inhabited localities: 99 rural localities

Municipal structure
  - Municipally incorporated as: Karaidelsky Municipal District
  - Municipal divisions: 0 urban settlements, 17 rural settlements
- Time zone: UTC+5 (MSK+2)
- OKTMO ID: 80634000
- Website: http://www.admkaraidel.ru

Population of Karaidelsky District
- 2010 Census: 27,945
- 2002 Census: 28,294
- 1989 Census: 30,569
- 1979 Census: 38,580

Karaidelsky District (Russian: Караиде́льский райо́н; Bashkir: Ҡариҙел районы, Qariźel rayonı; Tatar: Караидел районы, Qaraidel rayonı) is an administrative and municipal district (raion)- one of the fifty-four in the Republic of Bashkortostan, Russia. It is located in the north of the republic and borders with the Askinsky District (in the north), the Duvansky District (to the east), the Nurimanovsky and Blagoveshchensky Districts (in the south), the Mishkinsky District (in the southwest), and with the Baltachevsky District (in the west). The area of the district is 3,786 square kilometers (1,462 sq mi). Its administrative center is the rural locality (a selo) of Karaidel. Based on the 2010 Russian Census, the total population of the district is 27,945, with the population of Karaidel accounting for near 21.4% of that number.

== History ==
The district was established in February 1932.

== Administrative and municipal status ==
Within the framework of administrative divisions, Karaidelsky District is one of the fifty-four in the Republic of Bashkortostan. The district is divided into seventeen selsoviets, comprising ninety-nine rural localities. As a municipal division, the district is incorporated as Karaidelsky Municipal District. Its seventeen selsoviets are incorporated as seventeen rural settlements within the municipal district. The selo of Karaidel serves as the administrative center of both the administrative and municipal district.
