= List of Georgian Heroes of the Soviet Union =

This is a list of people awarded the title Hero of the Soviet Union who were of Georgian (Kartvelian) ethnicity. It does not include non-Kartvelian residents of the Georgian SSR who were awarded the title.

- Lavrenty Avaliani
- Noe Adamia
- Galaktion Alpaidze
- Suren Aslamazashvili ru
- David Bakradze ru
- Razhden Bartsits ru
- Grigory Bakhtadze ru
- Chichiko Bendeliani
- Georgy Berdashvili ru
- Nikolai Beriya ru
- Vladimir Beroshvili ru
- Aleksandr Bibilashvili ru
- Georgy Bilanishvili ru
- Grigory Buachidze ru
- Akaky Bukiya ru
- Grigory Gabriadze ru
- Sokrat Galustashvili ru
- Shota Gamtsemlidze ru
- Akhmetger Gardapkhadze ru
- Vladimir Gvantseladze ru
- Ivan Gventsadze ru
- Arkady Gegeshidze ru
- Nikolai Gogichaishvili ru
- Georgy Gotsiridze ru
- Vladimir Gubeladze ru
- Aleksandr Gurgenidze ru
- Amiran Daneliya ru
- Ivan Demetrashvili ru
- David Dzhabidze ru
- Vladimir Dzhandzhgava
- Tengiz Dzhaparidze ru
- Israfil Dzhincharadze ru
- Mikhail Diasamidze ru
- Vladimir Yesebua ru
- Boris Zumbulidze ru
- Georgy Inasaridze ru
- Aleksi Inauri ru
- Aleksandr Kananadze ru
- Vladimir Kankava ru
- Melton Kantariya
- Vasil Kvachantiradze
- Sergey Ketiladze ru
- German Kilasoniya ru
- Shalva Kiriya ru
- Yermolai Koberidze ru
- Vakhtang Lezhava ru
- Georgy Leladze ru
- Viktor Leselidze
- Konstantin Leselidze
- Vladimir Lursmanashvili ru
- Georgy Maisuradze ru
- Karl Mebagishvili ru
- Garri Merkviladze ru
- David Merkviladze ru
- Pore Mosulishvili ru
- Vladimir Naneishvili ru
- Vladimer Papidze ru
- Georgy Papuashvili ru
- Aleksey Pirmisashvili ru
- Galaktion Razmadze ru
- Shota Rostiashvili ru
- Grigory Samkharadze ru
- Bondzi Sordiya ru
- Aleksandr Sulaberdze ru
- Grigory Suramelashvili ru
- Grigory Skhulukhiya ru
- David Tavadze ru
- Georgy Tvauri ru
- Akaky Tereladze ru
- Shota Tibua ru
- Konstantin Tkabladze ru
- Yelisey Tugushi ru
- Vladislav Turkuli ru
- Kirill Ukleba ru
- Noi Urushadze ru
- Zakar Khitalishvili ru
- Ilya Khmaladze ru
- Platon Tsikoidze ru
- Boris Tsulukidze ru
- Aleksandr Tsurtsumiya ru
- Konstantin Tsutskirdze ru
- Porfiry Chanchibadze
- Otari Chechelashvili ru
- Sergo Chigladze ru
- Vakhtang Chikovani ru
- Shalva Chilachava ru
- Levan Chubinidze ru
- Vladimir Chkhaidze ru
- Sergey Chkhaidze ru
- Georgy Shengeliya ru
- Abibo Shishinashvili ru
- Shota Shurgaya ru
