= Georgians in Russia =

Georgian Russians ქართველები რუსეთში Грузины в России
Total population
- 112,765 (2021 Russian Census)

Regions with significant populations
- Moscow, Saint Petersburg

Languages
- Predominantly Russian and Georgian

Religion
- Eastern Orthodox

Related ethnic groups
- Georgian diaspora

Ethnic Georgians in Russia (Georgian: ქართველები რუსეთში, romanized: kartvelebi rusetshi; Russian: Грузины в России, romanized: Gruziny v Rossii) number 112,765, according to the 2021 Russian Census.

== Notable Georgians in Russia ==
- Joseph Stalin, General Secretary of the Communist Party of the Soviet Union
- Pyotr Bagrationi, general of the Imperial Russian Army during the Napoleonic War
- Nikolai Baratov, Imperial Russian Army general during World War I
- Lavrenty Beria, Bolshevik and Soviet politician
- Alexander Borodin, composer and chemist
- Sergo Ordzhonikidze, Bolshevik and Soviet politician
- Porfiry Chanchibadze, Soviet Colonel General and a Hero of the Soviet Union
- Konstantin Leselidze, Colonel-General and Hero of the Soviet Union who distinguished himself at the North, Transcaucasus and Ukrainian front during World War II
- Viktor Leselidze, Colonel and Hero of the Soviet Union who distinguished himself during a fatal yet successful melee assault against Finnish forces at the Svir River in World War II
- Mikhail Mikeladze - Soviet Army major general who held divisional and corps command in World War II
- Vardiko Nadibaidze - Soviet military officer
- David Dzhabidze - Soviet fighter ace of World War II
- Nikolai Abramashvili - Soviet fighter ace who fought in World War II
- Keti Topuria, singer
- George Balanchine, ballet choreographer
- Roman Bagrationi, Imperial Russian Army general
- Pavel Tsitsianov, Imperial Russian Army General
- Boris Akunin, writer
- Marlen Khutsiev, filmmaker best known for his cult films from the 1960s, which include I Am Twenty and July Rain.
- Otar Iosseliani, film maker
- Bulat Okudzhava, poet, writer, musician, novelist, and singer-songwriter
- Zurab Sotkilava, a Georgian operatic tenor and People's Artist of the USSR recipient.
- Nikolay Tsiskaridze, ballet dancer who had been a member of the Bolshoi Ballet for 21 years (1992–2013).
- Georgiy Daneliya, film director and screenwriter.
- Mikheil Chiaureli, actor, film director and screenwriter.
- Zurab Tsereteli, painter, sculptor and architect known for large-scale and at times controversial monuments.
- Konstantin Meladze, composer and producer
- Grigory Leps, singer-songwriter
- Oleg Basilashvili, actor and a political figure in the former Soviet Union and Russia. People's Artist of the USSR (1984).
- Otar Kushanashvili, music journalist and broadcaster who describes himself as "anti-publicist".
- Tamara Gverdtsiteli, singer, actress and composer, People's Artist of Ingushetia, Georgia (since 1991) and Russia (since 2004).
- Soso Pavliashvili, singer
- Mikhail Kalatozov, Soviet film director
- Sofiko Chiaureli, Soviet actress
- Lidiya Vertinskaya, Soviet and Russian actress and artist
- Alexander Chavchavadze, poet and general in the Russian empire
- Revaz Chomakhidze, Olympic water polo champion
- Georgi Sakhvadze, footballer
- Guram Tetrashvili, footballer
- Giga Mamulashvili - footballer
- Robert Mshvidobadze - judoka
- Georgi Mikadze - footballer
- Georgi Melkadze - footballer
- David Khurtsidze - footballer
- Vladimir Kobakhidze - footballer
- Aleksandr Kakhidze - footballer
- Yuri Okroshidze - football coach and a former player
- Nodari Maisuradze - pair scater
- Georgi Zamtaradze - male futsal player, playing as a goalkeeper
- Morisi Kvitelashvili - figure scater
- Georgii Kushitashvili - boxer
- Mikhail Mamiashvili - Greco-Roman wrestler
- Badri Spanderashvili - football coach and a former player
- Gogi Naskidashvili - Soviet slalom canoeist who competed in the early 1970s
- Robert Shavlakadze - Soviet high jumper
- Anton Sikharulidze - pair skater
- Omari Tetradze - footballer
- Anna Chakvetadze - tennis player
- Anastasia Dolidze - pair skater
- Tea Donguzashvili - judoka
- Dali Liluashvili - judoka
- Petre Melikishvili - chemist
- Natela Dzalamidze - tennis player
- Alexandra Shubladze - tennis player
- Samson Kutateladze - Soviet heat physicist and hydrodynamist
- Albert Tavkhelidze - mathemacian
- Aleksandr Nadiradze - Soviet engineer who was instrumental in militarization of the former Soviet space program
- Semyon Kutateladze - mathematician
- Rusudana Nikoladze - inorganic chemist
- Olga Guramishvili-Nikoladze - biologist and educator
- Sardion Aleksi-Meskhishvili - critic, translator, and military doctor
- Svetlana Sukhishvili - polymer scientist known for her research on multilayer polymer laminates with tunable material properties,[1] on artificial skin that can release and re-absorb antibiotics in response to different stimuli, and on self-healing Diels–Alder polymer films that can protect spacecraft and military equipment against high-velocity particles
- Mikhail Gvishiani - officer of the Soviet NKVD
- Dzhermen Gvishiani - Soviet and Russian philosopher, sociologist, management theorist and scientific administrator
- Alexei Gvishiani - scientist, full member (academician) of the Russian Academy of Sciences (RAS)
- Samson Shatashvili - theoretical and mathematical physicist
- Yustin Djanelidze - Soviet lieutenant general, Hero of Socialist Labour, and pioneer of cardiac surgery in the 20th century
- Henri Rukhadze - Soviet and Russian physicist, Doctor of physical and mathematical Sciences, professor, laureate of State Prizes (twice) and M. V. Lomonosov Prize
- Dimitri Arakishvili - Soviet composer and ethnomusicologist
- Mikhail Berulava - scientist and politician, Deputy of the State Duma of Russia, a member of the Communist Party of the Russian Federation (CPRF), and is the Deputy Chairman of the Committee on Education
- Nikolay Chkheidze - Menshevik president of the Executive Committee of Petrograd Soviet
- Maksim Kavdzharadze - politician who is a member of the Federation Council as the representative of the Lipetsk Oblast Council of Deputies
- Vissarion Lominadze - revolutionary and Soviet politician
- Alexander Svanidze - Old Bolshevik, politician and historian
- Filipp Makharadze - Bolshevik revolutionary and government official
- Nestor Kalandarishvili - revolutionary socialist and military commander
- Galaktion Alpaidze - military officer of Georgian ethnicity in the former Soviet Army whose career saw military actions in the Eastern front of the World War II
- Giorgi Abashvili - Soviet naval commander and vice-admiral (1955)
- George Balanchine - ballet choreographer, recognized as one of the most influential choreographers of the 20th century
- Andria Balanchivadze - composer
- Sergo Goglidze - Soviet security officer, NKVD official and Colonel General of State Security
- Vasil Mzhavanadze - member of the CPSU's Politburo from June 29, 1957 to December 18, 1972
- Ivane Andronikashvili - Russian Imperial general
- Ivane Amilakhvari - military commander in Imperial Russian service
- Vladimir Mikhailovich Yashvil - Russian Imperial general of Georgian noble origin (Iashvili) personally involved in the assassination of Paul I of Russian Empire (1801)
- Lev Mikhailovich Yashvil - nobleman and a general of the Imperial Russian Army
- Sophie Shevardnadze - journalist, presenter, author and producer
- Ekaterina Kotrikadze - journalist and media manager, host of the TV Rain channel and the former head of the information service of the RTVI TV channel
- Mikhail Alexandrovich Nakashidze - entrepreneur and officer in the Russian Imperial Army
- Alexander Davidovich Nakashidze - Russian imperial general, who was responsible for several decisive victories against rebellious factions during the Caucasian War
- Valery Meladze - singer and a Meritorious Artist of Russia
- Nektarios Chargeishvili - Soviet composer, as well as an educator and a philosopher
- L'One - rapper
- Otar Taktakishvili - composer
- Aleksandr Mindadze - scriptwriter and director
- Nikolai Svanidze - television and radio host and member of the Public Chamber of Russia
- Galina Dzhugashvili - russian translator of french
- Noah Dumbadze - Soviet Guards soldier who fought in World War II and Full Cavallier of the Order of Glory

== See also ==
- Georgia–Russia relations
- Russians in Georgia
- Georgians in Ukraine
