= Battle of Gródek =

Battle of Grodek, Battle of Gródek or Battle of Horodok may refer to the following battles in Gródek (now Horodok in Lviv Oblast, Ukraine):

- Battle of Horodok (1655) during the Russo-Polish War 1654–1667
- Battle of Gródek (1914) during World War I, inspiration for the poem Grodek by Georg Trakl
- Battle of Gródek (1915) during World War I
