= Holy Transfiguration Monastery =

Holy Transfiguration Monastery or Holy Transfiguration Monastery Church may refer to:

== Albania ==
- Holy Transfiguration Monastery Church, Çatistë
- Holy Transfiguration Monastery Church, Mingul

== Canada ==
- Holy Transfiguration Monastery (Milton, Ontario)

== Ukraine ==
- Holy Transfiguration Monastery (Horodok, Ukraine)
