= Anatoly Kuzovnikov =

- Born: Anatoly Aleksandrovich Kuzovnikov; 9 November 1922; Village Pokrovka, Pokrovsky Raion, Orenburg Oblast, Orenburg Oblast, RSFSR
- Died: 17 November 2004 (aged 82); Moscow, Russia
- Education: Moscow State University
- Scientific career
- Fields: Applied physics
- Workplaces: Moscow State University

Anatoly Aleksandrovich Kuzovnikov (Russian: Анатолий Александрович Кузовников; November 9, 1922 – November 17, 2004) — was a Soviet and Russian physicist. Doctor of physical and mathematical Sciences, honored Professor of Moscow state University.

== Biography ==
A. Kuzovnikov was born on November 9, 1922, in the village of Pokrovka in the Pokrovsky District of the Orenburg Oblast. In 1940, he graduated from high school and was drafted into the Red Army. Met the war at the age of 19, fought in the engineering and technical services of the Air Forces.

After the end of the war, having been demobilized from the army, A. A. Kuzovnikov entered the physics and mathematics Department of the Kazakh State University in 1946. In 1949, he transferred to the physics Department of Moscow State University, where he graduated in 1951 and was left in graduate school at the Department of electronics.

Prepared 23 candidates and 3 doctors of science.

He died on November 17, 2004.

== Publications ==
He has published more than 200 scientific papers in domestic and foreign journals.

=== Books ===
- "Физика граничных слоев плазмы", Москва, Издательство МГУ (Physics of plasma boundary layers, Moscow, Moscow state University publishing House)
- "Зондовая диагностика плазмы газоразрядных источников света", Саранск, Издательство Мордовского Госуниверситета ("Probe diagnostics of plasma of gas-discharge light sources", Saransk, Publishing house of Mordovia state University)

== See also ==
- Pavel Kaskarov
- Henri Rukhadze

== Links ==
- In memory of A. A. Kuzovnikov, the newspaper " Soviet physicist"
- Kuzovnikov Anatoly, the Immortal regiment-Moscow
