= Roman Kanafotskyi =

Ukrainian footballer and coach (1938–2021)

Personal information
- Full name: Roman Andriyovych Kanafotskyi
- Date of birth: 4 February 1938
- Place of birth: Horodok Yahaylivskyi, Polish Second Republic (present day Ukraine)
- Date of death: 9 April 2021 (aged 83)
- Place of death: Dnipro, Ukraine
- Position: Defender

Youth career
- 195?–1958: Youth Sportive School Horodok

Senior career*
Years	Team	Apps	(Gls)
1958–1959	Avanhard Horodok (amateurs)		
1959	Avanhard Ternopil	19	(0)
1960–1962	Naftovyk Drohobych	69	(1)
1963–1968	Dnipro Dnipropetrovsk	139	(2)
1969	Kryvbas Kryvyi Rih	28	(0)
1970	Trubnyk Nikopol		

Managerial career
- 1972–2017: Dnipro Dnipropetrovsk (administrator)
- 2017–2021: SC Dnipro-1 (administrator)
- * Club domestic league appearances and goals

Roman Kanafotskyi (Ukrainian: Роман Андрійович Канафоцький; 4 February 1938 – 9 April 2021) was a Ukrainian professional football administrator and player.

== Playing and chairman career ==
Born in Horodok, Western Ukraine, Kanafotskyi was a product of the local youth sportive school. His first trained was S. Nyrko. He made his professional career in the different football teams of the Ukrainian SSR.

Since 1972 he worked as an administrator with Dnipro Dnipropetrovsk and after that, with SC Dnipro-1.

== Death ==
Kanafotskyi died on 9 April 2021 at the age of 83.
