= Roman Lysko =

Ukrainian Greek Catholic priest and martyr

Blessed Roman Lysko
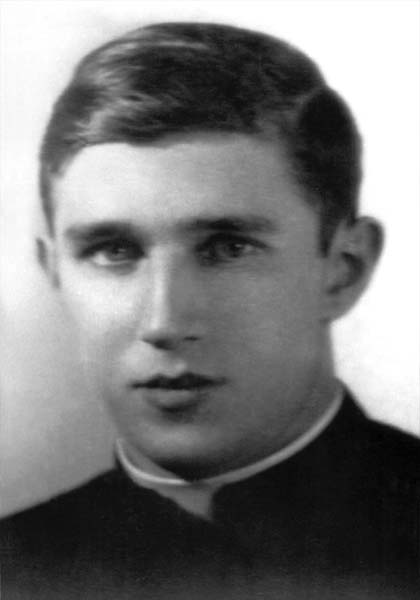
- Born: 14 August 1914; Gródek, Austrian Galicia, Austro-Hungary (now Horodok, Ukraine)
- Died: 14 October 1949 (aged 35); Lviv, Ukrainian SSR, Soviet Union
- Cause of death: starvation, immurement
- Venerated in: Catholic Church
- Beatified: 27 June 2001, Ukraine by Pope John Paul II

Roman Volodymyrovych Lysko (Ukrainian: Роман Володимирович Лиско; 14 August 1914 – 14 October 1949) was a Ukrainian Greek Catholic priest and martyr.

== Biography ==
Lysko was born on 14 August 1914 in Horodok, Lviv Oblast. He studied theology and graduated from the Lviv Theological Academy. On 28 August 1941 he was ordained a priest by Metropolitan Andrey Sheptytsky. He served as the pastor of the Archeparchy of Lviv for Ukrainians.

He was assigned as administrator for the parish in the village of Kotliw, Oliyiv county. Later, in 1944, Lysko was assigned to a parish in the village of Belzets, Zolochiv county. He was also a member of the underground Ukrainian youth organization Plast in his 30s and leader of the Plast group "Fox" (Ukrainian: Лис). Lysko was active in working with youth along with his wife.

During the Soviet persecutions of Greek Catholics, he refused to sign a statement that he had converted to Orthodoxy. As a result, he was arrested by the NKVD on 9 September 1949 and was placed in a prison in Lviv.

People who lived near the prison reported hearing Lysko loudly sing the Psalms after he had been tortured. His torturers reportedly thought he had gone insane.

Lysko was immured in the prison walls and died by starvation. The official date given for his death was 14 October 1949.

His family attempted to find out his fate for many years. Finally, in 1956, they were told that he died as a result of heart paralysis, but witnesses reported seeing him in prison after that date, and they also stated that they had heard him singing the Psalms from his prison cell. Lysko is considered a martyr since he died for his faith.

A plaque on the building on Lonsky Avenue where he was imprisoned now reads, "Here, within the walls of this building, entombed alive, lies Father Roman Lysko, who gave up his life for his faith."

He was beatified by Pope John Paul II on 27 June 2001.

== Niece's testimony ==
"He was imprisoned on Lontskyi Street. His mother brought him some packages. Sometimes his grandmother came from Zhulychi to visit him. At first the packages were accepted. The prisoner always had the right to thank the giver with the same card with which the package was sent. These cards were always sent back; even the bags in which they usually put the packages were sent back. And there were always those cards, on which he wrote 'Thank you. Many kisses.', and signed it. After the murder of Halan [a communist agitator], they refused to accept packages. But after 6 months, when they started to accept packages again, then the relatives found a card with 'thanks' and a signature written, but in a stranger's hand. It was a completely different handwriting." – From an interview with his niece, Lidia Kupchyk.
