= House of Nakashidze =

- Coat of arms
- Place of origin: Principality of Guria

The House of Nakashidze (Georgian: ნაკაშიძე) is a noble family in Georgia, one of the princely houses hailing from the province of Guria.

== History ==
In the Principality of Guria, they held the hereditary office of Receivers of Ambassadors, as well as the bailiffship (mouravi) of Shemokmedi, Ozurgeti, and Chochkhati. After the Russian annexation of Guria (1828), the family was received among the princely nobility of the Russian Empire (December 6, 1850). The family produced several military figures and bureaucrats in the Imperial Russian service into the 20th century.

== Notable members ==
- Liza Nakashidze-Bolkvadze (1885–1938), a Social-Democratic politician
- Nino Nakashidze (1872–1963), a writer
- Iveri Nakashidze (2006)
- Prince Alexander Davidovich Nakashidze (1837 – 1905), Russian imperial general
- Prince Mikhail Alexandrovich Nakashidze (1873 – 1906), Russian imperial officer
- Giorgi Nakashidze (born 1971), Georgian actor
