= Tengiz Japaridze =

- Born: 27 January 1925; Tbilisi, Georgian SSR
- Died: 1998; Tbilisi, Georgian SSR
- Military career
- Allegiance: Soviet Union
- Branch: Red Army
- Service years: 1943 – 1945
- Rank: Guards Lieutenant
- Unit: 52nd Guards Tank Brigade
- Commands: T-34
- Conflicts: World War II; Lvov-Sandomierz Offensive; Kamenets–Podolsky pocket; Vistula–Oder offensive
- Awards: Hero of the Soviet Union

Tengiz Japaridze (Georgian: თენგიზ ჯაფარიძე, Russian: Тенгиз Иванович Джапаридзе, Tengiz Ivanovich Japaridze; 27 January 1925 – 1998) was a Soviet tank commander in World War II. He became a Hero of the Soviet Union during his earlier role as a loader in a T-34, alongside gunner Georgy Komarichev.

== Early life ==
Tengiz Japaridze was born in Tbilisi, Georgian SSR into a working-class family. After finishing 10th grade he began an apprenticeship as machine operator at a munitions factory. When the war broke out, Japaridze was still in high school. On May 1943 he was drafted into the Soviet military.

== World War II ==
=== Tank loader ===
During his first year of service, Japaridze received training as a loader for the T-34 medium tank. He was subsequently promoted to Junior sergeant and deployed to the 1st Ukrainian Front, where he joined the crew of company commander Tokarev, part of the 52nd Guards Tank Brigade. On 6 March 1944 at the Kamenets–Podolsky pocket, Japaridze's tank advanced West of Khmelnytskyi into Antoniny and beyond, in order to cut off the railway connection between Khmelnytskyi and Ternopil. To counter Soviet tank operations in the area, Germany deployed armor from the 25th Panzer Division and 2nd SS Panzer Division Das Reich. Tokarev's crew was subjected to daily attacks by enemy armor. On 17 March gunner Komarichev and loader Japaridze distuingished themselves by destroying or disabling 17 enemy tanks on that single day. Despite their numbers dwindling too, the Soviet force continued their advance southwards. Japaridze's T-34 took part in the battle for the small town Mochulintsy and subsequently on 24 March, after seizing another vital railway connection, captured a large cargo train that was transporting fuel and ammunition. When Ternopil's garrison was surrounded, the Germans sent a relief force that included elements from 9th Panzer-Division. In the engagements that followed, dozens more German tanks were destroyed. For his role in that, Japaridze was awarded the Medal "For Courage".

On 14 July 1944 at the Lvov-Sandomierz Offensive, Tokarev pierced the Koltov Corridor and his tank was among the first to penetrate Zolochiv. His crew then participated in clearing the defenses around Brody and breaching Horodok. At Sudovaya Vishnya, Sergeant Japaridze, while performing his other duties in battle, eliminated over a dozen enemy soldiers with machine gun fire, while contributing to the destruction of six enemy anti-tank gun emplacements. For his actions he received the Order of the Red Star.

On 24 July Tokarev's T-34 was one of the first to cross the Polish border. It took part in the battle to liberate the town Janów Lubelski. Following the capture of Sandomierz on 1 August 1944, as part of 6th Guards Tank Corps, they participated in the subsequent effort to hold and expand the Vistula bridgehead. There Japaridze and his fellow tankers would be confronted with the deployment of the Tiger II heavy tank. Earlier on 12 August when the German force was still advancing towards Staszów and Szydłów, Tokarev's crew liberated the village Mokra, West of Staszów, destroying two enemy APCs and defeating a small infantry detachment in the process. Afterwards friendly soldiers assisted in camouflaging the T-34, when they detected six enemy tanks approaching the settlement. The crew opened fire and set one of them ablaze. The Germans responded by assuming attack formation but another two were destroyed by the combined efforts of Komarichev and Japaridze, so their remaining unit withdrew. Later that evening Tokarev's battalion commander Captain Golomidov introduced a plan to surprise the German heavy armor that was heading towards the Soviet bridgehead. He ordered him and another distinguished crew under the command of lieutenant Krainov, to set up an ambush by Mokra. There the two tanks dug in and camouflaged, so they wouldn't be spotted. The following morning on 13 August an unsuspecting group of 20 German tanks, that included 10 Tiger IIs, appeared from a ravine, trying to bypass the mounds. But by doing so, they exposed their flanks to the entrenched Soviet armor, that waited until their enemy was as close as 500 meters. At that point, the Soviets opened fire. Immediately one of the Tiger IIs was destroyed by Komarichev and Japaridze, while a second knocked out by Krainov's crew. Failing to respond properly due to the difficult terrain, the Germans lost another two Tiger IIs destroyed and two more disabled, to both Soviet tanks, before they decided to retire in orderly fashion. No further attempts were made. On 23 September 1945, for their actions in the war, that particular battle and the destruction of two Tiger II tanks at Mokra, Japaridze and Komarichev were both awarded the title Hero of the Soviet Union, Order of Lenin and gold star medal.

=== Tank commander ===
Following the battles at Sandomierz bridgehead, Japaridze was sent to Lviv to undergo officer courses and after three months of training, was given command over his own T-34, as part of the 52nd Guards Tank Brigade. On 13 January 1945 he and his crew crossed the Nida at the second day of the Vistula–Oder offensive to enter the town Pilica. They then participated in the liberation of Maluszyn and Radomsko, before returning to the Oder to assist Soviet troops that were facing pressure by a superior enemy force at the Opole bridgehead. On 23 January, alongside other tanks, Japaridze's T-34 breached occupied Sławice and rushed to Gliwice straight into the rear of the German forces defending Silesia. For his role in those battles, Japaridze was promoted to Guards lieutenant. On 9 February 1945, as part of his brigade's vanguard, he and his crew crossed the Bóbr and bypassed Bolesławiec, to take part in the battle for Lubań. However, Japaridze's tank was hit twice at the outskirts of the city and he was seriously wounded. Only he and the loader survived.

== Post war life ==
In April 1945, due to poor health, Japaridze was relieved from frontline duty and put in reserve. He returned to Georgia and applied at the Polytechnical Institute in Tbilisi, to become an engineer. Following graduation in 1951, he worked as engineer in a mechanical assembly trust, until his retirement. In 1953 he became member of the CPSU and was also awarded the title Honored Engineer of the Georgian SSR. Tengiz Japaridze died in 1998 and was buried in Tbilisi.
