= Dmitry Vergun =

Dmitriy Vergun (Russian: Дмитрий Николаевич Вергун, Dmitriy Nikolayevich Vergun, Ukrainian: Дмитро Миколайович Вергун, Dmytro Mykolayovych Vergun; 1871–1951) was a publicist, journalist, Russian-language poet, and literary historian from Galicia.

== Biography ==
Born in a town of Horodok, Galicia and Lodomeria, Austria-Hungary, in 1899 Vergun defended his doctoral dissertation "Meletius Smotrytsky as western-Ruthenian writer and grammarian" in Vienna University. Vergun learned his "Russian" (Kyivan recension of Church Slavonic) in the Galician-Ruthenian Elementary also known as "Halytsko-Ruska Matytsia" located in Lemberg (today Lviv). In 1900-1905 he was publishing in Vienna a neo-Slavophillic magazine "Slavianskiy vek". The neo-Slavism in Austria-Hungary were sponsored by Russian aristocracy, particularly Count Vladimir Bobrinskiy who was financing the magazine "Slavianskiy vek". Vergun also was a member of Galician-Russian Charitable Society (1902-1914) that was financed by the Russian Orthodox Church.

Being a subject of Austria-Hungary, yet sympathizing the All-Russian Empire, in 1897 he was arrested. In 1901 in Lemberg Vergun published a collection of poetry in Russian "Red-Ruthenian (Red-Russian) echoes". The Muscovite magazine "Russkaya mysl" (Russian thought) was very a critical of his work and him personally:

The poetry of Mr. Vergun prove nothing of him except lack of talent and knowledge of the "All-Russian literary language" despite that already in 1865 Mr. Dielitskiy demonstrated for a Little-Russian to learn Russian in a single moment. For his “sins of youth,” fate really did not “fall in love” with Mr. Vergun and did not “light a fire to write poetry” ...

Стихи г. Вергуна ничего не доказываютъ, кромъ его бездарности и плохого знания «общерусскаго литературнаго языка», несмотря на то, что еще въ 1865 г. Дѣлицкій показалъ «въ одинъ часъ научится малороссу по русски…». За «грѣхи юности» судьба дѣствительно не «влюбила» г. Вергуна и не «подожгла огня, чтобы писать стихи»…

During the ongoing World War I, in 1915 in Petrograd (today Saint Petersburg) the Aleksey Suvorin association typography (Novoye Vremya) published his book "What is Galicia".

In 1918-1919 Vergun was teaching Slavic philology in Moscow University and Irkutsk University.

Along with Pyotr Gatalak and Dmitriy Markov promoted the idea of Carpathian Russians (Karpatorossy).

Due to the Russian Civil War, 1922-1945 he was teaching Russian language and Slavic Studies in the Prague Higher School. Since 1945 Vergun was a professor at the Houston University.

He died in Houston Texas in 1951.

== Works ==
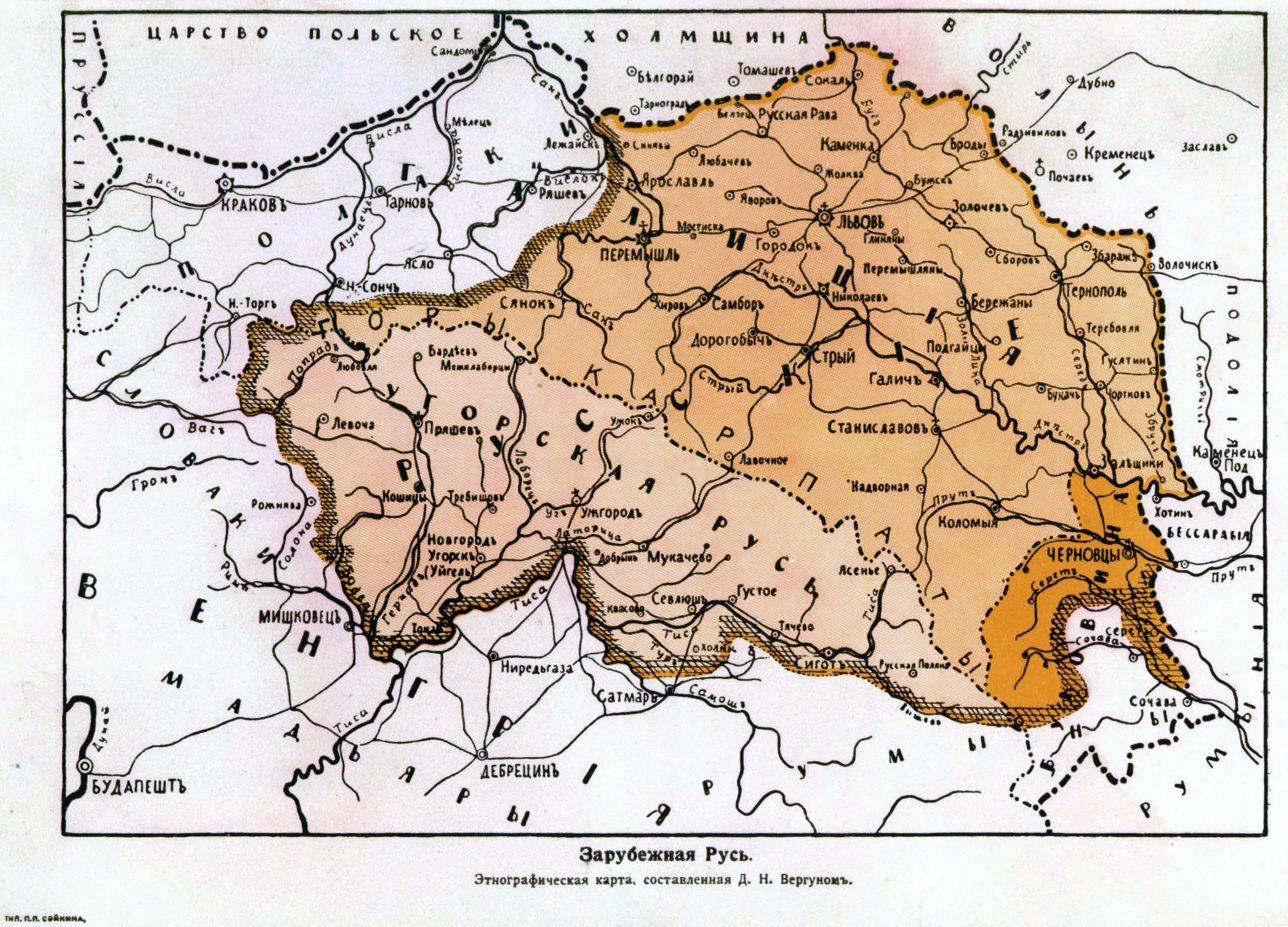
Map of Ruthenian lands in Austria-Hungary

=== Poetry ===
- Slavic bells
- Red Russian echoes. Lemberg, 1901, 1907
- Carpathian echoes. 1920
- Cantata for Gogol

Among his poems used to be successful his "Slavic bells" (Russian: «Славянские звоны»). Many of his poems converted into songs ("Russian Sokol march" by Vojtěch Hlaváč, "Cantata to Gogol" by Arkhangelskiy, "Go ahead, people of the Red Russia!" by Ludmilla Schollar)

=== Literary History ===
- Religious persecutions of Carpathian Russians. Saint Petersburg, 1913
- Yevgeniy A. Fentsik and his place in Russian literature. Uzhhorod, 1926
- Measures of Minister Bachak in suppression of 1849 Carpathian Russian revival with memorandums by Adolf Dobrjanský. Prague, 1938
- Slavic conversations. "Slavic Age", 1900, No. 1, 2, 4
- AI Herzen and the Slavic question. Ibid., 1901, No. 19
- At the crossroads of two cultures: Slavdom from Gdańsk to Trieste. Ibid., 1901, No. 23/24
- Autobiography. In the book: Vergun DN Poems. Lviv, 1901
- Panslavism and pan-Germanism. "Slavic Age", 1903, No. 67, 69, 72
- German "Drang nach Osten" in numbers and facts. Vienna, 1905
- What you need to know about the Slavs. Saint Petersburg, 1908
- Austro-Slavicism and Russo-Slavicism. In the book: Lado. Saint Petersburg, 1911
- Russia and Turkey. Saint Petersburg, 1911
- What is Galicia. Saint Petersburg, 1915
- The latest Carpatho-Russian bibliography. New York, 1920
- Introduction to Slavonic studies. Prague, 1924
- Eight lectures on Subcarpathian Russia. Prague, 1925
- Review of Carpatho-Russian literature. Prague, 1925
- The legend of Fyodor Kuzmich. "Notes of the Russian Historical Society", 1927, vol. 1
- To the historiography of neo-Slavism. In: Proceedings of the IV Congress of Russian Academic Organizations Abroad, Part 1. Belgrade, 1929
- In memory of YA Yavorsky. In: Timeline of the Stauropean Institute for 1938. Lviv, 1938.
