= Nino Nakashidze =

Georgian writer

Nino Nakashidze ნინო ნაკაშიძე
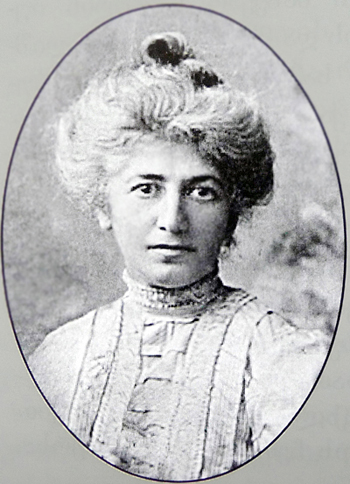
- Portrait of Nakashidze in her signature white hair
- Born: 13 January 1872; Near Ozurgeti, Georgia, Russian Empire
- Died: 2 July 1963 (aged 91); Tbilisi, Georgia, Soviet Union
- Occupations: Writer, revolutionary, activist
- Writing career
- Notable awards: Order of the Red Banner of Labour (7 March 1960)

Nino Nakashidze (also spelled as Nakachidze, Georgian: ნინო ნაკაშიძე; 13 January 1872 — 2 July 1963) was a Georgian writer.

== Biography ==
She was primarily known for her writings involving children and their treatment in what she viewed as a flawed system. She was also a political activist and took part in the Revolution of 1905 and subsequent upheavals, which earned her a brief exile in 1908 to the Vyatka Governorate. It is in this time period that she wrote some of her more somber titles, such as "Execution of Aspiroz"(ასპიროზის დახვრეტ) and a play "Who is Guilty"(ვინ არის დამნაშავე).

== See also ==
- Nakashidze
