= Svetlana Sukhishvili =

Polymer scientist

Svetlana A. Sukhishvili is a polymer scientist known for her research on multilayer polymer laminates with tunable material properties, on artificial skin that can release and re-absorb antibiotics in response to different stimuli, and on self-healing Diels–Alder polymer films that can protect spacecraft and military equipment against high-velocity particles. Educated in Russia, she works in the United States as a professor in the Texas A&M University Department of Materials Science and Engineering, and as director of the university's Soft Matter Facility.

== Education and career ==
Sukhishvili studied polymer chemistry at Moscow State University, where she received a bachelor's degree in 1984 and completed a doctorate in 1989. She continued working at Moscow State as a research fellow and assistant professor until 1996.

In 1996, she moved to the United States and began working at the University of Illinois Urbana-Champaign, as a visiting scholar and research associate. In 2000 she joined the Stevens Institute of Technology as an associate professor without tenure in the Department of Chemistry and Chemical Biology. She was given tenure there in 2004 and promoted to full professor in the Department of Chemistry, Biological and Biomedical Engineering in 2008.

In 2015 she moved to her present position at Texas A&M University.

== Recognition ==
Sukhishvili was named as a Fellow of the American Physical Society (APS) in 2007, after a nomination from the APS Division of Polymer Physics, "for fundamental contributions to the science of polymer monolayers and multilayers adsorbed at water/solid interface, and for understanding the correlations of polymeric self-assembly in solutions and at surfaces".
