= Zakhar Khitalishvili =

WWII-Soviet fighter ace

- Born: 22 August 1922; Aranisi, Georgian SSR
- Died: 21 October 1986 (aged 64); Tbilisi, Georgian SSR
- Military career
- Allegiance: Soviet Union
- Branch: Soviet Air Force
- Service years: 1940 – 1986
- Rank: Captain
- Unit: 232nd Assault Aviation Regiment
- Conflicts: World War II; Battle of Moscow; Battle of Stalingrad; Battle of Sevastopol; Baltic offensive
- Awards: Hero of the Soviet Union

Zakhar (Zakhari) Khitalishvili (Georgian: ზაქარია ხიტალიშვილი, Zakaria Khitalishvili Russian: Захар Соломонович Хиталишвили, Zakhar Solomonovich Khitalishvili; (Note: Sometimes spelled as Shakro Khitalishvili) 22 August 1922 – 21 October 1986) was a Georgian-Soviet fighter ace who served in World War II.

== Early life ==
Zakhar Khitalishvili was born in the village Aranisi of the Georgian Soviet Socialist Republic, into a family of farmers. He graduated after the 7th class and subsequently from the Tbilisi flight club. He went on to join the Red Army in 1940, where he would visit the Kirovabad Military Aviation School of Pilots.

== World War II ==
Khitalishvili entered the war in June 1941. Shortly after during an air battle, his Il-2 was engaged by two German Me 109s and hit. Badly wounded, he managed to land the damaged aircraft on its belly, inside Kotelva Raion, Ukraine. Khitalishvili evaded capture because he was saved and hidden by locals who nursed him back to health. One of them was later murdered by the Nazis for helping him. He then linked up with his regiment to participate in the Battle of Moscow. A year later Khitalishvili would become part of the Communist Party. In late 1943 he became squadron commander of the 232nd Assault Aviation Regiment, then part of the 8th Air Army. By that time he had completed 106 combat sorties, during which he personally downed 29 enemy aircraft, destroyed 69 tanks, 31 armored vehicles and a number of other ground equipment. On 13 April 1944, for exemplary performance in combat, courage and heroism, Captain Zakhar Khitalishvili was awarded the title Hero of the Soviet Union by the Presidium of the Supreme Soviet of the USSR.

== Post war ==
When the war ended, Khitalishvili continued to serve in the Soviet Air Forces. He graduated from the Higher Advanced Training Courses for Air Force Officers in 1947 and from 1957 onwards, served in reserve capacity. He spent the rest of his life and career in Tbilisi. Zakhar Khitalishvili died on 21 October 1986.
