= Chichiko Bendeliani =

Soviet flying ace (1913–1944)

- Born: 28 December 1918; Chokhatauri, Russian Empire
- Died: 20 July 1944 (aged 25); Kovel Raion, USSR
- Military career
- Allegiance: Soviet Union
- Branch: Soviet Air Forces
- Service years: 1935–1944
- Rank: Major
- Unit: 431st Fighter Aviation Regiment
- Conflicts: World War II; Eastern Front; Battle of Stalingrad; Battle of Kursk
- Awards: Hero of the Soviet Union

Chichiko Kaisarovich Bendeliani (Georgian: ჭიჭიკო ყაისარის ძე ბენდელიანი, Russian: Чичико Кайсарович Бенделиани; 29 January 1913, born in Chokhatauri, Russian Empire – 20 July 1944) was a Soviet fighter pilot and Hero of the Soviet Union. He fought in the Great Patriotic War and became a fighter ace with 12 solo and 20 shared victories.

== Early life ==
Bendeliani was born into a Georgian peasant family in the settlement of Chokhatauri, Georgia, then part of the Russian Empire. He finished school after the 7th grade and went to an Agricultural college which he graduated in 1933. He worked as a freight forwarder and studied in a flying club in Tbilisi.

== Military service ==
On 8 September 1935, he enrolled in the Soviet military and two years later graduated from the Kacha Higher Military Aviation School of Pilots. He began his service as flight commander of 5th Squadron, 43rd Fighter Aviation Regiment and was the youngest fighter pilot in the Soviet airforce.

His first air victory occurred over Kiev at the opening of the Eastern Front, when he shot down a German bomber aircraft. In July 1941 Bendeliani became lieutenant and was acting commander of his regiment, then part of the Soviet 21st Army deployed to the South Western Front. Part of a quartet of fighters he got engaged in a dogfight with German Messerschmitts escorting bombers that were trying to bomb a crossing. Bendeliani spent up all his ammunition and then decided to ram one of the Bf 109 which plummeted to the ground when one of its wings got cut off by the collision. He parachuted from his own fighter and landed safely on Soviet territory.

The lieutenant continued air sorties over Stalingrad covering ground forces crossing the Don River. He consistently escorted fighter and bomber groups and taught other pilots air combat techniques. At that point, Bendeliani had shot down five enemy aircraft.

During the Battle of Kursk he held the rank of major and was deputy commander of the 54th Guards Fighter Aviation Regiment of the 6th Air Army, 1st Belorussian Front. He had made 385 air missions by then, out of which 75 were air battles with 7 personal and 12 pair victories. For his actions he was awarded Hero of the Soviet Union.

== Last mission ==
In July 1944, Bendeliani led a pair of Soviet P-39 fighters in support of a ground assault when they got attacked by six German Fw 190. The ensuing dogfight became long and fierce. The major managed to shoot down one Focke-Wulf and knock out a second. When noticing a new pair of German fighters appear trying to raid the withdrawing Soviet troops, Bendeliani turned around and moved to engage those, downing both enemy aircraft. However, when he was about to make another combat turn, the Russian pair came under heavy fire from the remaining Focke-Wulf quartet in pursuit, and Bendeliani got mortally wounded.

The major was able to maneuver his plane into friendly territory and land it safely. He died in the hands of the Soviet infantrymen who got him out of his Airacobra.
