= Lavrenty Avaliani =

Soviet sergeant (1923–1943)

Lavrenty Ivanovich Avaliani
- Лаврентий Иванович Авалиани
- Born: 6 November 1923; Gumati, Kutais Uyezd, Transcaucasian SFSR, Soviet Union
- Died: 10 October 1943 (aged 19); Kanadsky, Mykhailivka Raion, Ukrainian SSR
- Military career
- Allegiance: Soviet Union
- Branch: Infantry
- Service years: 1941–1943
- Rank: Sergeant
- Conflicts: Second World War
- Awards: Hero of the Soviet Union; Order of Lenin; Order of the Red Banner; Medal "For Courage"

Lavrenty Ivanovich Avaliani (Russian: Лаврентий Иванович Авалиани, Georgian: ლავრენტი ივანეს ძე ავალიანი; 6 November 1923 - 10 October 1943) was a Soviet soldier who saw action in the Second World War, known in the Soviet Union as the Great Patriotic War. He reached the rank of sergeant and commanded a squad of the 1372nd Infantry Regiment of the 417th Rifle Division of the 44th Army of the Southern Front. He was posthumously awarded the title of Hero of the Soviet Union in 1943.

== Biography ==
Avaliani was born on 6 November 1923 in the village of Gumati, in the Socialist Soviet Republic of Georgia. He was Georgian by nationality. After graduating from five classes, he worked on a collective farm, and was a member of the Komsomol.

On 4 April 1943 he was called up for service in the Red Army. From 17 April he was in the army (according to other sources, since 1941 and received three wounds this year). He fought on the North Caucasian and Southern Fronts in the 1372nd Infantry Regiment of the 417th Rifle Division.

On 3 June 1943, as a squad leader with the rank of sergeant, Avaliani made a single sortie over the front line and destroyed an enemy machine gun crew with light machine gun fire. On 28 July by order of the regiment commander, he was awarded the medal "For Courage". On 10 August, during the battle for the Gornovesely farm (Krasnodar Krai), Avaliani, repelling an enemy attack, killed more than 20 German soldiers, including two officers, with machine-gun fire. At the end of the attack, at the request of his wounded colleagues, the sergeant crawled for water to a spring in the neutral zone, repelled an attempt to capture him, killing two more enemy soldiers with automatic fire, and returned with water to the location of his detachment. The next day, already on the offensive, he used machine gun fire to kill enemy soldiers advancing on his squad and remained in the ranks despite being wounded. On 8 September, by order of the commander of the 56th Army, he was awarded the Order of the Red Banner.

In October 1943, the detachment of Lavrenty Avaliani took part in the battles in the Zaporozhye Oblast. During the offensive on 9 October, near Kanadsky (Mikhailovka Raion), Avaliani, breaking into the enemy trench, entered into hand-to-hand combat, during which he killed 18 enemy soldiers. The next day, his squad fought defensive battles with infantry and armored vehicles of the enemy, who was trying to regain lost positions.

Lavrenty Avaliani died in this battle. By decree of the Presidium of the Supreme Soviet of the USSR on 1 November 1943, he was posthumously awarded the title Hero of the Soviet Union. Avaliani was buried in a mass grave in the village of Novolyubimovka (Tokmak Raion, Zaporozhye Oblast).

From the award list:

... Avagliani, with his anti-tank rifle and light machine gun, did not allow the enemy to move forward. ... Avagliani, with his anti-tank rifle and hand grenades, knocked out 3 enemy tanks, of which one of the Tiger type, killed up to 150 Nazis from a light machine gun, when the last time the enemy, with the support of tanks, launched a counterattack by a group of machine gunners, Comrade Avagliani immediately took a gun and knocked out with several shots 1 medium tank, but at that time a heavy tank of the "Tiger" type was advancing on it. [Avaliani] let the ["Tiger"] to 40-45 meters and blinded the tank with shots from the anti-tank rifle, and then destroyed it with several anti-tank grenades and opened heavy fire at close range on enemy infantry, and when the cartridges ran out, with a Finnish knife in hand, he rushed at the surviving Nazis, killing another 12 Nazis.

== Awards ==
- Medal "Gold Star" of the Hero of the Soviet Union (1 November 1943)
- Order of Lenin (1 November 1943)
- Order of the Red Banner (8 September 1943)
- Medal "For Courage" (28 July 1943)
- Medals

== Sources ==
- Герои Советского Союза: Краткий биографический словарь / Пред. ред. коллегии И. Н. Шкадов. — М.: Воениздат, 1987. — Т. 1 /Абаев — Любичев/. — 911 с. — 100 000 экз. — ISBN отс., Рег. No. в РКП 87-95382
