= Vladimer Papidze =

- ვლადიმერ პაპიძე
- Born: 14 September 1900; Kveda Usakhela, Georgian SSR
- Died: 14 November 1975 (aged 75); Kveda Usakhela, Georgian SSR
- Military career
- Allegiance: Soviet Union
- Branch: Red Army
- Service years: 1942–1945
- Unit: 1371st Rifle Regiment
- Conflicts: World War II; Transcaucasian Front; North Caucasian Front; 4th Ukrainian Front
- Awards: Hero of the Soviet Union

Vladimer Papidze (Georgian: ვლადიმერ პაპიძე, Russian: Владимир Иванович Папидзе, Vladimir Ivanovich Papidze; 14 September 1900 – 14 November 1975) was a Soviet soldier who fought in World War II and Hero of the Soviet Union.

== Early life ==
Papidze was born on 14 September 1900 in the village Kveda Usakhela of Chiatura Municipality, Georgian SSR, into a peasant family. He went through secondary education and in March 1942 was drafted by the regional commissariat, to serve in the Soviet military.

== World War II ==
Papidze joined the war in August 1942 as infantryman of his regiment's 3rd Rifle Company. On 29 September 1943 during a critical episode of battles at the Kuban bridgehead, under enemy machine gun fire, he negotiated a barbed wire obstacle in order to clear a path for his unit and in the process managed to disable 35 anti-personnel mines. At the subsequent assault on Mount Girlyannaya he was the first Soviet soldier to storm the trenches. In the ensuing close-quarters battle, Papidze was able to kill 7 enemy soldiers, including an officer. Despite being wounded, he kept participating in the assault until its conclusion. For that action, Papidze was awarded the Order of the Red Star. From December 1943 to January 1944 he was part of Soviet landing forces during the Kerch–Eltigen operation. On 23 January his unit was pinned down by pillboxes. Taking initiative, Papidze crawled towards the enemy positions and while standing up, threw two anti-tank grenades into the embrasures, eliminating six enemy soldiers, including a non-commissioned officer. Exploiting the chaos, he immediately breached the trench and found himself in a hand-to-hand struggle with an enemy machine gunner. He managed to take out him, as well as another soldier who moved to their aid. Picking up the captured machine gun, Papidze proceeded to clear the trench, killing a further 16 enemy soldiers, which enabled the advance of his company. From April to May 1944 Papidze took part in the Crimean offensive. On May 7 during an assault on a strongpoint at a farmstead, he once again took initiative, crawled up to the pillbox that was suppressing his company and destroyed it, killing four enemy soldiers. Because of that action, his unit was able to flank and take the farmstead, destroying an enemy company in the process. That breakthrough allowed them and other companies of the 1371st Rifle Regiment to attack further and capture the next enemy strongpoint. During the fighting Papidze was the first to breach State Farm No. 10. While doing so, he reportedly shouted "For Stalin, for the Motherland!" and afterwards raised the Soviet flag on top of its ruins. On March 25, 1945 for exemplary performance, courage and heroism on the front, Vladimer Papidze was awarded the title Hero of the Soviet Union, with Order of Lenin and gold star medal.

== Post war life ==
Following demobilization at the end of the war, Papidze returned to his native village in Georgia. There he worked on a collective farm and was awarded the Order of the Red Banner of Labor for achievements in labor. Vladimer Papidze died on 14 November 1975 in Kveda Usakheli, Georgia.
