= Holy Transfiguration Monastery Church, Mingul =

Monastery church in Mingul, Albania

Holy Transfiguration Monastery Church
- Kisha e Manastirit të Shpërfytyrimit (Albanian)
- Interactive map of Holy Transfiguration Monastery Church
- 40.136361°N 20.167306°E
- Location: Mingul

Cultural Monument of Albania

The Holy Transfiguration Monastery Church (Albanian: Kisha e Manastirit të Shpërfytyrimit) is a monastery church in Mingul, Gjirokastër County, Albania. It is a Cultural Monument of Albania.
