= Holy Transfiguration Monastery, Horodok, Ukraine =

Greek Catholic monastery

Holy Transfiguration Monastery
- Свято-Преображенський монастир
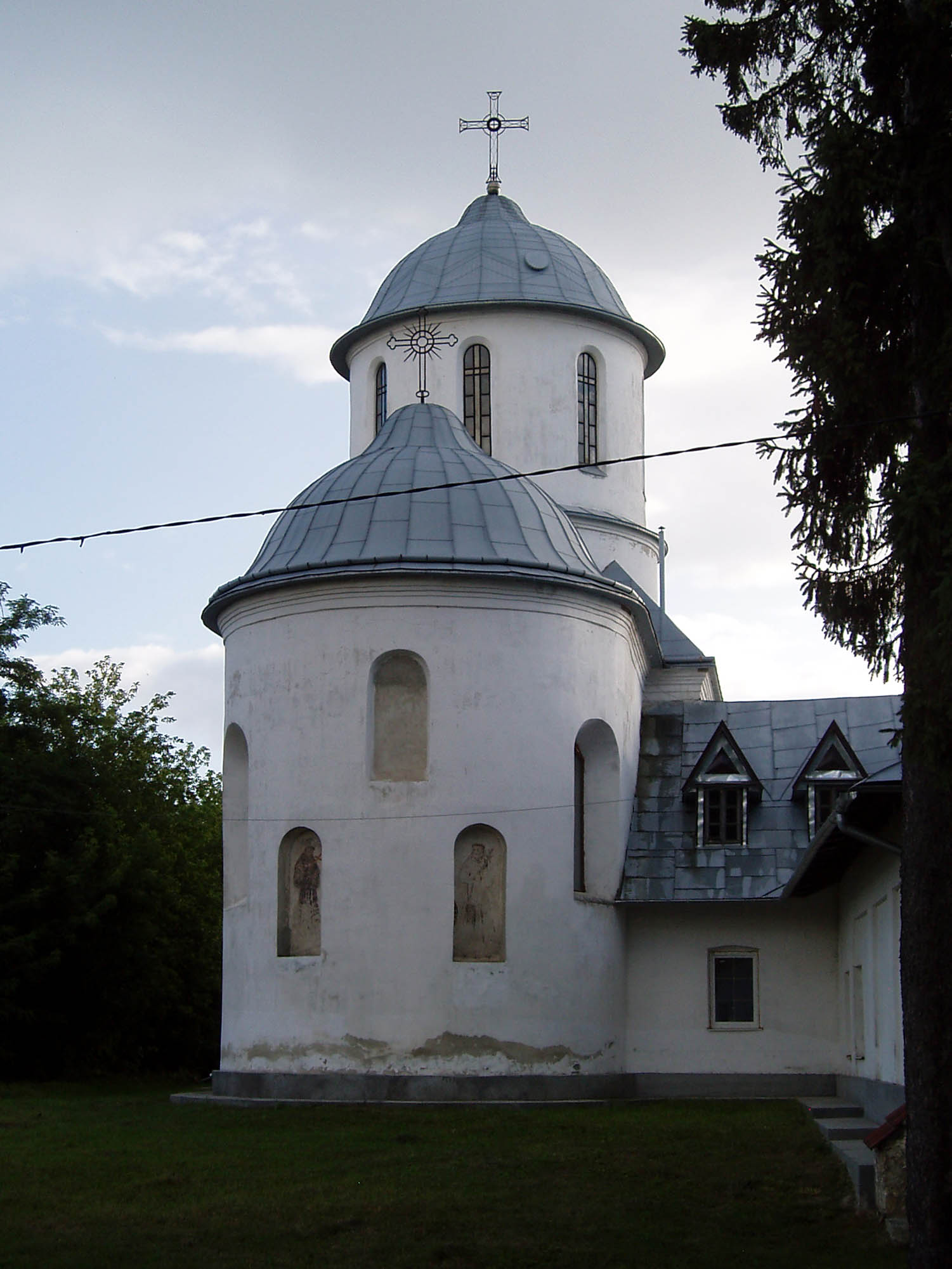

- Location within Lviv Oblast Location within Ukraine
- Interactive map of Holy Transfiguration Monastery

Monastery information
- Order: Studites
- Denomination: Ukrainian Greek Catholic
- Diocese: Stryi

Site
- Location: Horodok
- Country: Ukraine
- Coordinates: 49°47′07″N 23°38′38″E

The Holy Transfiguration Monastery (Ukrainian: Свято-Преображенський монастир, romanized: Sviato-Preobrazhenskyi monastyr) is a Ukrainian Greek Catholic Studite monastery in the town of Horodok, Lviv Oblast, Ukraine. Located on the area of the ancient settlement of town's historical origin, the monastery's buildings arose as a result of reconstruction of the former military barracks located in the abandoned 15th-century Franciscan monastery.

== Origin ==
According to historic sources site was occupied by sacred buildings from time of Principality of Halych. Archaeological excavations and analysis of brickwork confirmed existence of the church from Kievan Rus' time. After the annexation of the lands of the Galician principality by the Polish kings, buildings of the ancient church passed to the Franciscan order. Over time, considering the small number of Roman Catholics and economic problems, the monastery fell into decline. After the inclusion of Galicia in the Austrian Empire, the monastery was liquidated, and in 1880s, the buildings were transferred to the military. Since then, they have been used as cavalry barracks.

== Re-establishment ==
In 1996 the Studite Brethren began the restoration work. Buildings that were in a state of serious disrepair were rebuilt. The ancient portions of the original temple were discovered, and the later stages of its reconstruction by the Franciscans were researched. The team led by architect M. Rybenchuk created two reconstruction projects. A project that was implemented provided a reproduction of ancient Rus' imagery based on one of the temples from Pereiaslav. A cylindrical drum was built, reinforced structures and arranged iron-concrete floors over residential buildings. Construction lasted from 1997 to 2002.
