= Georgi Sakhvadze =

Russian footballer and coach

Personal information
- Full name: Georgi Robertovich Sakhvadze
- Date of birth: 20 August 1985 (age 41)
- Height: 1.83 m (6 ft 0 in)
- Position: Defender

Team information
- Current team: FC Arsenal Tula (assistant coach)

Youth career
- DYuSSh-6 Lazarevskoye

Senior career*
Years	Team	Apps	(Gls)
2002	FC Spartak Anapa	0	(0)
2003–2004	FC Avangard Lazarevskoye		
2005	FC Spartak-UGP Anapa	19	(0)
2006–2008	FC Mashuk-KMV Pyatigorsk	109	(4)
2009–2010	FC Dynamo Saint Petersburg	41	(2)
2010–2011	FC Sheksna Cherepovets	37	(2)
2012–2013	FC Spartak Kostroma	29	(3)
2013–2014	FC Zvezda Ryazan	29	(0)
2017	FC Trud Tikhoretsk		

Managerial career
- 2014–2017: FC Krasnodar (academy)
- 2019: FC Krasnodar (U19 assistant)
- 2019–2021: FC Krasnodar-3 (assistant)
- 2021–2022: FC Krasnodar-2 (assistant)
- 2022–2023: FC Krasnodar (assistant)
- 2023: FC Krasnodar-2 (assistant)
- 2023–: FC Arsenal Tula (assistant)
- * Club domestic league appearances and goals

Georgi Robertovich Sakhvadze (Russian: Георгий Робертович Сахвадзе; born 20 August 1985) is a Russian professional football coach and a former player who is an assistant coach with FC Arsenal Tula.

== Club career ==
He played 4 seasons in the Russian Football National League for FC Mashuk-KMV Pyatigorsk and FC Dynamo Saint Petersburg.
