= Otar Kushanashvili =

Georgian and Russian music journalist and broadcaster

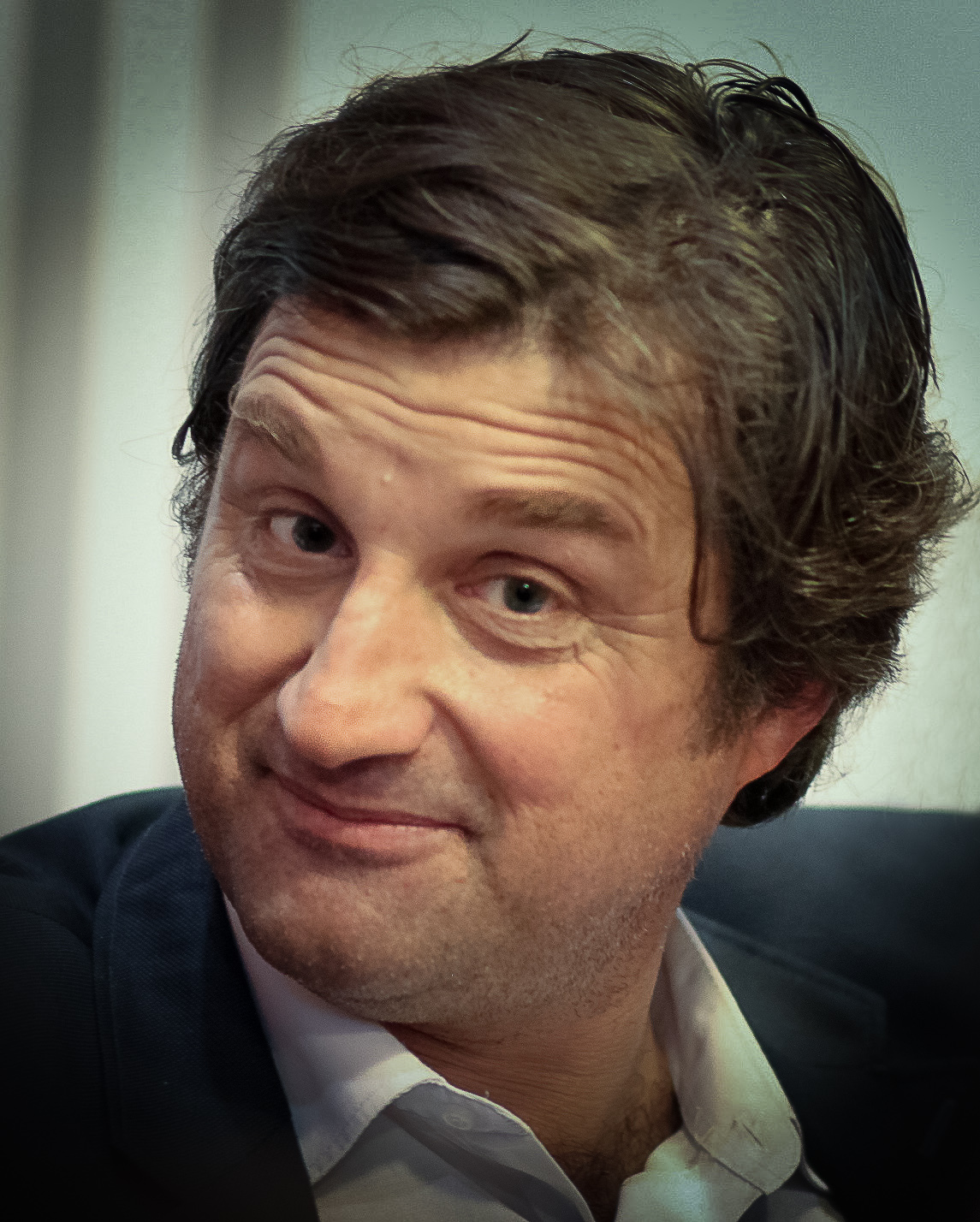
Otar Kushanashvili in 2011

Otar Shalvovich Kushanashvili (Russian: Ота́р Ша́лвович Кушанашви́ли; born 22 June 1970, Kutaisi) is a Georgian and Russian music journalist and broadcaster who describes himself as "anti-publicist". He is known for his provocative and outrageous antics.

In 2004, during a match between Russia and Portugal in the Euro 2004 Championship, Kushanashvili ran onto the field to protest the removal of the game goalkeeper Sergei Ovchinnikov. During the run to the judge he was fined €2,500 and sentenced to two years' probation.

== Personal life ==
First wife Maria Kushanashvili (nee Gorokhova), lawyer. After the divorce, she sued Otar for all the property. Daughter Daria, two sons Georgy and Nikolos live with their mother in Kyiv.

Second wife Irina Kiseleva-Kushanashvili (2004-2009), lawyer at the bank. Daughter Elina and son Fydor.

His common-law wife, Olga Kurochkina, is an entrepreneur. Sons Mamuka (2009) and Roman (2016), daughter Elena.

On June 20, 2024, Kushanashvili was hospitalized in Krasnogorsk. According to his relatives, a few days ago the journalist began to complain of severe pain in the heart and abdomen. He independently went to the clinic for examination, where the TV presenter was given a preliminary diagnosis of cirrhosis of the liver. On July 4, 2024, he announced that he was undergoing treatment for cancer.
