= Vladimer Chkhaidze =

- Born: 14 March 1922; Kursk, Ukrainian SSR
- Died: 7 October 1943 (aged 21); Kursk, Ukrainian SSR
- Military career
- Allegiance: Soviet Union
- Branch: Red Army
- Service years: 1941 – 1943
- Rank: Junior lieutenant
- Unit: 586th tank battalion
- Conflicts: World War II; Battle of Dnieper
- Awards: Hero of the Soviet Union

Vladimer Chkhaidze (Georgian: ვლადიმერ ჩხაიძე, Vladimer Chkhaidze Russian: Владимир Михайлович Чхаидзе, Vladimir Mikhailovich Chkhaidze; 14 March 1922 – 7 October 1943) was a Georgian-Soviet tank commander who served in World War II and was awarded the title Hero of the Soviet Union.

== Early life ==
Vladimer Chkhaidze was born in Kursk (Note: According to some sources, he was born in Moscow.) into a Georgian working-class family. In August 1941 he was drafted into the Soviet military and two years later in 1943, graduated from the Saratov Tank School. He was subsequently deployed to the Steppe Front.

== Battle of the Dnieper ==
On 2 October 1943 Chkaidze and his T-34 were part of the forces from the 586th tank battalion that crossed the Dnieper River at night near Mishurin Rog by pontoon bridge. The crossing was heavily contested but the Soviet battalion managed to gain a foothold and repel successive German counterattacks. Of the 18 enemy tanks and other equipment that were destroyed, Chkaidze personally took out three tanks and several weapon emplacements. The following morning, German forces renewed their efforts and the battle shifted to close quarters. Chkhaidze destroyed another tank at near point blank range, before ramming and disabling a Tiger I. Three days later on 7 October, five German tanks advanced near Chkaidze's position. The lieutenant took initiative and attacked. Surprising the enemy, he was able to destroy two of them, but shortly after his vehicle was hit by return fire and started to burn. However unbeknownst to the Germans, despite heavy damage and wounds the Soviet crew and vehicle remained operational. They unexpectedly started to fire again, knocking out the remaining enemy machines, until another shell hit Chkaidze's tank and it burst into flames, killing the entire crew. On 20 December 1943 for his efforts, including the successful crossing, securing and expanding of the bridgehead, as well as heroic actions, lieutenant Vladimer Chkhaidze was posthumously awarded the title Hero of the Soviet Union.
