= Shota Rostiashvili =

- შოთა როსტიაშვილი
- Born: January 1923; Dzegvi, Georgian SSR, Soviet Union
- Died: 16 February 1945 (aged 22); Zakrzów, Poland
- Military career
- Allegiance: Soviet Union
- Branch: Red Army
- Service years: 1941–1945
- Rank: Sergeant
- Unit: 904th Rifle Regiment
- Commands: Infantry squad
- Conflicts: World War II
- Awards: Hero of the Soviet Union

Shota Rostiashvili (Georgian: შოთა როსტიაშვილი, Russian: Шота Петрович Ростиашвили, Shota Petrovich Rostiashvili; January 1923 – 16 February 1945) was a Soviet soldier and Hero of the Soviet Union, who fought in World War II.

== Early life ==
Shota Rostiashvili was born in January 1923 in the village Dzegvi, Georgian SSR, Soviet Union. He finished high school and did a manufacturing apprenticeship. Following graduation he worked at a shoe factory in Tbilisi. In June 1941 he got drafted into the Soviet military.

== World War II ==
By July 1944 Rostiashvili was serving in the rank of Sergeant and leading a squad of riflemen. He carried a PPSh into battle. At the crossing of the Sinyaya in Latvia on July 18, he was the first to reach the forward trenches, killing three enemy soldiers. As the fighting went on, he and his squad cut off a German company from the crossing and exposed them to the fire of friendly forces. After fording the river, Rostiashvili and his men fought to secure a bridgehead for their battalion. During that period Rostiashvili killed 14 enemy soldiers. Two days later amidst a German counterattack, undetected he and his men breached the enemy trench and destroyed a machine gun position, thwarting their offensive. In that process another two enemy soldiers fell to the Sergeant. For that action and the skillful commanding of his troops, he was awarded the Order of Glory 3rd degree.

On July 21, 1944, during reconnaissance through a forest at Rēzekne, Rostiashvili spotted a group of enemy soldiers on a nearby road and surprised them, taking three POWs, including a radio operator. At night, in the fighting for the station, the Sergeant and his men seized the Yakovlev farmhouse, defeating an enemy platoon and capturing their equipment. After receiving reinforcements, they were able to cross the railway, flank the opposing forces and capture the station. Following the Soviets capture of a nearby town, German troops consolidated and attempted to assault the enemy battalion headquarters in order to round up the Soviets from the rear. At that time, Rostiashvili's squad was deployed at the HQ. Their position came under heavy artillery fire, before the Germans launched their attack with two infantry companies. Ordering his men to resist, Rostiashvili manned a heavy machine gun and started shooting. When he was the only soldier from his squad still alive or able to fight, he took a light machine gun from one of the dead and resumed suppressing and killing the enemy. By that point, they had already advanced up to 80 meters from his position. Rostiashvili began changing position and running across the trench to plug holes. He continued fighting the enemy off at point-blank range and had to toss hand grenades to be able to reload his machine gun, while being subjected to close explosions from enemy hand grenades himself. Unable to overcome the defense and due to heavy losses, the remaining German forces withdrew. In that battle Sergeant Rostiashvili killed 47 enemy soldiers. Some of whom got as close as 12 meters from his position. During the liberation of Latvia, he is credited with having killed a total of 84 enemy soldiers.

== Death ==
In January 1945 Rostiashvili's regiment fought several decisive battles in Poland and took part in the liberation of Kraków and Katowice. On January 30, they arrived at the Oder and started crossing it at Bierawa as part of the 245th Rifle Division. A bridgehead was established near the village Zakrzów, but was heavily challenged and the division suffered great casualties. Among them was Sergeant Rostiashvili, who fell in battle, on 16 February 1945. On 24 March 1945, he was posthumously awarded the title Hero of the Soviet Union and initially buried at Głogówek, but then re-buried at the Bolesławiec military cemetery in Poland.
