= Henri Rukhadze =

Soviet and Russian physicist (1930–2018)

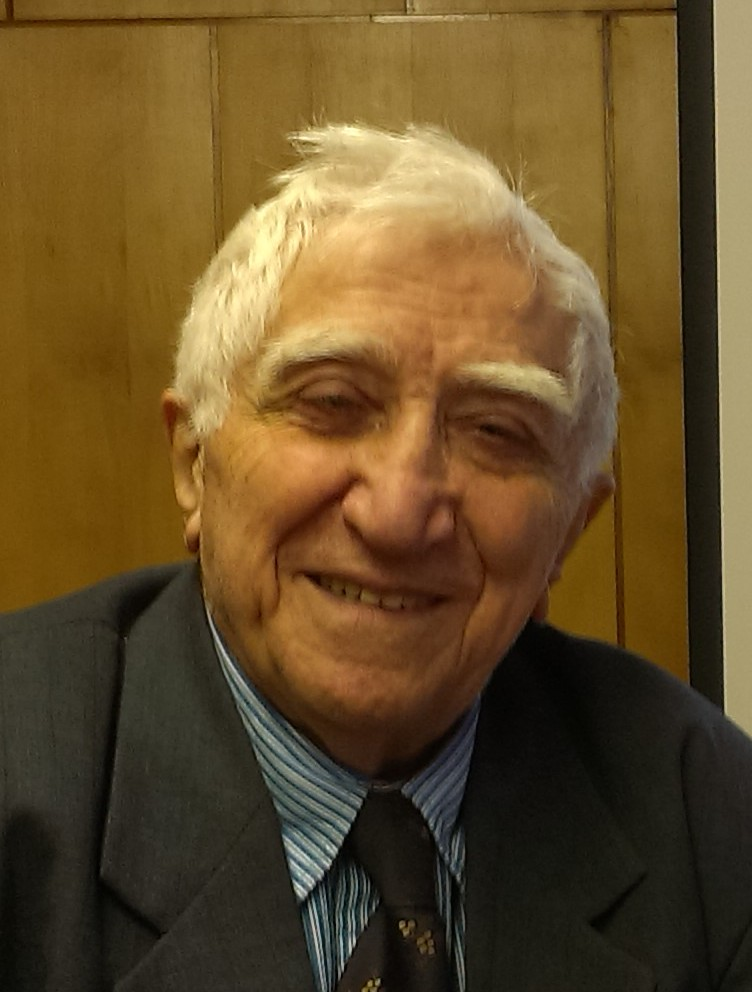
- Born: Henri Amvrosievich Rukhadze; 9 July 1930; Tiflis, Transcaucasian SFSR, Soviet Union
- Died: 7 March 2018 (aged 87); Moscow, Russia
- Education: Moscow Engineering Physics Institute
- Awards: ||
- Scientific career
- Fields: Theoretical physics
- Workplaces: Moscow State University

External image
- Анри Амвросиевич Рухадзе
- Фото

Henri Amvrosievich Rukhadze (Russian: Анри Амвросиевич Рухадзе; 9 July 1930, Tiflis — 7 March 2018, Moscow) was a Soviet and Russian physicist. Doctor of physical and mathematical Sciences, professor, laureate of State Prizes (twice) and M. V. Lomonosov Prize. Author of more than 600 published works, including more than 55 reviews and 14 monographs. He has trained 66 candidates and 32 doctors of sciences. The Hirsch index is 19.

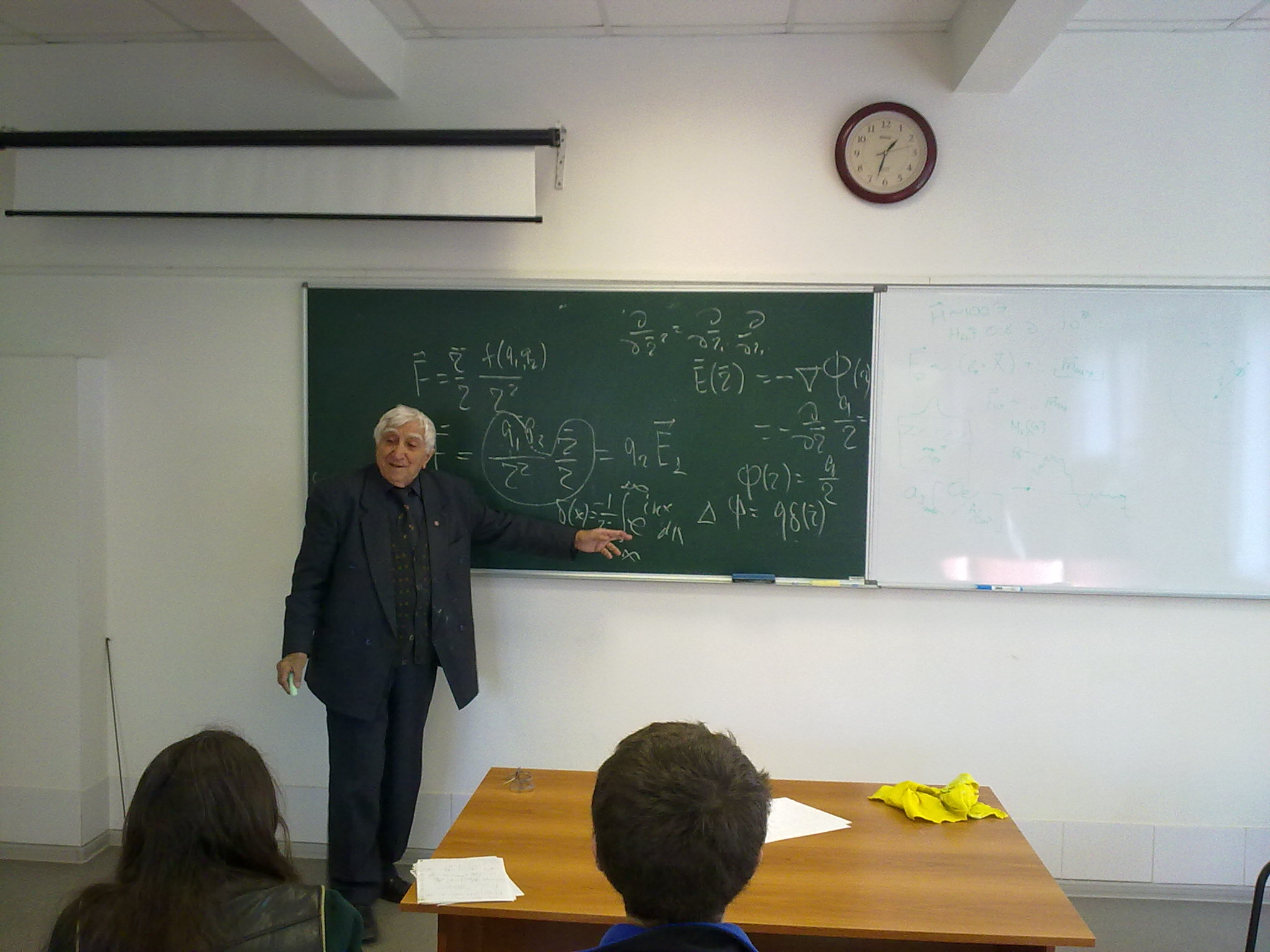
A. A. Rukhadze conducts a class on electrodynamics on October 2, 2014.

== Biography ==
He was born in the family of a mathematical scientist Ambrose Kalistratovich Rukhadze. He received his name in honor of Henri Poincaré (as he himself told at lectures).

He graduated from high school with a gold medal.

In 1948, he entered the Faculty of Physics and Technology of Moscow State University. Due to the abolition of the Faculty of Physics and Technology in 1951, he was transferred to the National Research Nuclear University Moscow Engineering Physics Institute, from which he graduated with honors in 1954. From 1954 to 1957, he was a post-graduate student at Lebedev Physical Institute (scientific supervisor I. E. Tamm). In 1958, he became a candidate of physical and mathematical sciences, in 1964 he defended his doctoral dissertation. Since 1971 - Professor.

Research interests: electrodynamics of material media, plasma physics, kinetic theory of plasma and gases, quantum kinetics, physical electronics, physics of relativistic high-current electron beams.

He was buried at the Khovansky Cemetery.

=== Family ===
- Daughter: Natalia Anrievna Rukhadze, physicist.
- Son: Zurab Anrievich Rukhadze

== Published books ==
- Силин В. П., Рухадзе А. А. Электромагнитные свойства плазмы и плазмоподобных сред. — М: Атомиздат, 1961.
- Гинзбург В. Л., Рухадзе А. А. Волны в магнитоактивной плазме. — М: Наука, 1970, 1975, перевод на англ. язык: Waves in Magnetoplasma, Handbook Elektrophysics v. 49, Heidelberg: Springer Verlag, 1972.
- Александров А. Ф., Рухадзе А. А. Физика сильноточных источников света. — М: Атомиздат, 1976.
- Александров А. Ф., Богданкевич Л. С., Рухадзе А. А. Основы электродинамики плазмы. — М: Высшая школа, 1978, 1988. Перевод на англ. язык: Alexandrov A.F., Bogdankevich L.S., Rukhadze A.A. Principles of Plasma Electrodynamics, Heidelberg: Springer Verlag, 1984.
- Рухадзе А. А. и др. Физика сильноточных электронных пучков. — М: Атомиздат, 1980.
- Ерохин Н. С., Кузелев М. В., Моисеев С. С., Рухадзе А. А. Неравновесные и резонансные процессы в плазменной радиофизике. — М: Наука, 1982.
- Александров А. Ф., Богданкевич Л. С., Рухадзе А. А. Колебания и волны в плазменных средах. — М: Изд. МГУ, 1990.
- Кузелев М. В., Рухадзе А. А. Электродинамика плотных электронных пучков в плазме. — М: Наука, 1990.
- Kuzelev M.V., Rukhadze A.A. Basics of Plasma Free Electron Lasers. Paris: Editions Frontieres, 1995
- Александров А. Ф., Рухадзе А. А. Лекции по электродинамике плазмоподобных сред. — М: Изд. МГУ, 1999.
- Александров А. Ф., Рухадзе А. А. Лекции по электродинамике плазмоподобных сред. Неравновесные среды. — М: Изд. МГУ, 2002.
- Кузелев М. В., Рухадзе А. А., Стрелков П. С. Плазменная релятивистская СВЧ электроника. — М: Изд. МГТУ им. Н. Э. Баумана, 2002.
- Кузелев М. В., Рухадзе А. А., Методы теории волн в средах с дисперсией. — М. Фиэматгиз, 2007, перевод на англ. язык: Methods of Waves Theory in Dispersive Media, World Publisher, Zhurikh, 2009.
- Рухадзе А. А., Игнатов А. М., Гусейн-заде Н. Г. Введение в электродинамику плазмы. — М. Изд. МИРЭА, 2007.

== Awards ==
- Order of the Badge of Honour (1971)
- Order of the Red Banner of Labour (1981)
- Two USSR State Prizes (1981, 1991)
- MGU Lomonosov Prize (1989)
- Honoured Scientist of the Russian Federation (1992)

== See also ==
- Anatoly Kuzovnikov

== Literature ==
- Рухадзе А. А. События и люди — 6 изд., испр. и доп. — М., 2016

=== Articles ===
- Рухадзе А. А. Мифы и реальность. О лучевом оружии в России.(О целях и возможностях их достижений)/ Myths and reality. About beam weapons in Russia.(About the goals and opportunities for their achievement)
- Рухадзе А. А. Недоразумения и недобросовестность в науке. Часть I. Фрагменты истории: ошибки, открытия, реклама и пр./ Misunderstandings and dishonesty in science. Part I. Fragments of history: errors, discoveries, advertising, etc.
- Рухадзе А. А., Самохин А. А. Недоразумения и недобросовестность в науке. Часть II. Люди науки в разрушающемся обществе /Misunderstandings and dishonesty in science. Part II. People of science in a collapsing society
- Рухадзе А. А., Самохин А. А. Недоразумения и недобросовестность в науке. Часть III. Отрицательный индекс/ Misunderstandings and dishonesty in science. Part III. Negative index
- Рухадзе А. А., Уруцкоев Л. И. Всех наук великий цензор, или много шума из ничего /The great censor of all sciences, or much ado about nothing

== Links ==
- Статья на сайте «Летопись Московского университета»
- Анри Амвросьевич Рухадзе // Советский физик. — 2018. — No. 02 (130)
