= Alexander Davidovich Nakashidze =

Georgian nobleman and Russian imperial general

General, nobleman Alexander Davidovich Nakashidze
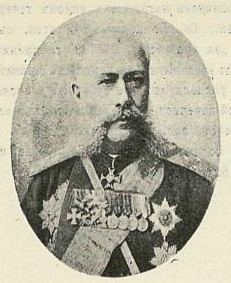
- General Nakashidze
- Born: 1837
- Died: 25 September 1905 (aged 67–68)
- Relatives: Nakashidze
- Military career
- Allegiance: Russian Empire
- Branch: Imperial Russian Army
- Service years: 1853–1905
- Rank: General of the Cavalry
- Units: cavalry, mixed
- Commands: various mixed forces Elisabethpol Governorate
- Conflicts: Caucasian War; Crimean War; Russo-Turkish War; 1877 Chechen-Dagestani insurrection
- Awards: Weapons: Gold Sword for Bravery

Prince Alexander Davidovich Nakashidze (Georgian: ალექსანდრე ნაკაშიძე (Alexandre Nakashidze), Russian: Александр Давидович Накашидзе) (1837 – 25 September 1905) was a Georgian nobleman from the Gurian princely family of Nakashidze and Russian imperial general, who was responsible for several decisive victories against rebellious factions during the Caucasian War. He also participated in the Crimean and Russo-Turkish War of 1877. His son Mikhail Alexandrovich Nakashidze designed one of the world's first armoured cars that would enter military service, in Russia respectively and during the Russo-Japanese War.

== Awards ==
Three times Order of Saint Vladimir
Order of the White Eagle
Two times Order of Saint Anna
Three times Order of Saint Stanislaus
Two times Cross of St. George
Two times Order of the Lion and the Sun (Grand Cross Chevalier & Commander)
