= Pavel Kaskarov =

Physicist

- Born: Pavel Konstantinovich Kaskarov; 5 June 1947; Moscow, RSFSR, Soviet Union
- Education: Moscow State University
- Scientific career
- Fields: Applied physics
- Workplaces: Moscow State University

Pavel Kaskarov (June 5, 1947, Moscow, RSFSR, Soviet Union born) — was a Soviet and Russian physicist. Doctor of physical and mathematical Sciences, honored Professor of Moscow state University. Head of the Department of General physics for the faculty of chemistry/General physics and molecular electronics

Research interests: physics of surface phenomena in semiconductors. H-Index - 23.

== Biography ==
P. Kashkarov was born on June 5, 1947, in Moscow.

In 1971 he graduated from the physics Department of Moscow State University. In 1975 he defended his thesis for the degree of candidate of physical and mathematical Sciences.

In 1980–1981, he completed an internship at the Massachusetts Institute of Technology (Cambridge, Massachusetts, USA).

In 1990, he defended his thesis for the degree of doctor of physical and mathematical Sciences.

Prepared 20 candidates of science.

== Publications ==
He has published 329 scientific papers in domestic and foreign journals.

== Awards ==
- Order of Alexander Nevsky
- Medal of the Order "For Merit to the Fatherland", 2 degrees

== Links ==
- "Кашкаров Павел Константинович". Летопись Московского университета. Archived from the original on 2020-01-17.
- ФНБИК 2015
- Декан факультета НБИК МФТИ П. К. Кашкаров о среднем и высшем образовании в России on YouTube
- Павел Константинович Кашкаров (К 60-летию со дня рождения), Кристаллография, 2007, том 52, № 4, с. 782-783
