= Grodek =

Poem by Georg Trakl

"Grodek" is a 1914 poem about World War I written by Georg Trakl, an Austrian Expressionist poet. It was one of his last poems, if not his very last poem.

== Historical background ==
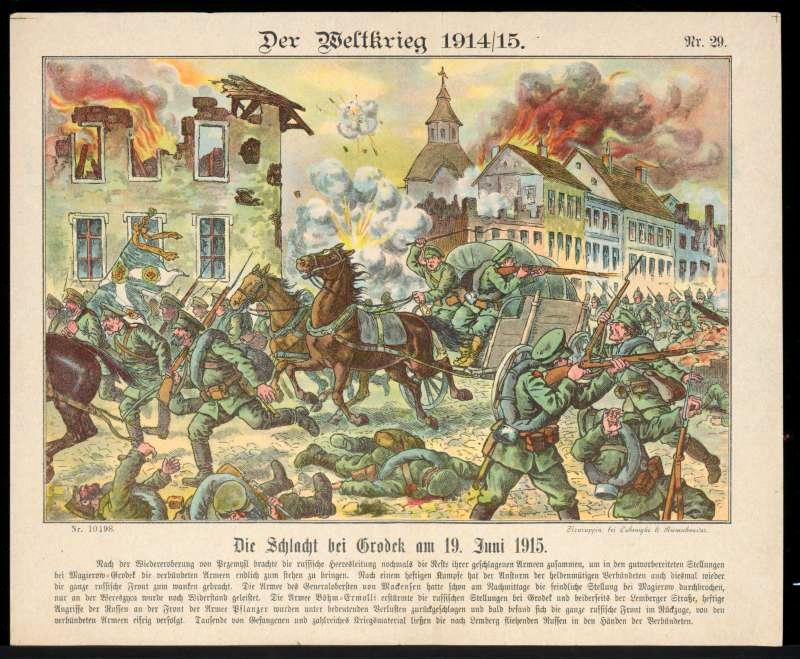
1915 illustration of the battle

Georg Trakl enlisted in the Austro-Hungarian army as a medic in 1914 at the beginning of World War I. He personally witnessed the carnage of the Battle of Gródek (fought at Horodek, then in the Kingdom of Galicia and Lodomeria), in which the Austro-Hungarian army suffered a bloody defeat at the hands of the Russians. One evening following the battle he ran outside and attempted to shoot himself to avoid the cries of the wounded and dying; he was prevented from doing so and was sent to a mental hospital. "Grodek" was either his last poem or one of his very last poems. He died of a self-administered overdose of cocaine in the psychiatric ward of a military hospital in Kraków; while it is often assumed that Trakl chose to end his life, it is unclear whether the overdose was intentional or accidental. He was 27 at the time of his death.

== Analysis ==
Grodek

Am Abend tönen die herbstlichen Wälder
von tödlichen Waffen, die goldnen Ebenen
und blauen Seen, darüber die Sonne
düstrer hinrollt; umfängt die Nacht
sterbende Krieger, die wilde Klage
ihrer zerbrochenen Münder.
Doch stille sammelt im Weidengrund
rotes Gewölk, darin ein zürnender Gott wohnt
das vergoßne Blut sich, mondne Kühle;
alle Straßen münden in schwarze Verwesung.
Unter goldenem Gezweig der Nacht und Sternen
es schwankt der Schwester Schatten durch den schweigenden Hain,
zu grüßen die Geister der Helden, die blutenden Häupter;
und leise tönen im Rohr die dunkeln Flöten des Herbstes.
O stolzere Trauer! ihr ehernen Altäre
die heiße Flamme des Geistes nährt heute ein gewaltiger Schmerz,
die ungebornen Enkel.

=== Structure ===
The poem is seventeen lines long. It is divided into two sections which are easily distinguishable from each other; lines 1-14 are a simple description of the horrors of the landscape of battle, while lines 15-17 are a declaration of the meaninglessness of the sacrifice that war requires. The theme of premature death is built into the structure of the poem itself, as lines 1-11 have four stresses, lines 12 through 15 has five or six stresses. This climaxes in line 16, which is the longest in the poem at 17 syllables, and is immediately followed by the shortest line in the poem, at 7 syllables. The abrupt shortening from line 16 to 17 is suggestive of the abrupt death of young men who were in the prime of life and who had so much potential left.

=== Motifs ===
"Grodek" examines the relationship between autumn, which symbolizes the death of nature, and war. The poem juxtaposes the quiet splendor of autumn and the violent sights and sounds of battle. Like many of his poems, the motif of evening appears in "Grodek", as does another common motif of his, silence. Specifically, he uses the image of "broken mouths" (German: zerbrochenen Münder) to represent the muted state of the damned. As in most of his poems, Trakl does not speak of himself in the first person, even though he experienced the battle of Grodek first-hand, causing the poem to be "perhaps be the most impersonal front-line poem ever written". The last line, Die ungebornen Enkel, can either be translated literally as "the unborn grandchildren" or more symbolically as "the unborn generation", the latter of which implies that World War I destroyed an entire future generation.

== Legacy ==
"Grodek" is often considered to be Trakl's most important poem, even though it is also one of the most difficult to understand. It is one of his most popular poems as well, and is one of very few of his poems to deal with a universal human problem rather than his own personal woes and anxieties.
