= Mikhail Alexandrovich Nakashidze =

- Coat of arms of the House of Nakashidze
- Born: 27 August 1873; Moscow, Russian Empire
- Died: 12 August 1906 (aged 32); Saint Petersburg, Russian Empire
- Relatives: Nakashidze
- Military career
- Allegiance: Russian Empire
- Rank: Staff captain
- Conflicts: Russian invasion of Manchuria; Russo-Japanese War
- Other work: Entrepreneur

Prince Mikhail Alexandrovich Nakashidze (Georgian: მიხეილ ალექსანდროვიჩ ნაკაშიძე (mikheil aleksandrovich nakashidze), Russian: Михаил Александрович Накашидзе, (27 August 1873 – 12 August 1906) was a Georgian nobleman, entrepreneur and officer in the Russian Imperial Army, son to prominent Russian general Alexander Davidovich Nakashidze. Mikhail Nakashidze is credited with proposing and designing one of the first armored cars in the world, and arranging its introduction, construction and delivery to the Russian Empire. The "Charron-Nakashidze" was built by the French automobile company Charron, which at the time was co-headed by Nakashidze, who persuaded the Russian general staff to commission their acquisition.

== The first armored car of the Russian Empire ==
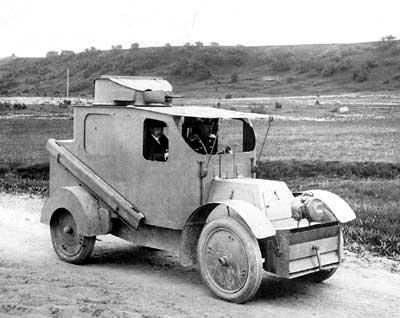
The uparmored Charron-Nakashidze was built in 1905 for the Russian Empire.

Based on his experiences in the Manchurian war, Nakashidze proposed a draft for an armored car design to General Nikolai Linevich of the 1st Manchurian Army. Shortly before the conclusion of the Russo-Japanese War he presented his idea to the Ministry of War of the Russian Empire where Nakashidze's initiative was supported by General Linevich. The idea was approved, however, there was no construction plants that could produce armored vehicles in Russia, which is why design and order were handed over to French company Charron. Prince Nakashidze was the co-owner of Charron, a position he probably used to lobby the company's interests in Russia. Charron had already constructed an armored car, the Charron, Girardot et Voigt in 1902. The same vehicle was the basis for a more combat effective and uparmoured variant designed by Nakashidze in 1905, which was finished the same year, referred to as "Charron-Nakashidze". The original construction order of 36 cars was initially reduced to one experimental prototype for field testing in Russia. The overall impressions were positive. The vehicle had a high ground clearance, armoured wheel disks, a portable bridging device to negotiate obstacles such as trenches, revolving turret with one machine gun mounted and another in reserve, and was clad in 4–5 mm thick armour. All trials had a generally favourable outcome and the commissions concluded that the vehicle had great value for reconnaissance behind enemy lines, as well as communication, and anti-cavalry operations. A total of eight Charron-Nakashidze's were constructed for the Russian army. The French kept two vehicles.

== Death ==
On 12 August Prince Nakashidze visited the then Minister of Internal Affairs of the Russian Empire, Pyotr Stolypin to propose an improved version of the Charron, which was upgraded with results and criticism from the field trials taken into account. However, at the reception, he was caught in the blast of an assassination attempt on Stolypin. Nakashidze was found among the 30 dead, and all his documents were lost. No further orders were approved by the Russian War Department. Partially due to this, the Russian army was left with very few armored vehicles at the outbreak of World War I.
