= Viktor Leselidze =

Soviet colonel (1907–1944)

Viktor Nikolaevich Leselidze
- Виктор Николаевич Леселидзе ვიქტორ ლესელიძე
- Born: 7 January 1907; Ozurgeti, Kutais Governorate, Russian Empire
- Died: 28 June 1944 (aged 37); Republic of Karelia, Soviet Union
- Military career
- Allegiance: Soviet Union
- Branch: Red Army
- Service years: 1925–1944
- Rank: lieutenant colonel
- Commands: Artillery battalions 619th mortar regiment, Soviet 7th army
- Conflicts: World War II; Winter War; Continuation War; Vyborg–Petrozavodsk Offensive; Battle of Svir River †
- Awards: Hero of the Soviet Union

Viktor Nikolaevich Leselidze (Russian: Виктор Николаевич Леселидзе, Georgian: ვიქტორ ლესელიძე, Viktor Leselidze) (January 7, 1907 – June 28, 1944), was a Colonel and Hero of the Soviet Union who distinguished himself during a fatal yet successful melee assault against Finnish forces at the Svir River in World War II. He was also the brother of Col.General Konstantin Leselidze who died in the same year.

== Early life ==
Born on 7 January 1907 in Ozurgeti, Viktor Leselidze was raised in a military family, being one of four brothers serving in the Soviet army. His elder brother Konstantin Leselidze was a Colonel General. After graduating from 6th grade he joined the Red Army in 1925 and later in 1929 graduated from the "Transcaucasus Military Artillery School". Afterwards he served in the Leningrad Military District and became member of the CPSU in 1938.

== Military service ==
Leselidze took part in the 1939–40 Soviet-Finnish War and from 1941 consequently in World War II where he would meet his fate. Commanding artillery battalions till 1944, he took command over the 619th mortar regiment of the 7th Soviet Red Army, Karelian Front and provided crucial fire support for the 763rd Infantry Regiment during the Vyborg–Petrozavodsk Offensive close to the city Lod in the Vicinity of Leningrad. Successfully pushing the enemy forces out of the area from 22 to 27 June Colonel Leselidze and his unit participated in destroying hostile defensive lines and paving the way for infantry assaults along Lake Ladoga. However, after the Tuloksa landing Finnish forces were reinforced with reserves and mounted a counterattack pushing the fresh Soviet troops off the shores and advanced very close to the observation post of the 619th mortar regiment posing an imminent threat to the regimental headquarters. On June 28, 1944, cut off from infantry support and surrounded Viktor Leselidze gathered all soldiers he could find at the NP near the village of Vidlitza and commenced a melee attack personally leading the charge with a group of officers. The heavily outnumbered group prevailed in close combat and defeated the Axis troops which scattered over the entire area. Leselidze was killed during the assault. He is claimed to have been shot by a sniper. Only one out of four brothers would survive the war.

== Involvement in war ==
Scene of conflict	Since when	By what time
Soviet-Finnish war of 1939–1940.
Murmansk area of Petsamo	December 1939	March 1940
Great Patriotic War
Leningrad Front: near Luga and Leningrad. Seriously wounded, shell-shocked	July 1941 August 24, 1941	December 1941
Northwestern Front under the Staraya Russa	March 1942	July 1943
Karelian Front	March 1944	June 28, 1944

== Awards ==
For inspiring and exemplary heroism in the face of an overwhelming enemy force, Viktor Nikolaevich Leselidze was posthumously awarded Hero of the Soviet Union and the Order of Lenin on 21 July 1944

== Memory ==
Name of the Lieutenant Colonel Leselidze VN mentioned on the stove Monument to the Heroic Defenders of Leningrad.

== Literature ==
- Герои Советского Союза: Краткий биографический словарь / Пред. ред. коллегии И. Н. Шкадов. — М.: Воениздат, 1987. — Т. 1 /Абаев — Любичев/. — 911 с. — 100 000 экз. — ISBN отс., Рег. No. в РКП 87–95382
- ПАРОЛЬ — «ПОБЕДА!». Воспоминания участников битвы за Ленинград. Составитель — Я. Ф. Потехин. Лениздат. 1969. Воспоминание П. С. Мазеца «На Лужском рубеже».

== Sources ==
- National archives of Georgia Personal fund #1776 of lieutenant colonel V. Leselidze, inventory #1.
