= Konstantin Leselidze =

Soviet colonel general (1903–1944)

Konstantin Nikolaevich Leselidze Константин Николаевич Леселидзе კონსტანტინე ნიკოლოზის ძე ლესელიძე
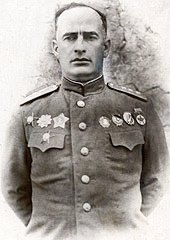
- Born: 15 October 1903; Ozurgeti, Kutais Governorate, Russian Empire
- Died: 21 February 1944 (aged 40); Moscow, USSR
- Military career
- Allegiance: Soviet Union
- Branch: Red Army
- Service years: 1921–1944
- Rank: Colonel General
- Commands: 3rd Mountain Rifle Corps; 46th Army; 47th Army; 18th Army
- Conflicts: Russian Civil War; World War II; Invasion of Poland; Eastern Front
- Awards: Hero of the Soviet Union

Konstantin Nikolaevich Leselidze (Russian: Константин Николаевич Леселидзе, Georgian: კონსტანტინე ლესელიძე, Konstantine Leselidze) (15 October 1903 – 21 February 1944) was a Colonel-General and Hero of the Soviet Union who distinguished himself at the North, Transcaucasus and Ukrainian front during World War II. He was also the elder brother of Viktor Nikolaevich Leselidze

== Early life and career ==
Leselidze was born on 15 October 1903 in Ozurgeti, Georgia (then part of the Russian Empire) to an ordinary employee family. He was the elder brother of another decorated warhero, colonel Victor Leselidze who also died in the same year of the war. In May 1921 after graduating from high school in Tbilisi Leselidze joined the Red Army and was deployed primarily in Georgia. He participated in the suppression of local anti communism movements and uprisings before graduating from the Georgian Joint Military School in 1925 and in 1929 from the Tbilisi Artillery School for advanced officer courses. Leselidze was member of the All-Union Communist Party Bolsheviks already since 1925. During the period of 1922 to 1938 he commanded artillery units from batteries to regiments and the Georgian Joint Military School. In June 1938 he got appointed to chief of artillery, infantry division and was active during the Soviet invasion of Poland in 1939. From February 1941 to the outbreak of hostilities, colonel Leselidze was chief of artillery, rifle corps in the Belorussian Special Military District.

== Eastern Front ==
In the first year of war, colonel Leselidze remained in command of the artillery in the 2nd Infantry Corps and the 50th Army on the Soviet Western Front. In June 1942 he became commander of the 3rd Infantry Corps, 46th Army of the Transcaucasus Front. Only two months later, Leselidze was promoted to major general and given command over the 46th Army, in which he remained until January 1943. From January to March the same year, lieutenant general of the 47th Army and from March to February 1944, commander of the 18th Army in the Transcaucasus, the North Caucasus and the 1st Ukrainian Front as colonel general. The stretching campaigns led him and his forces to the Battle of Moscow, Battle of Caucasus and the recapture of Ukraine, being additionally involved in the Krasnodar, Novorossiysk, Taman, Kerch-Eltigen and Zhitomir-Bordichevskoy defensive operations. The troops under his command fought hard and Leselidze's tactics managed to defend the Caucasus from Wehrmacht takeover, initiating the recapture of the entire area by Soviet forces. His forces did also claim a foothold on the Kerch Peninsula, north-east of Kerch itself.

== Commands Held ==
- 1941-1942: Commanding Officer II Artillery Corps;
- 1942: Commanding Officer Artillery, 50th Army;
- 1942: Commanding Officer III Mountain Rifle Corps;
- 1942-1943 Commanding Officer of the 46th Army;
- 1943: Commanding Officer of the 47th Army;
- 1943-1944: Commanding Officer of the 18th Army;

== Death ==
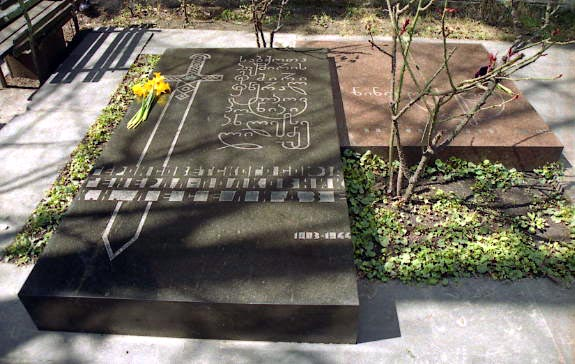
Tombsones of Konstantin Leselidze and his wife Nino Leselidze

From February 1944, Leselidze was treated at central military hospital of the People's Commissariat of Defence of the USSR where he was evacuated from the front for a serious illness after a complication of influenza.

Konstantin Nikolaevich Leselidze died on 21 February 1944 at the age of 40.

On 26 February 1944 he was buried in Tbilisi at the Old Vera cemetery. His grave was later relocated to the Didube Pantheon cemetery on 26 February 1976.

== Honours and awards ==
- Hero of the Soviet Union (1971, posthumously)
- Two Orders of Lenin
- Order of Suvorov, 1st class
- Order of Kutuzov, 1st class
- Order of the Red Banner
- Order of Bogdan Khmelnitsky, 1st class
- Order of the Red Star, twice
- Jubilee Medal "XX Years of the Workers' and Peasants' Red Army"
- Medal "For the Defence of the Caucasus"
- Order of the Red Banner of Labour of the Georgian SSR

From 1944 to 1992, Gyachripsh (a town in Abkhazia) was renamed "Leselidze" after the general. In Tbilisi (the capital of Georgia), a street in the center of the city was named after General Leselidze and a statue of him also stands on this street. Streets were named after him in the cities of Batumi, Sochi, Novorossiysk and Gelendzhik.

== Literature ==
- Советская военная энциклопедия / под ред. Н. В. Огаркова. — М.: Воениздат, 1979. — Т. 4. — 654 с. — (в 8-ми т). — 105 000 экз.
- Великая Отечественная война 1941 — 1945. Энциклопедия / под ред. М. М. Козлова. — М.: Советская энциклопедия, 1985. — С. 408. — 500 000 экз.
- Герои Советского Союза: Краткий биографический словарь / Пред. ред. коллегии И. Н. Шкадов. — М.: Воениздат, 1987. — Т. 1 /Абаев — Любичев/. — 911 с. — 100 000 экз. — ISBN отс., Рег. № в РКП 87-95382
- Коллектив авторов. Великая Отечественная. Командармы. Военный биографический словарь / Под общей ред. М. Г. Вожакина. — М.; Жуковский: Кучково поле, 2005. — С. 128—129. — ISBN 5-86090-113-5

== Sources ==
- National archives of Georgia Personal fund #1777 of Colonel-General K. Leselidze, inventory #1, inventory #2.
- In the building, which is located on this street, during January-February of 1944 housed the headquarters of the 18th Army.
