= Battle of Horodok (1655) =

1655 battle of the Russo-Polish War

Coordinates: 49.7833°N 23.6500°E

- Part of Russo-Polish War (1654–1667)
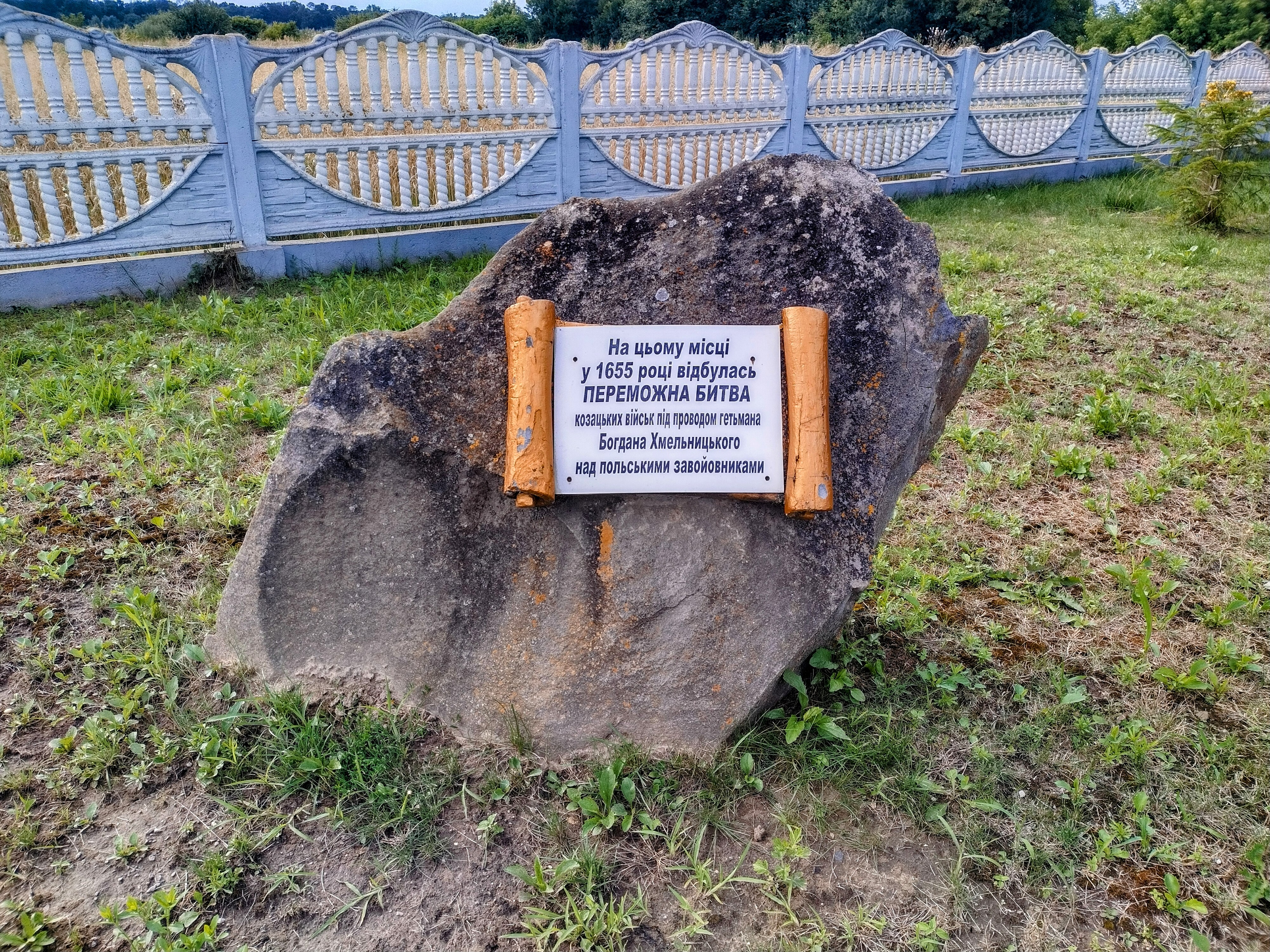
Date	29 September 1655
Location	Horodok, Lviv Oblast, Ukraine
Result	Muscovite–Cossack victory

Belligerents
Polish–Lithuanian Commonwealth	Russian Tsardom; Zaporozhian Cossacks

Commanders and leaders
Stanisław "Rewera" Potocki	Vasily Sheremetev; Bohdan Khmelnytsky

Strength
5,000	8,000

Casualties and losses
1,000 killed, 200 captured	Unknown

The battle of Gródek Jagielloński or battle of Horodok took place during the Russo-Polish War (1654–67) on 29 September 1655. Russian and Ukrainian Cossack forces under Vasily Borisovich Sheremetev and Bohdan Khmelnytsky engaged a Polish–Lithuanian army under Stanisław "Rewera" Potocki near Gródek Jagielloński, which at that time was part of Polish–Lithuanian Commonwealth's Ruthenian Voivodeship (now Horodok, Lviv Oblast, Ukraine). Polish forces were defeated and forced to retreat, losing their supplies to the Russians. The Russians advanced, besieging Lwow, and Potocki with the remains of his army was soon forced to surrender to the invading Swedes.

In August 1655, Russian-Cossack forces moved into Red Ruthenia, which at that time was one of few provinces of the Commonwealth still controlled by Polish forces, as in July of that year, Poland–Lithuania had been invaded by the Swedish Empire. Russian-Cossack forces were faced by a numerically inferior Polish Crown army commanded by Hetman Stanislaw "Rewera" Potocki. The Poles were supported by light Crimean Tatar cavalry, but their forces were inadequate to stop the Russians, and were steadily pushed westwards by the invaders. Near Grodek Jagiellonski Russian cavalry forced their opponent to fight among swamps and ponds.

First Russian charge was repulsed, and Polish cavalry followed the retreating enemy, getting between two columns of Cossack infantry. Hetman Potocki ordered a retreat, which turned into panic. Potocki managed to regain the control of his army, but Russian-Cossack forces were too numerous, and despite desperate resistance, they managed to capture Polish camp, chasing retreating Poles as far as Jaworow.

After the victory, Russians and Cossacks besieged Lwow: to save itself, the city paid an enormous sum of money. The invaders then headed to Lublin, reaching as far west as the Vistula near Pulawy and Kazimierz Dolny. To save his army from complete annihilation, Potocki surrendered to King of Sweden Charles X Gustav, on October 28, 1655.
