= Davit Jabidze =

Soviet military personnel (1916–1982)

Davit Vasiles dze Jabidze
- Born: 23 February 1916; Chkhari, Georgia, then Russian Empire
- Died: 15 December 1982 (aged 66); Tbilisi, Georgian SSR
- Military career
- Allegiance: Soviet Union
- Branch: Soviet Air Force
- Service years: 1940 – 1947
- Rank: Captain
- Units: 158th Fighter Aviation Regiment; 43rd Fighter Aviation Regiment; 812th Fighter Aviation Regiment
- Conflicts: World War II; Eastern Front; Southern Front; 4th Ukrainian Front; 3rd Belorussian Front; 1st Belorussian Front; Battle of Berlin
- Awards: Hero of the Soviet Union

Davit Vasiles dze Jabidze (Georgian: დავით ვასილეს ძე ჯაბიძე, Russian: Давид Васильевич Джабидзе, romanized as David Vasilyevich Dzhabidze; 23 February 1916 – 15 December 1982) was a Georgian-Soviet fighter ace of World War II.

== Early life ==
David Jabidze was born on 23 February 1916 in the village Chkhari, Georgia into a family of farmers. After finishing school, he started to work as a miner. Later he underwent courses in Chemistry and learned flying at a flight club in Tbilisi. Following enlistment in 1937, Jabidze graduated from the Stalingrad Military Aviation School of Pilots in 1940.

== Military service ==
Captain Jabidze's first action at the Eastern Front was as flight commander of the 158th Fighter Aviation Regiment. During a combat sortie on July 1941 over the skies of Leningrad, he rammed his I-16 against a German Ju 88 and managed to land with the damaged aircraft. On 14 December 1941 he was hit and seriously wounded but able to bail out with parachute. Afterwards he graduated from the Airforce Academy. From Augusts 1943 to 1944 Jabidze served as a deputy squadron commander of the 43rd Fighter Aviation Regiment and from August 1944 to May 1945 as squadron commander of the 812th Fighter Aviation Regiment. He flew combat missions over several theatres, including later in Germany over Berlin, flying I-16, Yak-7, Yak-1 and Yak-9 fighter aircraft. In 64 air battles, Captain Jabidze scored 22 personal and 2 pair victories. (Note: Some sources say he had 18 shootdowns.) He also engaged enemy ground forces in a total of 37 strafings. On 16 May 1946, he was awarded the title Hero of the Soviet Union.

== Post war life ==
David Jabidze retired from the military in 1947 and taught at Tbilisi State University as a Professor of Historical Sciences. He lived in Tbilisi until his death on 15 December 1982.
