= Horodok, Lviv Oblast =

City in Lviv Oblast, Ukraine

Horodok Городок Gródek Jagielloński
- City
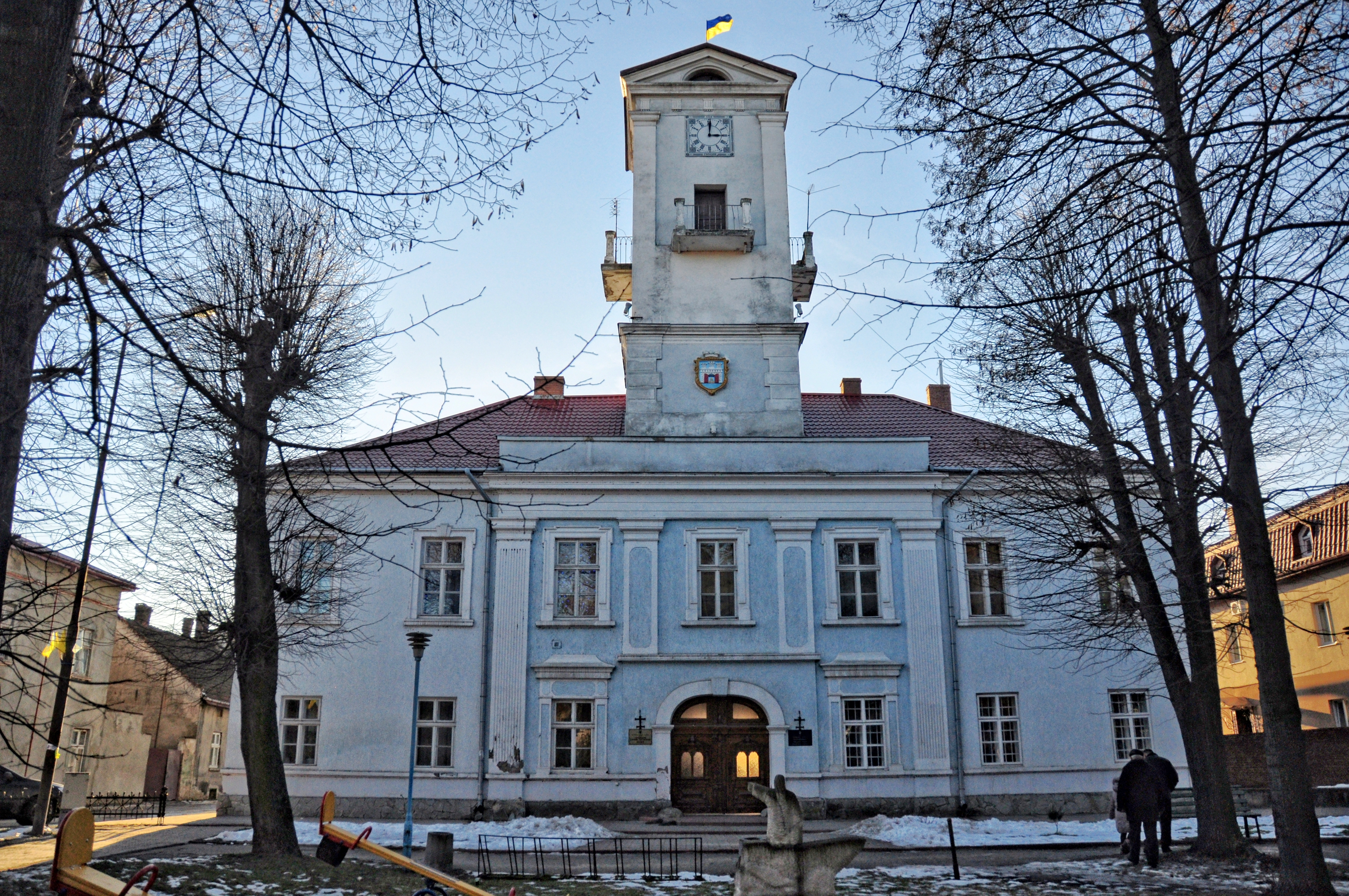
- City Hall

- Flag Coat of arms
- Interactive map of Horodok
- Location in Ukraine Location in Lviv Oblast
- Coordinates: 49°47′00″N 23°38′40″E
- Country: Ukraine
- Oblast: Lviv Oblast
- Raion: Lviv Raion
- Hromada: Horodok urban hromada

Area
  - Total: 30 km^{2} (12 sq mi)

Population (2022)
  - Total: 16,085
  - Density: 540/km^{2} (1,400/sq mi)
- Time zone: UTC+02:00 (EET)
  - Summer (DST): UTC+03:00 (EEST)
- Postal code: 81500
- Area codes: +380 3231
- Website: місто Городок ^{(Ukrainian)}

Horodok (Ukrainian: Городок, IPA: [ɦoroˈdɔk]; Polish: Gródek Jagielloński) is a city in Lviv Raion, Lviv Oblast, western Ukraine. It hosts the administration of Horodok urban hromada, one of the hromadas of Ukraine. Located to the west of Lviv on the river Vereshytsia, which forms a large pond in the area, the city has a population of 16,085 (2022 estimate).

== History ==
Historical population
Year	Pop.	±%
1921	10,491	—
1931	12,942	+23.4%
2022	16,085	+24.3%

Horodok was first mentioned by Nestor the Chronicler in the Primary Chronicle. During the 13-14th centuries it served as an important fortification of Galicia-Volhynia. The Galician–Volhynian Chronicle mentions that the King Daniel of Galicia came to Horodok with his forces to join Mstislav Mstislavich the Bold while they fought with Polish-Hungarians over the Galician land.

In the mid-14th century, together with whole Kingdom of Rus, the settlement was annexed by the Kingdom of Poland. Its name was changed to Gródek, and it remained in Poland for the next 400 years. In 1372, King Władysław II Jagiełło founded here a Roman Catholic parish. During this reign, Gródek also received Magdeburg rights. This was the place where King of Poland and Grand Duke of Lithuania Jagiełło died on 1 June 1434.

Until the First Partition of Poland, Gródek was administratively located in the Ruthenian Voivodeship in the Lesser Poland Province. During the 16-17th centuries an Orthodox brotherhood and school were active in the town. A battle between Ukrainian Cossack and Polish forces took place here in 1655, in which hetman Bohdan Khmelnytsky defeated Polish forces and then laid siege to Lviv.

In 1772, Gródek was annexed by the Habsburg Empire, as part of Austrian Galicia, where it remained until late 1918. It was a district centre under Austrian rule. German-speaking settlers established their own colony, called Vorderberg (1788). Austrian authorities closed local Franciscan monastery, turning it into a military depot. In 1903, a monument to Władysław II Jagiełło was unveiled here, and in 1906, the name of the town was changed from Gródek to Gródek Jagielloński, in honour of the king. During World War I, Horodok was twice the location of fierce battles: In the Battle of Gródek (1914), the advancing Russian army captured the town from Austria-Hungary, and a year later, a combined German and Austro-Hungarian force fought the Russians in the Battle of Gródek (1915).

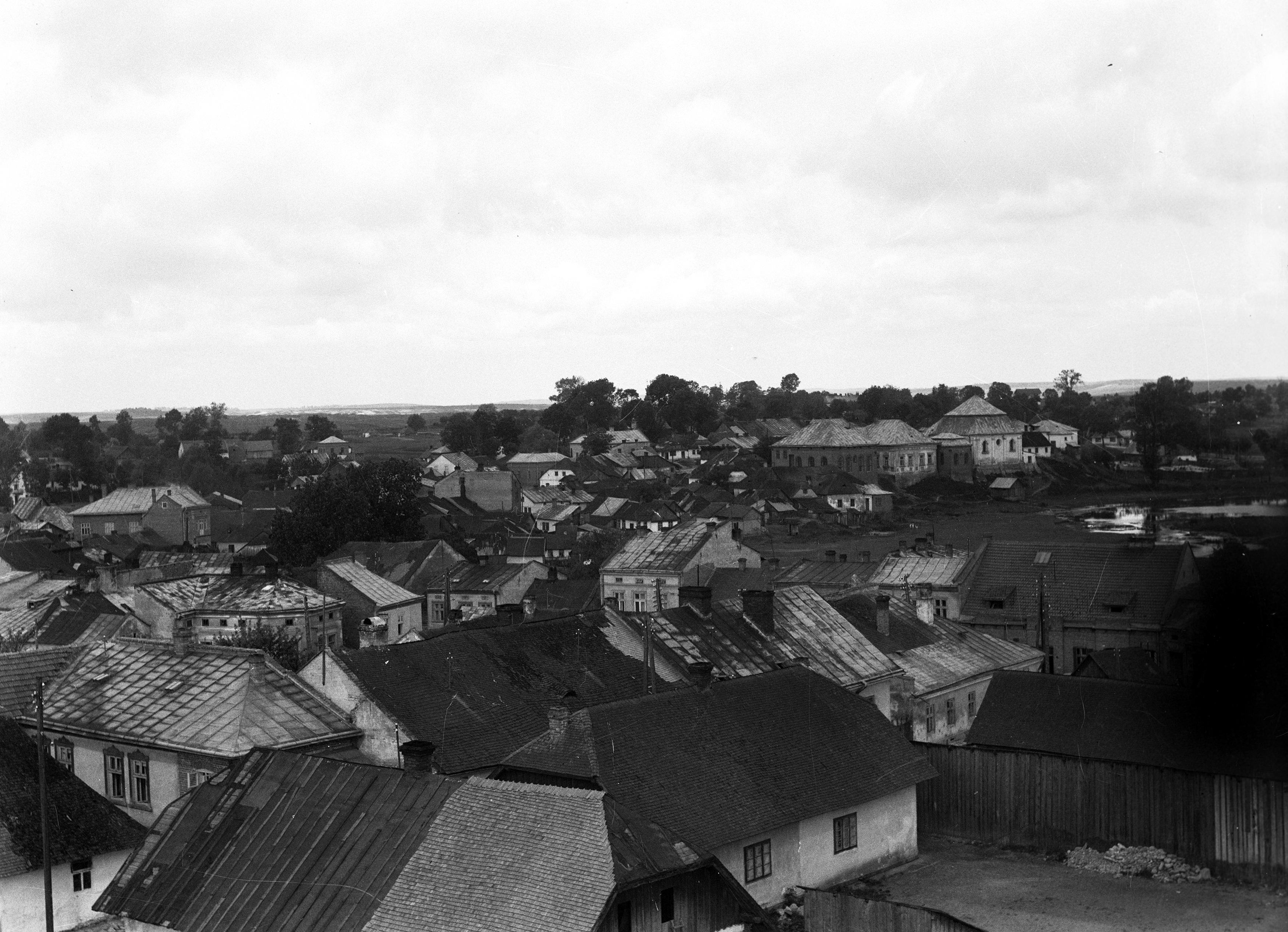
Aerial view of Gródek Jagielloński in 1934

During the Polish-Ukrainian War in 1919 Horodok was contested due to its role as an important point on the Lviv-Przemyśl Railway. In the Second Polish Republic, Gródek was the seat of a county in Lwów Voivodeship. The town had three Roman Catholic churches, one Greek-Catholic, and a synagogue. It also was a military garrison, where a unit of Polish Army’s 5th Infantry Division was stationed. According to the 1921 census, Poles made 72% of the population, Ukrainians 26%, and Jews 2%.

During the Invasion of Poland, Gródek was captured by the Wehrmacht on 13 September 1939, and later taken over by the Red Army. In 1939–1941, Russian-communist repressed the peaceful population of the city, especially against representatives of the Polish intelligentsia. It was then recaptured by the Germans in 1941. At this time, the Jewish population of Gródek was approximately 5,000 people, or 800 families. During the summer of 1942, approximately half of the Jews in Gródek were murdered by the Nazis assisted, in some cases, by their local Ukrainian auxiliaries. The remainder were shot and buried in mass graves on 3 February 1943 in the final liquidation of the Jewish ghetto in the town. Only a few Jews survived the war.

From 1945 to 1991, Gródek was a part of the Soviet Union, and returned to its historical name of Horodok. Since 1991 it has been part of Ukraine.

Until 18 July 2020, Horodok was the administrative center of Horodok Raion. The raion was abolished in July 2020 as part of the administrative reform of Ukraine, which reduced the number of raions of Lviv Oblast to seven. The area of Horodok Raion was merged into Lviv Raion.

== Churches and Monasteries ==
=== Gallery ===
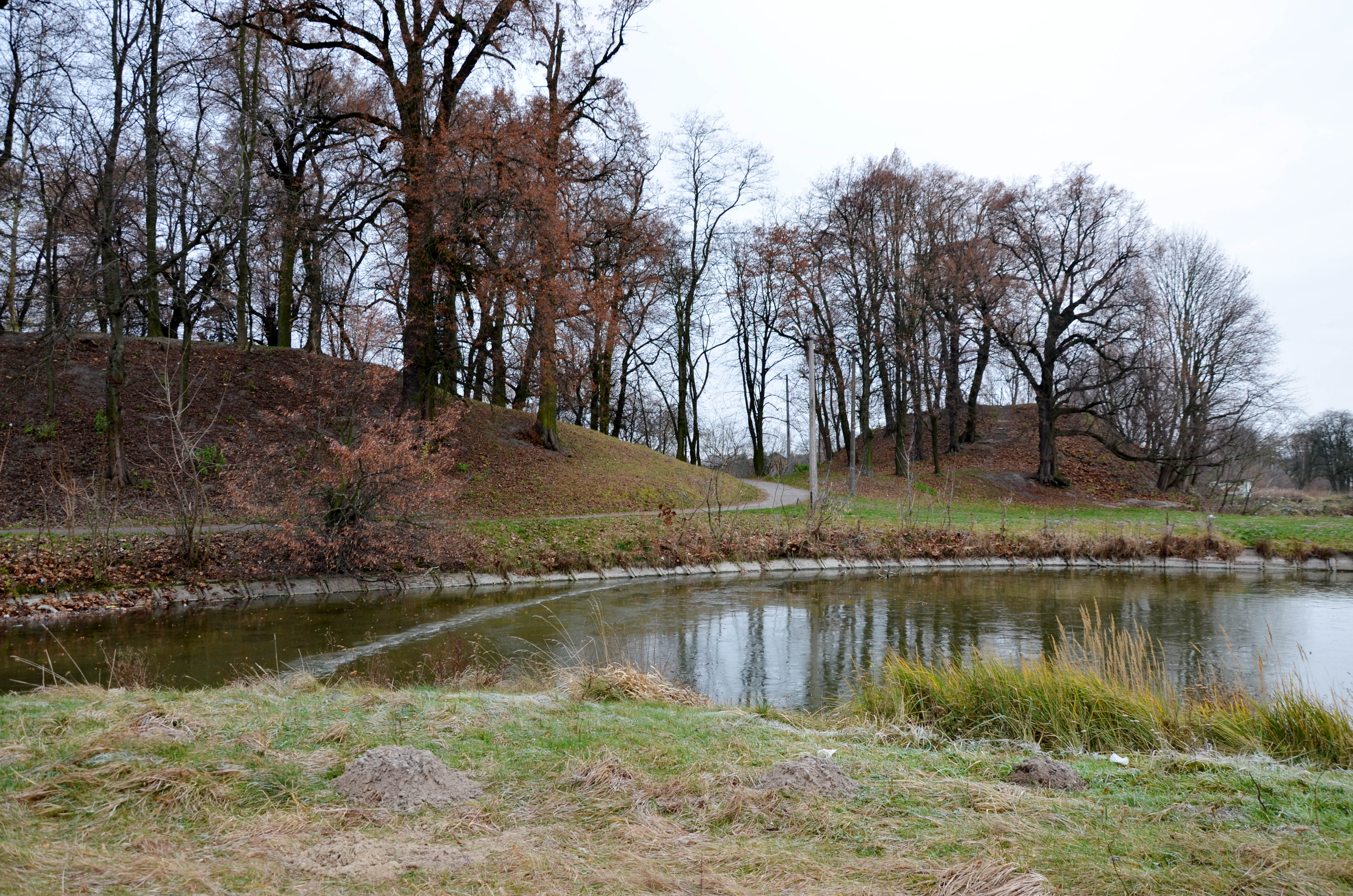
Earthy fortifications from the times of the Galician principality XI-XIII centuries.

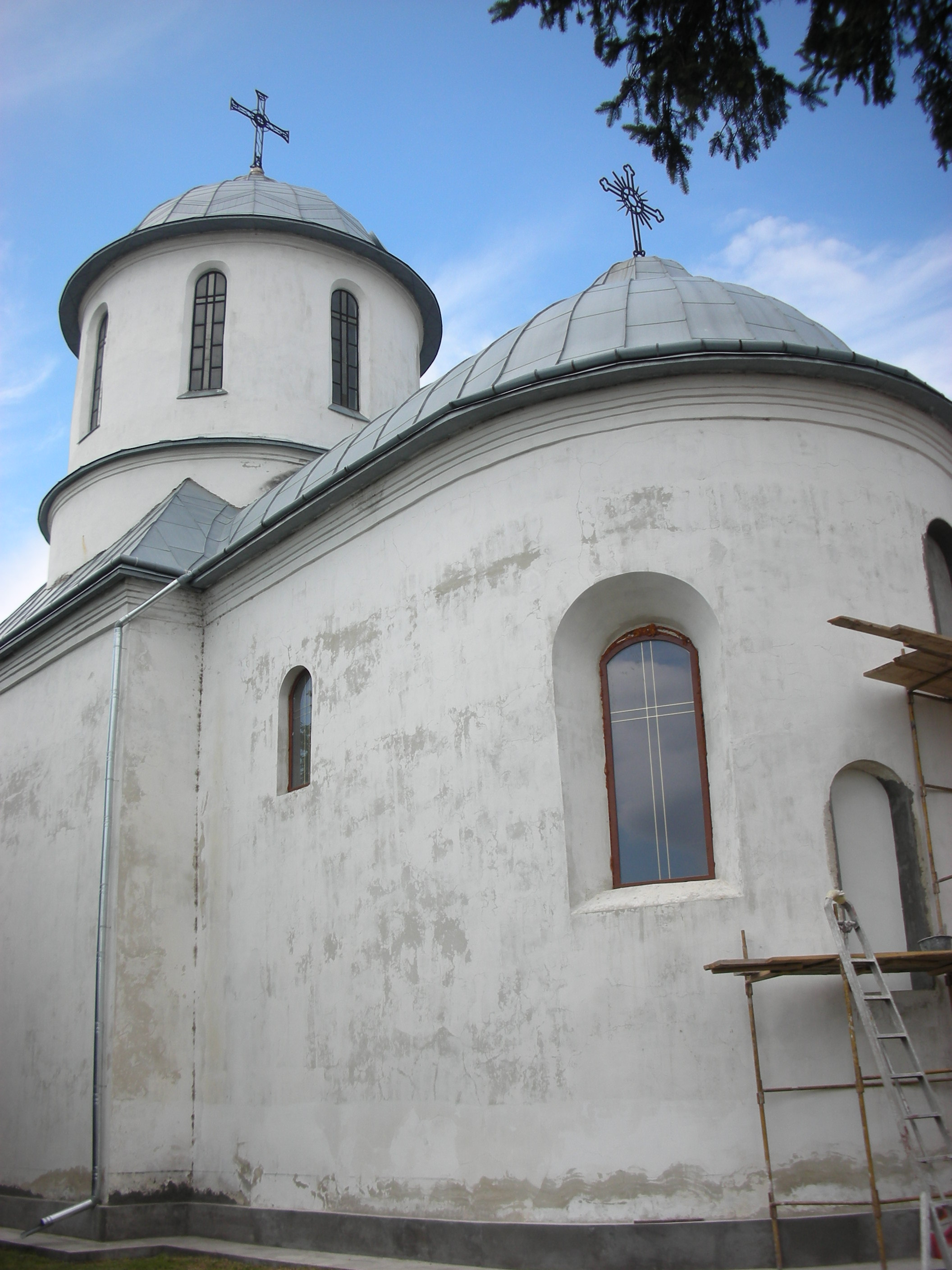
Holy Transfiguration Monastery, XV - XX centuries.

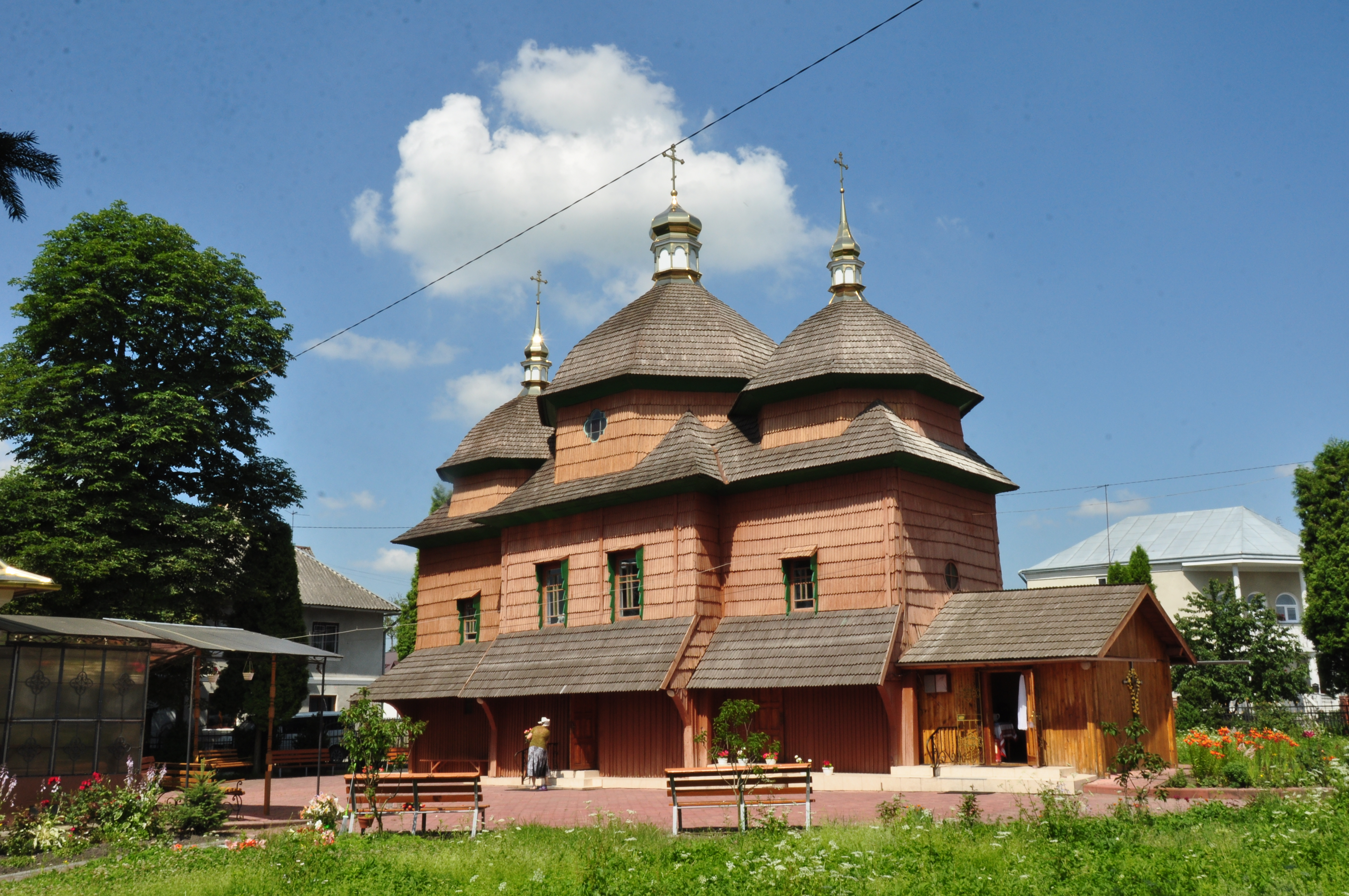
Wooden church of St. John the Baptist, built in 1755

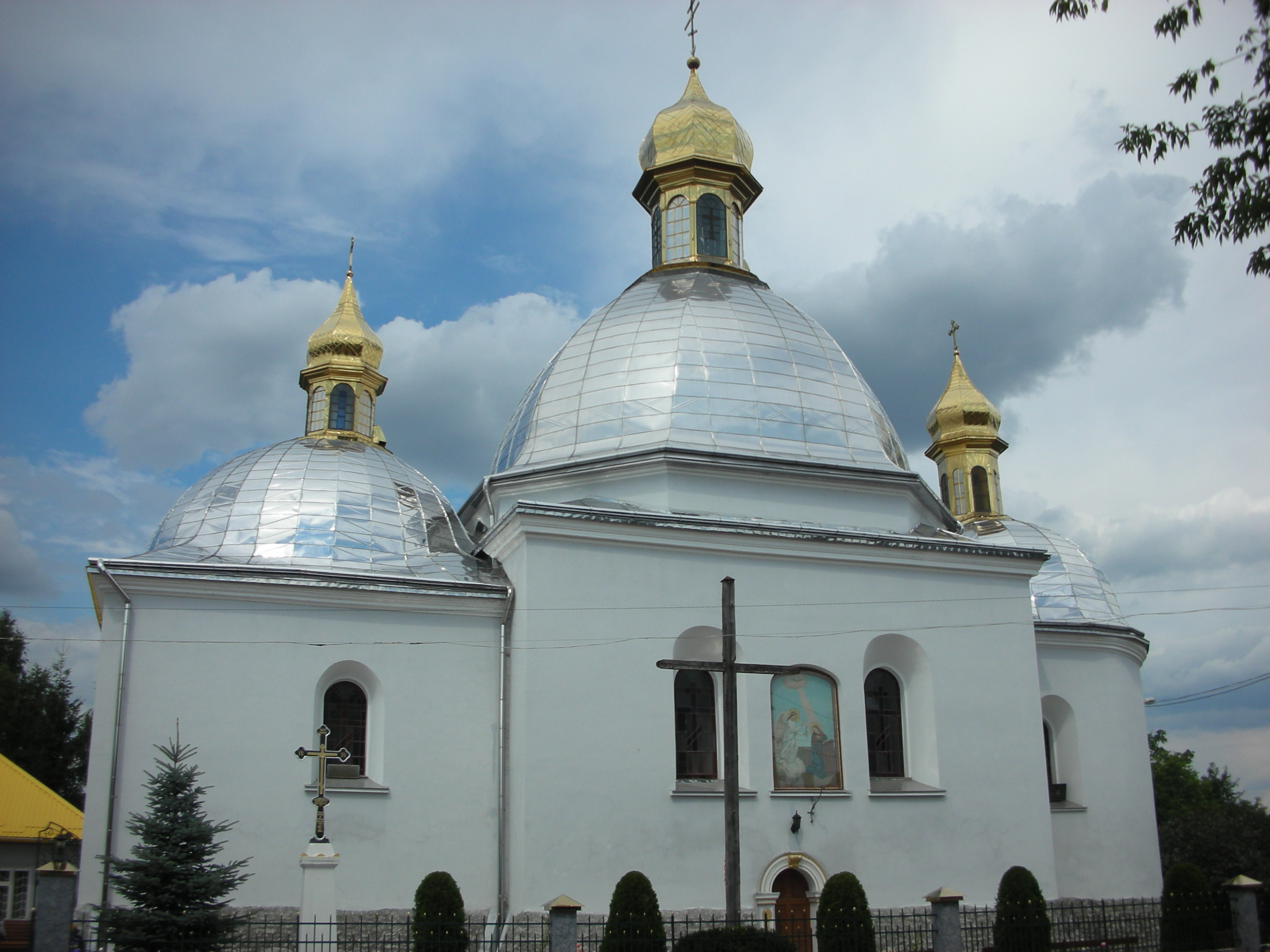
Church of the Annunciation, built in 1633

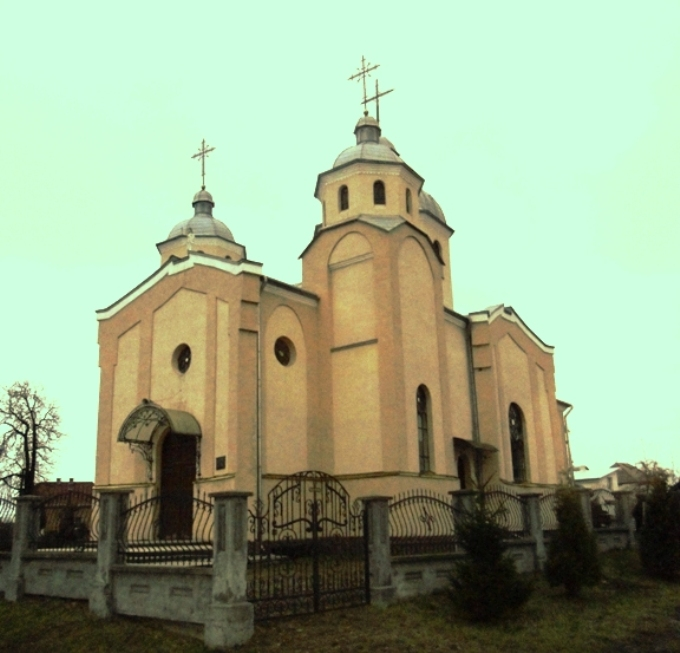
Church of the Holy Spirit

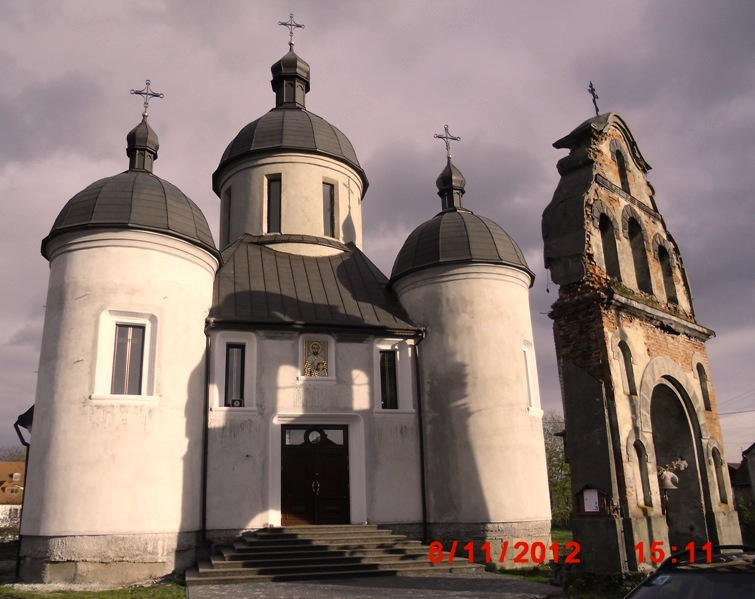
Church of St. Nicholas, built in 1510

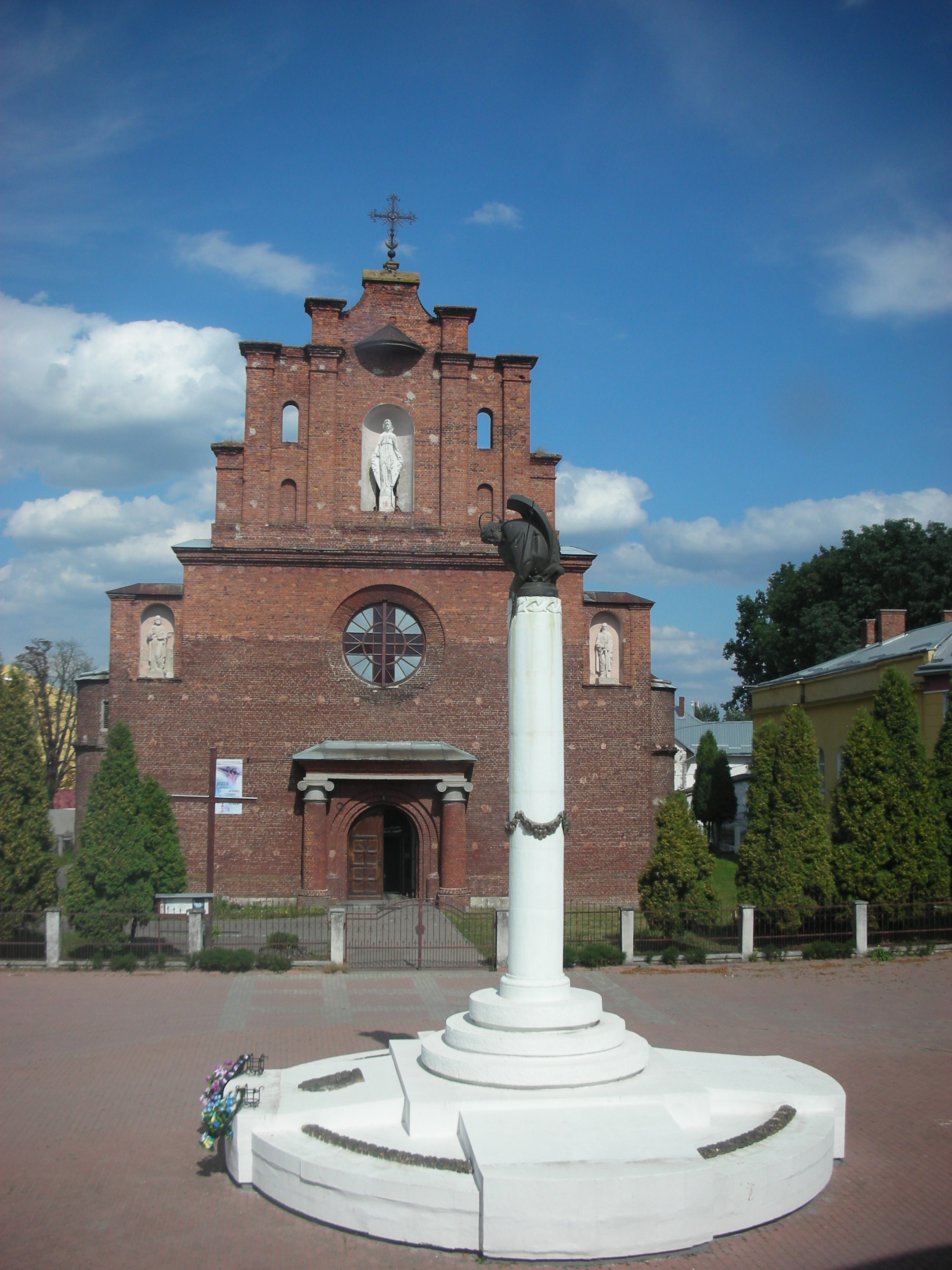
A memorial to the victims of political repressions and the Exaltation of the Holy Cross Church

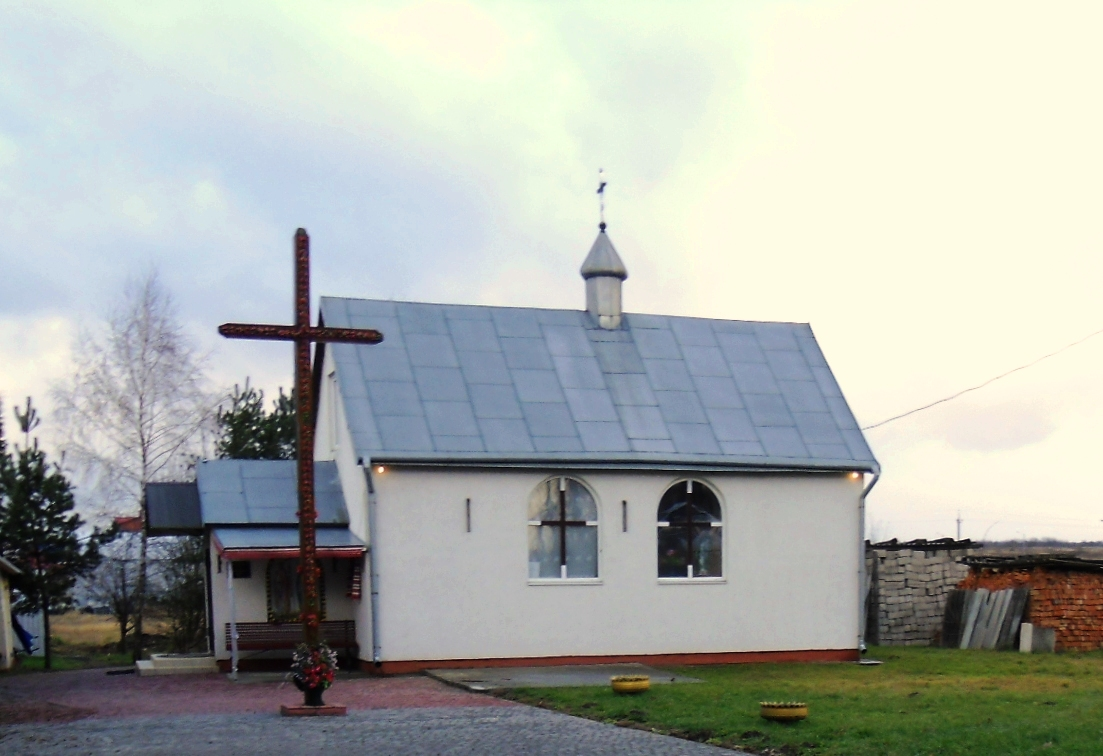
St. Volodymyr & Olga Church

=== Religious buildings ===
#	The name	description	address	file
001	Church of the Annunciation of the Blessed Virgin Mary (Stone)	Church of the Annunciation of the Blessed Virgin Mary of 1633 (Stone). ^{(Architectural monument)}	Kotsiubynskoho Street, 5	
002	St. John the Baptist Church	Church of St. John the Baptist of 1754 (wood).^{(Architectural monument)}	Stusa Street, 12	
003	Roman Catholic Church the Exaltation of the Holy Cross	Church (the Gothic part) was built at the expense of King Wladyslaw Jagiello.^{(Architectural monument)}	Lvivska Street, 4	
004	Church of the Transfiguration in Horodok	Built in 15th century (the former Franciscan monastery).	Parkova Street, 3	
005	Church of the Holy Spirit	The church was built on the site of the Roman Catholic chapel of St. Barbara.	Lvivska Street, 79	
006	Church of St. Nicholas with a bell tower (1510)	Built on the site of a wooden church of St. Nicholas of Myra.	Sviatomykolaivska St.	
007	St. Volodymyr & Olga Church		Horodok (Dovzhanka)	
008	The Church of the Beheading of St. John the Baptist		Horodok (Cherliany faubourg)	

== Notable people ==
- Stepan Bilak – Ukrainian politician, envoy to the Polish Sejm in the 1920s and 1930s
- Franciszek Duszeńko – Polish sculptor, rector of Academy of Fine Arts in Gdańsk
- Igor Gorin - American baritone, emigrated to the United States as a teenager
- Tadeusz Kaniowski – Polish radiologist and physician
- Roman Lysko – Ukrainian Greek Catholic priest and martyr
- Ross Martin – American actor, emigrated to the United States as an infant
- Les Martovych (1871–1916), Ukrainian writer, lawyer, and community activist from 1899 to 1903
- Jerzy Sawicki – Polish legal expert and law professor
- Hipolit Sliwinski – Polish architect and politician, envoy to the Sejm
- Dmitry Vergun – publicist, journalist, poet, and historian

== Twin towns ==
Horodok is twinned with:

- Nisko in Poland
