= List of Heroes of the Soviet Union (D) =

The Hero of the Soviet Union was the highest distinction of the Soviet Union. It was awarded 12,775 times. Due to the large size of the list, it has been broken up into multiple pages.

This color, along with the † (dagger), indicates that the title was awarded posthumously.

== Military personnel ==
Name	Unit	Rank	Date of award	Notes
Vasily Davidenko; Russian: Василий Иванович Давиденко	214th Guards Infantry Regiment	Guard Lieutenant Colonel	26 October 1943	—
Grigory Ivanovich Davidenko; Russian: Григорий Иванович Давиденко	15th Reconnaissance Aviation Regiment	Lieutenant	22 January 1944	—
Grigory Mitrofanovich Davidenko; Russian: Григорий Митрофанович Давиденко	«KM-97» of the Baltic Fleet	Foreman 1st Class	22 July 1944	—
Stepan Davidenko; Russian: Степан Павлович Давиденко	24th Bomber Aviation Regiment	Captain	4 February 1944	—
Viktor Davidkov; Russian: Виктор Иосифович Давидков	131st Fighter Aviation Regiment	Captain	6 June 1942	—
Nikolai Davidovich; Russian: Николай Петрович Давидович	21st Infantry Regiment	Sergeant	29 October 1943	—
Abdrauf Davletov; Bashkir: Әбдрәүеф Ғәни улы Дәүләтов	58th Guards Cavalry Regiment	Guard Lieutenant	15 January 1944	—
Bayan Davletov; Russian: Баян Еркеевич Давлетов	1281st Infantry Regiment	Lieutenant	30 October 1943	—
Bakir Davlyatov; Tatar: Бәкер Дәүләтов	60th Guards Cavalry Regiment	Guard Senior Sergeant	15 January 1944	—
Anton Davidenko; Russian: Антон Корнеевич Давыденко	23rd Guards Motorized-Infantry Brigade	Guard Major	27 June 1945	—
Konstantin Davidenko; Russian: Константин Сергеевич Давыденко	62nd Assault Aviation Regiment	Senior Lieutenant	18 August 1945	—
Aleksandr Davidov; Russian: Александр Дмитриевич Давыдов	337th Long-Range Aviation Regiment	Captain	5 November 1944	—
Andrey Davidov; Russian: Андрей Яковлевич Давыдов	95th Tank Brigade	Staff Sergeant	15 January 1944	—
Vasily Innokentievich Davidov; Russian: Василий Иннокентьевич Давыдов	674th Infantry Regiment	Captain	8 May 1946	—
Vasily Kuzmich Davidov; Russian: Василий Кузьмич Давыдов	5th Guards Bomber Aviation Regiment	Guard Captain	31 December 1942	—
Viktor Davidov; Russian: Виктор Иосифович Давыдов	72nd Separate Reconnaissance Aviation Regiment	Captain	15 May 1946	—
Vladimir Davidov; Russian: Владимир Ильич Давыдов	15th Guards Infantry Regiment	Guard Lieutenant	16 May 1944	—
Yevdokim Davidov; Russian: Евдоким Андреевич Давыдов	705th Infantry Regiment	Red Army Man	17 October 1943	—
Ivan Vasilevich Davidov; Russian: Иван Васильевич Давыдов	125th Infantry Corps	Major-General	31 May 1945 †	Killed in action on 26 April 1945
Ivan Yevgenyevich Davidov; Russian: Иван Евгеньевич Давыдов	955th Infantry Regiment	Lieutenant Colonel	23 October 1943	—
Konstantin Davidov; Russian: Константин Иванович Давыдов	657th Assault Aviation Regiment	Captain	18 August 1945	—
Lado Davydov; Russian: Ладо Шириншаевич Давыдов	210th Separate Reconnaissance Company	Red Army Man	22 July 1944	—
Nikolai Davidov; Russian: Николай Сергеевич Давыдов	75th Guards Assault Aviation Regiment	Guard Senior Lieutenant	19 April 1945	—
Pavel Davidov; Russian: Павел Фёдорович Давыдов	140th Guards Infantry Regiment	Guard Lieutenant Colonel	15 May 1946	—
Selivrest Davidov; Russian: Селивёрст Васильевич Давыдов	107th Guards Anti-tank Fighter Artillery Regiment	Guard Sergeant	1 November 1943	—
Semyon Davidov; Russian: Семён Семёнович Давыдов	156th Guards Artillery Regiment	Guard Major	27 February 1945	—
Sergey Davidov; Russian: Сергей Степанович Давыдов	12th Guards Mine-torpedo Aviation Regiment	Guard Captain	22 July 1944	—
Fyodor Davidov; Russian: Фёдор Николаевич Давыдов	685th Infantry Regiment	Staff Sergeant	30 October 1943	—
Stepan Dadaev; Russian: Степан Павлович Дадаев	17th Guards Infantry Regiment	Guard Starshina	29 June 1945 †	Killed in action on 26 April 1945
Maharram Dadashev; Azerbaijani: Məhərrəm Dadaşov	233rd Tank Brigade	Staff Sergeant	24 March 1945	—
Ivan Daydoev; Russian: Иван Тимофеевич Дайдоев	5th Guards Artillery Regiment	Guard Lieutenant	20 December 1943	—
Amiran Daneliya; Russian: Амиран Иосифович Данелия	53rd Guards Tank Brigade	Guard Staff Sergeant	10 April 1945	—
Nikolai Danilenko; Russian: Николай Никитович Даниленко; Ukrainian: Микола Микитович Даниленко	18th Guards Fighter Aviation Regiment	Guard Captain	19 April 1945	—
Aleksandr Danilin; Russian: Александр Михайлович Данилин	868th Infantry Regiment	Staff Sergeant	10 April 1945	—
Ivan Danilin; Russian: Иван Никитович Данилин	26th Guards Mechanized Brigade	Guard Captain	17 October 1943	—
Anton Danilitsky; Russian: Антон Петрович Данилицкий	53rd Tank Regiment	Junior Lieutenant	23 September 1944	—
Aleksey Vasilevich Danilov; Russian: Алексей Васильевич Данилицкий	161st Guards Bomber Aviation Regiment	Guard Lieutenant	27 June 1945	—
Aleksey Dmitrievich Danilov; Russian: Алексей Дмитриевич Данилов	221st Guards Infantry Regiment	Red Army Guard	15 January 1944	—
Aleksey Ilyich Danilov; Russian: Алексей Ильич Данилов	3rd Guards Tank Brigade	Guard Sergeant	24 March 1945 †	Killed in action on 30 June 1944
Aleksey Stepanovich Danilov; Russian: Алексей Степанович Данилов	Consolidated tank groups of the 3rd Guards Mechanized Corps	Guard Captain	25 October 1943	—
Andrey Borisovich Danilov; Russian: Андрей Борисович Данилов	233rd Guards Artillery Regiment	Guard Sergeant	24 December 1943	—
Vasily Alexandrovich Danilov; Russian: Василий Александрович Данилов	1118th Infantry Regiment	Sergeant	22 February 1944	—
Grigory Danilov; Russian: Григорий Семёнович Данилов	807th Assault Aviation Regiment	Staff Sergeant	1 May 1943	—
Leonid Danilov; Russian: Леонид Парфёнович Данилов	9th Guards Mechanized Brigade	Guard Staff Sergeant	25 October 1943	—
Mikhail Danilov; Russian: Михаил Иванович Данилов	459th Infantry Regiment	Lieutenant	24 March 1945	—
Nikolai Danilov; Russian: Николай Фёдорович Данилов	163rd Separate Reconnaissance Battalion	Deputy Commissar	22 February 1943 †	Killed in action on 25 July 1941
Pavel Danilov; Russian: Павел Фёдорович Данилов	450th Infantry Regiment	Red Army Man	24 March 1945	—
Pyotr Danilov; Russian: Пётр Алексеевич Данилов	Political Department of the 3rd Army	Major	23 July 1944 †	Killed in action on 21 February 1944
Stepan Danilov; Russian: Степан Павлович Данилов	56th Fighter Aviation Regiment	Major	17 November 1939	—
Viktor Danilchenko; Russian: Виктор Иванович Данильченко	319th Guards Mountain-Infantry Regiment	Guard Lieutenant	24 March 1945 †	Died of wounds on 2 May 1944
Ivan Danilchenko; Russian: Иван Андреевич Данильченко	237th Assault Aviation Regiment	Captain	1 July 1944	—
Yeremey Danielian; Armenian: Երեմ Դանիելյանց	60th Guards Cavalry Regiment	Guard Staff Sergeant	15 January 1944	—
Leonid Danilyuk; Russian: Леонид Семёнович Данилюк	1822nd Self-propelled Artillery Regiment	Major	31 May 1945	—
Fyodor Dankov; Russian: Фёдор Трофимович Данков	107th Tank Brigade	Captain	13 September 1944	—
Andrey Dankin; Russian: Андрей Фёдорович Данькин	5th Guards Aviation Regiment	Guard Major	5 November 1944	—
Vasily Danko; Russian: Василий Иосифович Данько	182nd Guards Infantry Regiment	Guard Captain	20 December 1943	—
Sergey Danshchin; Russian: Сергей Петрович Даньщин	2nd Guards Aviation Regiment	Guard Captain	25 March 1943	—
Nikolai Danyushin; Russian: Николай Алексеевич Данюшин	4th Guards Near-Bomber Aviation Regiment	Guard Starshina	18 August 1945	—
Levon Darbinyan; Armenian: Լևոն Դարբինյան	69th Mechanized Brigade	Colonel	10 January 1944 †	Died of wounds on 28 December 1943
Nshan Darbinyan; Armenian: Նշան Դարբինյան	49th Guards Tank Brigade	Guard Staff Sergeant	27 February 1945	—
Amantai Daulitbekov; Russian: Амантай Даулитбеков	1180th Anti-tank Fighter Artillery Regiment	Staff Sergeant	24 December 1943 †	Killed in action on 9 July 1943
Iskander Dautov; Tatar: Искәндәр Даутов	58th Guards Cavalry Regiment	Red Army Guard	15 January 1944 †	Killed in action on 26 September 1943
Fyodor Dakhnovsky; Russian: Фёдор Тарасович Дахновский	202nd Infantry Division	Colonel	28 April 1945	—
Ivan Datsenko; Russian: Иван Иванович Даценко	10th Guards Aviation Regiment	Guard Senior Lieutenant	18 September 1943	—
Hansultan Dachiev; Russian: Хансултан Чапаевич Дачиев	58th Guards Cavalry Regiment	Red Army Guard	15 January 1944	—
Fyodor Dachko; Russian: Фёдор Терентьевич Дачко	99th Guards Separate Anti-tank Fighter Division	Guard Staff Sergeant	20 December 1943	—
Ivan Dvadnenko; Russian: Иван Карпович Двадненко	60th Guards Cavalry Regiment	Guard Junior Lieutenant	9 February 1944	—
Pavel Dvoychenko; Russian: Павел Иванович Двойченков	576th Artillery Regiment	Senior Lieutenant	13 November 1943 †	Killed in action on 14 October 1943
Georgy Dvornikov; Russian: Георгий Тимофеевич Дворников	167th Guards Assault Aviation Regiment	Guard Senior Lieutenant	26 October 1944	—
Ivan Dvorsky; Russian: Иван Иванович Дворский	801st Infantry Regiment	Red Army Man	19 April 1945 †	Killed in action on 7 April 1945
Yuri Dvuzhilny; Russian: Юрий Михайлович Двужильный	878th Infantry Regiment	Captain	24 March 1945 †	Killed in action on 26 June 1944
Nikolai Dvurechensky; Russian: Николай Иванович Двуреченский	994th Infantry Regiment	Lieutenant	10 April 1945	—
Isaak Dvuchbabny; Russian: Исаак Шаевич Двухбабный	490th Anti-tank Fighter Artillery Regiment	Sergeant	16 May 1944 †	Killed in action on 5 November 1943
Mikhail Devyatayev; Russian: Михаил Петрович Девятаев	104th Guards Fighter Aviation Regiment	Guard Senior Lieutenant	15 August 1957	—
Aleksandr Devyatyarov; Russian: Александр Андреевич Девятьяров	140th Guards Assault Aviation Regiment	Guard Major	10 April 1945	—
Pyotr Dyogtev; Russian: Пётр Максимович Дёгтев	178th Guards Infantry Regiment	Guard Sergeant	22 February 1944	—
Aleksandr Degtyaryov; Russian: Александр Ильич Дегтярёв	177th Infantry Regiment	Red Army Man	1 November 1943	—
Vasily Degtyaryov; Russian: Василий Леонтьевич Дегтярёв	571st Assault Aviation Regiment	Lieutenant	11 November 1990 †	Committed suicide to avoid capture on 9 July 1942
Vladimir Degtyaryov; Russian: Владимир Арсентьевич Дегтярёв	119th Aviation Regiment	Major	16 May 1944	—
Nikolai Degtyaryov; Russian: Николай Васильевич Дегтярёв	302nd Howtizer Artillery Regiment	Senior Lieutenant	21 March 1940	—
Nikolai Degtyar; Russian: Николай Иванович Дегтярь	95th Guards Assault Aviation Regiment	Guard Major	27 June 1945	—
Viktor Dedkov; Russian: Виктор Семёнович Дедков	248th Motorized Engineering Battalion	Senior Lieutenant-Technician	22 February 1944	—
Vladimir Deev; Russian: Владимир Николаевич Деев	743rd Infantry Regiment	Red Army Man	24 March 1945	—
Pyotr Dezhenin; Russian: Пётр Сергеевич Деженин	3rd Guards Airborne Regiment	Guard Staff Sergeant	24 March 1945	—
Pyotr Deykalo; Russian: Пётр Григорьевич Дейкало	386th Separate Marine Corps Battalion of the Black Sea Fleet	Lieutenant	17 November 1943	—
Aleksey Deynega; Russian: Алексей Тихонович Дейнега	43rd Engineer-Sapper Brigade	Staff Sergeant	29 June 1945	—
Mikhail Deynezhenko; Russian: Михаил Никифорович Дейнеженко	40th Guards Cannon Artillery Brigade	Guard Captain	10 April 1945	—
Pavel Deynekin; Russian: Павел Иванович Дейнекин	9th Guards Tank Brigade	Guard Lieutenant	24 March 1945	—
Nikolai Deyneko; Russian: Николай Григорьевич Дейнеко	184th Guards Infantry Regiment	Guard Senior Lieutenant	22 February 1944	—
Stepan Deyneko; Russian: Степан Петрович Дейнеко	367th Bomber Aviation Regiment	Captain	24 May 1943	—
Nikolai Delegey; Russian: Николай Куприянович Делегей	508th Fighter Aviation Regiment	Major	1 July 1944	—
Erdeni Delikov; Russian: Эрдни Теледжиевич Деликов	273rd Cavalry Regiment	Sergeant	31 March 1943 †	Killed in action on 21 July 1942
Pavel Deltsov; Russian: Павел Андреевич Дельцов	24th Bomber Aviation Regiment	Captain	13 April 1944	—
Leonid Dema; Russian: Леонид Васильевич Дема	112nd Guards Fighter Aviation Regiment	Guard Captain	26 October 1944	—
Aleksandr Demakov; Russian: Александр Иванович Демаков	2nd Motorized-Infantry Company	Senior Lieutenant	5 July 1982 †	Killed in action on 21 April 1982
Georgy Demanov; Russian: Георгий Георгиевич Деманов	932nd Infantry Regiment	Lieutenant	22 February 1944	—
Laverenty Demenkov; Russian: Лаврентий Васильевич Деменков	1063rd Infantry Regiment	Lieutenant	21 July 1944	—
Sergey Demenkov; Russian: Сергей Васильевич Деменков	103rd Guards Fighter Aviation Regiment	Guard Senior Lieutenant	28 September 1943	—
Andrey Dementev; Russian: Андрей Александрович Дементьев	279th Guards Light Artillery Regiment	Guard Major	15 May 1946	—
Yevgeny Dementev; Russian: Евгений Ильич Дементьев	167th Guards Assault Aviation Regiment	Guard Lieutenant	29 June 1945	—
Ivan Andreevich Dementev; Russian: Иван Андреевич Дементьев	890th Artillery Regiment	Staff Sergeant	26 October 1944	—
Ivan Pavlovich Dementev; Russian: Иван Павлович Дементьев	384th Separate Marine Corps Battalion of the Black Sea Fleet	Red Fleet Man	20 April 1945	—
Yuri Dementev; Russian: Юрий Александрович Дементьев	1077th Infantry Regiment	Lieutenant	24 March 1945	—
Andrey Demekhin; Russian: Андрей Васильевич Демехин	503rd Assault Aviation Regiment	Lieutenant	13 April 1944	—
Ivan Demidenko; Russian: Иван Саввич Демиденко	34th Guards Artillery Regiment	Guard Sergeant	16 October 1943	—
Aleksandr Demidov; Russian: Александр Александрович Демидов	234th Guards Infantry Regiment	Red Army Guard	15 January 1944	—
Vasily Demidov; Russian: Василий Александрович Демидов	10th Separate Reconnaissance Aviation Regiment	Senior Lieutenant	19 April 1945	—
Vladimir Demidov; Russian: Владимир Алексеевич Демидов	7th Guards Assault Aviation Regiment	Guard Captain	26 October 1944	—
Rostislav Demidov; Russian: Ростислав Сергеевич Демидов	1st Guards Mine-Torpedo Aviation Regiment	Guard Senior Lieutenant	6 March 1945	—
Aleksandr Ivanovich Dyomin; Russian: Александр Иванович Дёмин	900th Mountain Infantry Regiment	Lieutenant Colonel	24 March 1945 †	Died of wounds on 24 September 1944
Aleksandr Fyodorovich Dyomin; Russian: Александр Фёдорович Дёмин	451st Howitzer Artillery Regiment	Sergeant	26 October 1943 †	Killed in action on 24 September 1944
Nikolai Aleksandrovich Dyomin; Russian: Николай Александрович Дёмин	65th Tank Brigade	Lieutenant	22 August 1944	—
Nikolai Arkhipovich Dyomin; Russian: Николай Архипович Дёмин	8th Infantry Regiment	Starshina	8 September 1945	—
Nikolai Nikolaevich Dyomin; Russian: Николай Николаевич Дёмин	17th Guards Infantry Regiment	Guard Junior Sergeant	29 June 1945	—
Nikolai Tarasovich Dyomin; Russian: Николай Тарасович Дёмин	303rd Infantry Regiment	Red Army Man	30 October 1943	—
Aleksandr Samuilovich Dyomin; Russian: Александр Самуилович Дёмкин	756th Infantry Regiment	Red Army Man	7 April 1940	—
Vladimir Fedotovich Demura; Russian: Владимир Федотович Демура	768th Infantry Regiment	Junior Commander	21 March 1940 †	Killed in action on 14 February 1940
Vasily Dmitrievich Demchenko; Russian: Василий Дмитриевич Демченко	283rd Guards Infantry Regiment	Guard Captain	27 February 1945	—
Vasily Ivanovich Demchenko; Russian: Василий Иванович Демченко	45th Mechanized Brigade	Sergeant	13 September 1944	—
Georgy Demchenko; Russian: Георгий Александрович Демченко	66th Separate Motorized-Infantry Brigade	Lieutenant	15 November 1983 †	Killed in action on 16 May 1983
Fyodor Demchenko; Russian: Фёдор Васильевич Демченко	30th Guards Airborne Regiment	Guard Senior Lieutenant	20 December 1943	—
Filipp Demchenko; Russian: Филипп Трофимович Демченков	150th High-speed Bomber Aviation Regiment	Junior Lieutenant	12 April 1942	—
Ivan Demyanenko; Russian: Иван Никитович Демьяненко	399th Howitzer Artillery Regiment	Senior Lieutenant	24 December 1943	—
Ilya Demchenko; Russian: Илья Сергеевич Демьяненко	384th Separate Marine Corps Battalion of the Black Sea Fleet	Red Fleet Man	20 April 1945 †	Killed in action on 27 March 1944
Sergey Demyanovsky; Russian: Сергей Григорьевич Демяновский	5th Guards Infantry Division	Guard Colonel	5 May 1945	—
Vladimir Denisenko; Russian: Владимир Гурьевич Денисенко	32nd Fighter Aviation Regiment	Lieutenant	1 July 1944	—
Grigory Denisenko; Russian: Григорий Кириллович Денисенко	235th Assault Aviation Regiment	Lieutenant	15 May 1946	—
Mikhail Denisenko; Russian: Михаил Иванович Денисенко	36th Guards Infantry Division	Guard Major-General	20 December 1943	—
Sergey Denisenko; Russian: Сергей Петрович Денисенко	957th Infantry Regiment	Lieutenant	23 October 1943	—
Aleksey Aleksandrovich Denisov; Russian: Алексей Александрович Денисов	61st Aviation Brigade of the Baltic Fleet	Major	21 April 1940	—
Aleksey Makarovich Denisov; Russian: Алексей Макарович Денисов	24th Guards Airborne Regiment	Guard Junior Lieutenant	20 December 1943 †	Killed in action on 6 October 1943
Aleksey Mikhailovich Denisov; Russian: Алексей Михайлович Денисов	32nd Guards Infantry Regiment	Guard Captain	15 January 1944	—
Anatoly Denisov; Russian: Анатолий Михайлович Денисов	1103rd Infantry Regiment	Captain	27 February 1945	—
Vyacheslav Denisov; Russian: Вячеслав Николаевич Денисов	4th Brigade of the Azov Flotilla	Guard Senior Lieutenant	22 January 1944 †	Killed in action on 6 November 1943
Georgy Denisov; Russian: Георгий Михайлович Денисов	83rd Assault Aviation Regiment	Major	29 June 1945	—
Ivan Denisov; Russian: Иван Фёдорович Денисов	102nd Guards Infantry Regiment	Guard Lieutenant	24 March 1945	—
Konstantin Denisov; Russian: Константин Дмитриевич Денисов	7th Fighter Aviation Regiment	Captain	23 October 1942	—
Maksim Denisov; Russian: Максим Яковлевич Денисов	29th Guards Motorized-Infantry Brigade	Guard Senior Lieutenant	10 April 1945	—
Mikhail Denisov; Russian: Михаил Игнатьевич Денисов	53rd Guards Tank Brigade	Guard Staff Sergeant	3 June 1944	—
Osin Denisov; Russian: Осип Андреевич Денисов	341st Guards Infantry Regiment	Guard Sergeant	24 March 1945	—
Sergey Yevdokimovich Denisov; Russian: Сергей Евдокимович Денисов	207th Guards Infantry Regiment	Guard Lieutenant	7 August 1943	—
Sergey Prokofevich Denisov; Russian: Сергей Прокофьевич Денисов	83rd Fighter Aviation Brigade of the Belorussian Military District; 7th Army	Captain; Commander	4 July 1937; 21 March 1940	Twice Hero of the Soviet Union
Fyodor Denisyuk; Russian: Фёдор Игнатьевич Денисюк	177th Infantry Regiment	Red Army Man	1 November 1943	—
Isay Denichenko; Russian: Исай Петрович Дениченко	2nd Mechanized Brigade of the 5th Mechanized Corps	Red Army Man	13 September 1944	—
Nikolai Denchik; Russian: Николай Фёдорович Денчик	64th Guards Fighter Aviation Regiment	Guard Senior Lieutenant	4 February 1944	—
Ivan Deputatov; Russian: Иван Степанович Депутатов	36th Guards Tank Brigade	Guard Junior Lieutenant	28 April 1945	—
Fyodor Derbushev; Russian: Фёдор Михайлович Дербушев	78th Guards Infantry Regiment	Red Army Guard	22 February 1944	—
Aleksey Dergach; Russian: Алексей Николаевич Дергач	86th Guards Fighter Aviation Regiment	Guard Captain	4 February 1944	—
Dmitry Dergachev; Russian: Дмитрий Андронович Дергачёв	1054th Artillery Regiment	Corporal	24 March 1945 †	Killed in action on 14 January 1945
Yegor Dergilev; Russian: Егор Иванович Дергилев	605th Infantry Regiment	Starshina	17 October 1943	—
Aleksey Derevyanko; Russian: Алексей Акимович Деревянко	47th Guards Infantry Regiment	Guard Junior Lieutenant	10 January 1944 †	Killed in action on 10 July 1943
Vasily Derevyanko; Russian: Василий Семёнович Деревянко	51st Guards Tank Regiment	Guard Senior Lieutenant	27 June 1945	—
Pavel Derzhavin; Russian: Павел Иванович Державин	Azov Flotilla	Captain 3rd Class	22 January 1944	—
Fyodor Derkach; Russian: Фёдор Григорьевич Деркач	1593rd Anti-tank Fighter Artillery Regiment	Senior Lieutenant	25 October 1943	—
Georgy Dermanovsky; Russian: Георгий Дмитриевич Дермановский	384th Separate Marine Corps Battalion of the Black Sea Fleet	Red Fleet Man	20 April 1945 †	Killed in action on 27 March 1944
Pyotr Dernov; Russian: Пётр Сергеевич Дернов	24th Guards Cavalry Regiment	Red Army Guard	24 March 1945 †	Killed in action on 24 January 1945
Grigory Dernovsky; Russian: Григорий Борисович Дерновский	1181st Anti-aircraft Artillery Regiment	Major	26 October 1943	—
Yevgeny Dertev; Russian: Евгений Александрович Дертев	1185th Infantry Regiment	Corporal	15 January 1944	—
Aleksey Deryugin; Russian: Алексей Васильевич Дерюгин	35th Tank Brigade	Junior Commander	21 March 1940	—
Aleksey Deryabin; Russian: Алексей Никитович Дерябин	15th Guards Assault Aviation Regiment	Guard Lieutenant	19 April 1945	—
Yuri Deryabin; Russian: Юрий Иванович Дерябин	93rd Cannon-Artillery Regiment	Lieutenant	20 December 1943	—
Pyotr Desnitsky; Russian: Пётр Павлович Десницкий	Radio Operator of a heavy bomber in the Spanish Civil War	Junior Commander	31 December 1936	—
Abdusalim Dehqonboyev; Uzbek: Abdusalim Dehqonboyev	467th Infantry Regiment	Red Army Man	15 January 1944	—
Andrey Dekhtyarenko; Russian: Андрей Николаевич Дехтяренко	580th Fighter Aviation Regiment	Senior Lieutenant	21 July 1942	—
Andrey Deshin; Russian: Андрей Иванович Дешин	6th Artillery Regiment	Corporal	16 October 1943 †	Killed in action on 21 September 1943
Ivan Deshin; Russian: Иван Семёнович Дешин	605th Infantry Regiment	Captain	24 March 1945	—
Nikolai Deshin; Russian: Николай Иванович Дешин	86th Guards Separate Anti-tank Fighter Division	Guard Staff Sergeant	31 May 1945	—
David Dzhabidze; Russian: Давид Васильевич Джабидзе	812nd Fighter Aviation Regiment	Captain	15 May 1946	—
Kamal Dzhamalov; Russian: Камал Давлятович Джамалов	8th Sapper Brigade	Red Army Man	26 October 1943	—
Kashagan Dzhamangaraev; Russian: Кашаган Джамангараев	1st Guards Cannon Artillery Brigade	Guard Staff Sergeant	17 October 1943	—
Tengiz Dzhaparidze; Russian: Тенгиз Иванович Джапаридзе	2nd Guards Tank Brigade	Guard Junior Sergeant	23 September 1944	—
Kazak Dzharkymbaev; Kyrgyz: Казак Жаркымбаев	287th Guards Infantry Regiment	Guard Junior Sergeant	24 March 1945	—
Israfil Dzhincharadze; Georgian: ისრაფილ ჯინჭარაძე	673rd Assault Aviation Regiment	Junior Lieutenant	4 February 1944 †	Killed in action on 15 October 1943
Lesbek Dzholdasov; Kazakh: Лесбек Бәйімбетұлы Жолдасов	1077th Infantry Regiment	Lieutenant	24 March 1945	—
Tashmamat Dzhumabaev; Russian: Ташмамат Джумабаев	685th Infantry Regiment	Sergeant	30 October 1943	
Elmurza Dzhumagulov; Russian: Эльмурза Биймурзаевич Джумагулов	42nd Separate Tank Regiment	Senior Lieutenant	26 September 1944	
Kilmash Dzhumaliev; Russian: Кильмаш Дюсегалиевич Джумалиев	267th Guards Infantry Regiment	Guard Junior Sergeant	27 February 1945	
Urazbay Dzhumanyazov; Russian: Уразбай Джуманьязов	985th Infantry Regiment	Red Army Man	17 October 1943	—
Galina Dzhunkovskaya; Russian: Галина Ивановна Джунковская	125th Guards Dive Bomber Aviation Regiment	Guard Senior Lieutenant	18 August 1945	—
Mazhit Dzhunusov; Russian: Мажит Джунусов	45th Infantry Regiment	Starshina	20 December 1943	—
Mikhail Dzigunsky; Russian: Михаил Яковлевич Дзигунский	1372nd Infantry Regiment	Lieutenant	24 March 1945 †	Killed in action on 7 May 1944
Ibragim Dzusov; Russian: Ибрагим Магометович Дзусов; Iron Ossetic: Ибрагим Дзусты	6th Fighter Aviation Corps	Guard Major-General	29 May 1945	—
Ivan Dzyuba; Russian: Иван Михайлович Дзюба; Ukrainian: Іван Михайлович Дзюба	12th Fighter Aviation Regiment	Major	21 July 1942	—
Pyotr Dzyuba; Russian: Пётр Петрович Дзюба	85th Guards Fighter Aviation Regiment	Guard Captain	1 November 1943	—
Daniil Dzyubanov; Russian: Даниил Титович Дзюбанов	732nd Infantry Regiment	Captain	29 June 1945	—
Mikhail Diasamidze; Russian: Михаил Степанович Диасамидзе; Georgian: დიასამიძე მიხეილ	1378th Infantry Regiment	Lieutenant Colonel	22 December 1942	—
Kirill Dibrov; Russian: Кирилл Селиверстович Дибров	393rd Separate Marine Corps Battalion of the Black Sea Fleet	Junior Lieutenant	31 May 1944	—
Filipp Dibrov; Russian: Филипп Давыдович Дибров	1271st Infantry Regiment	Captain	24 March 1945	—
Aleksandr Divochkin; Russian: Александр Андреевич Дивочкин	15th Motorized-Infantry Regiment	Junior Lieutenant	26 August 1941	—
Gavriil Didenko; Russian: Гавриил Власович Диденко	482nd Fighter Aviation Regiment	Major	10 April 1945	—
Laniil Didenko; Russian: Даниил Григорьевич Диденко	35th Light Tank Brigade	Starshina	21 March 1940	—
Nikolai Didenko; Russian: Николай Матвеевич Диденко	2nd Guards Fighter Aviation Regiment	Guard Senior Lieutenant	5 November 1944	—
Yakov Didok; Russian: Яков Терентьевич Дидок	286th Guards Anti-aircraft Artillery Regiment	Red Army Guard	23 September 1944	—
Stepan Dikalov; Russian: Степан Иванович Дикалов	86th Infantry Regiment	Staff Sergeant	29 October 1943	—
Viktor Dikarev; Russian: Виктор Михайлович Дикарев	17th Guards Mechanized Brigade	Guard Captain	10 April 1945	—
Mikhail Diky; Russian: Михаил Прокофьевич Дикий	236th Fighter Aviation Division	Captain	1 May 1943	—
Yevgeny Dokopoltsev; Russian: Евгений Александрович Дикопольцев	235th Guards Infantry Regiment	Guard Sergeant	26 October 1943	—
Georgy Dikun; Russian: Георгий Васильевич Дикун	16th Guards Separate Motorized Infantry Battalion	Guard Major	24 March 1945	—
Korney Dityuk; Russian: Корней Корнеевич Дитюк	5th Motorized-Infantry Brigade	Major	24 March 1945	—
Aleksandr Pavlovich Dmitriev; Russian: Александр Павлович Дмитриев	55th Guards Tank Brigade	Guard Lieutenant Colonel	27 June 1945	—
Aleksey Petrovich Dmitriev; Russian: Алексей Петрович Дмитриев	127th Guards Infantry Regiment	Guard Major	23 October 1943	—
Aleksey Fyodorovich Dmitriev; Russian: Алексей Фёдорович Дмитриев	214th Guards Howitzer Artillery Regiment	Guard Captain	24 March 1945	—
Vasily Antonovich Dmitriev; Russian: Василий Антонович Дмитриев	507th Anti-tank Fighter Artillery Regiment	Lieutenant Colonel	24 March 1945	—
Vasily Petrovich Dmitriev; Russian: Василий Петрович Дмитриев	267th Infantry Division	Commissar	21 February 1944 †	Killed in action on 7 April 1942
Grigory Dmitriev; Russian: Григорий Яковлевич Дмитриев	696th Separate Sapper Battalion	Junior Sergeant	30 October 1943	—
Ivan Dmitriev; Russian: Иван Иванович Дмитриев	135th Separate Motorized Pontoon-and-Bridge Battalion	Lieutenant	10 January 1944	—
Maksim Dmitriev; Russian: Максим Васильевич Дмитриев	109th Separate Reconnaissance Battalion	Starshina	21 March 1940	—
Nikolai Mikhailovich Dmitriev; Russian: Николай Михайлович Дмитриев	123rd Separate Anti-tank Fighter Division	Red Army Man	31 August 1941	—
Nikolai Pavlovich Dmitriev; Russian: Николай Павлович Дмитриев	5th Guards Fighter Aviation Regiment	Guard Captain	24 August 1943	—
Pavel Dmitriev; Russian: Павел Павлович Дмитриев	42nd Infantry Regiment	Starshina	24 March 1945	—
Pyotr Dmitrievich Dmitriev; Russian: Пётр Дмитриевич Дмитриев	911th Artillery Regiment	Major	10 January 1944	—
Pyotr Dmitrievich Dmitriev; Russian: Пётр Дмитриевич Дмитриев	212th Infantry Regiment	Captain	27 February 1945	—
Fyodor Dmitriev; Russian: Фёдор Павлович Дмитриев	936th Infantry Regiment	Staff Sergeant	13 September 1944	—
Filipp Dmitriev; Russian: Филипп Дмитриевич Дмитриев	616th Artillery Regiment	Lieutenant	24 March 1945	—
Boris Dmitrievsky; Russian: Борис Николаевич Дмитриевский	3rd Guards Tank Brigade	Guard Senior Lieutenant	29 June 1945 †	Died of wounds on 11 March 1945
Pyotr Dmitrik; Russian: Пётр Федосеевич Дмитрик	920th Infantry Regiment	Sergeant	24 March 1945	—
Grigory Dmitryuk; Russian: Григорий Федосеевич Дмитрюк	19th Guards Fighter Aviation Regiment	Guard Captain	2 November 1944	—
Pyotr Dneprov; Russian: Пётр Алексеевич Днепров	44th Guards Tank Brigade	Guard Captain	27 February 1945	—
Pyotr Dneprovsky; Russian: Пётр Павлович Днепровский	62nd Guards Separate Sapper Battalion	Guard Sergeant	24 April 1944 †	Killed in action on 19 October 1943
Aleksandr Dobkevich; Russian: Александр Антонович Добкевич	61st Assault Aviation Regiment	Captain	13 April 1944	—
Ivan Dobrikov; Russian: Иван Андреевич Добриков	1131st Infantry Regiment	Captain	10 January 1944	—
Yerofey Dobrovolsky; Russian: Ерофей Владимирович Добровольский	16th Infantry Corps	Guard Major-General	6 April 1945	—
Anatoly Dobrodetsky; Russian: Анатолий Васильевич Добродецкий	297th Fighter Aviation Regiment	Junior Lieutenant	4 February 1944 †	Killed in action on 10 August 1943 while performing an aerial ramming
Grigory Dobrodomov; Russian: Григорий Сергеевич Добродомов	764th Infantry Regiment	Red Army Man	10 January 1944	—
Vasily Dobrorez; Russian: Василий Павлович Доброрез	16th Assault Engineer-Sapper Brigade	Staff Sergeant	10 April 1945	—
Vladimir Dobrosotskikh; Russian: Владимир Митрофанович Добросоцких	1040th Infantry Regiment	Captain	3 June 1944	—
Grigory Dobrunov; Russian: Григорий Тимофеевич Добрунов	99th Separate Reconnaissance Battalion	Guard Lieutenant Colonel	18 December 1956	—
Mikhail Dobrynin; Russian: Михаил Семёнович Добрынин	538th Infantry Regiment	Corporal	10 April 1945	—
Lev Dovator; Russian: Лев Михайлович Доватор	2nd Guards Cavalry Corps	Guard Major-General	21 December 1941 †	Killed in action on 19 December 1941
Savely Dovgopoly; Russian: Савелий Денисович Довгополый	10th Guards Infantry Regiment	Guard Staff Sergeant	16 October 1943	—
Viktor Dovzhenko; Russian: Виктор Михайлович Довженко	1281st Infantry Regiment	Senior Lieutenant	27 February 1945	—
Berdimurat Dovletdzhanov; Russian: Бердимурат Довлетджанов	62nd Guards Cavalry Regiment	Red Army Guard	15 January 1944	—
Aleksey Dogadaylo; Russian: Алексей Дмитриевич Догадайло	177th Guards Fighter Aviation Regiment	Guard Senior Lieutenant	15 May 1946	—
Vladimir Dogaev; Russian: Владимир Иванович Догаев	622nd Assault Aviation Regiment	Senior Lieutenant	26 October 1944	—
Pyotr Dodogorsky; Russian: Пётр Викторович Додогорский	961st Infantry Regiment	Colonel	24 March 1945	—
Aleksandr Dodonov; Russian: Александр Сергеевич Додонов	746th Aviation Regiment	Major	25 March 1943	—
David Doev; Russian: Давид Тебоевич Доев	1133rd Infantry Regiment	Starshina	16 May 1944 †	Killed in action on 12 November 1943
Fyodor Dozortsev; Russian: Фёдор Иванович Дозорцев	29th Guards Motorized-Infantry Brigade	Guard Captain	10 April 1945	—
Vadim Doychev; Russian: Вадим Пантелеймонович Дойчев	75th Guards Assault Aviation Regiment	Guard Senior Lieutenant	19 April 1945	—
Nikolai Dokashenko; Russian: Николай Григорьевич Докашенко	17th Fighter Aviation Regiment	Captain	22 April 1952	—
Sergey Dokin; Russian: Сергей Иванович Докин	1955th Anti-tank Fighter Artillery Regiment	Staff Sergeant	15 May 1946	—
Ivan Dokukin; Russian: Иван Архипович Докукин	504th Assault Aviation Regiment	Lieutenant	8 February 1943	—
Georgy Dokuchaev; Russian: Георгий Николаевич Докучаев	127th Guards Infantry Regiment	Guard Junior Lieutenant	13 September 1944	—
Mikhail Pavlovich Dokuchaev; Russian: Михаил Павлович Докучаев	1266th Infantry Regiment	Major	24 March 1945	—
Mikhail Stepanovich Dokuchaev; Russian: Михаил Степанович Докучаев	55th Guards Cavalry Regiment	Guard Sergeant	27 February 1945	—
Nikolai Dokuchaev; Russian: Николай Егорович Докучаев	85th Separate Motorized Pontoon-Bridge Battalion	Senior Lieutenant	15 January 1944	—
Pavel Dokuchalov; Russian: Павел Семёнович Докучалов	175th Guards Assault Aviation Regiment	Guard Senior Lieutenant	15 May 1946	—
Pyotr Dolbyoshkin; Russian: Пётр Лукич Долбёшкин	272nd Guards Mortar Regiment	Guard Captain	17 November 1943 †	Killed in action on 3 October 1943
Ivan Dolganov; Russian: Иван Иосифович Долганов	534th Anti-tank Fighter Artillery Regiment	Staff Sergeant	24 March 1945	—
Pavel Dolgarev; Russian: Павел Михайлович Долгарёв	116th Fighter Aviation Regiment	Lieutenant	29 June 1945	—
Boris Dolgy; Russian: Долгий Борис Семёнович	451st Artillery Regiment	Senior Lieutenant	11 April 1940 †	Killed in action on 10 February 1940
Stepan Dolgy; Russian: Степан Иванович Долгий	297th Separate Anti-tank Fighter Battalion	Staff Sergeant	16 October 1943 †	Killed in action on 16 September 1943
Pyotr Dolgikh; Russian: Пётр Николаевич Долгих	107th Guards Anti-tank Fighter Artillery Regiment	Red Army Guard	1 November 1943	—
Aleksandr Dolgov; Russian: Александр Петрович Долгов	8th Guards Separate Motorized Infantry Battalion	Guard Senior Lieutenant	31 May 1945	—
Vladimir Dolgov; Russian: Владимир Константинович Долгов	213th Guards Infantry Regiment	Guard Lieutenant	24 March 1945 †	Killed in action on 24 June 1944
Grigory Dolgov; Russian: Григорий Афанасьевич Долгов	201st Guards Infantry Regiment	Guard Junior Lieutenant	22 July 1944 †	Killed in action on 24 June 1944
Ivan Illarionovich Dolgov; Russian: Иван Илларионович Долгов	715th Assault Aviation Regiment	Lieutenant	29 June 1945	—
Ivan Nikolaevich Dolgov; Russian: Иван Николаевич Долгов	734th Infantry Regiment	Lieutenant Colonel	28 April 1945	—
Pyotr Dolgov; Russian: Пётр Иванович Долгов	Parachute instructor	Colonel	12 December 1962 †	Died during a parachute jump on 1 November 1962
Semyon Dolgov; Russian: Семён Дмитриевич Долгов	931st Infantry Regiment	Staff Sergeant	13 November 1943	—
Vasily Dolgopolov; Russian: Василий Иванович Долгополов	257th Separate Reconnaissance Company	Staff Sergeant	24 March 1945	—
Sergey Dolgushin; Russian: Сергей Фёдорович Долгушин	180th Fighter Aviation Regiment	Lieutenant	5 May 1942	—
Nikolai Dolzhansky; Russian: Николай Иванович Должанский	165th Guards Assault Aviation Regiment	Guard Lieutenant	26 October 1944	—
Yuri Dolzhansky; Russian: Юрий Моисеевич Должанский	10th Guards Infantry Regiment	Guard Senior Lieutenant	16 October 1943	—
Igor Dolzhenkov; Russian: Игорь Павлович Долженков	492nd Anti-tank Fighter Artillery Regiment	Senior Lieutenant	1 November 1943	—
Sergey Dolzhenkov; Russian: Сергей Аниканович Долженков	248th Infantry Regiment	Captain	22 February 1944	—
Frol Dolidovich; Russian: Фрол Савельевич Долидович	53rd Guards Tank Brigade	Red Army Guard	10 April 1945	—
Mariya Dolina; Russian: Мария Ивановна Долина	125th Guards Dive Bomber Aviation Regiment	Guard Captain	18 August 1945	—
Sergey Dolinsky; Russian: Сергей Андреевич Долинский	569th Assault Aviation Regiment	Junior Lieutenant	18 August 1945	—
Ivan Dombrovsky; Russian: Иван Александрович Домбровский	167th Guards Assault Aviation Regiment	Guard Captain	18 August 1945	—
Vasily Domnikov; Russian: Василий Михайлович Домников	34th Guards Bomber Aviation Regiment	Guard Captain	29 June 1945	—
Pavel Domnin; Russian: Павел Иванович Домнин	985th Infantry Regiment	Sergeant	17 October 1943	—
Yegor Domnich; Russian: Егор Петрович Домнич	936th Infantry Regiment	Staff Sergeant	22 February 1944	—
Mikhail Domozhakov; Russian: Михаил Егорович Доможаков	957th Infantry Regiment	Red Army Man	23 October 1943	—
Aleksandr Domrachev; Russian: Александр Васильевич Домрачев	23rd Guards Light Artillery Brigade	Guard Colonel	24 December 1943	—
Zakhar Dony; Russian: Захар Афанасьевич Доний	124th Howitzer Artillery Regiment	Starshina	11 April 1940	—
Aleksandr Donskikh; Russian: Александр Иванович Донских	740th Infantry Regiment	Staff Sergeant	24 March 1945	—
Ivan Donskikh; Russian: Иван Григорьевич Донских	538th Mortar Regiment	Senior Lieutenant	31 May 1945	—
Maksim Dontsov; Russian: Максим Иванович Донцов	312th Infantry Regiment	Senior Lieutenant	19 April 1945	—
Vasily Donchuk; Russian: Василий Иванови Дончук	108th Separate Reconnaissance Aviation Squadron	Major	2 November 1944 †	Killed in action on 21 October 1944
Maksim Dorikov; Russian: Максим Григорьевич Дориков	280th Separate Communications Battalion	Corporal	10 April 1945	—
Nikolai Dorovsky; Russian: Николай Степанович Доровский	199th Guards Infantry Regiment	Guard Lieutenant	22 July 1944 †	Killed in action on 25 June 1944
Vasily Doronin; Russian: Василий Александрович Доронин	28th Tank Regiment	Guard Senior Lieutenant	24 May 1944	—
Aleksandr Ivanovich Dorofeev; Russian: Александр Иванович Дорофеев	185th Guards Infantry Regiment	Guard Lieutenant	22 February 1944	—
Aleksandr Petrovich Dorofeev; Russian: Александр Петрович Дорофеев	295th Infantry Division	Colonel	19 March 1944	—
Ivan Dorofeev; Russian: Иван Николаевич Дорофеев	100th Guards Infantry Regiment	Guard Lieutenant	24 March 1945	—
Ivan Nikitovich Dorokhin; Russian: Иван Никитович Дорохин	713rd Self-propelled Artillery Regiment	Junior Lieutenant	23 August 1944 †	Killed in action on 25 June 1944
Ivan Sergeevich Dorokhin; Russian: Иван Сергеевич Дорохин	86th Infantry Regiment	Senior Lieutenant	10 January 1944	—
Nikolai Dorokhov; Russian: Николай Яковлевич Дорохов	104th Guards Infantry Regiment	Guard Sergeant	22 February 1944	—
Yuri Dorosh; Russian: Юрий Порфирьевич Дорош	1052nd Infantry Regiment	Sergeant	27 February 1945	—
Pavel Doroshenko; Russian: Павел Яковлевич Дорошенко	955th Assault Aviation Regiment	Senior Lieutenant	1 July 1944	—
Trofim Doroshenko; Russian: Трофим Тихонович Дорошенко	203rd Guards Infantry Regiment	Guard Sergeant	16 October 1943	—
Semyon Dostovalov; Russian: Семён Васильевич Достовалов	900th Mountain-Infantry Regiment	Red Army Man	24 March 1945 †	Killed in action on 22 September 1944
Vasily Dotsenko; Russian: Василий Данилович Доценко	330th Infantry Regiment	Commissar	21 March 1940	—
Dmitry Dotsenko; Russian: Дмитрий Степанович Доценко	1075th Anti-tank Fighter Artillery Regiment	Senior Lieutenant	10 April 1945	—
Iosif Dotsenko; Russian: Иосиф Трофимович Доценко	271st Infantry Regiment	Senior Lieutenant	16 October 1943 †	Killed in action on 28 September 1943
Stepan Dotsenko; Russian: Степан Матвеевич Доценко	185th Guards Infantry Regiment	Red Army Guard	22 February 1944	—
Taras Dotsenko; Russian: Тарас Степанович Доценко	1118th Infantry Regiment	Senior Lieutenant	22 February 1944	—
Vladimir Dragomiretsky; Russian: Владимир Порфирьевич Драгомирецкий	337th Aviation Regiment	Guard Major	5 November 1944	—
Nikolai Dragunov; Russian: Николай Петрович Драгунов	77th Guards Separate Reconnaissance Company	Red Army Guard	26 October 1943	—
David Dragunsky; Russian: Давид Абрамович Драгунский	55th Guards Tank Brigade	Guard Colonel	23 September 1944; 31 May 1945	Twice Hero of the Soviet Union
Yevgeny Dranishchev; Russian: Евгений Петрович Дранищев	9th Guards Fighter Aviation Regiment	Guard Senior Lieutenant	24 August 1943	—
Pyotr Dranko; Russian: Пётр Александрович Дранко	89th Guards Fighter Aviation Regiment	Guard Major	2 September 1943	—
Ivan Drachenko; Russian: Иван Григорьевич Драченко	140th Guards Assault Aviation Regiment	Guard Junior Lieutenant	26 October 1944	—
Ivan Drebot; Russian: Иван Захарович Дребот	168th Infantry Regiment	Junior Commander	11 April 1940	—
Vasily Dreval; Russian: Василий Тимофеевич Древаль	78th Guards Infantry Regiment	Guard Captain	22 February 1944	—
Dmitry Dryomin; Russian: Дмитрий Феоктистович Дрёмин	309th Infantry Division	Major-General	23 October 1943	—
Ivan Dryomov; Russian: Иван Фёдорович Дрёмов	8th Guards Mechanized Corps	Guard Major-General	26 April 1944	—
Ivan Drizhenko; Russian: Иван Алексеевич Дриженко	8th Engineer-Sapper Brigade	Senior Lieutenant	26 October 1943	—
Semyon Drizovsky; Russian: Семён Борисович Дризовский	385th Infantry Regiment	Senior Lieutenant	17 October 1943	—
Nikolai Drikalovich; Russian: Николай Николаевич Дрикалович	161st Separate Guards Cannon Artillery Regiment	Guard Senior Lieutenant	26 October 1943	—
Savely Drin; Russian: Савелий Григорьевич Дринь	740th Infantry Regiment	Red Army Man	23 August 1944 †	Killed in action on 25 June 1944
Anatoly Drobakha; Russian: Анатолий Иванович Дробаха	823rd Artillery Regiment	Starshina	24 March 1945	—
Vasily Drobyazko; Russian: Василий Иосифович Дробязко	1st Guards Infantry Regiment	Guard Corporal	16 May 1944	—
Vladimir Drovnik; Russian: Владимир Михайлович Дровник	262nd Guards Infantry Regiment	Guard Junior Sergeant	19 April 1945	—
Mikhail Drozhzhin; Russian: Михаил Петрович Дрожжин	37th Guards Infantry Regiment	Guard Sergeant	31 May 1945	—
Pyotr Drozdov; Russian: Пётр Владимирович Дроздов	19th Mechanized Brigade	Junior Lieutenant	20 December 1943	—
Nikita Dronov; Russian: Никита Дорофеевич Дронов	170th Guards Infantry Regiment	Guard Lieutenant Colonel	24 March 1945	—
Mikhail Druzhinin; Russian: Михаил Иванович Дружинин	61st Guards Infantry Regiment	Guard Lieutenant	24 March 1945	—
Nikolai Druzhinin; Russian: Николай Иванович Дружинин	310th Infantry Regiment	Red Army Man	16 October 1943	—
Nikolai Druzdev; Russian: Николай Игнатьевич Друздев	34th ближнеBomber Aviation Regiment	Captain	14 September 1945	—
Vasily Drygin; Russian: Василий Михайлович Дрыгин	298th Fighter Aviation Regiment	Captain	24 May 1943	—
Mikhail Dryanichkin; Russian: Михаил Ефимович Дряничкин	904th Infantry Regiment	Captain	10 April 1945 †	Killed in action on 31 January 1945
Grigory Dub; Russian: Григорий Моисеевич Дуб	1001st Infantry Regiment	Staff Sergeant	24 March 1945	—
Aleksandr Dubenko; Russian: Александр Васильевич Дубенко	622nd Assault Aviation Regiment	Senior Lieutenant	26 October 1944	—
Gennady Dubenok; Russian: Геннадий Сергеевич Дубенок	53rd Guards Fighter Aviation Regiment	Guard Captain	24 August 1943	—
Andrey Dubikov; Russian: Андрей Елиферович Дубиков	73rd Guards Separate Anti-Tank Fighter Division	Guard Junior Sergeant	22 July 1944	—
Ibragim Dubin; Russian: Ибрагим Хусаинович Дубин	360th Infantry Regiment	Junior Lieutenant	16 October 1943	—
Pyotr Dubinda; Russian: Пётр Прокофьевич Дубина	2nd Mechanized Brigade	Red Army Man	13 September 1944	—
Pavel Dubinda; Russian: Павел Христофорович Дубинда	293rd Guards Infantry Regiment	Guard Starshina	29 June 1945	—
Andrey Dubinets; Russian: Андрей Петрович Дубинец	1st Motorized-Infantry Division	Lieutenant	15 August 1941	—
Vasily Dubinin; Russian: Василий Михайлович Дубинин	24th Guards Infantry Regiment	Guard Junior Sergeant	22 February 1943	—
Yefim Dubinin; Russian: Ефим Иванович Дубинин	1666th Anti-tank Fighter Artillery Regiment	Staff Sergeant	10 January 1944	—
Ivan Dubinin; Russian: Иван Владимирович Дубинин	70th Guards Infantry Regiment	Red Army Guard	24 March 1945 †	Killed in action on 9 May 1944
Ivan Dubinsky; Russian: Иван Яковлевич Дубинский	759th Infantry Regiment	Red Army Man	13 September 1944	—
Nikolai Dubkovsky; Russian: Николай Андреевич Дубковский	386th Separate Marine Corps Battalion of the Black Sea Fleet	Red Fleet Man	17 November 1943	—
Ivan Dubovoy; Russian: Иван Васильевич Дубовой	16th Tank Corps	Major-General	11 March 1944	—
Pyotr Dubrivny; Russian: Пётр Савельевич Дубривный	99th Guards Artillery Regiment	Guard Staff Sergeant	31 May 1945	—
Mikhail Dubrovin; Russian: Михаил Яковлевич Дубровин	696th Anti-tank Fighter Artillery Regiment	Captain	24 March 1945 †	Killed in action on 21 July 1944
Georgy Dubrovsky; Russian: Георгий Алексеевич Дубровский	850th Infantry Regiment	Major	24 March 1945	—
Nikolai Dubynin; Russian: Николай Михайлович Дубынин	87th Separate Pontoon-Bridge Battalion	Staff Sergeant	29 June 1945	—
Ivan Dubyaga; Russian: Иван Романович Дубяга	Submarine K-115	Captain 2nd Class	18 February 1964	—
Nikolai Dugin; Russian: Николай Дмитриевич Дугин	402nd Fighter Aviation Regiment	Captain	15 May 1946 †	Died of wounds on 2 May 1945
Aleksandr Dudakov; Russian: Александр Васильевич Дудаков	15th Guards Bomber Aviation Regiment	Guard Major	23 February 1948	—
Pavel Dudarev; Russian: Павел Иванович Дударев	681st Infantry Regiment	Red Army Man	13 September 1944	—
Andrey Dudarenko; Russian: Андрей Емельянович Дударенко	15th Guards Mortar Brigade	Guard Major	6 April 1945 †	Killed in action on 27 January 1945
Mikhail Dudarenko; Russian: Михаил Тарасович Дударенко	222nd Infantry Regiment	Senior Lieutenant	7 April 1940 †	Killed in action on 6 December 1939
Nikolai Dudetsky; Russian: Николай Митрофанович Дудецкий	498th Infantry Regiment	Lieutenant Colonel	6 April 1945	—
Aleksandr Dudin; Russian: Александр Протальонович Дудин	692nd Artillery Regiment	Junior Lieutenant	10 January 1944	—
Leonid Dudin; Russian: Леонид Никитович Дудин	81st Guards Infantry Regiment	Guard Major	22 February 1944	—
Nikolai Dudin; Russian: Николай Максимович Дудин	29th Fighter Aviation Regiment	Commissar	22 October 1941	—
Luka Dudka; Russian: Лука Минович Дудка	748th Infantry Regiment	Lieutenant Colonel	25 October 1943	—
Nikolai Dudka; Russian: Николай Николаевич Дудка	4th понтонно-мостовой Brigade	Guard Junior Sergeant	22 February 1944	—
Aleksandr Grigorevich Dudkin; Russian: Александр Григорьевич Дудкин	262nd Infantry Regiment	Senior Lieutenant	24 March 1945	—
Aleksandr Pavlovich Dudkin; Russian: Александр Павлович Дудкин	166th Guards Assault Aviation Regiment	Guard Senior Lieutenant	26 October 1944	—
Fyodor Dudko; Russian: Фёдор Михайлович Дудко	20th Tank Brigade	Military technician 1st Class	21 March 1940 †	Died of wounds on 11 February 1940
Fyodor Dudnik; Russian: Фёдор Федотович Дудник	5th Guards Aviation Regiment	Guard Captain	18 September 1943	—
Georgy Dudnikov; Russian: Георгий Георгиевич Дудников	1st Riverboat Brigade of the Dnieper Military Flotilla	Foreman 1st Class	31 May 1945 †	Died of wounds on 23 April 1945
Viktor Dudnichenko; Russian: Виктор Маркович Дудниченко	239th Fighter Aviation Regiment	Senior Lieutenant	1 July 1944	—
Ivan Dudchenko; Russian: Иван Андреевич Дудченко	176th Guards Infantry Regiment	Guard Captain	24 March 1945 †	Killed in action on 5 December 1944
Pavel Dudchik; Russian: Павел Андреевич Дудчик	699th Anti-tank Fighter Artillery Regiment	Captain	29 June 1945	—
Yevgeny Dudykin; Russian: Евгений Петрович Дудыкин	592nd Infantry Regiment	Red Army Man	19 March 1944	—
Vasily Duenko; Russian: Василий Григорьевич Дулебо	645th Infantry Regiment	Senior Lieutenant	24 March 1945 †	Captured and executed on 21 August 1944
Anton Dulebo; Russian: Антон Николаевич Дулебо	56th Guards Cavalry Regiment	Guard Senior Lieutenant	27 February 1945	—
Ivan Dunaev; Russian: Иван Васильевич Дунаев	Reconnaissance squad of the 18th Tank Corps	Lieutenant	10 March 1944 †	Killed in action on 18 October 1943
Mikhail Dunaev; Russian: Михаил Никитович Дунаев	125th Guards Artillery Regiment	Guard Lieutenant	19 April 1945 †	Killed in action on 14 January 1945
Nikolai Dunaev; Russian: Николай Пантелеевич Дунаев	270th Fighter Aviation Regiment	Captain	2 September 1943	—
Sergey Dunaev; Russian: Сергей Илларионович Дунаев	108th Guards Infantry Division	Guard Colonel	28 April 1945	—
Konstantin Dunaevsky; Russian: Константин Дмитриевич Дунаевский	47th Guards Separate Reconnaissance Aviation Regiment	Guard Senior Lieutenant	18 August 1945	—
Nikolai Dunichev; Russian: Николай Васильевич Дуничев	334th Infantry Regiment	Red Army Man	24 March 1945 †	Killed in action on 25 June 1945
Ivan Duply; Russian: Иван Минович Дуплий	55th Guards Tank Brigade	Guard Starshina	3 June 1944	—
Sergey Duply; Russian: Сергей Прокофьевич Дуплий	5th Guards Mine-Torpedo Aviation Regiment	Guard Major	5 November 1944	—
Valentin Durakov; Russian: Валентин Фёдорович Дураков	999th Assault Aviation Regiment	Major	29 June 1945	—
Anton Durachenko; Russian: Антон Николаевич Дураченко	465th Infantry Regiment	Red Army Man	13 November 1943	—
Kochkar Durdiev; Russian: Кочкар Ахмедович Дурдиев	353rd Mountain-Infantry Regiment	Red Army Man	27 March 1942	—
Kurban Durdy; Russian: Курбан Дурды	389th Infantry Regiment	Junior Sergeant	9 November 1941	—
Redzhep Durdyev; Russian: Реджеп Дурдыев	56th Guards Cavalry Regiment	Red Army Guard	27 February 1945	—
Aleksandr Durin; Russian: Александр Максимович Дурин	109th Infantry Regiment	Staff Sergeant	16 October 1943 †	Killed in action on 13 September 1943
Ivan Durnov; Russian: Иван Алексеевич Дурнов	81st Guards Infantry Regiment	Red Army Guard	22 February 1944	—
Abu Dusukhambetov; Russian: Абу Дусухамбетов	229th Infantry Regiment	Senior Lieutenant	16 October 1943	—
Pyotr Dutov; Russian: Пётр Данилович Дутов	1075th Infantry Regiment	Red Army Man	21 July 1942 †	Killed in action on 16 November 1941. One of Panfilov's Twenty-Eight Guardsmen
Aleksey Dukhov; Russian: Алексей Михайлович Духов	1st Guards Tank Brigade	Guard Senior Lieutenant	27 February 1945	—
Nikolai Dushak; Russian: Николай Григорьевич Душак	12th Guards Tank Brigade	Guard Colonel	31 May 1945	—
Vladimir Dushein; Russian: Владимир Васильевич Душеин	3rd Guards Motorized Infantry Brigade	Guard Corporal	27 June 1945	—
Ivan Dushkin; Russian: Иван Ефимович Душкин	10th Guards Aviation Regiment	Guard Senior Lieutenant	18 September 1943 †	Killed in action on 8 August 1943
Ivan Dushkin; Russian: Иван Иванович Душкин	Spanish Civil War aviation squadron	Senior Lieutenant	14 March 1938	—
Aleksandr Dydyshko; Russian: Александр Иванович Дыдышко	301st Howitzer Artillery Regiment	Captain	11 April 1940	—
Pyotr Dymchenko; Russian: Пётр Леонтьевич Дымченко	659th Fighter Aviation Regiment	Lieutenant	14 February 1943 †	Killed in action on 10 November 1942
Yefim Dyskin; Russian: Ефим Анатольевич Дыскин	694th Anti-tank Fighter Artillery Regiment	Red Army Man	12 April 1942	—
Aleksandr Dytchenko; Russian: Александр Степанович Дытченко	1493rd Self-propelled-Artillery Regiment	Lieutenant Colonel	27 February 1945	—
Vasily Dytyuk; Russian: Василий Кузьмич Дытюк	66th Guards Tank Brigade	Guard Lieutenant	24 March 1945	—
Vladimir Dyshinsky; Russian: Владимир Александрович Дышинский	96th Guards Separate Reconnaissance Company	Guard Junior Lieutenant	20 December 1943	—
Iosif Dyakonov; Russian: Иосиф Иванович Дьяков	494th Infantry Regiment	Senior Lieutenant	24 March 1945	—
Pyotr Dyakov; Russian: Пётр Михайлович Дьяков	683rd Assault Aviation Regiment	Senior Lieutenant	18 August 1945	—
Anatoly Dyakonov; Russian: Анатолий Александрович Дьяконов	60th Separate Ski Battalion	Captain	21 March 1940	—
Yefim Dyakonov; Russian: Ефрем Аристаулович Дьяконов	27th Infantry Regiment	Junior Commander	21 March 1940	—
Nikita Dyakonov; Russian: Никита Николаевич Дьяконов	672nd Assault Aviation Regiment	Lieutenant	4 February 1944	—
Nikolai Dyakonov; Russian: Николай Максимович Дьяконов	415th Infantry Regiment	Red Army Man	24 March 1945	—
Andrey Dyachenko; Russian: Андрей Васильевич Дьяченко	1318th Infantry Regiment	Red Army Man	10 January 1944	—
Ivan Davidovich Dyachenko; Russian: Иван Давидович Дьяченко	1318th Infantry Regiment	Red Army Man	29 October 1943	—
Ivan Korneevich Dyachenko; Russian: Иван Корнеевич Дьяченко	738th Infantry Regiment	Senior Lieutenant	27 February 1945	—
Ivan Mikhailovich Dyachenko; Russian: Иван Михайлович Дьяченко	237th Assault Aviation Regiment	Captain	18 August 1945	—
Nikolai Dyachenko; Russian: Николай Сидорович Дьяченко	524th Infantry Regiment	Senior Lieutenant	10 April 1945 †	Killed in action on 24 January 1945
Fyodor Sergeevich Dyachenko; Russian: Фёдор Сергеевич Дьяченко	Patrol Boat “СКА-018” of the Black Sea Fleet	Lieutenant Captain	22 January 1944	—
Fyodor Trofimovich Dyachenko; Russian: Фёдор Трофимович Дьяченко	187th Infantry Regiment	Staff Sergeant	21 February 1944	—
Aleksandr Dyakov; Russian: Александр Алексеевич Дьячков	179th Guards Fighter Aviation Regiment	Guard Senior Lieutenant	15 May 1946 †	Killed in a plane crash on 31 March 1945
Aleksey Dyachkov; Russian: Алексей Фёдорович Дьячков	384th Artillery Regiment	Senior Lieutenant	30 October 1943	—
Fyodor Dyachkov; Russian: Фёдор Васильевич Дьячков	47th Guards Tank Brigade	Guard Starshina	27 February 1945	—
Andrey Dyachuk; Russian: Андрей Ефимович Дьячук	51st Engineer-Sapper Brigade	Staff Sergeant	24 March 1945	—
Anatoly Dyubko; Russian: Анатолий Фёдорович Дюбко	589th Light Artillery Regiment	Lieutenant	24 March 1945	—
Georgy Dyudyukin; Russian: Георгий Константинович Дюдюкин	82nd Guards Separate Anti-tank Fighter Division	Guard Staff Sergeant	31 May 1945	—
Mikhail Dyuzhev; Russian: Михаил Константинович Дюжев	240th Infantry Regiment	Sergeant	27 February 1945	—
Daniil Dyaditsyn; Russian: Даниил Степанович Дядицын	19th Guards Airborne Regiment	Guard Lieutenant	20 December 1943	—
Mikhail Dyakin; Russian: Михаил Васильевич Дякин	229th Guards Infantry Regiment	Guard Captain	26 October 1943	—
Nikolai Dyakin; Russian: Николай Петрович Дякин	5th Guards Mechanized Corps	Guard Colonel	27 June 1945 †	Killed in action on 23 April 1945
Aleksandr Dyatlov; Russian: Александр Иванович Дятлов	87th Guards Infantry Regiment	Guard Staff Sergeant	24 March 1945	—
Vasily Dyatlov; Russian: Василий Семёнович Дятлов	790th Artillery Regiment	Sergeant	29 June 1945	—
Iganty Dyatlov; Russian: Игнатий Семёнович Дятлов	1239th Infantry Regiment	Lieutenant	10 April 1945	—

== Partisans ==
Name	Date of award	Role
Aleksey Danukalov; Russian: Алексей Фёдорович Данукалов	15 August 1944 †	Partisan brigade commander in Vitebsk and Smolensk
Boris Dmitriev; Russian: Борис Михайлович Дмитриев	15 August 1944 †	Partisan in Mogilev, Belarus
Vikenty Drozdovich; Russian: Викентий Иосифович Дроздович; Belarusian: Вікенцій Іосіфавіч Драздовіч	8 May 1965 †	Partisan of the Minsk resistance
Vladimir Druzhynin; Russian: Владимир Николаевич Дружинин	4 January 1944	Commissar of a partisan unit in Ukraine
Fyodor Dubrovsky; Russian: Фёдор Фомич Дубровский	16 September 1943	Partisan Brigade Commander and Major-General of the Red Army
Darya Dyachenko; Russian: Дарья Григорьевна Дьяченко	1 July 1958 †	Leader of the Komsomol-based “partisan spark” unit in Ukraine
Mikhail Duka; Russian: Михаил Ильич Дука	1 September 1942	Partisan brigade commander and Major-General of the Red Army

== Cosmonauts ==
Name	Date of award	Mission	Notes
Lev Dyomin; Russian: Лев Степанович Дёмин	2 September 1974	Soyuz 15	—
Vladimir Dzhanibekov; Russian: Владимир Александрович Джанибеков	16 March 1978; 30 March 1981	Soyuz 27 and Soyuz 39	Twice Hero of the Soviet Union
Georgy Dobrovolsky; Russian: Георгий Тимофеевич Добровольский	30 June 1971 †	Soyuz 11	Died in space on 30 June 1971

== Test and Arctic pilots ==
Name	Date of award	Aircraft tested or record flight
Ivan Davydov; Russian: Иван Егорович Давыдов	26 April 1971	An-10, An-2M, An-8, An-12, An-22, An-24, and An-30
Sergey Danilin; Russian: Сергей Алексеевич Данилин	1 September 1937	Nonstop flight from Moscow to San Jacinto
Mikhail Deksbakh; Russian: Михаил Сергеевич Дексбах	23 June 1981	Yak-18, Yak-28, Yak-38, Yak-40, Yak-42
Andrey Durnovtsev; Russian: Андрей Егорович Дурновцев	7 March 1962	Pilot of the Tu-95V that dropped the Tsar Bomba
Yuri Dobrovolsky; Russian: Юрий Антонович Добровольский	22 June 1956	Yak-7, Yak-9, Il-10, Tu-4, and Tu-95
Ivan Doronin; Russian: Иван Васильевич Доронин	20 April 1934	Rescue mission to the SS Chelyuskin that required landing on an improvised ice airstrip

== Leaders ==
Name	Date of award	Role
Nikita Dyomin; Russian: Никита Степанович Дёмин	7 May 1965	Military District Commander
Grigory Dolynikov; Russian: Григорий Устинович Дольников	21 February 1978	Aviation military adviser in Ethiopia
