= Mikhalyov =

Mikhalyov (Russian: Михалёв) is a Russian masculine surname, its feminine counterpart is Mikhalyova (Russian: Михалёва). It may refer to:

- Aleksey Mikhalyov (born 1983), Russian football player
- Aleksey Mikhalyov (1944–1994), Russian translator
- Andrei Mikhalev (born 1978), Belarusian ice hockey player
- Ilya Mikhalyov (born 1990), Ukrainian football player
- Sergey Mikhalyov (1947–2015), Russian ice hockey coach
- Vasily Mikhalyov, Soviet fighter pilot
- Vladimir Mikhalyov (born 1987), Russian football player

== See also ==
- Mikhaylov (disambiguation)
