= 508th Fighter Aviation Regiment =

- Active: 14 September 1941 - 27 October 1944
- Country: Soviet Union
- Branch: Air Force
- Type: Fighter Aircraft
- Engagements: Battle of Stalingrad; Operation Little Saturn; Ostrogozhsk–Rossosh Offensive; Voronezh–Kastornoye Offensive; Operation Star; Battle of Kursk; Kirovograd Offensive; Battle of Korsun–Cherkassy; Uman–Botoșani Offensive; Lvov–Sandomierz Offensive

The 508th Fighter Aviation Regiment was a military unit of the Soviet Air Force which took part in World War II. The unit was succeeded by the 213th Guards Fighter Aviation Regiment.

== History ==
=== Creation ===
The 508th Fighter Aviation Regiment was formed on 14 September 1941 under the command of the 6th Reserve Aviation Regiment. It was stationed in the town of Rassakazovo, Tambov Oblast, in the Orel Military District.

=== Combat Record ===
From 1 May 1942 to 9 July 1942, the 508th was stationed in the rear, tasked with defending industrial and logistics facilities behind the front lines.

Through the second half of 1942, the regiment took part in the Battle of Stalingrad. They then were a part of several rapid offensives, including Operation Little Saturn, the Ostrogozhsk-Rossosh Offensive, the Voronezh-Kastornoye Offensive, and Operation Star.

In May and June 1943, throughout the Battle of Kursk, the 508th was stationed at a Soviet military airfield in Gryaznoye. There were roughly 20-25 aircraft at the airfield, and roughly as many shelters were built nearby. Another fake airfield was constructed a few kilometers away was also constructed to mislead the Germans. There, sappers and Red Army soldiers installed aircraft mock-ups and simulated activity at the airfield, including aircraft, vehicles, observation towers, and fake anti-aircraft guns manned by stuffed mannequins.

After the Battle of Kursk, the regiment participated in several other offensives, including Kirovograd, Kursun-Cherkassy, Uman–Botoșani, and lastly Lvov-Sandomierz.

From May 1943 the regiment was assigned to the 5th, the 7th Fighter Aviation Corps, and later the 6th Guards Fighter Aviation Corps, i turn assigned at various times to the 2nd Air Army, 3rd Air Army, and 8th Air Army.

=== Reformation ===
On 27 October 1944, the 508th Fighter Aviation Regiment was reformed as the 213th Guards Fighter Aviation Regiment in recognition of their exemplary performance in combat missions, and for their courage and heroism.

== Notable members ==
=== Commanders ===
- Major Fyodor Ivanovich Oleinikov (14 September 1941 - 22 August 1942)
- Lieutenant Colonel Sergey Danilovich Zaichenko (22 September 1942 - April 1944)
- Lieutenant Colonel Nikolai Kupriyanovich Delegey (April 1944 - 30 January 1945)

=== Heroes of the Soviet Union ===
- Fyodor Arkhipenko (awarded title on 27 June 1945)
- Nikolai Delegey (awarded title on 1 July 1944)
- Anatoly Svistunov (awarded title on 27 June 1945)
- Aleksey Sergov (awarded title on 28 September 1943)
- Nikolai Stroykov (awarded title on 27 June 1945)
- Vasily Mikhalyov (awarded title on 1 July 1944)
- Pavel Chepinoga (awarded title on 26 October 1944)

== Bibliography ==
- B. Rychilo, M. Morozov. Guards Aviation Divisions, Corps, Squadrons 1941-45 // World of Aviation: Aviation Historical Journal, Technical Review .. - M., 2003. - Issue. 32, No. 3 . - S. 25-28 . Archived from the original on March 5, 2016.
- B. Rychilo, M. Morozov. Guards Aviation Divisions, Corps, Squadrons 1941-45 // World of Aviation: Aviation Historical Journal, Technical Review .. - M., 2003. - Issue. 31, No. 2 . - S. 25-31 . Archived from the original on April 22, 2016.
- The team of authors. List No. 12 of the aviation regiments of the Air Force of the Red Army, which were part of the Army in the field during the Great Patriotic War of 1941–1945. / Pokrovsky. — Ministry of Defense of the USSR. Military Scientific Directorate of the General Staff. - Moscow: Military Publishing House, 1960. - T. Appendix to the Directive of the General Staff of January 18, 1960 No. 170023. - 96 p.
- Anokhin V.A. Bykov M.Yu. All fighter regiments of Stalin. The first complete encyclopedia. — Popular science edition. - Moscow: Yauza-press, 2014. - S. 304–308. — 944 p. — ISBN 978-5-9955-0707-9 .
