= Vassili Davidenko =

Vassili' or Vasily Davidenko may refer to:

- Vassili Davidenko (cyclist)
- Vasily Davidenko (general)
