= Fyodor Arkhipenko =

Soviet Belarusian flying ace

- Native name: Фёдар Архіпенка
- Born: 30 October 1921; Avsimovichi, Byelorussian SSR, Soviet Union (now Belarus)
- Died: 28 December 2012 (aged 91) Moscow, Russian Federation
- Allegiance: Soviet Union
- Branch: Soviet Air Force
- Service years: 1938–1959
- Rank: Colonel
- Conflicts: World War II
- Awards: Hero of the Soviet Union

Fyodor Fyodorovich Arkhipenko (Belarusian: Фёдар Фёдаравіч Архіпенка, romanized: Fiodar Fiodaravič Archipienka; Russian: Фёдор Фёдорович Архипенко; 30 October 1921 – 28 December 2012) was a flying ace of the Soviet Air Force during the Second World War and recipient of the title Hero of the Soviet Union.

== Early life ==
Arkhipenko was born on 30 October 1921 to a Belarusian peasant family in Avsimovichi village, located in within the present-day Bobruisk district of Belarus, although his family moved to the village of Pobolovo shortly after he was born. In 1933 they moved to the city of Bobruisk, where he completed his ninth grade of school in 1938 and graduated from the local aeroclub before entering the military in November that year. After graduating from the Odessa Military Aviation School of Pilots in 1940 he was posted to the 17th Fighter Aviation Regiment as an I-153 pilot.

== World War II ==
Immediately after the start of the German invasion of the Soviet Union, Arkhipenko entered combat on the front lines of the Second World War with the rest of his regiment. On 15 October 1941 he made a dangerous landing on German-controlled territory to save a fellow pilot who had been shot down; however, during the landing, he broke the landing gear, forcing the two of them to make their way through the front lines to return to their regiment. For four days they hiked through enemy territory, and it wasn't until the end of the month that they made it back to their regiment. Despite being a flight commander he did not gain his first aerial victory until mid 1942 when he shared in the downing of a Dornier Do 215 on 28 June 1942 while flying a LaGG-3; it was not until after shooting down a Bf 109 on 8 August that year that he gained his first solo shootdown. Later in November he gained another shared kill of a Do 215, but the next month he was transferred to the 508th Fighter Aviation Regiment. Initially posted as a deputy squadron commander, he added several additional shootdowns to his tally and eventually gained a promotion to squadron commander before being reassigned to the 508th Fighter Aviation Regiment in October 1943. Earlier that year he had been wounded twice, first during an aerial battle in January and later in June during a bombing. Not long transferring to the 129th Guards Fighter Aviation Regiment in October 1943 as a squadron commander, he went on to rapidly increase his tally of shootdowns throughout 1944, having switched to flying the P-39 Airacobra. His last shootdown in the war and only shootdown in 1945 was a Fw 190 and took place on 17 January 1945 on the outskirts of Częstochowa. During the war he participated the battles of Kovel, Lutsk, Kiev, Kursk, Belgorod, Stalingrad, Kharkhov, the Dnieper, Kirovgrad, Yassko-Kishinev, Lvov-Sandomierz, and Silesia. By the end of the war he reached the rank of major and had been promoted to the position of deputy commander of the air rifle service within his unit; his tally stood at 28 solo and 15 shared shootdowns gained over the course of 467 sorties flown on I-153, LaGG-3, Yak-1, Yak-7B, and P-39 aircraft, engaging in 102 dogfights throughout the process. For his actions in the war he was awarded the title Hero of the Soviet Union on 27 June 1945. (Note: Some sources indicate 29 solo shootdowns. Although his flight log indicated 30 solo and 14 shared victories, most historians attribute it to overclaiming. While he piloted the I-153 and Yak-1 in the war, he did not gain any shootdowns on them.)

== Postwar ==
After the end of the war he remained in the military, graduating from the Lipetsk Higher Officer Aviation School in June before returning to his wartime regiment as assistant commander of the air rifle service, where he remained until February 1946. After graduating from the Air Force Academy of Monino in May 1951 he was made commander of a training regiment in the Stalingrad Military Aviation School based in Novosibirsk. Starting in December 1952 he was based in Estonia, where he served as a flight inspector of the 58th Fighter Aviation Corps until December 1955, after which he became a senior flight inspector in a training department, and from August 1958 until he retired from the military in mid 1959 he served as a senior flight navigator at the Yeisk Military Aviation School of Pilots. During his career he piloted the Yak-9, MiG-15, and MiG-17. From then to 1961 he worked at Vnukovo Airport, and from 1961 to 1962 he worked at the helicopter maintenance department for the Rassvet OKB design bureau. From 1962 to 1964 he was an inspector at a Moscow carburetor factory for the trade union city committee, and from 1963 to 1965 he was a senior engineer at the Mossanelectroprom trust. He briefly served as a senior engineer-economist in the planning department of the Ministry of Civil Aviation starting in February 1965, but left in September that year. In the first half of 1966 he worked as a senior engineer at the Ministry of Local Industry of the RSFSR, from 1966 to 1967 he was senior engineer of the technical department of the Central Union of Consumer Societies, and from 1967 to 1969 he was head of a department in the Ministry of Rural Construction of the RSFSR, having graduated from the Moscow Engineering and Economic Institute in 1968. For several months in 1969 he held the post of deputy head of a department in the Ministry of Agriculture, and later that year he worked as senior engineer of a trust in the Ministry of Communications. From 1970 to 1974 he worked at the technical documentation department of the Mosblorgtekhstroy trust. From 1974 to 1975 he worked as deputy head of the department for accounting and distribution of housing of the Bauman district council of Moscow, and after that he became a chief project engineer at the Mosblorgtekhstroy trust, where he rose to the position of deputy managing director before becoming a senior safety engineer at the Mossanelectroprom trust in 1982. He later worked as the deputy director of the Mosoblstroypogress State Unitary Enterprise, where he remained until retiring in 2004. He lived in Moscow for the remainder of his life, where he died on 28 December 2012 and was buried in the Troyekurovskoye cemetery.

== Awards ==
- Hero of the Soviet Union (27 June 1945)
- Order of Lenin (27 June 1945)
- Three Order of the Red Banner (20 January 1943, 17 July 1944, and 25 April 1945)
- Order of the Patriotic War 1st (11 March 1985) and 2nd class (26 February 1943)
- Order of the Red Star (26 October 1955)
- Medal "for Military Merit" (20 June 1949)
- campaign and jubilee medals
