= Andrey Alyoshin =

- Native name: Андрей Васильевич Алёшин
- Born: 21 May [O.S. 3 June] 1905; Novoselki, Kozelsky Uyezd, Kaluga Governorate, Russian Empire
- Died: 11 April 1974 (aged 68) Popelevo, Kozelsky District, Kaluga Oblast, RSFSR, USSR
- Allegiance: Soviet Union
- Branch: Red Army
- Service years: 1939–1945
- Conflicts: Winter War; World War II
- Awards: Hero of the Soviet Union; Order of Glory

Andrey Vasilyevich Alyoshin (Russian: Андрей Васильевич Алёшин; 21 May [O.S. 3 June] 1905 – 11 April 1974) was a machine gunner in the Red Army during World War II and one of only four people that was both a Hero of the Soviet Union and full bearer of the Order of Glory.

== Early life ==
Alyoshin was born on 1905 to a Russian peasant family in Novoselki village, located within the present-day Kozelsky district of the Kaluga oblast. At the age of seven his father died, leaving his family destitute. Nevertheless, he went on to complete basic schooling in two years, but was also self-taught. From 1925 to 1930 he worked as chairman of the Vyazovoy village council. Later he worked as an accountant at a state farm. In 1939 he entered the Red Army and served as a gunner in the Polish campaign and Winter War, but was soon demobilized in 1940.

== World War II ==
Soon after the start of the German invasion of the Soviet Union, he was soon re-drafted into the Red Army on 4 July 1941 and initially deployed to the front as part of the 50th Cavalry Regiment. There, he participated in the defense of Moscow. Later he became the commander of the gun crew in the 175th Guards Artillery and Mortar Regiment of the 4th Guards Cavalry Division. During the battles for Seredina-Buda in March 1943, his crew took out three enemy tanks from a group of ten during the battle, for which he received his first military medal, the medal "for battle merit". However, it was not until 11 August 1944 that he was awarded an Order of Glory, which he received for his actions on the night of 26 July 1944 when he pushed his gun ahead of the battle formation and opened fire on enemy machine gunners to repulse their attack. The next day he participated in the destruction of an ammunition depot. Subsequently, he was awarded another Order of Glory 3rd class for his actions repelling repeated enemy counterattacks during 28–30 January 1945. On the first day he killed at least ten enemy soldiers with his machine gun, and by 30 January he and his crew took out an additional 20 enemy soldiers plus two machine gun nests. Just a few days later on 5 February while advancing with his crew in an area southwest of Szczecin, Poland, he became the first to open fire on the enemy despite being under intense fire, resulting in the deaths of 52 enemy soldiers in the engagement. For his actions in that battle he was nominated for the title Hero of the Soviet Union, which was awarded on 31 May 1945. Before being awarded the title, in early May he again distinguished himself in the battle for Neu, southwest of Fürstenwalde, during which he and his crew repulsed three counterattacks, taking out an enemy platoon. For his actions in that battle he was awarded another Order of Glory in June. (Note: Duplicate Order of Glory 3nd class changed to 1st class in 1955)

== Postwar ==
Demobilized from the Red Army in 1945 after the end of the war, he returned to his homeland of Kozelsky district, settling in the village of Popelevo, where he worked as chief accountant of the Krasny Plodovod sovkhoz. He died on 11 April 1974 and was buried in the Novoselki cemetery.

== Awards ==
- Hero of the Soviet Union (31 May 1945)
- Order of Lenin (31 May 1945)
- Order of the Patriotic War 1st class
- Order of Glory (1st class - 19 August 1955, 2nd class - 18 June 1945; 3rd class - 11 August 1944 and 11 March 1945)
- Medal "For Battle Merit" (30 March 1943)
- campaign and jubilee medals

== See also ==
- Ivan Drachenko
- Pavel Dubinda
- Nikolai Kuznetsov
