= Nikolai Kuznetsov (artilleryist) =

- Native name: Николай Иванович Кузнецов
- Born: 29 April 1922; Pyruchey village, Olonets Governorate, RSFSR
- Died: 11 September 2008 (aged 86); Pestovo, Novgorod Oblast, Russian Federation
- Allegiance: Soviet Union
- Service / branch: Red Army
- Rank: Starshina
- Awards: Hero of the Soviet Union; Order of Glory

Nikolai Ivanovich Kuznetsov (Russian: Николай Иванович Кузнецов, 29 April 1922 — 11 September 2008) was a soldier in the Red Army during World War II and one of only four people that was both a Hero of the Soviet Union and full bearer of the Order of Glory.

== Early life ==
Born on 29 April 1922 to a Russian peasant family in Pytruchey village, after completing his seventh grade of school and then trade school he worked on the construction of the Kandalaksha hydroelectric power plant in Murmansk.

== World War II ==
Having been drafted into the Red Army in August 1941, he went on to undergo training for intelligence collection. Initially he commanded a squad that operated behind enemy lines, derailing trains, tracking enemy troop movements, and sending ciphers. However, his career in intelligence was cut short after a stomach wound left him confined in the hospital for a prolonged time, so after recovering in 1942 he became an artilleryman. After fighting in the battles for the "blue line" on the Taman peninsula he took part in the battles for Crimea. There, as gunner in the 369th anti-tank artillery battalion, he earned his first Order of Glory, for his actions in the fighting for Mekenzia, a village 10 kilometers east of Sevastopol; during the battle on 23 April 1944 he took out two enemy machine guns, allowing the advance of infantry to continue, and after seeing an enemy tank he took it out with the very first shot. He went on to earn his next Order of Glory for his actions in early October that year during the battle for Shamaitkein station, in which he led his subordinates in taking out enemy firing points and killing 23 German soldiers, as well as setting fire to an enemy vehicle with a direct hit. Subsequently, he was awarded a duplicate Order of glory 2nd class (which was replaced with the Order of Glory 1st class in 1980) for his actions in the battle for Labiau on 1 February 1945, having set fire to an enemy tank with direct fire, destroyed two enemy machine gun nests, and killed over a squad worth of enemy infantry. He then participated in the campaign for East Prussia, including the city of Königsberg. During the battle for the city his crew took out a platoon of enemy infantry, and his decisions enabled the destruction of several firing points. Despite being seriously wounded and alone at the gun after attacks killed off his comrades, he remained at his gun and continued to fire, taking out two more tanks, for which was awarded the title Hero of the Soviet Union. However, Kuznetsov did not finish combat until 13 May 1945, having to fight off enemy soldiers in Danzig who refused to surrender at the time. In total during the war he took out eleven enemy tanks, and on 24 June 1945 he marched in the historic victory day parade in Moscow.

== Postwar ==
Having been demobilized in 1945, he went on to attend the Leningrad Electromechanical College, graduating in 1950. Starting in 1949 he worked as head of a sawmill until becoming a safety engineer at the Pestovsky Timber Processing Plant in 1973. He also served as a deputy of the Supreme Soviet of the 2nd and 3rd convocations. On 10 September 2007 robbers brazenly stole his medals. While the medals were soon returned to him later that year in December, the attack took a toll on his already poor health, and on 11 September 2008 he died. He was buried in the Central Military Burial Ground of Pestovo.

== Awards ==
- Hero of the Soviet Union (19 April 1945)
- Order of Lenin (19 April 1945)
- Order of the Red Banner (23 June 1944)
- Order of the Patriotic War 1st class (11 March 1985)
- Order of Glory (3rd class - 17 May 1944; 2nd class - 1 December 1944 and 10 February 1945; duplicate 2nd class one replaced with 1st class order on 12 March 1980)
- Order of Friendship of Peoples (postwar)
- Two Medal "For Courage" (8 December 1943 and 21 April 1944)
- Campaign and jubilee medals

== See also ==
- Ivan Drachenko
- Pavel Dubinda
- Andrey Alyoshin
