= Pavel Dubinda =

Pavel Khristoforovich Dubinda
- Павел Христофорович Дубинда
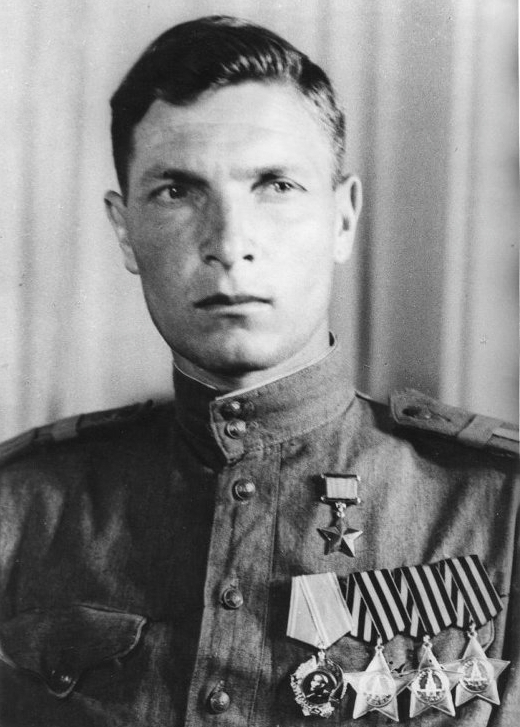
- Born: 25 July [O.S. 12 July] 1914; Progno, Khersonsky Uyezd, Kherson Governorate, Russian Empire
- Died: 22 October 1992 (aged 78); Kherson, Ukraine
- Military career
- Allegiance: Soviet Union
- Branch: Soviet Navy; Red Army
- Service years: 1936–1945
- Rank: Sergeant
- Conflicts: World War II
- Awards: Hero of the Soviet Union; Order of Glory 1st class

Pavel Khristoforovich Dubinda (Russian: Павел Христофорович Дуби́нда; 25 July [O.S. 12 July] 1914 – 22 October 1992) was a sergeant in the Red Army during World War II and one of only four people that was both a full bearer of the Order of Glory and Hero of the Soviet Union.

== Early life ==
Dubinda was born on 25 July [O.S. 12 July] 1914 to a Ukrainian family in the village of Progno. After completing his seventh grade of school he worked on a fish farm before entering the navy in 1936.

== World War II ==
During the very initial phase of the German invasion of the Soviet Union he was stationed on the Chervona Ukraina, on which he participated in the defense of Odessa and Sevastopol. After the cruiser was bombed and the crew ordered to abandon ship in November 1941 he was assigned to the 8th Marine Rifle Brigade. Captured in battle, he was held in several POW camps before managing to successfully escape and return to the Red Army in 1944. Upon his return he entered the 293rd Guards Rifle Regiment. Soon he was awarded the Order of Glory 3rd class on 5 September 1944 for being the first in his squad to enter an enemy trench on 8 August 1944, killing seven enemy soldiers in the process. Later that month his actions in the battle for a railway station in Poland resulted in him being awarded Order of Glory 2nd class on 5 October 1944. In the ensuing combat, he replaced his wounded company commander to continue pursuing the attack, and personally killed ten enemy soldiers. After being the first to enter an enemy trench again during the battles for Peshiken in East Prussia from 22–25 October, he personally killed four enemy soldiers and captured an officer. Doing so made him eligible for the Order of Glory 1st class, which was awarded on 24 March 1945. Less than two weeks before becoming a full bearer of the Order of Glory he saw heavy combat in the battle for Königsberg. On 15 March his platoon took Bladiau village, but soon the Axis launched a heavy counterattack, launching artillery at Dubinda's position. His platoon fought until their ammunition ran out, after which Dubinda took an enemy machine gun and began firing point-blank on enemy forces. Chasing the retreating enemy, his platoon managed to capture 40 soldiers and 4 officers in a courtyard they took over. For his actions in Königsberg he was awarded the title Hero of the Soviet Union on 29 June 1945, making him the first person who was both a full bearer of the Order of Glory and a Hero of the Soviet Union.

== Postwar ==
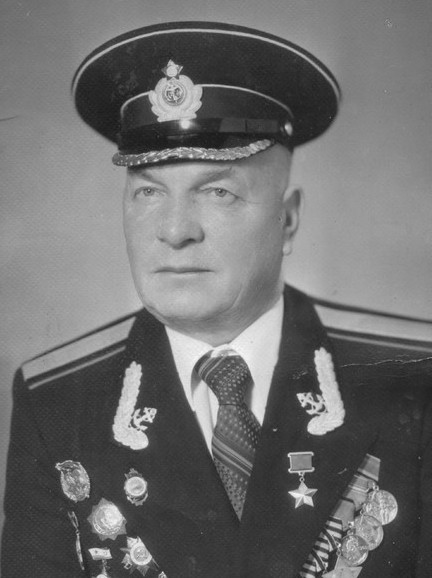
Captain Dubinda in his postwar Fishing Fleet uniform.

Demobilized in August 1945, Dubinda worked in the antarctic whaling fleet. For the remainder of his life he lived in Kherson until his death on 22 October 1992.

== Awards ==
- Hero of the Soviet Union (29 June 1945)
- Order of Lenin (29 June 1945)
- Order of Glory 1st class (24 March 1945)
- Order of Glory 2nd class (5 October 1944)
- Order of Glory 3rd class (5 September 1944)
- Order of Bogdan Khmelnitsky 3rd class (6 April 1945)
- Order of the Patriotic War 1st class (11 March 1985)
- campaign and jubilee medals

== See also ==
- Ivan Drachenko
- Andrey Alyoshin
- Nikolai Kuznetsov
