= Stepan Davidenko =

Soviet army officer

- Native name: Степан Павлович Давиденко
- Born: 30 November [O.S. 17 November] 1911; Aleksandrovo-Grigorievka, Russian Empire (modern Donetsk)
- Died: October 10, 1972 Cherkassy, Soviet Union
- Allegiance: Soviet Union
- Service years: 1930–1957
- Rank: lieutenant colonel
- Conflicts: Great Patriotic War
- Awards: Hero of the Soviet Union

Stepan Pavlovich Davidenko (Ukrainian: Степан Павлович Давиденко; 30 November [O.S. 17 November] 1911 – 10 October 1972) was a lieutenant colonel of the Soviet Army, participant in the Great Patriotic War, Hero of the Soviet Union (1944).

== Biography ==
Born on November 30, 1911, in the village of Aleksandrovo-Grigorievka (now within the boundaries of Donetsk) in a working-class family. He graduated from seven classes of school, in 1930 - a two-year Soviet party school. He worked at Mine No. 1 of the Shcheglovsky Mining Administration.

In 1930 he was called up for service in the Workers 'and Peasants' Red Army. In 1932 he graduated from the Orenburg courses of shooters-bombers, in 1933 - the Krasnodar military united school of pilots and letnabs. He took part in the battles near Lake Khasan. From the first day of the Great Patriotic War - on its fronts. Participated in battles on the Bryansk, Voronezh and Central fronts.

By October 1943, the captain was a squadron navigator of the 24th air regiment of the 241st bomber air division of the 3rd bomber air corps of the 16th air army of the Central Front. By this time, he had made 180 sorties, carried out reconnaissance of the enemy's deep rear, bombarded concentrations of his troops and communications.

By the Decree of the Presidium of the Supreme Soviet of the USSR "On conferring the title of Hero of the Soviet Union to the officers of the air force of the Red Army" dated February 4, 1944, for "exemplary performance of combat missions of the command on the front of the fight against the German invaders and the courage and heroism shown at the same time," he was awarded a high title of Hero of the Soviet Union with the award of the Order of Lenin and the medal "Gold Star" number 3217.

After the end of the war, he continued to serve in the Soviet Army. In 1952 he graduated from the Higher Navigator School for Officers. In 1957 he was transferred to the reserve with the rank of lieutenant colonel.

Lived in Cherkassy, died on October 10, 1972. Buried in Cherkassy.

He was awarded three Orders of Lenin, three Orders of the Red Banner, Orders of the Patriotic War of the 1st degree and the Red Star, as well as a number of medals.

In honor of Davidenko, a street in the city of Makeevka, Donetsk region of Ukraine, is named.

== Awards ==
- medal "Gold Star" (02/04/1944)
- Order of Lenin (02/04/1944)
- Order of Lenin (05/24/1942)
- Order of the Red Banner (11/17/1941)
- Order of the Red Banner (03.11.1944)
- Order of the Red Banner (05/17/1957)
- Order of the Red Star (05/06/1946)
- Order of the Patriotic War, 1st class (04/22/1943)
- Military Merit Medal (03.11.1944)
- Medal for the Victory over Germany in the Great Patriotic War 1941-1945 (05/09/1945)
- Medal for the Capture of Berlin (06/09/1945)
- Sign "Participant of the Khasan battles"

== Literature ==
- Heroes of the Soviet Union: A Brief Biographical Dictionary / Prev. ed. Collegium I. N. Shkadov. - M .: Military Publishing House, 1987. - T. 1 / Abaev - Lyubichev /. — 911 p. — 100,000 copies. — ISBN ots., Reg. No. in RCP 87–95382.
- Knights of the Golden Star. - Donetsk: Donbas, 1976.
