= Gryaznoye =

Gryaznoye Грязное
- Selo
- Location within Belgorod Oblast Location within Russia
- Coordinates: 50°59′N 36°31′E
- Country: Russia
- Region: Belgorod Oblast
- District: Prokhorovsky District
- Time zone: UTC+3:00

Gryaznoye (Russian: Грязное) is a rural locality (a selo) in Prokhorovsky District, Belgorod Oblast, Russia. The population was 179 as of 2010. There are 2 streets.

== Geography ==
Gryaznoye is located 25 km southwest of Prokhorovka (the district's administrative centre) by road. Malye Mayachki is the nearest rural locality.
