= Ivan Drachenko =

Ivan Grigorievich Drachenko
- Иван Григорьевич Драченко
- Born: 15 November 1922; Velikaya Sevastyanovka village, Kiev Governorate, Ukrainian SSR
- Died: 16 November 1994 (aged 72); Kiev, Ukraine
- Military career
- Allegiance: Soviet Union
- Branch: Soviet Air Force
- Service years: 1941–1947
- Rank: Captain
- Unit: 140th Assault Aviation Regiment
- Conflicts: World War II
- Awards: Hero of the Soviet Union; Order of Glory 1st class

Ivan Grigorievich Drachenko (Russian: Иван Григорьевич Драченко; 15 November 1922 – 16 November 1994) was a Soviet Il-2 pilot and the only aviator awarded both the title Hero of the Soviet Union and been a full bearer of the Order of Glory.

== Early life ==
Drachenko was born on 15 November 1922 to a Ukrainian peasant family in Velikaya Sevastyanovka village. Before entering the military in 1941 he complete high school and trained at the Leningrad aeroclub. During the early phase of World War II he was a student at the Tambov Military Aviation School of Pilots, away from the front.

== Combat career ==
After graduating from the academy in Tambov, Drachenko was deployed to the warfront as an Il-2 pilot. He fought in the battle of Kursk. While over Kharkhov on 14 August 1943 he rammed an enemy fighter to save his regimental commander, but was seriously injured in the process. After parachuting out he became unconscious and was captured by the Axis. While detained in a prison camp near Poltava, a Soviet doctor operated on him, but was unable to restore sight in his right eye. In September he managed to escape from the camp and get over to Soviet lines. Kept in a Moscow hospital until March 1944 and fitted with a glass eye, when he returned to flying he did not disclose his visual impairment on military documents, and only his close friends ever found out in the war. In addition to flying standard ground-attack missions, he also performed reconnaissance flights; after a mission on 6 April 1944 he was awarded the Order of Glory 3rd class on 5 July 1944 for gathering valuable intelligence. While over enemy territory he was attacked by 5 Fw 190 fighters, but he managed to escape and make a safe landing with his damaged plane. Not long later during a flight over Iași he again repelled attacks from German fighters before going on to his target, a railway station. For doing so he was awarded on 5 September 1944 his first Order of Glory 2nd class. By August 1944 he totaled 100 sorties on the Il-2, for which he was nominated for the title Hero of the Soviet Union, which was awarded on 26 October 1944. For success in aerial combat engagements and ground attack missions was awarded another Order of Glory 2nd class in November 1944, having been nominated in October, but it was not until over a decade after the war that the issue with the duplicate awards was fixed and he was made a true full bearer of the order.

== Postwar ==
After the war Drachenko entered the air force academy, but was forced to leave for the reserve in 1947 for medical reasons. He then attended law school at the University of Kiev, which he graduated from in 1953. He later became the principal of the school and served as the deputy director for the Palace of Culture in Kiev before his death on 16 November 1994.

== Awards ==
- Hero of the Soviet Union (26 October 1944)
- Order of Lenin (26 October 1944)
- Three Order of Glory (1st class - 26 November 1958, 2nd class - 5 September 1944 and 7 October 1944 [Second Order of Glory 2nd class changed to 1st class in 1968]; 3rd class - 5 June 1944)
- Order of the Red Banner (19 May 1945)
- Two Order of the Patriotic War 1st class (22 February 1944 and 11 March 1985)
- Order of the Red Star (25 January 1944)
- campaign and jubilee medals

== See also ==
- Pavel Dubinda
- Andrey Alyoshin
- Nikolai Kuznetsov
