= Grigory Mitrofanovich Davidenko =

Soviet soldier

- Born: February 11, 1916 O.S. (February 24, 1916 N.S.); Petrovka, Pavlovsky district, Voronezh province, Russian Empire
- Died: April 25, 1993 (aged 77); Saint Petersburg, Russia
- Military career
- Allegiance: Soviet Union
- Rank: Midshipman
- Unit: Baltic Fleet
- Conflicts: Great Patriotic War
- Awards: Hero of the Soviet Union

Grigory Mitrofanovich Davidenko (24 February 1916 – 25 April 1993) was a Soviet sailor in the Baltic Fleet during the Great Patriotic War. He was awarded the title Hero of the Soviet Union in 1944.

== Biography ==
Grigory Mitrofanovich Davidenko was born on February 11 (24), 1916 in the village of Petrovka, Pavlovsky district of the Voronezh province of the Russian Empire (now the village of Pavlovsky district of the Voronezh region of the Russian Federation) into a Ukrainian peasant family. After graduating from elementary school, he worked on a private farm, then on a collective farm.

In 1937, he was drafted into the ranks of the Workers 'and Peasants' Red Fleet. He was trained in the Diving Training Squad named after S. M. Kirov. The foreman of the 2nd article he began his service as a helmsman on a patrol boat in Kronstadt as part of the Border Troops of the NKVD of the USSR. Since 1940, he served in the naval border detachment on the Hanko Peninsula.

In battles with the Nazi invaders, he from June 22, 1941, as commander of the ZK patrol boat. Participated in the battles for the islands of Ezel and Dago and the port of Paldiski. During the evacuation of Soviet troops from Estonia, he took out more than 300 Soviet soldiers and officers on his boat. During the defense of Hanko, the crew of the boat under the command of he performed the most important tasks of the command. In the period from July to December 1941, Grigory Mitrofanovich took part in 11 landing operations and landed reconnaissance groups on the Finnish islands 7 times. At the same time, he and his crew took a direct part in the clashes with the enemy. So, in July 1941, together with the soldiers from the Hanko garrison, the sailors of Davidenko defeated the Finnish landing on the island of Sturkolm. At the same time, Davidenko captured a serviceable enemy boat, which was towed to Hanko. In September 1941, he and his crew defeated the Finnish garrisons on the islands of Morgland and Horsten. When it was not possible to go to sea, Grigory Mitrofanovich fought as a sniper in the marines. During the fighting on the island of Heste, he destroyed 17 enemy soldiers. After receiving an order to evacuate from Krasny Gangut, foreman of the 1st article he on his boat took out Soviet garrisons with a total of 372 people from the nearby islands. At the same time, the boat received numerous damage from the fire of the Finnish coastal artillery and had to be blown up. Grigoriy Mitrofanovich was one of the last to leave Khanko, having ensured the evacuation of a group of demolition workers who had been mining and destroying the military facilities of the base. The crew boat OVR-9, on which he was sailing, was blown up in minefields due to malfunctions and lack of fuel near the island of Gogland. The crew picked up a nearby Soviet boat. At the same time, Grigory Mitrofanovich twice jumped into the icy water and pulled out two wounded soldiers.

Upon returning to Kronstadt, he continued his service as the commander of the helmsman-signalers squad on the minesweeper "TShch-39". In the summer campaign of 1942, he participated in 22 combat operations for minesweeping, escorting and escorting ships of the Baltic Fleet. On the night of August 2–3, 1942, while towing a barge with snowmobiles in heavy fog near Kronstadt, the minesweeper was blown up by a sea mine. Until the last minute, Grigory Mitrofanovich dropped life-saving equipment from the ship to the sailors in the water. Noticing that a sinking minesweeper could drag a barge with valuable cargo along with it, Davidenko, at the risk of his life, managed to cut the tow rope, after which he jumped into the water and saved the drowning signalman.

In December 1942, foreman of the 1st article he was appointed commander of the KT-97 boat minesweeper of the 7th division of boat minesweepers of the 1st minesweeping brigade of the Baltic Fleet. In the summer campaign of 1943, the boat Davidenko participated in the 81st combat operation. Over the summer, he traveled 6200 miles, dropped 298 depth charges, destroyed 7 enemy magnetic-acoustic mines. In total, by the summer of 1944, the crew of Davidenko took part in the 121st combat operation for mine surveillance, minesweeping, bombing and escorting sea transports, and the destruction of magnetic-acoustic and anchor mines. The crew of "KT-97" also participated in 18 landing operations. The foreman of the 1st article, he, developed an original method for the destruction of booby traps, which was subsequently successfully used by all units of the trawling brigade. On May 26, 1944, a group of boats of the division in a narrow fairway was attacked by 37 enemy bombers. The enemy dropped 74 air bombs on the boats and fired intensely from cannons and machine guns. In the most difficult conditions of the battle, due to skillful maneuvering, he managed to get his boat out of the blow without a single damage. By a decree of the Presidium of the Supreme Soviet of the USSR of July 22, 1944, foreman 1 article Davidenko Grigory Mitrofanovich was awarded the title of Hero of the Soviet Union. Soon he was awarded the next military rank of chief foreman.

In the summer campaign of 1944, the crew of a boat minesweeper under the command of he participated in 107 combat operations, including trawling in the Luga Bay and Narva Bay, deep bombing in the Tallinn Bay, and the destruction of booby traps. In August 1944, according to the plan proposed and implemented by he, an enemy flotilla of four German destroyers was disoriented, three of which were blown up in their own minefields and sank, and the fourth was severely damaged. As a result of the operation, 107 sailors of the Kriegsmarine were captured, including the German corvette captain who commanded the flotilla. In total, in the summer of 1944, Chief Petty Officer Davidenko's KT-97 traveled 9960 miles, destroyed 22 anchor mines, 27 mine defenders and 3 floating mines. In the autumn of 1944, the boat minesweepers of the Baltic Fleet received a new numbering. The vessel, on which he served, received the designation "KT-363". With the start of the 1945 campaign, the 1st Trawling Brigade focused on clearing mines in the Baltic Sea. After the removal of minefields in the Narva Bay, the 1st minesweeping brigade became part of the Tallinn defensive region and until the end of the war was engaged in demining the Tallinn Bay. Grigory Mitrofanovich took part in 43 combat operations, during which the crew of his boat destroyed 12 enemy mines and 3 mine defenders. Here in the Tallinn Bay, he completed his military career.

After the war, Grigory Mitrofanovich remained in long-term service and until 1948 he participated in mine clearing operations in the Baltic. In 1948, he retired to the reserve with the rank of midshipman. Lived in Leningrad (since 1991 - St. Petersburg). He worked as a rigging foreman at motor depot No. 1. He died on 25 April 1993. He was buried in St. Petersburg at the Volkovskoye cemetery.

== Awards ==
- Hero of the Soviet Union (22 July 1944)
- Order of Lenin (22 July 1944)
- TwoOrder of the Patriotic War of the 1st class (7 May 1944 and 11 March 1985)
- medals including:
  - Medal of Ushakov (20 February 1945)
  - Medal "For Battle Merit" (6 November 1947);
  - Medal of Nakhimov (20 July 1945)
  - Medal "For the Defense of Leningrad"

== Memorials ==
- A bust of him is installed on the memorial complex in the park of the city of Pavlovsk, Voronezh region.
- A memorial plaque in honor of him is installed on the building of the Petrovskaya secondary school in the village of Petrovka, Voronezh region.
- A memorial plaque in honor of him is installed on Anchor Square in Kronstadt.
- A street in the village of Petrovka, Voronezh Region, was named after him.

== Literature ==
- Heroes of the Soviet Union: A Brief Biographical Dictionary / Prev. ed. Collegium I. N. Shkadov. - M .: Military Publishing House, 1987. - T. 1 / Abaev - Lyubichev /. — 911 p. — 100,000 copies. — ISBN ots., Reg. No. in RCP 87–95382.
- Grinko A.I., Ulaev G.F. Bogatyrs of the land of Voronezh. - Voronezh: Central Black Earth Book Publishing House, 1965. - S. 107–109.
- Mudrak F. B. On trawl tacks. - M .: Military Publishing House, 1980. - S. 144.
- Ladinsky Yu. V. In the fairways of the Baltic. - M .: Military Publishing House, 1973. - 158 p.

Heroes of the gray-haired Baltic / comp.: N. A. Badeev, Yu. V. Varganov, P. I. Kuznetsov. - L .: Lenizdat, 1965. - S. 135–143.

- Heroes of war / comp. A. Pahklimyagi. - Tallinn: Eesti raamat, 1984. - S. 107–109.
- Heroes of the Soviet Union of the Navy, 1937–1945: a biographical guide / compiled by P. G. Tarasov, Sh. Ya. Billevich, V. A. Blokhin and others; under total ed. V. N. Alekseev. - M .: Military Publishing House, 1977. - S. 147.
- Burov A.V. The Man Who Died Twice // Your Heroes, Leningrad. 2nd ed., add. - L .: Lenizdat, 1970. - 639 p.
