= Grigory Ivanovich Davidenko =

Hero of the Soviet Union

- Native name: Григорий Иванович Давиденко
- Born: 17 April 1921; Stary Kovray
- Died: 8 May 1945 (aged 24) Baltic Sea, near Liepaja, Latvia
- Allegiance: Soviet Union
- Branch: Naval Aviation
- Rank: Senior Lieutenant
- Awards: Hero of the Soviet Union

Grigory Ivanovich Davidenko (Russian: Григорий Иванович Давиденко; 17 April 1921–8 May 1945) was a Soviet reconnaissance pilot and navigator in the Baltic Fleet during the Great Patriotic War who was awarded the title Hero of the Soviet Union. He was killed in action one day before victory.

== Biography ==
He was born on 17 April 1921, in the village of Stary Kovray in a family of peasants. He graduated from high school and worked in his native village.

He served in the ranks of the USSR Navy from October 1939. In June 1941 he graduated from the Naval Aviation School named after S. Levanevsky in Nikolaev. He was sent to the Air Force of the Baltic Fleet and enlisted as an air gunner-scorer in the 73rd Bomber Aviation Regiment of the Navy. From October 1941 to May 1942 he was retrained in the 1st reserve aviation regiment of the Navy Air Force (Saransk) for the Pe-2 aircraft.

He took part in the Great Patriotic War from July 1942, having arrived in the active fleet as a navigator of the crew of the 26th separate reconnaissance aviation squadron. From March 1943 he fought in the ranks of the 15th reconnaissance aviation regiment: air gunner-scorer, from May 1943 — flight navigator, from May 1944 — squadron navigator. In 1943, he was admitted to the CPSU (b).

Most of the sorties were made for long-range reconnaissance of German and Finnish naval bases (including Helsinki and Kotka) and the search for enemy ships in the Baltic and on Lake Ladoga. However, it was necessary to carry out tasks for delivering bombing strikes on enemy positions. In January 1943, during the operation to break the blockade of Leningrad, he was entrusted with control over railway and highway communications in the German rear in order to timely detect the movement of the reserve to the front line, to complete this task he completed 4 successful sorties.

As of September 1943, the navigator of the 44th squadron of the 15th Reconnaissance Aviation Regiment of the Air Force of the Baltic Fleet, he, made 215 sorties for reconnaissance of naval bases and watercraft in the Gulf of Finland (139 sorties), Lake Ladoga (20 sorties), for aerial photography of the front line of enemy defenses (26 sorties), for reconnaissance of railway junctions, highways, and airfields (12 sorties), for bombing ships and artillery batteries (8 sorties). Spent 13 air battles. He damaged a patrol ship and a gunboat with bomb strikes, destroyed several factory buildings, and struck artillery and mortar batteries with direct hits.

By the Decree of the Presidium of the Supreme Soviet of the USSR “On conferring the title of Hero of the Soviet Union to the officers of the Navy” dated 22 January 1944, Lieutenant Davidenko Grigory Ivanovich was awarded the title of Hero of the Soviet Union with the award of the Order of Lenin and the Gold Star medal (No. 2918).

From 1944 to 1945, he participated in the Leningrad-Novgorod, Vyborg, Baltic, East Prussian offensive operations, as well as in the blockade of the Courland grouping of German troops. In total, he completed 258 sorties during the war.

He was killed in action on 8 May 1945, while performing a reconnaissance mission seeking out German ships in the Baltic Sea near the Latvian city of Liepāja. The Pe-2 plane he was navigating for, piloted by fellow Hero of the Soviet Union captain Aleksey Grachyov, in whose crew Grigory Davidenko flew on a mission as a navigator, was attacked by a large group of German Focke-Wulf Fw 190 Würger fighters that flew from Courland airfields to the city of Flensburg to be captured by the British. In this battle, Lieutenant Gerhard Thyben shot down the Pe-2 of Davidenko and Grachyov, and other German pilots shot down Hero of the Soviet Union Captain Aleksandr Kurzenkov, who was providing fighter cover for the Pe-2 in a Yak-9.

== Awards ==
- Hero of the Soviet Union (22 January 1944)
- Order of Lenin (22 January 1944)
- Three Order of the Red Banner (13 October 1942, 27 January 1943, 26 November 1944)
- Order of the Patriotic War 1st class (14 August 1943)
- Medal "For the Defence of Leningrad” (1943)

== Memorials ==
- In the village of Chkalovsk (as part of the city of Kaliningrad), on the Alley of Heroes of the 15th ward near the House of Officers, a bust of G. I. Davidenko was installed.
- A street in his native village of Stary Kovray is named after the Hero.
- Immortalized on the Monument to 1200 guardsmen in Kaliningrad and in the city of Liepaja at the "Memorial to the Baltic Pilots” at the Central Cemetery, and also on the Monument to the Baltic Pilots on Sovetsky Prospekt in Kaliningrad.

== Literature ==
- Shkadov, Ivan, ed. (1987). Герои Советского Союза: краткий биографический словарь I, Абаев - Любичев [Heroes of the Soviet Union: A Brief Biographical Dictionary I, Abaev - Lyubichev] (in Russian). Moscow: Voenizdat. p. 400.
- Burov, Abram (1970). Твои герои, Ленинград [Your heroes, Leningrad] (in Russian). Leningrad: Lenizdat. pp. 385–388.
- За мужество и отвагу: Документальные очерки о Героях Советского Союза — уроженцах Полтавы и Полтавской области [For Courage and Courage: Documentary Essays on the Heroes of the Soviet Union - natives of Poltava and the Poltava region] (in Russian) (2 ed.). Kharkiv: Prapor. 1984.
- Kuzmichev, V. (6 May 1944). "Воздушные разведчики: 225 боевых вылетов" [Air Scouts: 225 combat missions]. Красный Балтийский флот: ежедневная краснофлотская газета Краснознаменного Балтийского флота (in Russian). p. 2.
