= Vasily Mikhalyov =

Russian aviator (1917–2006)

- Василий Павлович Михалёв
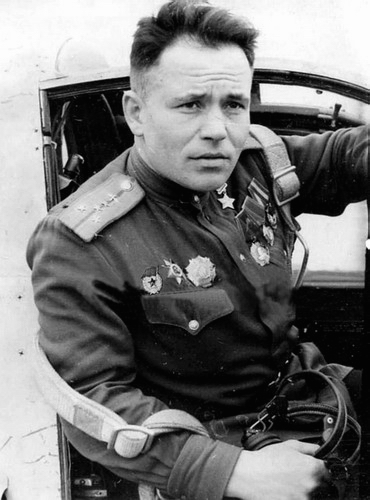
- Born: 20 March 1917; Verkhneudinsk
- Died: 10 December 2006 (aged 89); Samara, Russia
- Military career
- Allegiance: Soviet Union
- Branch: Soviet Air Force
- Rank: Colonel
- Conflicts: World War II
- Awards: Hero of the Soviet Union

Vasily Pavlovich Mikhalyov (Russian: Василий Павлович Михалёв; 20 March 1917 — 10 December 2006) was a Soviet fighter pilot during World War II. Awarded the title Hero of the Soviet Union on 1 July 1944 for his initial victories, he totaled over 20 solo aerial victories including an aerial ramming during the war, although the exact tally is subject to some dispute.
