= Vasily Davidenko (general) =

Vasily Ivanovich Davidenko
- Born: June 6, 1915 O.S. (June 19, 1915 N.S.); Privolnoe, Lisichansk volost, Bakhmut district, Yekaterinoslav province Russian Empire(modern Privolye, Luhansk region, Ukraine)
- Died: April 15, 2002; Moscow, Russia
- Military career
- Allegiance: Soviet Union
- Rank: lieutenant general
- Conflicts: Great Patriotic War
- Awards: Hero of the Soviet Union

Vasily Ivanovich Davidenko (June 19, 1915 - April 15, 2002) was a Soviet military figure, lieutenant general (1962). Hero of the Soviet Union (1943).

== Biography ==
He was born on June 6 (19), 1915 in the village of Privolnoe, Lisichansk volost, Bakhmut district, Yekaterinoslav province (now the city of Privolye, Luhansk region, Ukraine). In 1932 he graduated from the 7th grade of a school in the village of Privolnoe. He worked as a turner at the Artyom mine, and in January–November 1935 - as an underground electrician at the May 1 mine of the Lisichansk Mining Administration.

In the Red Army since November 1935. In 1938 he graduated from the Odesa Infantry School. From July 1938 he served as commander of a machine gun platoon and from October 1938 as commander of a machine gun company of the 80th Infantry Regiment of the 57th Infantry Division in the Trans-Baikal Military District. Member of the battles with the Japanese on the Khalkhin Gol River (Mongolia), while in the battle on August 21, 1939, during the final defeat of the Japanese grouping at Khalkhin Gol, the commander of the machine gun company of the 80th Infantry Regiment, Lieutenant V. I. Davidenko was shell-shocked and sent to the hospital. After recovery, he served in the same regiment. from November 1939 - senior adjutant of this regiment, from January 1941 - assistant chief of staff for intelligence of this regiment.

In October 1941 he was sent to study. In January 1942, he completed an accelerated course at the M. V. Frunze Military Academy, which was evacuated in the city of Frunze (Kyrgyzstan). Since January 28, 1942, he served as chief of staff of the 343rd rifle regiment of the 38th rifle division in the Central Asian military district (the regiment and division were formed in Alma-Ata at that time). In May 1942, the division arrived on the Southwestern Front, became part of the 28th Army and began hostilities.

Member of the Great Patriotic War: from May 1942 - chief of staff, and in August 1942 - May 1945 - commander of the 343rd (from March 1943 - 214th Guards) rifle regiment. He fought on the South-Western, Stalingrad, Don, Voronezh, Steppe, 2nd and 3rd Ukrainian fronts. He participated in the Battle of Kharkiv, the Voronezh-Voroshilovgrad operation, the Battles of Stalingrad and Kursk, the Belgorod-Kharkiv operation, the liberation of the Left-Bank Ukraine and the battle for the Dnieper, the Bereznegovato-Snigirevskaya, Belgrade, Balaton and Vienna operations. March 8, 1944 was seriously wounded in the left leg by a shell fragment and until August 1944 was in hospitals in the cities of Dnipropetrovsk and Odesa (Ukrainian SSR).

Particularly distinguished himself when crossing the Dnieper. On the night of September 25, 1943, the regiment under his command, using improvised means, crossed the Dnieper River and captured one of the islands on the river. On September 26, 1943, the regiment occupied the southern outskirts of the village of Borodaevka (Verkhnedneprovsky district of the Dnipropetrovsk region, Ukrainian SSR) and successfully repelled a counterattack to an enemy infantry regiment accompanied by tanks. On September 28, 1943, the regiment captured Borodaevka by storm and continued its offensive against enemy positions.

For the skillful command of the regiment and the courage and heroism shown in battles with the Nazi troops, by decree of the Presidium of the Supreme Soviet of the USSR of October 26, 1943, Lieutenant Colonel Vasily Ivanovich Davidenko was awarded the title of Hero of the Soviet Union with the Order of Lenin and the Gold Star medal.

After the war, until November 1945, he continued to command the same rifle regiment (in the Southern Group of Forces (YUGV), Romania). Since November 1945 - Head of the Advanced Training Courses for Infantry Officers of the Southern Group of Forces. From June 1946, he was deputy commander of the 61st Guards Rifle Division for combat units in the Southern Group of Forces, from November 1946 he commanded the 61st Mechanized Regiment in the 19th Mechanized Division of the 10th Mechanized Army, from April 1947, he was commander of the 80th Guards mechanized regiment of the 23rd Guards Mechanized Division in the Southern Group of Forces (Romania). and at the same time the head of the garrison of the city of Rymniku Sarat.

Since June 1948 - commander of the 324th separate guards rifle battalion of the 43rd separate guards rifle brigade (in the Taurida military district). From December 1950, he commanded the 15th Guards Rifle Regiment in the 2nd Guards Rifle Division in the Moscow Military District, and from August 1952, the 281st Rifle Regiment of the 341st Rifle Division in the Northern Military District). From December 1953 to November 1956 - commander of the 67th Infantry Division (in the Northern Military District). Then he was sent to study at the Higher Academic Courses at the Higher Military Academy named after K. E. Voroshilov, in January 1957 he was transferred to study at the main course of this academy.

In 1958 he graduated from the Military Academy of the General Staff. From November 1958 - 1st Deputy Commander of the 6th Army (in the Northern, from May 1960 - in the Leningrad military districts). from January 1961 - deputy commander of the Transcaucasian Military District for combat training and military educational institutions - head of the combat training department and universities of the district headquarters. Since November 1962 - head of the combat training department of the Main Directorate of Combat Training, and since March 1969 - Deputy Head of the Main Directorate of Combat Training of the Ground Forces of the USSR.

In May 1974 - November 1976 - assistant to the representative of the Commander-in-Chief of the Joint Armed Forces of the States Parties to the Warsaw Pact in Bulgaria for the ground forces. Since January 1977 - consultant of the Higher Officer Courses "Shot" (Solnechnogorsk, Moscow Region). Since September 1983, Lieutenant General V. I. Davidenko - retired.

Lived in Moscow. Worked on memoirs. Died April 15, 2002. He was buried at the Troekurovsky cemetery in Moscow.

== Military ranks ==
- lieutenant (5.06.1938)
- senior lieutenant (07/16/1940);
- captain (09/06/1942);
- major (26.02.1943);
- Lieutenant colonel (03/13/1943);
- Colonel (03/23/1944);
- Major general (08/08/1955);
- lieutenant general (04/27/1962)

== Works ==
- Davidenko V.I. The army is my destiny. - M., 1999. - 255 p.

== Literature ==
- Heroes of the Soviet Union: A Brief Biographical Dictionary / Prev. ed. Collegium I. N. Shkadov. - M .: Military Publishing House, 1987. - T. 1 / Abaev - Lyubichev /. — 911 p. — 100,000 copies. — ISBN ots., Reg. No. in RCP 87–95382.
- Kalashnikov K. A., Dodonov I. Yu. The highest command staff of the Armed Forces of the USSR in the post-war period. Reference materials (1945-1975). Volume 4. The command structure of the Ground Forces (army and divisional levels). Part two. - Ust-Kamenogorsk: "Media Alliance", 2019. - 586 p. - ISBN 978-601-7887-31-5. - P.152-156.
- Bulkin S.P. Heroes of the Fatherland. 2nd ed., rev. and additional - Donetsk, 1977. - S.112-113.
- Feats that have become legend. - Donetsk, 1985. - S.172-174.
