= Svanidze =

Svanidze is a Georgian surname, which may refer to:

The family associated with Joseph Stalin:

- Alexander Svanidze (1886–1941), brother-in-law of Stalin, executed during the Great Purge
- Ivan Svanidze (1927–1990), son of Alexander, briefly married to Stalin's daughter, Svetlana Alliluyeva
- Ketevan Svanidze (1880–1907), first wife of Joseph Stalin
- Nikolai Svanidze (1955–2024), Russian TV host of Georgian origin, cousin of Ketevan and Alexander

Other people with the surname:

- Irakli Svanidze
- Natela Svanidze (1926–2017), Georgian composer
- Rostyslav Svanidze (1971–2002), Ukrainian swimmer of Georgian origin
- Sandro Svanidze
