= Joseph Alliluyev =

Russian cardiologist

- Born: Iosif Grigoryevich Alliluyev; 22 May 1945
- Died: 2 November 2008 (aged 63)
- Occupation: Cardiologist
- Spouse: Yelena
- Parents: Grigory Morozov (father); Svetlana Alliluyeva (mother)
- Relatives: Joseph Stalin (grandfather)

Iosif Grigoryevich Alliluyev (Ио́сиф Григо́рьевич Аллилу́ев; 22 May 1945 – 2 November 2008) was a Soviet and Russian cardiologist and medical academic. A grandson of Soviet leader Joseph Stalin, he specialized in the diagnosis and treatment of chest pain and other cardiac conditions and was credited with more than 150 scientific articles and monographs on heart disease.

== Early life and family ==
Alliluyev was born in 1945 to Svetlana Alliluyeva and her first husband, the lawyer and academic Grigory Morozov, a school friend of Stalin’s son Vasily. His parents’ marriage ended in the late 1940s. When Alliluyeva married Yuri Zhdanov in 1949, Zhdanov adopted her son, who for a time used the surname Zhdanov before his original name and patronymic were restored in the mid-1950s.

Russian and international media accounts describe Alliluyev as the only one of Stalin’s grandchildren who personally knew their grandfather. He spent his childhood in Moscow and kept out of public life after Stalin’s death.

== Education and career ==
After finishing school, Alliluyev studied medicine at a Moscow medical institute and trained as a cardiologist. He worked for many years at the Clinical Center of the I. M. Sechenov Moscow Medical Academy, eventually becoming a professor, Doctor of Medical Sciences and an Honored Scientist of the RSFSR.

His clinical and research work focused on chest pain, coronary artery disease and cardiac emergencies. News reports and biographical notices credit him with more than 150 scientific articles and monographs on heart problems. His textbooks include Boli v oblasti serdtsa: differentsial'nyi diagnoz (Chest pain: differential diagnosis, 1985), Bol' v grudnoi kletke: diagnostika i lechenie (Chest pain: diagnosis and treatment, 2000) and the multi-author manual Neotlozhnaya kardiologiya (Emergency cardiology, 2004).

Despite his family background, Alliluyev generally avoided publicity. ABC News, citing Russian media, described him as “very discreet” about his origins, noting that he declined offers to write memoirs and seldom gave interviews. Channel One Russia similarly reported that he refused to write memoirs and “practically did not give interviews”; one of his rare interviews was later used in the documentary film Svetlana about his mother.

== Death ==
Alliluyev died suddenly in Moscow in early November 2008 at the age of 63. Russian media reported that he had been a well-known cardiologist and the only one of Stalin’s grandchildren to have met their grandfather. A biographical note on his father’s grave site states that he was buried at Moscow’s Novodevichy Cemetery, next to his grandmother Nadezhda Alliluyeva.

== In popular culture ==
Alliluyev’s childhood and relationship with his mother and grandfather have been discussed in biographies of Svetlana Alliluyeva and in television documentaries about Stalin’s family.
