= Alexander Svanidze =

Georgian Old Bolshevik and politician

- ალექსანდრე სვანიძე (Georgian); Александр Сванидзе (Russian)
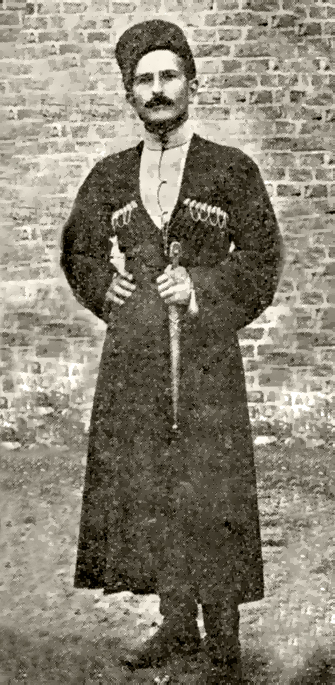
- Svanidze in 1915
- Born: 1886; Baji, Kutais Governorate, Russian Empire
- Died: 20 August 1941 (aged 54–55)
- Education: University of Jena
- Occupations: Old Bolshevik historian
- Known for: Brother-in-law of Joseph Stalin
- Spouse: Maria Korona
- Children: Ivan Svanidze
- Parent(s): Svimon Svanidze; Sipora Dvali
- Relatives: Kato Svanidze (sister)

Alexander Semyonovich "Alyosha" Svanidze (Georgian: ალექსანდრე სვანიძე; Russian: Александр Семёнович Сванидзе) (1886 – 20 August 1941) was a Georgian Old Bolshevik, politician and historian. He was a personal friend of Joseph Stalin and a brother of Stalin's first wife Kato. Nevertheless, he was arrested during the Great Purge in 1937 and he was shot in prison in 1941.

== Life and career ==
Born of a petty noble family in a small village of Baji in western Georgia, then part of the Russian Empire, Svanidze was educated at Tiflis and later at Jena where he learned German and English and engaged in historical research of ancient civilizations.

He joined the Russian Social Democratic Labour Party in 1901 and then the Bolsheviks in 1904. worked in the Bolshevik underground until being forced by the authorities to leave independent Georgia in 1919. He worked for the Soviet foreign office in the years 1920–1921 and then served as People's Commissar for Finances of the Georgian SSR and Transcaucasian SFSR in the years 1921–1922. In 1924, he was appointed Soviet trade envoy to Germany and, upon his return to the Soviet Union, in 1935, he became Deputy Chairman of the Soviet State Bank. For most of the 1930s he was head of the Soviet Foreign Trade Bank.

At the same time, Svanidze continued his scholarship; he founded the Journal of Ancient History, studied the Alarodian languages, and translated into Russian the medieval Georgian poet Shota Rustaveli.

At the height of the Great Purge, he was arrested by the NKVD. Svanidze refused to confess to being a German spy in return, as the NKVD offered him, for his life. "Such aristocratic pride," Stalin is quoted to have said. Svanidze and his sister Mariko were executed in 1941, as the Germans advanced. His wife Maria (née Korona; 1889–1941), a singer for the Tbilisi Opera House, was sentenced to ten years in Dolinskoye, a women's prison camp in Kazakhstan. She died of a heart attack upon being informed of the execution. His son, Ivan (born Dzhonrid in honour of John Reed) was married to Stalin's daughter Svetlana Alliluyeva from 1957 to 1959.

== Bibliography ==
- Alliluyeva, Svetlana (1967), Twenty Letters to a Friend, translated by Johnson, Priscilla, London: Hutchinson, ISBN 0-06-010099-0
- Fitzpatrick, Sheila (2015), On Stalin's Team: The Years of Living Dangerously in Soviet Politics, Princeton, New Jersey: Princeton University Press, ISBN 978-0-691-14533-4
- Montefiore, Simon Sebag (2007), Young Stalin, London: Phoenix, ISBN 978-0-297-85068-7
