= Yulia Meltzer =

Daughter-in-law of Joseph Stalin (1911–1968)

Yudith "Yulia" Isaakovna Meltzer (Russian: Юдифь "Юлия" Исааковна Мельцер; Ukrainian: Юдіф "Юлія" Ісааківна Мельцер; Hebrew: יהודית "יוליה" איסקובנה מלצר; 1911–1968) was a Jewish Ukrainian ballerina. She was the wife of Yakov Dzhugashvili, and the daughter-in-law of Joseph Stalin. She was the mother of Stalin's granddaughter, translator Galina Dzhugashvili.

== Early life and marriage ==
Meltzer was from a Jewish family in Odesa. She was twice married when she met Dzhugashvili at a reception, who fought with her second husband, an NKVD officer called Nikolai Bessarab, and arranged for her divorce. Bessarab was later arrested by the NKVD and executed. Dzhugashvili then became her third husband. Together they had one daughter, Galina (1938–2007).

Meltzer was reported imprisoned by Stalin between 1941 and 1943 after Yakov was imprisoned in a German concentration camp. She died of cancer at the Burdenko Main Military Clinical Hospital in Moscow, in 1968.
