= Yevgeny Dzhugashvili =

Soviet Air Force colonel (1936–2016)

- Евге́ний Я́ковлевич Джугашви́ли
- Born: Yevgeny Yakovlevich Golishev; 10 January 1936; Uryupinsk, Russian SFSR, Soviet Union
- Died: 22 December 2016 (aged 80); Moscow, Russia
- Citizenship: Russian, Georgian
- Education: Candidate of Military Sciences; Candidate of Historical Sciences; Zhukovsky Air Force Engineering Academy; Lenin Military-Political Academy
- Political party: Stalin Bloc – For the USSR, Communist Party of Georgia
- Children: Joseph Vissarionovich, Vissarion Dzhugashvili
- Parents: Yakov Dzhugashvili (father); Olga Pavlovna Golysheva (mother)
- Relatives: Galina Dzhugashvili (sister); Joseph Stalin (paternal grandfather); Kato Svanidze (paternal grandmother)

Yevgeny Yakovlevich Dzhugashvili (Russian: Евге́ний Я́ковлевич Джугашви́ли; 10 January 1936 – 22 December 2016) was a Soviet Air Force colonel. He was the son of Yakov Dzhugashvili, the eldest son of Soviet leader Joseph Stalin, and gained attention as a defender of his grandfather's legacy.

== Biography ==
Dzhugashvili resided in Georgia, his grandfather's homeland.

In the 1999 elections of the Russian State Duma, he was one of the faces of the Stalin Bloc – For the USSR, a league of communist parties.

He founded the New Communist Party of Georgia, which was registered with the electoral authorities on 14 June 2001. The party contested but did not win any seats in the June 2004 elections in Adjara.

In September 2009, Dzhugashvili made international headlines when he sued the Russian newspaper Novaya Gazeta after the magazine published an article claiming his grandfather personally signed execution orders against civilians. On 13 October 2009, the Russian court rejected Dzhugashvili's case, stating that its reasons would be made public at a later date. Dzhugashvili was given five days to appeal.

In January 2015, responding to Russian President Vladimir Putin's macho acts in a video, where he appears shirtless and is seen taming and riding a horse, Dzhugashvili said it is "all a publicity stunt and only showed how the president was leading the country without brains". The Independent additionally stated he had said "the mess in Russia would have been avoided if Stalin had lived for five more years".

He was found dead close to his home in Moscow in December 2016.

== See also ==
- Stalinism
- Neo-Stalinism
- Politics of Russia
