= Grigory Morozov =

Soviet and Russian jurist and scholar of international law

Grigory I. Morozov
- Григорий И. Морозов
- Born: 10 August 1921; Moscow, Russian SFSR, Soviet Union
- Died: 10 December 2001 (aged 80); Moscow, Russia
- Education: Moscow State Institute of International Relations
- Occupations: Jurist, academic
- Employer(s): Institute of World Economy and International Relations; Moscow State Institute of International Relations
- Known for: Scholarship on the United Nations and international organisations
- Spouse: Svetlana Alliluyeva (m. 1944; div. 1948)
- Children: Iosif Alliluyev

Grigory Iosifovich Morozov (Russian: Григорий Иосифович Морозов; 10 August 1921 – 10 December 2001) was a Soviet and Russian jurist and scholar of international law. He was regarded in Russian legal scholarship as a leading specialist on the law of international organisations and the United Nations, held the degree of Doctor of Juridical Sciences, served as a professor at the Moscow State Institute of International Relations (MGIMO) and as a chief research fellow at the Institute of World Economy and International Relations (IMEMO), and was an Honoured Scientist of Russia and honorary president of the World Federation of United Nations Associations.

He is also known as the first husband of Svetlana Alliluyeva, daughter of Joseph Stalin, and the father of the Moscow cardiologist Joseph Alliluyev.

== Early life and education ==
Morozov was born in Moscow on 10 August 1921. According to a biographical note in the Jewish Memorial virtual necropolis, his father, Iosif Grigorievich Morozov, worked in commerce before and after the Russian Revolution and later ran a private pharmacy in Moscow; his mother was Revekka Markovna Morozova. He attended a Moscow secondary school where he was in the same class as Stalin's son Vasily Stalin, and Svetlana Alliluyeva was a pupil at the same school.

With the outbreak of the Great Patriotic War, Morozov was conscripted into the Red Army, sent to the front and seriously wounded. After a long period in military hospitals he was discharged from active service.

Following demobilisation, he enrolled at the newly created Moscow State Institute of International Relations (MGIMO), specialising in international law, and graduated in 1949.

== Career ==
=== Early career ===
Biographical sources describe Morozov's early post-war career as difficult. In February 1948 his father was arrested on charges of making "slanderous statements" about Stalin and remained in prison until after Stalin's death in 1953. Against this backdrop and in the context of his family connection to Stalin's daughter, Morozov initially struggled to obtain stable academic or diplomatic work and relied on temporary jobs and occasional writing until his position improved in the 1950s.

He completed a kandidatskaya (candidate of sciences) dissertation on criminal responsibility for propaganda of aggression and later defended a doctoral dissertation on the United Nations as an international organisation, receiving the degree of Doctor of Juridical Sciences in 1961.

=== MGIMO and IMEMO ===
From the 1960s Morozov combined teaching at MGIMO with research at IMEMO, a think tank of the USSR Academy of Sciences. At MGIMO he was a professor in the Department of International Law, where he taught courses on the law of international organisations and the UN system. At IMEMO he rose to become a chief research fellow and headed a sector and later a department devoted to the study of international organisations, supervising research on the UN, collective security and peacekeeping.

Colleagues and memorial articles credit him with helping to form a "school" of research on international organisations in Soviet and Russian international law; a memorial volume on international organisations was later published in his honour.

=== Work on the United Nations and international organisations ===
Morozov's scholarship focused on the legal nature, structure and activities of the United Nations and other intergovernmental organisations. In monographs and journal articles he analysed the UN Charter, the relationship between law and the use of force in international relations, peacekeeping and sanctions, and the role of international organisations in the post-war world order.

A biographical entry on the Jewish Memorial site and an obituary in World Economy and International Relations describe him as among the first Soviet jurists to argue that international organisations should be studied as a distinct and complex object of international legal regulation rather than merely as instruments of state policy.

== Public roles and UN associations ==
Alongside his academic work, Morozov was active in public organisations related to the UN. He was involved in founding the Russian Association for the United Nations, part of the World Federation of United Nations Associations (WFUNA), and later served as honorary president of WFUNA.

== Selected works ==
Morozov was the author or co-author of numerous books and articles on international law and international organisations. Selected works include:

- Novyi shag k prochnomu miru (A New Step Toward a Durable Peace). Moscow, 1958.
- Organizatsiya Ob″edinennykh Natsii. Osnovnye mezhdunarodno-pravovye aspekty struktury i deyatel'nosti (The United Nations: Main International-Legal Aspects of Structure and Activity). Moscow: IMO, 1962.
- Mezhdunarodnye organizatsii. Nekotorye voprosy teorii (International Organisations: Selected Questions of Theory). 2nd ed., rev. and expanded. Moscow: Myslʹ, 1974.
- Terrorizm – prestuplenie protiv chelovechestva (mezhdunarodnyi terrorizm i mezhdunarodnye otnosheniya) (Terrorism – A Crime Against Humanity). Moscow, 1997; 2nd rev. ed., IMEMO RAS, 2001.
- OON na rubezhe XXI veka (krizis mirotvorchestva OON) (The UN on the Threshold of the Twenty-First Century: The Crisis of UN Peacekeeping). Moscow, 1999.

He was also an editor and contributor to multi-volume Soviet textbooks on international law, including the widely used Kurs mezhdunarodnogo prava (Course of International Law).

== Honours ==
Russian biographical and memorial sources state that Morozov was awarded the title of Honoured Scientist of the RSFSR (later Russia) and received several state decorations, including the Order of the Patriotic War, the Order of the Red Banner of Labour and the Order of Friendship of Peoples, in recognition of his wartime service and scholarly contributions.

== Personal life ==
In 1944 Morozov married Svetlana Alliluyeva, daughter of Joseph Stalin. Their son Iosif (Joseph) Alliluyev was born the following year. The marriage ended in divorce in 1948, and their son was later adopted by Alliluyeva's second husband.

Memoirs and biographical articles describe the family's situation as politically sensitive in the late Stalin years and note that Morozov's connection to Stalin's family, along with his father's arrest, complicated his early career.

== Death ==
Morozov died in Moscow on 10 December 2001 at the age of 80. He is buried at Vostryakovskoye Cemetery in Moscow, alongside his parents.

== See also ==
- Svetlana Alliluyeva
- Joseph Alliluyev
- Institute of World Economy and International Relations
- Moscow State Institute of International Relations
- World Federation of United Nations Associations
