= Kato Svanidze =

First wife of Joseph Stalin (1885–1907)

- კატო სვანიძე
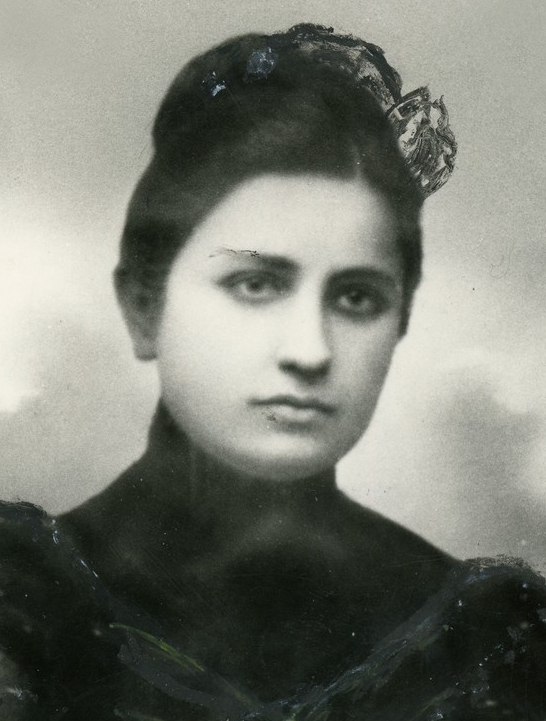
- Svanidze c. 1904
- Born: Ekaterine Svanidze; 2 April 1885; Baji, Kutais Governorate, Russian Empire
- Died: 22 November 1907 (aged 22); Tbilisi, Russian Empire
- Resting place: Kukia Cemetery, Tbilisi; 41°41′42.4″N 44°47′40.6″E
- Spouse: Ioseb Jughashvili (m. 1906)
- Children: Iakob Jughashvili
- Relatives: Alexander Svanidze (brother); Ivan Svanidze (nephew); Yevgeny Dzhugashvili (grandson); Galina Dzhugashvili (granddaughter); Nikolai Svanidze (cousin)

Ekaterine "Kato" Svanidze (Note: Georgian: ეკატერინე სვიმონის ასული სვანიძე, romanized: ek'at'erine svimonis asuli svanidze; Russian: Екатерина Семёновна Сванидзе, romanized: Yekaterina Semyonovna Svanidze) (2 April 1885 – 22 November 1907) was the first wife of Joseph Stalin and the mother of his eldest son, Yakov Dzhugashvili.

Born in Racha, in western Georgia, Svanidze eventually moved to Tiflis with her two sisters and brother, and worked as a seamstress. Her brother Alexander was a confidant of Stalin, then still known by his birth name of Ioseb Jughashvili, and introduced him to Svanidze in 1905. They were married in 1906 and she gave birth to son Yakov a few months later. The family moved to Baku to avoid arrest, though Svanidze got quite ill there and returned to Tiflis in 1907, dying shortly after her return, likely from typhoid or tuberculosis. Her death had a profound effect on Stalin, who deeply loved Svanidze. He abandoned Yakov to be raised by the Svanidze family, and rarely saw them again, fully immersing himself in his revolutionary activities.

== Svanidze family ==
Ekaterine Svanidze (Note: Some sources give her name as Ekaterina, which is the Russian version of her Georgian name) was born in Baji, Georgia, a small village in Racha, a region of Georgia, which was then part of the Kutais Governorate within the Russian Empire. Her parents were Svimon, a railway worker and landowner, and Sephora Dvali, both descendants of an impoverished minor Georgian nobility. She had two sisters, Aleksandra (Sashiko; c. 1878–1936) and Maria (Mariko; 1888–1942), and a younger brother, Alexander (Alyosha; 1886–1941). (Note: Georgian names are often shortened.)

== Early life in Tiflis ==
While their parents would move to Kutaisi, the four Svanidze siblings moved to Tiflis (now Tbilisi) and lived together in a house near Erivan Square (now Freedom Square) and behind the South Caucasus military district headquarters. Alyosha was a member of the Russian Social Democratic Labour Party (Bolsheviks) in Georgia and a confidant of Ioseb Jughashvili (later known as Joseph Stalin). The three sisters took up working at an atelier for a French seamstress, Madame Hervieu, making uniforms and dresses for military officers and their wives. Sashiko would marry Mikheil Monaselidze, (Note: Montefiore misspells the name as "Monoselidze" throughout his book; the actual name is Monaselidze (Georgian: მონასელიძე), a somewhat common Georgian surname.) another Bolshevik who also knew Jughashvili when they were students at the Tbilisi Theological Seminary.

In 1905, Alyosha invited Jughashvili to live with him, his three sisters and his brother-in-law, Mikheil Monaselidze. The atelier was frequented by the sisters' upper-class clientele, which combined with its central location, made it ideal for a hideout. "Our place above the suspicion of the police. While my fellows did illegal stuff in one room, my wife was fitting the dresses of generals' wives next door," Monaselidze later wrote. It is likely that Jughashvili first met Svanidze at this point, though it is possible he had previously hid out with her parents.

Jughashvili was soon interested in Svanidze; he would later describe her to his daughter Svetlana as "very sweet and beautiful: she melted my heart." According to Iremashvili, Svanidze herself "worshipped [Jughashvili] 'like a demigod' but understood him. She was fascinated by [Jughashvili], and enchanted by his ideas," finding him charming. But she was also, as Montefiore notes, an educated woman in her own right and had taken an active interest in Bolshevism, organising fundraisers for the Social Democrats and helping tend to wounded revolutionaries.

== Marriage ==
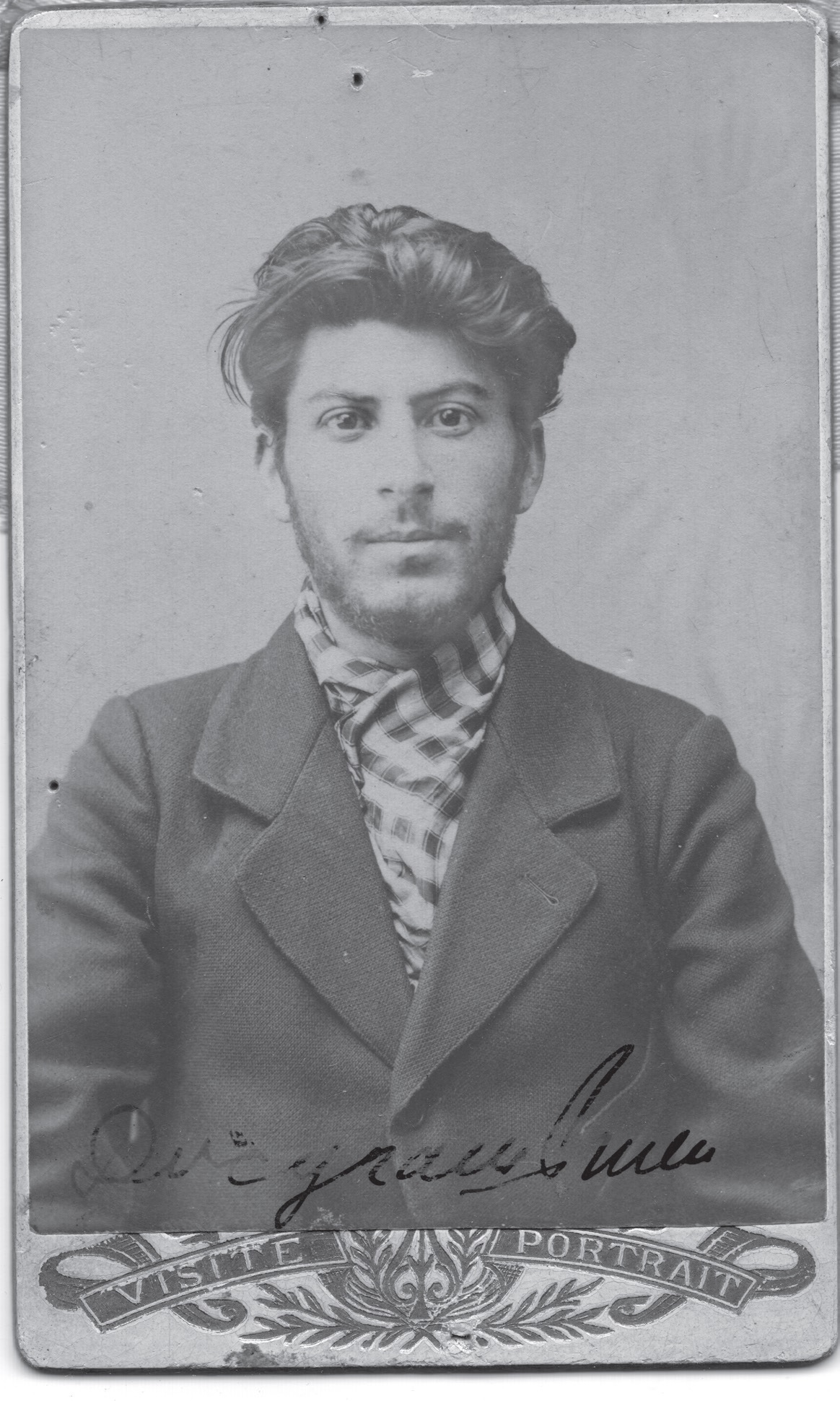
Jughashvili in a 1902 mugshot

By the summer of 1906, Svanidze and Jughashvili decided to get married. At the time, she was newly pregnant, and while it is not known if she was aware of this, historian Stephen Kotkin has suggested this was the impetus for the wedding. Much like Jughashvili's mother, Keke Geladze, Svanidze was very devout and insisted on a religious wedding in a church, which the atheist Jughashvili accepted. There was difficulty in finding a priest willing to marry them, as Jughashvili was using false documents with the name "Galiashvili," one of the aliases he was using at the time. Monaselidze eventually found a priest willing to perform the service, Kita Tkhinvaleli, who had also been a classmate of Jughashvili at the Seminary. However, Tkhinvaleli only agreed to do it if they held the wedding late at night. The wedding took place around 2:00am on 16 July 1906, in a church next to the Svanidze residence.

Afterwards, a small dinner party was held for the ten guests, with Mikhail Tskhakaya, a Bolshevik mentor to Jughashvili, serving as the tamada (toastmaster, an important figure at Georgian celebrations). Jughashvili did not invite his mother to the wedding, or even tell her about it beforehand. After the wedding, a police officer visited the house, though as Jughashvili had been paying him there were no arrests.

Despite the law requiring marriages to be recorded in one's internal passport, Svanidze did not do so, ostensibly to protect Jughashvili, who was known to the Okhrana, the imperial Russian secret police. She also continued to actively help the Bolsheviks, and in November 1906 hosted a contact from Moscow. This individual was a double agent and after he left, Svanidze and her cousin, Spiridon Dvali, were arrested on 13 November. Svanidze was jailed while Dvali, charged with making bombs, was sentenced to death. After six weeks in prison, Svanidze was released; she was let go both due to her condition (four months' pregnant), and Sashiko asking her clients from the atelier for help; Dvali's sentence was also commuted, and he was given a reduced sentence. Though released from prison, Svandize was not allowed back home, but instead housed at the police chief's home for two months. Jughashvili would frequently visit her, as the officers did not recognise him.

On 18 March 1907, Svanidze gave birth to a son, Iakob, (Note: Known by the Russian version of his name, Yakov.) with both Jughashvili and his mother present for the birth. (Note: Historian Simon Sebag Montefiore suggests the name was a tribute to Yakobi Egnatashvili, who had helped Jughashvili and his mother when he was young. See Montefiore 2007, p. 174) Jughashvili continued with his work after the birth of Yakov, though he would play with him at times, calling the child Patsan ("laddie"). A few months after Iakob's birth, Jughashvili was involved in a high-profile Tiflis bank robbery, and the three of them fled to Baku to avoid arrest. They rented a "Tartar house with a low ceiling on the Bailov Peninsula" just outside the city right on the sea. Svanidze tried to find a job, but with a small child to care for it was impossible to do so.

== Illness and death ==
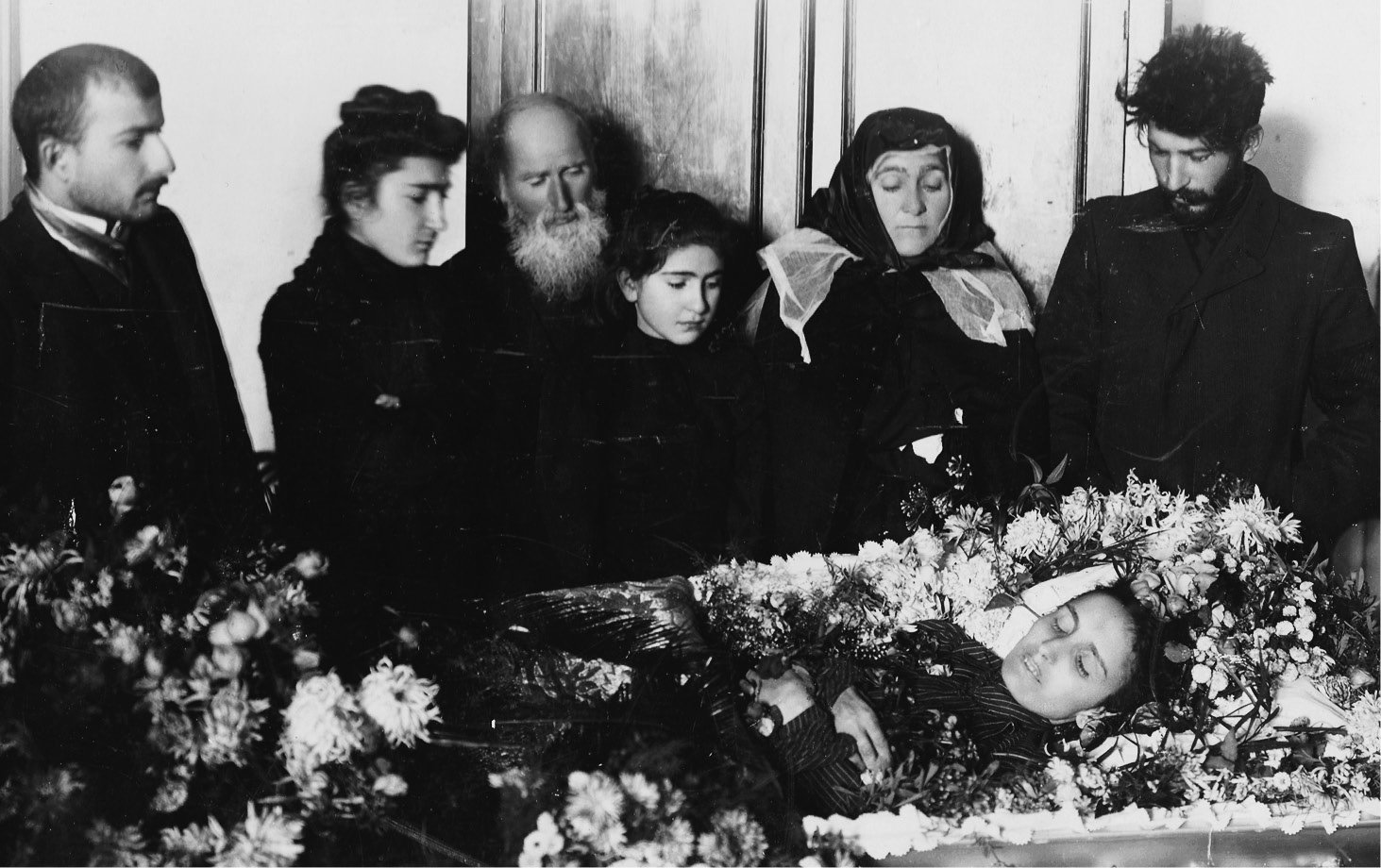
Funeral of Kato Svanidze, with family and husband Stalin (right)

Jughashvili was frequently away from home, leaving Svanidze alone in a place where she did not know many people. The stress of worrying about Jughashvili, as well as the isolation and warm climate took a toll on her health, and Svanidze soon fell ill. Her family invited her to move back to Racha, which has a much milder climate, to recover and be with people she knew, but Svanidze was reluctant to abandon her husband. By October, her condition had worsened, and Jughashvili was concerned enough he brought her back to Tiflis, though he soon returned to Baku. However, on the 13-hour journey back to Georgia, Svanidze drank some contaminated water, and likely contracted typhoid. In Tiflis, she began to hemorrhage blood from her bowels. Jughashvili visited her once, and she died on 22 November 1907, three weeks after her return to Tiflis. (Note: The exact cause of Svanidze's death is uncertain. Kotkin writes it was either typhus or tuberculosis (Kotkin 2014, p. 115), while Montefiore cites a relative of Svanidze present at her death who claims it was typhus (Montefiore 2007, p. 200).)

Her death was announced in a newspaper, Tsqaro (წყარო, "Source"), and a funeral was held at 9:00am on 25 November in the same church she had married Jughashvili. Svanidze was then buried at a church in the Kukia district of Tiflis. According to the Georgian Menshevik Ioseb Iremashvili, Jughashvili was very distraught at the death of his wife, and at the funeral allegedly said "This creature softened my heart of stone. She died and with her died my last warm feelings for humanity." He would also later tell a girlfriend that he "was so overcome with grief that [his] comrades took [his] gun away from [him]." During the burial, Jughashvili also reportedly threw himself into her grave, and had to be dragged out. As he had been trailed by Okhrana agents, Jughashvili fled before the service ended. He left Tiflis and returned to Baku, abandoning 8-month-old Iakob to be raised by his Svanidze relatives. Jughashvili did not return to visit his son for several years. (Note: Montefiore suggests that Iakob reminded him of Svanidze and her death.)

== Aftermath ==
Iakob spent the next fourteen years being raised by the Svanidzes. He was brought to Moscow in 1921 to live with his father; it proved a difficult transition for Iakob, who only spoke Georgian and did not understand Russian, and was treated poorly by his father. Other members of the Svanidze family also moved to Moscow, and Jughashvili, by now known as Joseph Stalin, would occasionally visit them.

Svanidze's brother Alyosha later married an opera singer, Maria Anisimovna Korona, and rose in the ranks of the Communist Party. Her sister Mariko also moved to Moscow and worked as secretary to Avel Enukidze. In 1937, during the Great Purge, Mariko was arrested as part of the accusations against Enukidze, who was executed shortly after. In 1938, Stalin ordered Alyosha and his wife, Maria, to be arrested. He demanded Alyosha admit he was a German spy, but Alyosha refused. Alyosha was executed in 1941, while Mariko and Maria were shot in 1942. Alyosha and Maria's son, Ivan Svanidze, was briefly married to Stalin's only daughter, Svetlana Alliluyeva. He filed for divorce in 1959; Soviet law required the divorce decree be printed in the newspaper along with their home addresses.

== Bibliography ==
- Javakhishvili, Giorgi (1939), სემინარიის კურსდამთავრებულები [Seminary Graduates] (in Georgian), National Parliamentary Library of Georgia
- Kotkin, Stephen (2014), Stalin, Volume 1: Paradoxes of Power, 1878–1928, New York City: Penguin Press, ISBN 978-1-59420-379-4
- Kun, Miklós (2003), Stalin: An Unknown Portrait, translated by Bodóczky, Miklós; Hideg, Rachel; Higed, János; Vörös, Miklós, Budapest: Central European University Press, ISBN 963-9241-19-9
- Montefiore, Simon Sebag (2007), Young Stalin, London: Phoenix, ISBN 978-0-297-85068-7
- Suny, Ronald Grigor (2020), Stalin: Passage to Revolution, Princeton, New Jersey: Princeton University Press, ISBN 978-0-691-18203-2
- Zenkovich, Nikolai (2005), Самые секретные родственники [The Most Secret Families] (in Russian), Moscow: OLMA-Press, ISBN 5-94850-408-5
