= Journal of Ancient History =

Academic journal

Vestnik Drevnei Istorii
- Discipline: Classics, Archaeology
- Language: English

Publication details
- History: 1937–present
- Publisher: Russian Academy of Sciences (USSR, Russia)
- Frequency: Quarterly

Standard abbreviations
- ISO 4: Vestn. Drevnei Istor.

The Journal of Ancient History (Russian: Вестник Древней Истории, Vestnik Drevnei Istorii) is a Russian bulletin founded in 1937. It publishes articles mainly on the ancient Orient, ancient Greece, ancient Rome, and recent archeological digs. It comes out four times a year. Circulation: over 3,000 copies (1971). The journal was established by the Georgian scholar and Bolshevik party functionary (as well as Joseph Stalin's former brother-in-law) Alexander Svanidze.
