= Yakov Dzhugashvili =

Red Army officer and Joseph Stalin's son (1907–1943)

- იაკობ ჯუღაშვილი (Georgian); Яков Джугашвили (Russian)
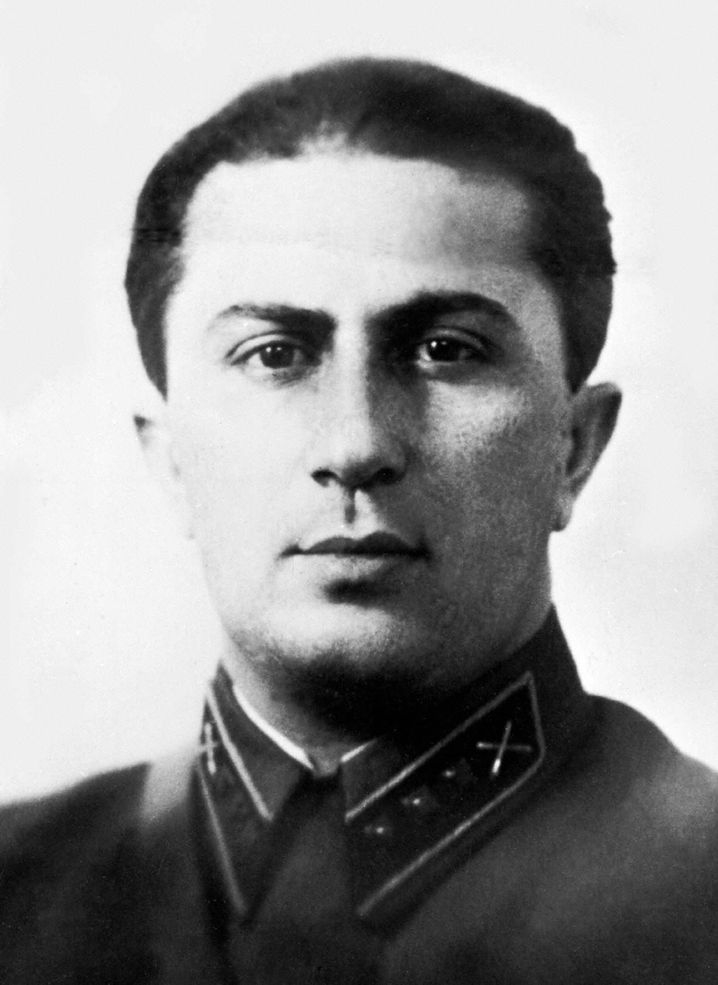
- Dzhugashvili in 1941
- Born: Iakob Iosebis dze Jughashvili; 31 March [O.S. 18 March] 1907; Baji, Kutais Governorate, Russian Empire
- Died: 14 April 1943 (aged 36); Sachsenhausen concentration camp, Oranienburg, Nazi Germany
- Spouses: Zoya Gunina; Yulia Meltzer
- Children: Infant daughter; Yevgeny Dzhugashvili; Galina Dzhugashvili
- Relatives: Joseph Stalin (father); Kato Svanidze (mother)
- Military career
- Allegiance: Soviet Union
- Branch: Red Army
- Service years: 1941–1943
- Rank: Lieutenant
- Conflicts: Second World War; Eastern Front; Operation Barbarossa; Battle of Smolensk (POW)
- Awards: Order of the Red Banner; Order of the Patriotic War

Yakov Iosifovich Dzhugashvili (Note: Georgian: იაკობ იოსების ძე ჯუღაშვილი, iakob iosebis dze jughashvili, [iakʼob iosebis dze dʒuɣaʃʷili]; Russian: Яков Иосифович Джугашвили, Yakov Iosifovich Dzhugashvili) (31 March [O.S. 18 March] 1907 – 14 April 1943) was a Georgian-born Soviet engineer and Red Army officer. He was the eldest son of Joseph Stalin, and the only child of Stalin's first wife, Kato Svanidze, who died nine months after his birth.

His father, then a young revolutionary in his late 20s, left the child to be raised by his late wife's family. In 1921, when Dzhugashvili had reached the age of 14, he was brought to Moscow, where his father had become a leading figure in the Bolshevik government, eventually becoming head of the Soviet Union. Disregarded by Stalin, Dzhugashvili was a shy, quiet child who appeared unhappy and attempted suicide several times as a youth. Married twice, Dzhugashvili had three children, two of whom reached adulthood.

Dzhugashvili studied to become an engineer, then—on his father's insistence—he enrolled in training to be an artillery officer. He finished his studies weeks before Nazi Germany invaded the Soviet Union in 1941. Sent to the front, he was captured and imprisoned by the Germans and died at the Sachsenhausen concentration camp in 1943 after his father refused to make a deal to secure his release.

== Early life ==
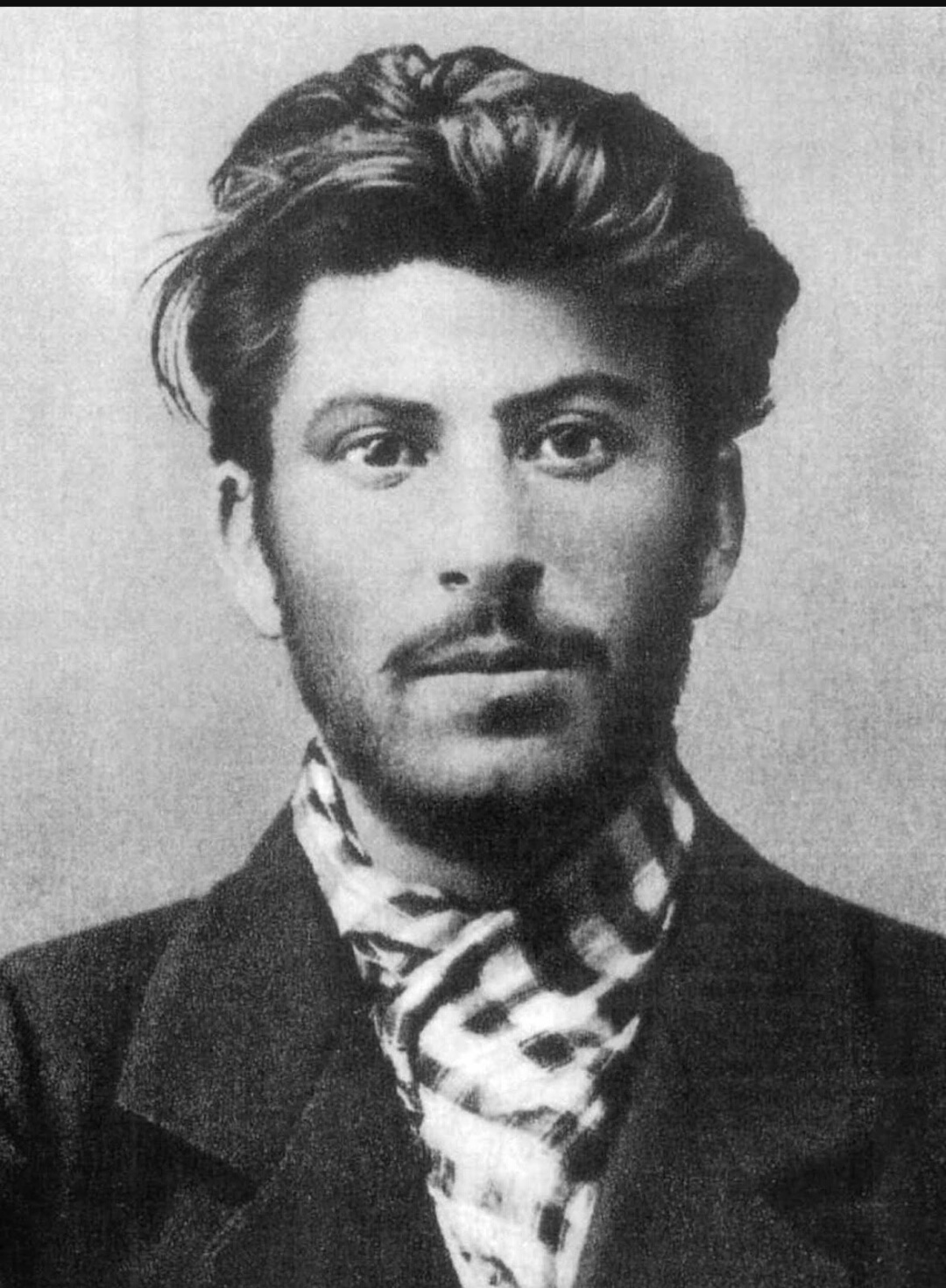
Father, Ioseb Dzhugashvili (Joseph Stalin)

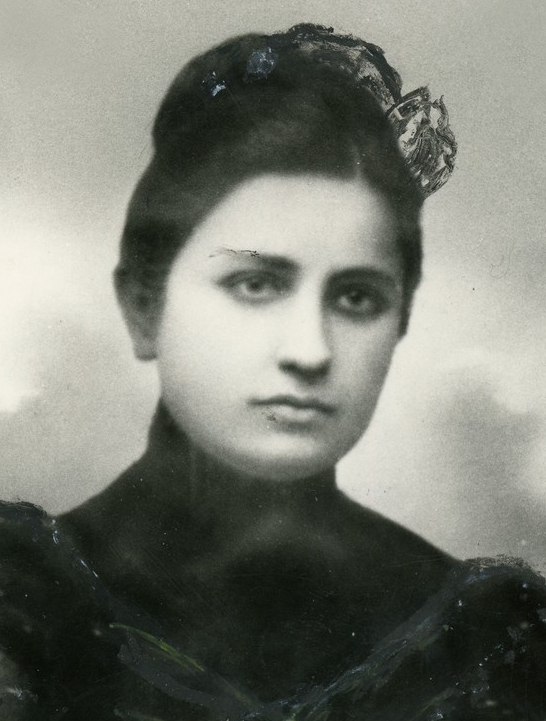
Mother, Kato Svanidze

=== Georgia ===
Dzhugashvili was born on 31 March [O.S. 18 March] 1907 in Baji, a village in the Kutais Governorate of the Russian Empire (now in Georgia). His mother, Kato Svanidze, was from Racha and a descendant of minor Georgian nobility. His father, Ioseb Dzhugashvili, was from Gori and was a Bolshevik revolutionary. (Note: Historian Simon Sebag Montefiore suggests the name was a tribute to Yakobi Egnatashvili, who had helped Jughashvili and his mother when he was young. See Montefiore 2007, p. 174) A few months after Dzhugashvili's birth, his father was involved in a high-profile Tiflis bank robbery, and the three of them fled to Baku to avoid arrest. They rented a "Tartar house with a low ceiling on the Bailov Peninsula" just outside the city right on the sea. They returned to Tiflis in October that year as Svanidze was quite ill. She died on 5 December [O.S. 22 November] 1907, having likely contracted typhus on the trip back. (Note: The exact cause of Svanidze's death is uncertain. Kotkin writes it was either typhus or tuberculosis (Kotkin 2014, p. 115), while Montefiore cites a relative of Svanidze present at her death who claims it was typhus (Montefiore 2007, p. 200).) Ioseb left Tiflis immediately after her death, abandoning eight-month-old Iakob to be raised by his Svanidze relatives. Ioseb, who later adopted the name Joseph Stalin, did not return to visit his son until several years later, and Iakob was raised by his aunts for the next 14 years.

=== Moscow ===
In 1921, Dzhugashvili was brought to Moscow to live with his father. His half-siblings Svetlana and Vasily were born after he moved. This proved difficult for Dzhugashvili as he did not understand Russian and his father was hostile to him, even forbidding him from adopting the name "Stalin". It is not clear why Stalin had hostility towards his son, but it is believed that he reminded Stalin of Svanidze, which was one of the happier times in Stalin's life. Living in Stalin's apartments at the Amusement Palace in the Kremlin, Dzhugashvili slept in the dining room. A kind individual, Dzhugashvili was close to his half-siblings, as well as his step-mother Nadezhda Alliluyeva, who was only six years older than him.

Though Dzhugashvili was interested in studying at a university, Stalin did not initially allow it, and it was not until 1930 when he was 23 that Dzhugashvili was admitted. He graduated from the Institute of Transport in 1935, and for the next few years worked as a chimney-sweep engineer at an electric plant factory named after his father. In 1937, he entered the Artillery Academy, and graduated from there on 9 May 1941.

== Marriages and family ==
Dzhugashvili's first serious relationship was with Zoya Gunina, the daughter of an Orthodox priest and a former classmate. In 1928, Dzhugashvili made it known that he wanted to marry Zoya, who was then 16. Stalin became enraged at the idea and in response Dzhugashvili attempted suicide, shooting himself in the chest and narrowly missing his heart. While Alliluyeva and Svetlana helped Dzhugashvili, Stalin is reported to have brushed off the attempt by saying "He can't even shoot straight." Dzhugashvili spent several months in the hospital recovering from this ordeal, though the couple did ultimately marry and moved to Leningrad. A daughter was born on 7 February 1929, but she died eight months later of pneumonia and Dzhugashvili and Gunina split up, although they did not officially divorce.

After his return to Moscow, Dzhugashvili was rumoured to be marrying Ketevan Orakhelashvili, the daughter of Mamia Orakhelashvili, the First Secretary of the Transcaucasian Socialist Federative Soviet Republic. However, Dzhugashvili was shy around her so she instead married Evgeni Mikeladze, a prominent orchestra conductor, earning ridicule from Stalin. His next girlfriend was Olga Golysheva, who was also a student at the Moscow Aviation School. They became engaged but soon that ended and she returned to her home in the Stalingrad Oblast. A son, Yevgeny was born on 10 January 1936, after Golysheva returned home. Dzugashvili only learnt of his son in 1938 and ensured he took his surname, though Stalin never recognised Yevgeny as his grandson.

Dzhugashvili married Yulia Meltzer, a well-known Jewish dancer from Odessa. After meeting Meltzer at a reception in a restaurant, Dzhugashvili fought with her second husband, an NKVD officer called Nikolai Bessarab, an aide to Stanislav Redens, the head of the Moscow Oblast NKVD and brother-in-law of Stalin. They soon were married. Historian Miklós Kun has suggested that Meltzer "must have been tempted to gain entry into Stalin's court by means of her marriage," though this did not work due to the animosity between Stalin and Dzhugashvili. They soon moved into an apartment together, though were only legally married on 18 February 1938, the day before their only child, daughter Galina, was born.

== Second World War ==
=== Capture ===
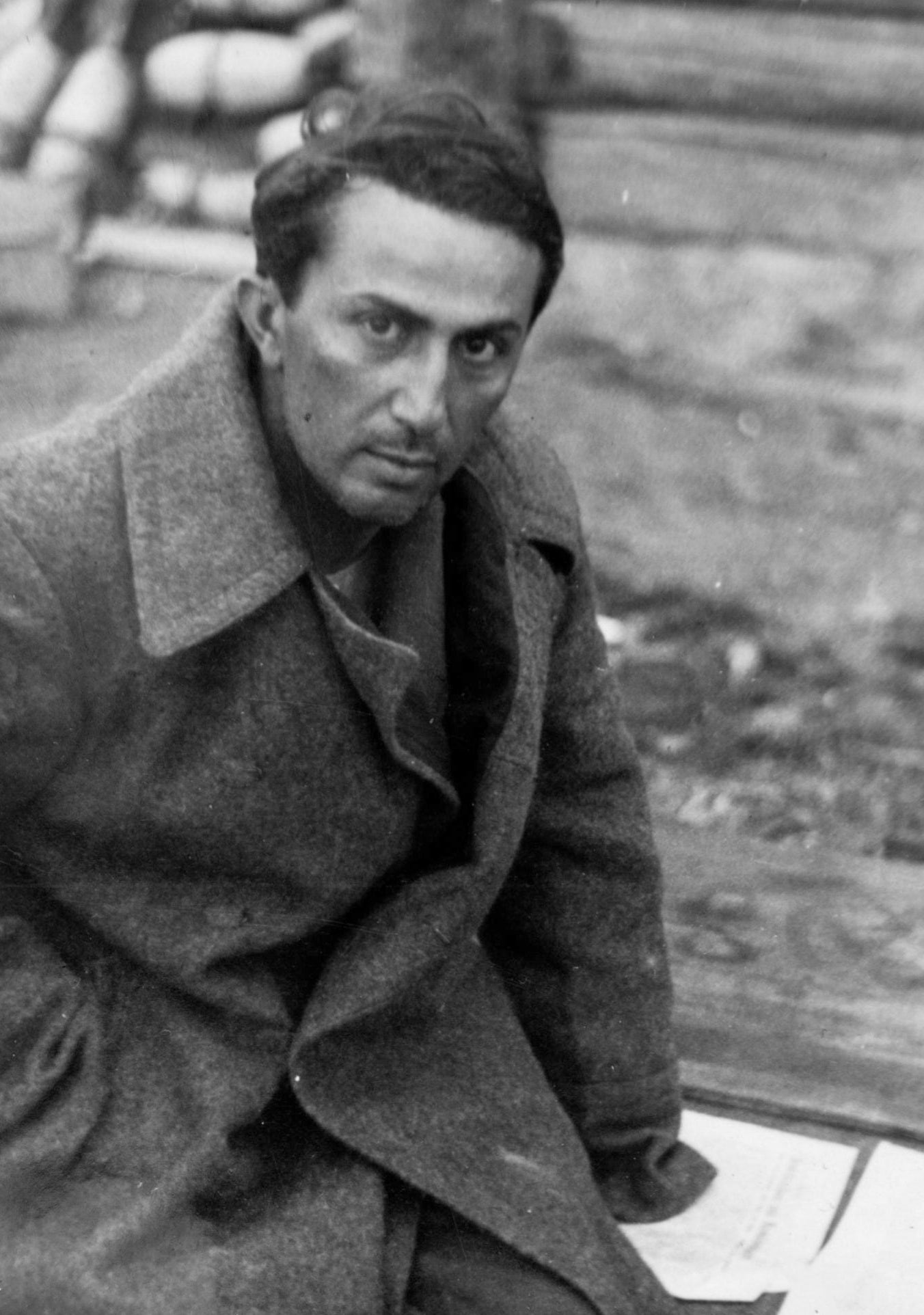
Dzhugashvili shortly after being captured

On 22 June 1941, Nazi Germany and its allies launched Operation Barbarossa, the invasion of the Soviet Union. Stalin ensured that Dzughashvili and Artyom Sergeyev, his adopted son and fellow artillery officer, went to the front lines. Serving as a lieutenant with a battery of the 14th Howitzer Regiment of the 14th Tank Division near Vitebsk, Dzhugashvili was captured on 16 July during the Battle of Smolensk. The circumstances of his capture are disputed: Sergeyev later said that "the Germans surrounded Yakov's battery. The order was given to retreat. But Yakov did not obey the order. I tried to persuade him ... but Yakov answered: 'I am the son of Stalin and I do not permit the battery to retreat." Other sources, including Soviet prisoners interrogated, claimed that they willingly gave up Dzhugashvili as they hated the Soviet system. Material from the Russian archives also suggests that he surrendered willingly.

The Germans announced the capture of Dzughashvili on 19 July. Stalin reacted negatively to the news: he had previously ordered that no soldiers were to surrender, so the idea that his own son had done so was seen as a disgrace. He was angry that Dzughashvili had not killed himself instead of being captured, and suspected that someone had betrayed him. Meltzer, his wife, was not immediately told the news and, suspicious of her motives and the idea that Dzhugashvili surrendered, Stalin had her arrested. With Meltzer imprisoned, Svetlana took care of Galina.

=== Prisoner of war ===
In an attempt to conceal his identity, Dzhugashvili apparently removed his officer's insignia and tried to pass as a common soldier, although he was soon recognised and transferred to the Abwehr (German military intelligence) for interrogation. During the interrogation, Dzughashvili openly criticised his division and other units of the Red Army, saying they were unprepared for the war, and further commented that military commanders behaved poorly. He felt that the United Kingdom was weak and had "never helped anyone", while praising Germany, noting it was the only major empire left and that the "whole of Europe would be nothing" without it. Although his wife and her family were ethnically Jewish, Dzughashvili was also openly anti-Semitic, claiming Jews "trade, or aspire to careers in engineering, but they do not want to be workers, technicians, or peasant laborers. That's why no one in our country respects the Jews."

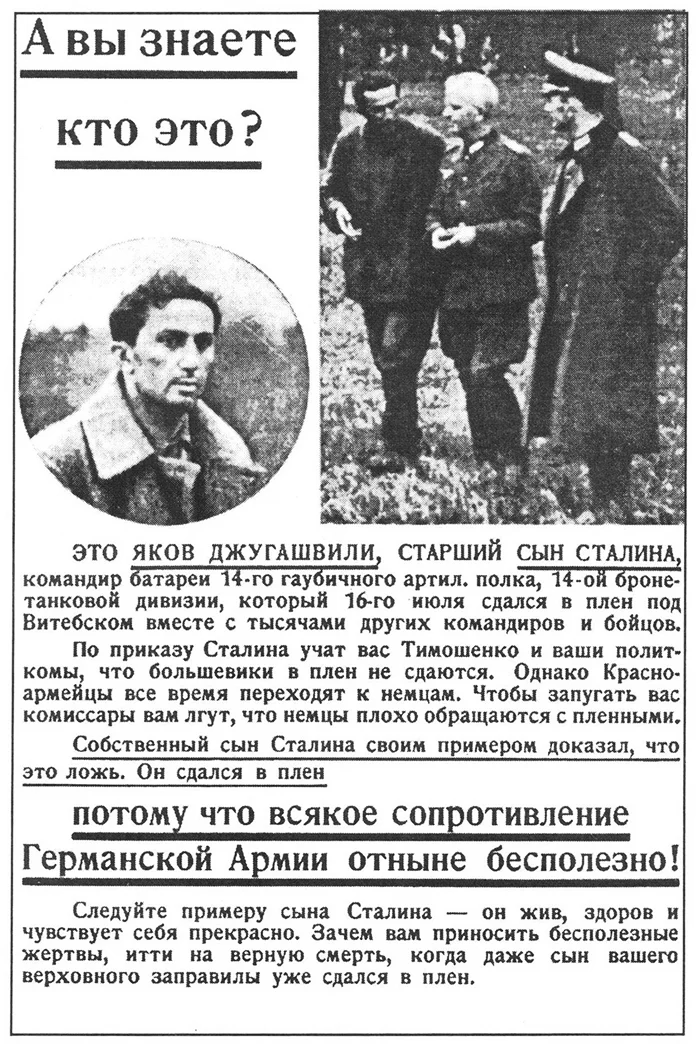
German 1941 propaganda saying: "This is Yakov Dzhugashvili, Stalin's son and artillery officer ... who on 16 July has surrendered near Vitebsk, together with thousands of other soldiers and officers ... Follow his example – he is alive and well, and feels great ... Why do you fight to the death when even the son of your leader has surrendered?"

The Germans intended to use Dzhugashvili in their propaganda against the Soviets. He was pictured on leaflets dropped over Soviet soldiers, shown smiling with his captors. The back of the leaflet was part of a letter he wrote to Stalin shortly after his capture: "Dear Father! I have been taken prisoner. I am in good health. I will soon be sent to a camp for officers in Germany. I am being treated well. I wish you good health! Greetings to everyone. Yasha." The Soviet Union responded in kind via propaganda: Krasnaya Zvezda ("Red Star"), the official newspaper of the Red Army, announced on 15 August 1941 that Dzhugashvili would be awarded the Order of the Red Banner for his actions during the Battle of Smolensk. He was subsequently moved to a guarded villa in Berlin, where Joseph Goebbels, the Nazi Propaganda Minister, hoped to use him on Russian-language radio broadcasts. When that failed to materialise, Dzhugashvili was moved to Oflag XC Lubeck then to Sachsenhausen concentration camp.

While interned there, Dzhugashvili was constantly frequented by visitors who wanted to meet and photograph the son of Stalin, meetings which began to distress him. He also quarrelled with the British prisoners, and would frequently get in physical altercations with them. After German field marshal Friedrich Paulus surrendered at the Battle of Stalingrad in February 1943, the Germans offered to exchange Dzhugashvili for him, although he specifically asked not to be exchanged for a field marshal. This was outright refused by Stalin, who later stated "Just think how many sons ended in camps! Who would swap them for Paulus? Were they worse than Yakov?" Soviet Foreign Affairs Minister Vyacheslav Molotov also recounted that Stalin refused to swap his son for Paulus because "All of them [Soviet prisoners of war] are my sons." According to Nikolai Tolstoy, there was a proposal from Adolf Hitler to exchange Dzhugashvili for his half-nephew Leo Raubal, but this was not accepted either.

=== Death ===
On 14 April 1943, Dzhugashvili died at the Sachsenhausen camp. Initially, the details of his death were disputed: one account had him running into the electric fence surrounding the camp. However, it had also been suggested that he was shot by the Germans; Kun speculated that it is "conceivable that he committed suicide: he had suicidal tendencies in his youth".

Upon hearing of his son's death, Stalin reportedly stared at his photograph; he would later soften his stance towards Dzhugashvili, saying he was "a real man" and that "fate treated him unjustly." Meltzer would be released in 1946 and re-united with Galina, though the years apart had made Galina distant from her mother. Dzhugashvili was posthumously awarded the Order of the Patriotic War, first class in 1977, although this was done secretly and the family was not allowed to collect the medal.

After the war, British officers in charge of captured German archives came upon the papers depicting Dzhugashvili's death at Sachsenhausen. The German records indicated that he was shot after he ran into an electric fence attempting to flee the camp after an argument with the British prisoners had ended; a postmortem showed he died from electrocution before he was shot. The British Foreign Office briefly considered presenting these papers to Stalin at the Potsdam Conference as a gesture of condolence. They scrapped the idea because neither the British nor the Americans had informed the Soviets that they had captured key German archives, and sharing those papers with Stalin would have prompted the Soviets to inquire about the source of these records.

== See also ==
- Heinz Hitler
- Mao Anying
- Bruno Mussolini
- Quentin Roosevelt

== Bibliography ==
- Allilueva, Svetlana (1967), Twenty Letters to a Friend, translated by Johnson, Priscilla, London: Hutchinson, ISBN 0-060-10099-0
- Chuev, Felix (1993), Molotov Remembers: Inside Kremlin Politics, Chicago: I.R. Dee, ISBN 1-56663-027-4
- Eckert, Astrid M. (2012), The Struggle for the Files: The Western Allies and the Return of German Archives after the Second World War, translated by Geyer, Dona, New York City: Cambridge University Press, ISBN 978-0-5218-8018-3
- Kotkin, Stephen (2014), Stalin, Volume 1: Paradoxes of Power, 1878–1928, New York City: Penguin Press, ISBN 978-1-59420-379-4
- Kotkin, Stephen (2017), Stalin, Volume 2: Waiting for Hitler, 1929–1941, New York City: Penguin Press, ISBN 978-1-59420-380-0
- Kun, Miklós (2003), Stalin: An Unknown Portrait, translated by Bodóczky, Miklós; Hideg, Rachel; Higed, János; Vörös, Miklós, Budapest: Central European University Press, ISBN 963-9241-19-9
- Montefiore, Simon Sebag (2003), Stalin: The Court of the Red Tsar, London: Phoenix, ISBN 978-0-7538-1766-7
- Montefiore, Simon Sebag (2007), Young Stalin, London: Phoenix, ISBN 978-0-297-85068-7
- Paterson, Tony (17 February 2013), "Joseph Stalin's hated son surrendered to the Nazis, archives reveal", The Independent, London, archived from the original on 25 September 2015
- Radzinsky, Edvard (1997), Stalin: The First In-Depth Biography Based on Explosive New Documents from Russia's Secret Archives, translated by Willetts, H.T., New York City: Anchor Books, ISBN 0-385-47954-9
- Tolstoy, Nikolai (1978), The Secret Betrayal, New York City: Charles Scribner's Sons, ISBN 0-684-15635-0
- Zenkovich, Nikolai (2005), Самые секретные родственники [The Most Secret Families] (in Russian), Moscow: OLMA-Press, ISBN 5-94850-408-5
