= Ivan Svanidze =

Soviet academic

- Born: Dzhonrid Alexandrovich Svanidze; 15 October 1927; Berlin, Germany
- Died: 3 August 1987 (aged 59)
- Other names: Dzhonrid, Dzhonik, Vano
- Education: Moscow State University, USSR Academy of Sciences
- Occupations: writer, academic, historian
- Spouse: Svetlana Alliluyeva (1962–63)
- Parent: Alexander (1886–1941)
- Relatives: Kato Svanidze (aunt)

Ivan Alexandrovich Svanidze (Russian: Иван Александрович Свани́дзе; Georgian: ივანე ალექსანდრეს ძე სვანიძე; Ivane Aleksandres dze Svanidze; 1927–1987), was a Soviet academic who specialized in agriculture and African Studies. He was the nephew of Joseph Stalin through his first wife, Kato Svanidze, and the third husband of Stalin's youngest daughter, Svetlana Alliluyeva.

== Early life ==
Svanidze was the son of Old Bolshevik Alexander Svanidze and Maria Anisimovna (née Korona). His parents were Georgians; his father's family were minor nobility from Kutais Governorate. His mother was from a Jewish family in Tiflis, and was an opera singer at the Tiflis Opera and Ballet Theatre.

Their son was born in Berlin, Weimar Republic, where his father was working as part of a trade mission. They named him Dzhonrid (Russian: Джонрид) after American socialist John Reed, best known for his account of the Russian Revolution, Ten Days That Shook the World. His name was Russified "Dzhonrid", and he was often called "Dzhono", "Dzhoni" or "Vano." He also used the name Ivan, the Russian version of John.

== Education and career ==
He graduated from Moscow State University with a degree in history. In 1964, he received a Ph.D. from the USSR Academy of Sciences's Institute of African Studies. He received a second doctorate in economics in 1978.

== Bibliography ==
- Сельское хозяйство Северной Родезии (Agriculture of Northern Rhodesia), Moscow, 1963.
- Динамизация сельского хозяйства стран Африки (Dynamization of African Agriculture), Institute of African Studies, c 1969.
- Проблемы развития сельского хозяйства Африки (The Problems of African Agricultural Development), Nauka, Moscow, 1969.
- Сельское хозяйство Тропической Африки (Agriculture in Tropical Africa), Thought, Moscow, 1972.
- Сельское хозяйство и аграрный строй Тропической Африки (Agriculture and Agrarian Systems in Sub-Saharan Africa), Nauka, Moscow, 1977.
- Южная Родезия (Southern Rhodesia), with Tamara G. Janjgava), Thought, Moscow, 1977.
- Лесото; Свазиленд (Lesotho; Swaziland), Moscow, Thought, 1978.
