= Yuri Zhdanov =

Russian chemist (1919–2006)

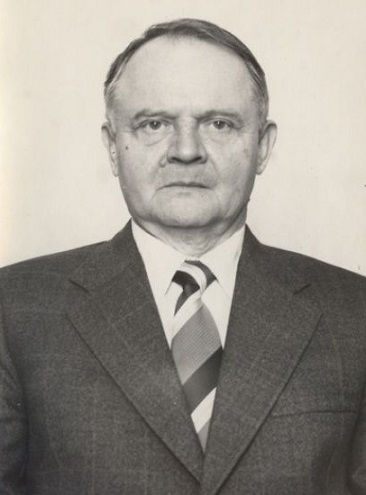
- Born: Yuri Andreyevich Zhdanov; August 20, 1919; Tver, RSFSR
- Died: December 19, 2006 (aged 87); Rostov-on-Don, Russia

Yuri Andreyevich Zhdanov (Russian: Ю́рий Андре́евич Жда́нов; 20 August 1919 – 19 December 2006) was a Soviet and Russian scientist, chemist. Doctor of Sciences in Chemical Sciences (1960), professor and rector of the University of Rostov (1957–1988). He was the son of Soviet politician Andrei Zhdanov and a former husband of Svetlana Alliluyeva, the daughter of Joseph Stalin.

== Biography ==
Yuri Zhdanov was born on August 20, 1919, in Tver. He graduated from Moscow State University in 1941 with a degree in organic chemistry and served with the Red Army during World War II. He received a Ph.D. in 1948.

In 1947, he was appointed head of the Central Committee's Science Department. He was sympathetic to genetics, which at the time was being ferociously attacked in the Soviet Union as "bourgeois science" by followers of Lysenkoism. As head of the department, he publicly criticised the scientific theories of Trofim Lysenko at a meeting with party propagandists and was subsequently rebuked by Joseph Stalin at a Politburo meeting ("Don't you know that our entire agriculture depends on Lysenko?").

He married Svetlana Alliluyeva in the spring of 1949 "as a matter of hard common sense but without any special love or affection". Joseph Stalin respected the Zhdanov family and had always hoped the two families would be linked in marriage. They soon divorced in 1952. They had a daughter Yekaterina in 1950.

He joined Rostov State University in 1953, becoming a member of the Soviet Academy of Sciences and eventually Rector of the University. He was the author of numerous papers on organic chemistry.

In 1950 as the member of Soviet political leadership Zhdanov took active role in the implementation of the national policy of antisemitism. In his later year while being the Rector of Rostov State University and the Chair of the North-Caucasian Scientific Center of Higher Education he established the atmosphere of ethnic and religious tolerance. At that time most Soviet colleges and universities had severe quota on Jewish students and faculty. Many Jewish students from different regions of the Soviet Union were coming to Rostov-on-Don knowing that they would be admitted to local colleges and university. Most colleges and universities of the Rostov-on-Don region under the leadership of Zhdanov employed Jewish faculty and staff. Three out of five scientific research institutes of Rostov State University were headed by Jews.

He died on 19 December 2006 in Rostov-on-Don.

== Awards ==
- Order "For Merit to the Fatherland", 4th class
- Two Orders of Lenin
- Order of the Patriotic War, 2nd class
- Order of the Red Star
- Order of the October Revolution
- Two Orders of the Red Banner of Labour
- Medal of Zhukov
- USSR State Prize
