= Main Military Medical Directorate (Russia) =

Specialist medical corps of the Russian Armed Forces

Coordinates: 55°44′56″N 37°36′8″E

- Sleeve patch of the directorate
- Active: 1805–present
- Country: Russian Empire (1805–1917); Soviet Union (1922–1992); Russia (1992–present)
- Type: Medical corps
- Role: Provide healthcare for all the military personnel in the Armed Forces
- Size: 100,000
- Part of: Ministry of Defense
- Garrison/HQ: Znamenka 19, Moscow, RU
- Nicknames: "ГВМУ", GVMU
- Engagements: World War I; World War II; Soviet-Afghan war; Dagestan war; First Chechen War; Second Chechen War; Russian operation in Syria; Nagorno-Karabakh war

Commanders
- Current commander: Dmitry Trishkin

The Main Military Medical Directorate, (Russian: Главное военно-медицинское управление Министерства обороны Российской Федерации) also known as Military Medical Directorate, a successor of Soviet Military Medical Directorate, is the specialist medical corps in the Russian Ministry of defense and it was part of the Soviet Armed Forces. Now, it is part of the Russian Armed Forces which provides medical services to all Army personnel and their families, in war and in peace.

The headquarters is located in the Main Building of the Ministry of Defense at Znamenka 19, Moscow, Russia.

== History ==
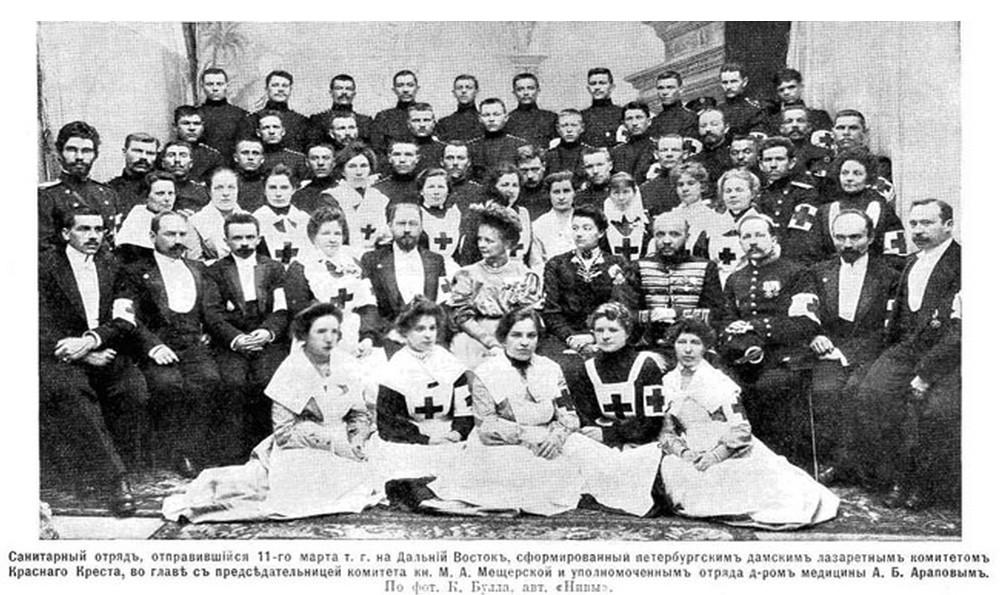
Sanitary unit which formed in Saint-Petersburg on March 11, 1904, and was sent to Russian Far East. Photo by Carl Bulla for "Niva" Journal.

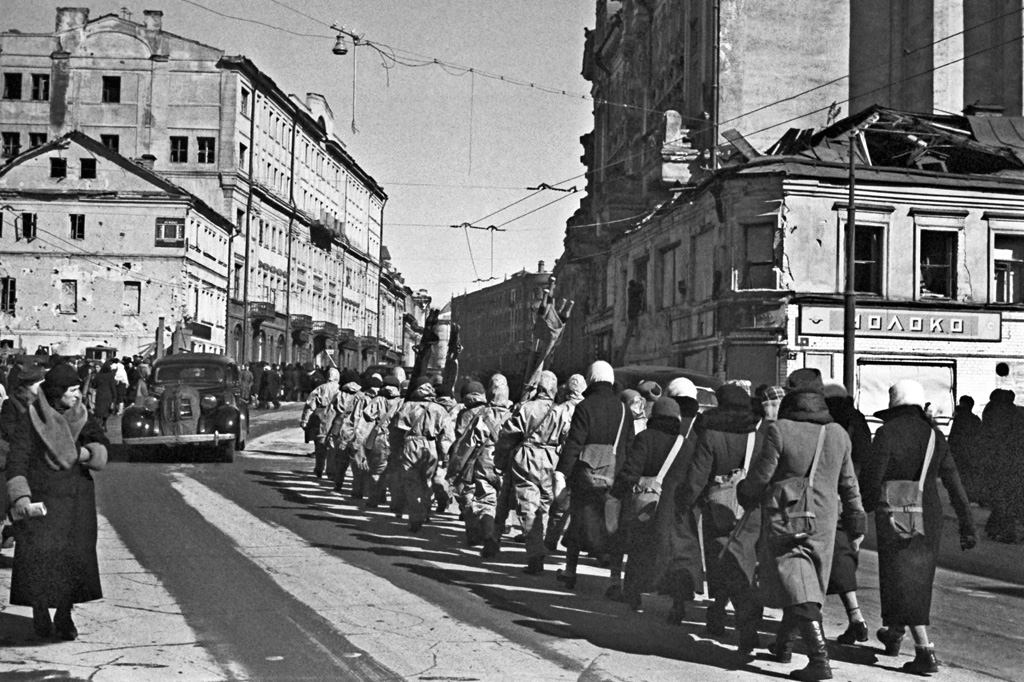
Sanitary detachment marching in Moscow streets, November 20, 1941.

Previously, military corps in Russia were formed as Medical Expedition in the Russian Army (Медицинская экспедиция при Военном министерстве России) in, 1805.

Since 1867, it was renamed as the 'Main Medical Department'. In 1909, it was renamed to 'Main Military Sanitary Directorate' (Главное военно-санитарное управление).

During Soviet regime, the Military Medical Department changed its name many times: In 1924, it became the Military Sanitary Directorate of the Red Army (ВСУ РККА). In 1936: Sanitary Directorate, and during World War II, in 1941, the department was called again as the Main Military Sanitary Directorate (ГВСУ).

In 1946, the Directorate carried the current name: Main Military Medical Directorate of the Soviet Armed Forces (ГВМУ ВС СССР).

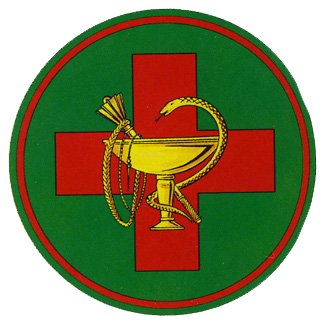
Logo of the directorate in use from 2004 to 2015

In 1960, it simply was called the Military Medical Directorate (or the Center for Military Medical Directorate)

After the dissolution of the USSR, the Military medicine was subordinate to the Russian Armed Forces in 1992, and became Main Military Medical Directorate of the Russian Military (Russian: ГВМУ ВС РФ).

== Structure ==
More than 100,000 medical specialists are working in the Military medicine system, including 23,000 doctors. The Military services built with 70 military medical organizations, with about 4 million workers.

== Missions ==
- Preservation and strengthening the health of the military personnel;
- Improving accessibility and quality of healthcare for all contingents have the right to legislate on health care at the expense of the Russian Defense Ministry;
- Strengthening the material-technical base of military medical units and institutions;
- Comprehensive re-modern medical equipment of health centers of military units, the sanitary and epidemiologic institutions and military hospitals;
- Participation in the implementation of federal target programs;
- Integration with civilian health institutions in order to preserve and promote the health of family members of military personnel and veterans of the Armed Forces;
- Institutionalization of warning systems, expertise, monitoring and correction of the health for young people at all stages, starting with the pre-conscription period
- Tightening of the barrier function when calling up citizens for military service in order to prevent patients in the Armed Forces;
- Close cooperation of military control bodies with legislative and executive authorities, both at the federal and at the regional level on issues of manning the Armed Forces healthy replenishment;
- Sustainable sanitary and epidemiological welfare of the personnel and the deployment of troops (forces) areas on the basis of strict compliance with the statutory provisions governing the conditions of life and military life, trouble-free operation of all life-support systems of military camps;
- Prevention of the most pressing for the army and navy of diseases, especially infectious diseases, mental health, drug addiction, alcoholism, diseases of the skin and subcutaneous tissue injuries;
- Formation of the personnel of the Army and Navy active life position in matters of health protection;
- Priority financing of expenditure on military health care, including at the expense of extra-budgetary sources;
- Creation of conditions for the guaranteed medical support attachments contingents.

== Commanders ==
#	Name	Military rank	Took office	Left office	Notes
1	Eduard Nechaev	Colonel General of Medical services	1992	1993	
2	Ivan Chij	Colonel General of Medical services	1993	2004	
3	Igor Bykov	Colonel General of Medical services	2004	2007	
4	Vladimir Shappo	Lieutenant General	2007	2009	
5	Alexander Belevitin	Major General	June 8, 2009	2011	
6	Aleksander Vlasov	Colonel	2011	2011	acting
7	A. Kalmykov	General	2011	2012	
8	Aleksander Vlasov	Colonel	2012	2012	acting
9	Vyacheslav Novikov	General of the Army	October 2012	January 14, 2013	acting
10	Aleksandr Fisun	Major General	February 19, 2013	November 28, 2016	
10	Aleksandr Vlasov	Major General	November 28, 2016	December 2016	acting
11	Dmitry Trishkin	Major General	December 2016		acting

== See also ==
- Kirov Military Medical Academy (founded in 1798)
- Army Medical Department (United States)
- Royal Army Medical Corps (United Kingdom)
- Combat medic
- Military academies in Russia § Kuybyshev Military Medical Academy
