= Nikolai Svanidze =

Russian television presenter (1955–2024)

- Николай Сванидзе
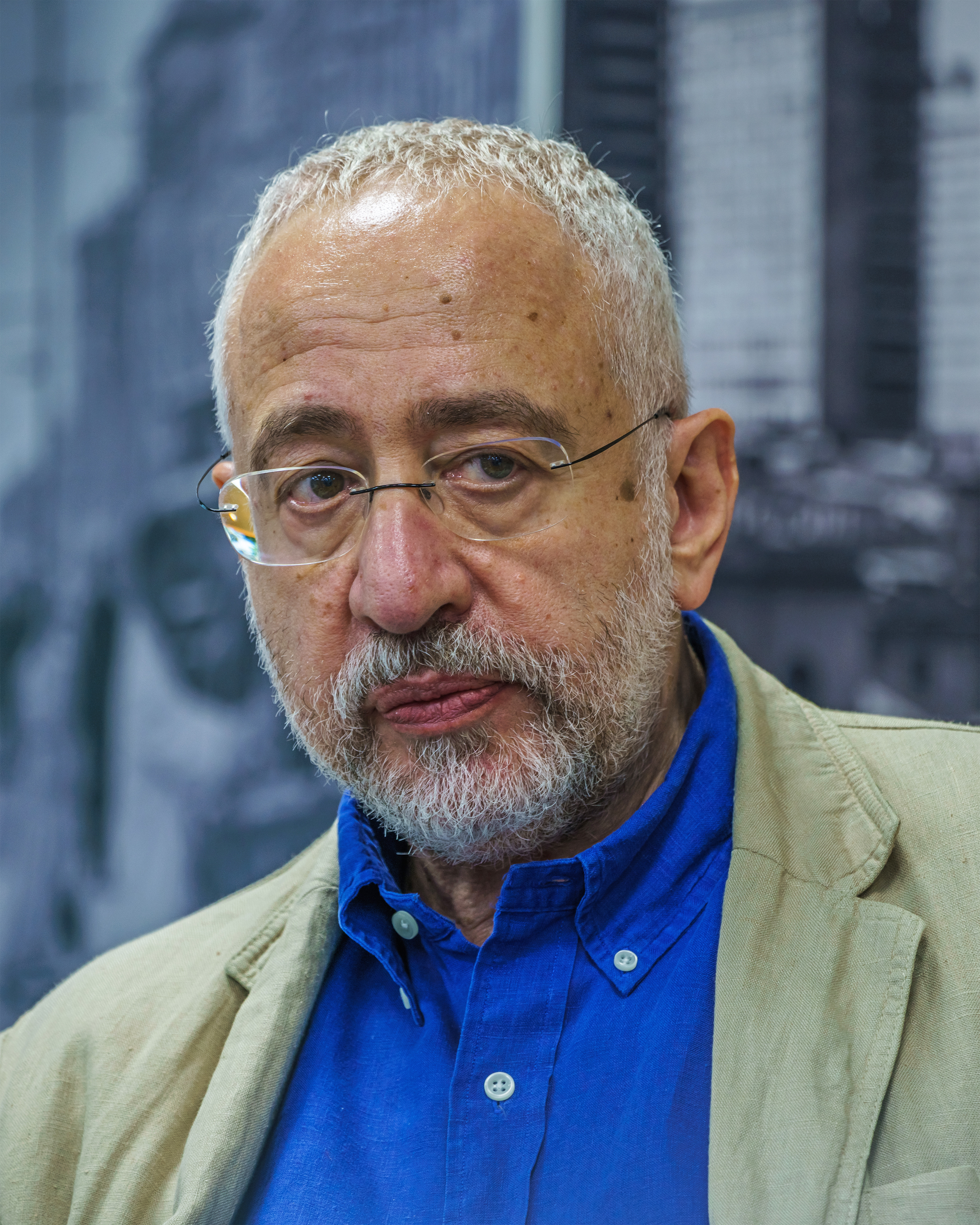
- Svanidze in 2019
- Born: Nikolai Karlovich Svanidze; 2 April 1955; Moscow, Russian SFSR, USSR
- Died: 11 September 2024 (aged 69); Moscow, Russia
- Citizenship: Russia
- Education: Moscow State University (Faculty of History, 1977)
- Occupations: Journalist; TV presenter; radio host; historian
- Years active: 1991–2024
- Employer(s): All-Russia State Television and Radio Broadcasting Company; Russian State University for the Humanities

Nikolay Karlovich Svanidze (Russian: Николай Карлович Сванидзе; 2 April 1955 – 11 September 2024) was a Russian television and radio host and member of the Public Chamber of Russia.

== Biography ==
Nikolai Karlovich Svanidze was named after his paternal grandfather Nikolai Samsonovich Svanidze.

The grandfather, Nikolai Samsonovich Svanidze, was a distant relative of Joseph Stalin's first wife Kato Svanidze — who took an active part in the October Revolution and served as a high-ranking official in the Transcaucasian Socialist Federative Soviet Republic under the protection of Sergo Ordzhonikidze. The grandfather was married to Zilya Isaakovna Luskina, also a Bolshevik revolutionary of Jewish origin who worked at the Zhenotdel structure. In 1937 he was arrested and executed among other Georgian officials who promoted exclusive rights for the Georgian SSR, including xenophobic laws for non-Georgian residents. The mother of Nikolay Karlovich was Adelaida (Ada) Anatolievna Svanidze (born Kryzanowskaya), a Soviet and Russian historian, professor and doctor of sciences.

Nikolai Karlovich Svanidze graduated from the History Department of Moscow State University in 1977. In 1977–1990 he was a research fellow in the Institute for US and Canadian Studies. Since 1991 he has worked for the All-Russia State Television and Radio Broadcasting Company and has been a host on its Russia TV channel, in 1996–2007 authoring and hosting the weekly analytical program "Zerkalo" ('Mirror'). Both of his grandfathers were executed under Stalin's regime in 1937. The rest of his family, during the repressions of 1939, was sent to the Gulag.

In February 1997 – May 1998 Svanidze was the chairman of the company, appointed by President Boris Yeltsin. In an interview Svanidze himself confessed that as a TV host on the side of the government he was heavily involved in the 1999 parliamentary election campaign, attacking the Communist Party of the Russian Federation and the Fatherland – All Russia block. In 2003 Svanidze started to make the TV documentary series Historical Chronicles, highly critical of the Bolsheviks and Joseph Stalin in particular, in each part telling about a personality from a single year of the 20th century history of Russia. In 2005 he became a member of the Public Chamber of Russia. In 2008 together with his wife Marina Svanidze, he published the book Medvedev based on interviews with Russian president Dmitry Medvedev.

At the end of December 2022, Nikolai Svanidze's health began to deteriorate. In early February 2023, he was hospitalized with severe pneumonia. He died on the evening of September 11, 2024, in his apartment in Moscow from recurrent pneumonia. He had been suffering from brain ischemia.
