= Baji, Georgia =

Baji ბაჯი
- Location within Georgia
- Coordinates: 42°32′44″N 42°57′54″E
- Country: Georgia
- Mkhare: Racha-Lechkhumi and Kvemo Svaneti
- Municipality: Ambrolauri
- Elevation: 620 m (2,030 ft)

Population (2014)
  - Total: 109
- Time zone: UTC+4 (Georgian Time)

Baji (Georgian: ბაჯი) is a village in the Ambrolauri Municipality of Racha-Lechkhumi and Kvemo Svaneti in Georgia. It lies on the Rioni River, and is about 22 kilometres from Ambrolauri.

Yakov Dzhugashvili, Joseph Stalin's eldest son from his first wife Kato Svanidze, was born in Baji in 1907.
