= Galina Dzhugashvili =

Russian translator (1938–2007)

- Born: Galina Yakovlevna Dzhugashvili; 19 February 1938; Moscow, Soviet Union
- Died: 27 August 2007 (aged 69); Burdenko Main Military Clinical Hospital, Moscow
- Resting place: Novodevichy Cemetery
- Other name: Galina Jughashvili
- Education: Moscow State University
- Occupation: Translator
- Employer: Gorky Institute of World Literature
- Parents: Yakov Dzhugashvili (father); Yulia Meltzer (mother)
- Relatives: Joseph Stalin (grandfather)

Galina Yakovlevna Dzhugashvili (Russian: Галина Яковлевна Джугашвили; 19 February 1938 – 27 August 2007) was a Russian translator of French. She was the granddaughter of Joseph Stalin, and the daughter of his elder son, Yakov Dzhugashvili. She consistently challenged widely accepted accounts of her father's internment and death at a Nazi prison camp.

== Biography ==
Galina Dzhugashvili was born in Moscow. Her mother was Yulia Meltzer, a well-known Jewish dancer from Odessa. After meeting Yulia at a reception, Yakov fought with her second husband, an NKVD officer called Nikolai Bessarab, and arranged her divorce. Bessarab was later arrested by the NKVD and executed. Yakov became her third husband.

Yakov was a senior lieutenant in the Soviet artillery in the Second World War. Historians have traditionally maintained that he was captured by the Germans in 1941 and died at the Sachsenhausen concentration camp in 1943 after Stalin declined to exchange him for the captured German general Field Marshal Friedrich Paulus. The United States Defense Department was in possession of documents which indicated that Yakov Dzhugashvili was shot by a concentration camp guard. Although these papers were shown to Galina Dzhugashvili in 2003, she rejected them. She claimed instead that her father was never taken prisoner by the Germans, but rather was killed in battle in 1941. She continuously maintained that any photographs or letters indicating her father was at the prison camp were Nazi propaganda, such as in a June 2006 interview with Komsomolskaya Pravda.

Galina Dzhugashvili studied philology at Moscow State University, and received a doctorate. She was a member of the Russian Writers Union, and worked all her life as a translator of French, mainly for the Gorky Institute of World Literature. She was married to Husein ben Saad, an Algerian mathematician living in exile in Moscow and employed by the United Nations, but kept her maiden name. They had one son, Selim, born on 15 November 1971, who was born deaf.

Dzhugashvili died from cancer at the Burdenko Main Military Clinical Hospital in Moscow, aged 69.
