= Burdenko Main Military Clinical Hospital =

Military hospital in Moscow, Russia

Burdenko Main Military Clinical Hospital Главный военный клинический госпиталь имени Бурденко
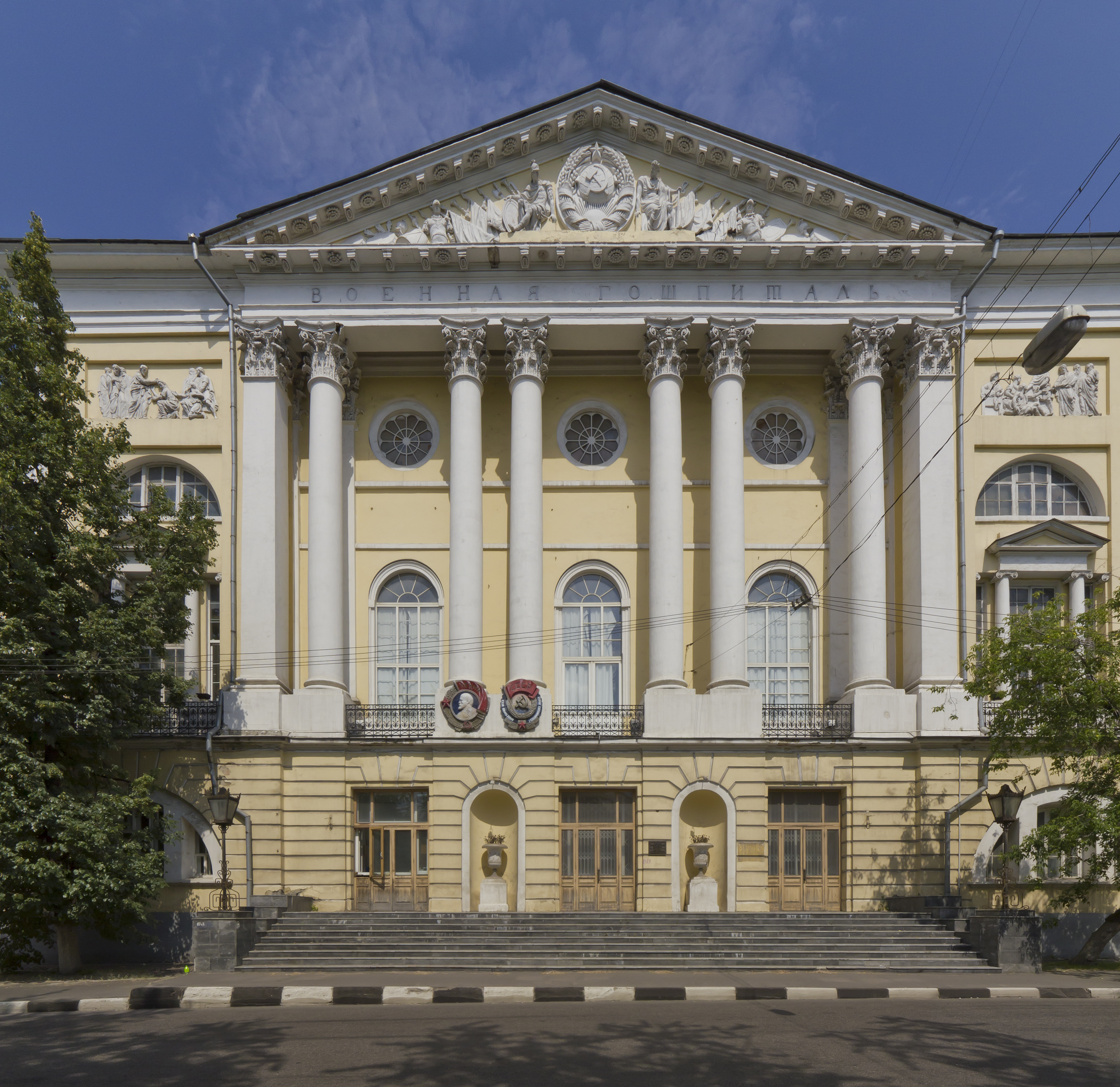
- The hospital building in Lefortovo

Geography
- Location: Moscow, Russia
- Coordinates: 55°46′04″N 37°41′54″E

Organisation
- Type: Military hospital
- Affiliated university: Russian Armed Forces
- Network: Main Military Medical Directorate

Services
- Emergency department: Yes

Helipads
- Helipad: yes

History
- Founded: 25 May 1706

Links
- Website: http://www.gvkg.ru
- Lists: Hospitals in Russia

Nikolay Burdenko Main Military Clinical Hospital (Russian: Главный военный клинический орденов Александра Невского, Ленина и Трудового Красного Знамени госпиталь имени академика Н. Н. Бурденко) is the main military hospital of the Russian Armed Forces. The hospital is located in Moscow and is under the jurisdiction of the Main Military Medical Directorate. It has branches in Balashikha and Sergeyev Posad 6.

== History ==
The hospital ("Military Hospital") was founded on May 25 (June 5), 1706 in Lefortovo by decree of Peter the Great and became the first state medical institution in Russia.

The founder of the hospital (and the first medical school in Russia attached to it) was Nikolai Bidloo who he led the hospital until his death in 1738, a Dutch doctor who had previously been the personal physician of Peter I. It received the first patients on November 21 (December 2), 1707. The first stone building for the hospital was built in 1756.

The main building of the hospital, which has survived to this day, was built in 1798–1802 according to the project of the architect Ivan Egotov In 1756 it was expanded to 1000 seats. From 1707 to 1739, the hospital had three departments, for patients with internal, infectious and external diseases. In 1737–1757, a department for venereal patients, obstetric and surgical departments were opened. There were special rooms for performing operations and an anatomical room where autopsies of the dead were performed. In 1756, the country's first psychiatric department was opened at the hospital. Subsequently, other departments were created in it.

The hospital was actively involved in curing the patients who suffered in the Moscow Plague in 1771. During the French invasion of Russia, the hospital received over 17 thousand wounded and sick, during the Russo-Japanese War of 1904–1905 about 16,000 military personnel and during the First World War more than 376 thousand. In 1917 its name changed to the Moscow General Military Hospital.

During the Great Patriotic War, the hospital continued its active work and was called the Moscow Communist Military Hospital No. 393. In 1946 the hospital was named after N.N Budrenko.

Among others the hospital treated injured soldiers and civilians from The Soviet war in Afghanistan, the earthquake in Armenia, Armenian-Azerbaijan conflict, 2008 Georgian-Russian War and the First and Second Chechen War. as well as Russian soldiers injured during the military intervention in Syria. In February 2003, at the occasion of the Fatherland Defender's Day, President Vladimir Putin made a visit to the hospital. In 2014 Defense Minister Sergey Shoygu made a surprise visit to the hospital where he complained about inefficient management, yet promised to allocate more funds for modernization.

== Operations ==
As institution of the Russian Armed Forces, it plays role to provide and develop specialized military-medical expertise, scientific research in the field of military medicine, training of doctors and medical personnel. In the first decade of the 21st century, the hospital is considered a technically highly equipped multidisciplinary medical institution with 1550 beds, which provides almost all types of specialized medical care. Every year, about 22,000 wounded servicemen and patients are treated in the hospital and more than 9,000 operations are performed. The hospital employs more than 3,500 workers, 800 of them are doctors. It has Eight groups of specialized medical care are in constant readiness at the hospital. The hospital has the largest blood collection and transfusion station in Russia, as well as the only flying Scalpel resuscitation laboratory in the country based on the Il-76 aircraft. The hospital includes five branches in Moscow. From 2010 to 2017 the hospital participated in a research regarding Aortic stenosis.
