= Svetlana Alliluyeva =

Youngest child of Joseph Stalin (1926–2011)

- Светлана Аллилуева; სვეტლანა ალილუევა
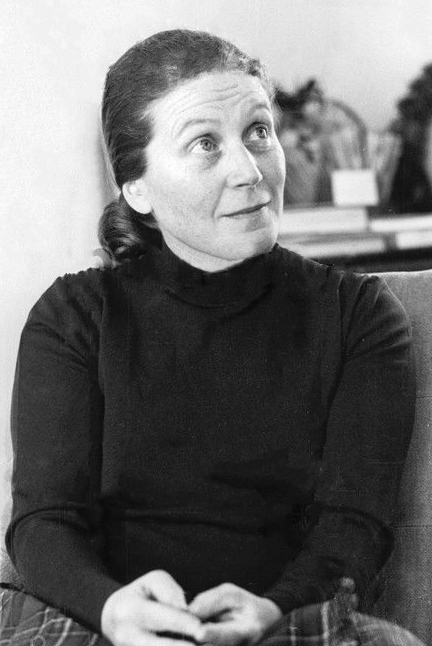
- Alliluyeva in 1970
- Born: Svetlana Iosifovna Stalina; 28 February 1926; Moscow, Russian SFSR, Soviet Union
- Died: 22 November 2011 (aged 85); Richland Center, Wisconsin, U.S.
- Other name: Lana Peters
- Citizenship: Soviet (1926–1967, 1984–1991); Stateless (1967–1978); American (naturalized 1978–1984); British (1992–2011)
- Occupations: Writer and lecturer
- Notable work: Twenty Letters to a Friend (book), Only One Year (book)
- Spouses: Grigory Morozov (m. 1944; div. 1947) Yuri Zhdanov (m. 1949; div. 1952) Ivan Svanidze (m. 1962; div. 1963) Brajesh Singh (m. 1965; died 1966) William Wesley Peters (m. 1970; div. 1973)
- Children: 3, including Joseph
- Parents: Joseph Stalin (father); Nadezhda Alliluyeva (mother)
- Relatives: Vasily Stalin (brother); Yakov Dzhugashvili (half-brother); Artyom Sergeyev (adoptive brother)

Signature
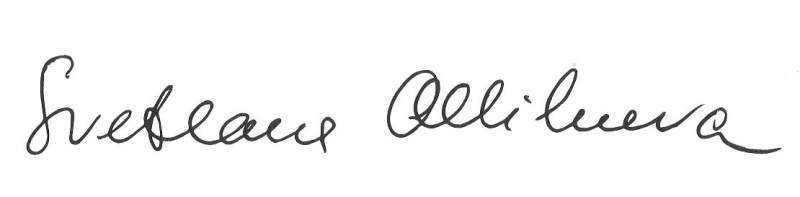

Svetlana Iosifovna Alliluyeva (Note: Russian: Светлана Иосифовна Аллилуева Georgian: სვეტლანა იოსების ასული ალილუევა, romanized: svet'lana iosebis asuli alilueva) (née Stalina; (Note: Russian: Сталина) 28 February 1926 – 22 November 2011), later known as Lana Peters, was the youngest child and only daughter of the Soviet leader Joseph Stalin and his second wife, Nadezhda Alliluyeva.

In 1967, she became an international sensation when she defected to the United States and, in 1978, became a naturalized American citizen. From 1984 to 1986, she briefly returned to the Soviet Union and had her Soviet citizenship reinstated. She was Stalin's last surviving child.

== Early life ==
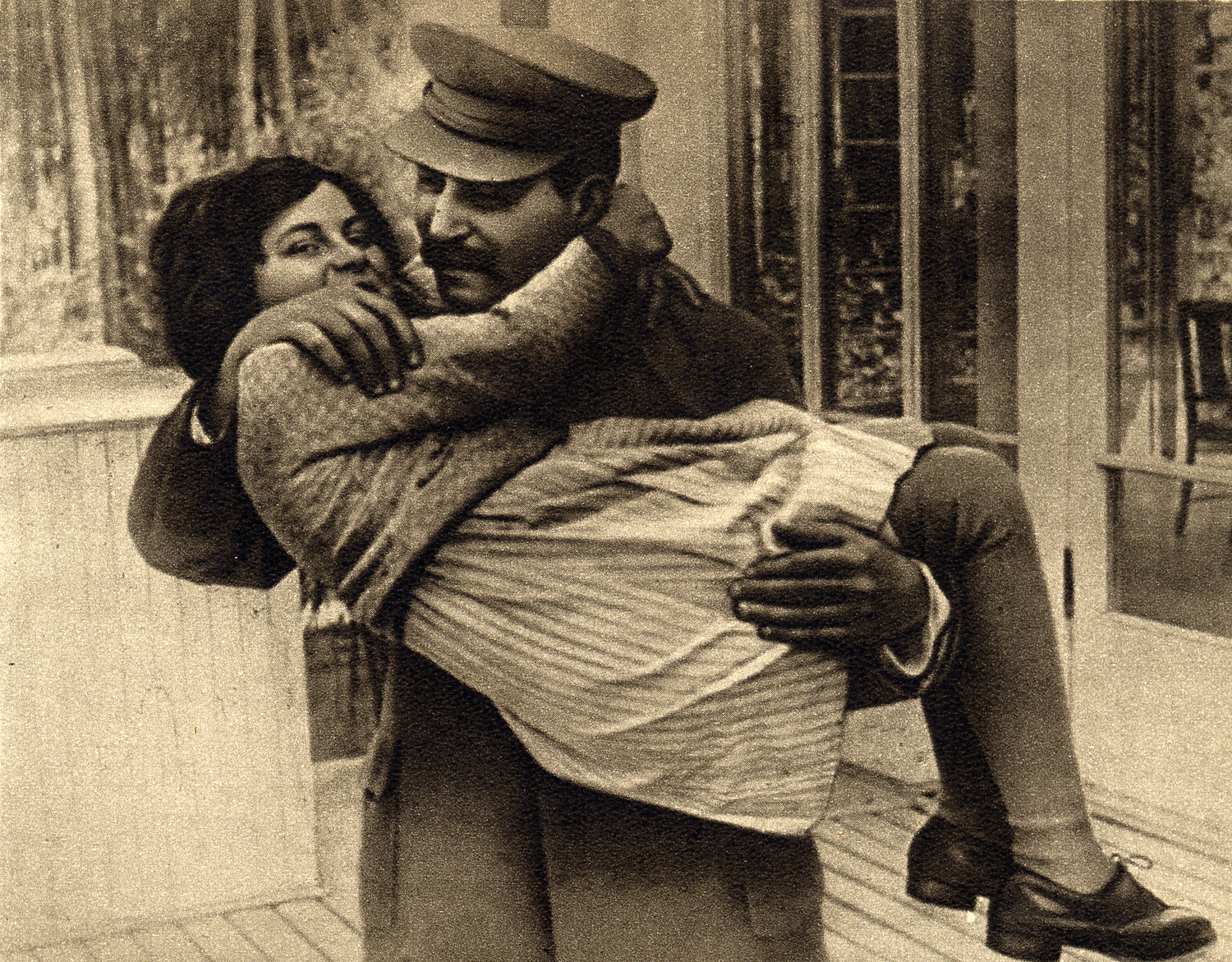
A young Svetlana Stalina being carried by her father in 1935

Svetlana Stalina was born on 28 February 1926. As her mother was interested in pursuing a professional career, Alexandra Bychokova was hired as a nanny to look after Alliluyeva and her older brother Vasily (born 1921). Alliluyeva and Bychokova became quite close, and remained friends for 30 years, until Bychokova died in 1956.

On 9 November 1932, Alliluyeva's mother shot herself. To conceal the suicide, the children were told that she had died of peritonitis, a complication from appendicitis. It would be 10 years before they learnt the truth of their mother's death.

In 1933, Alliluyeva and Vasily began attending Moscow School No. 25; although Vasily was transferred to a new school in 1937, Alliluyeva would stay until 1943, when she graduated from the 10th grade. At the school, Alliluyeva was given no special treatment, and was regarded simply as another student.

Several other relatives of Alliluyeva were killed in the aftermath of the Great Purge, including her aunt Anna, and Anna's husband, Stanislav Redens, who was shot in January 1940.

On 15 August 1942, Winston Churchill saw Alliluyeva in Stalin's private apartments at the Kremlin, describing her as "a handsome red-haired girl, who kissed her father dutifully". Churchill says Stalin "looked at me with a twinkle in his eye as if, so I thought, to convey 'You see, even we Bolsheviks have a family life.' "

At the age of 16, Alliluyeva fell in love with Aleksei Kapler, a Jewish Soviet filmmaker who was 22 years her senior. Her father vehemently disapproved of the relationship and Kapler was sentenced to five years of exile in 1943 in Vorkuta and was then sentenced again in 1948 to five years in labour camps in Inta.

== Marriages ==
Alliluyeva was first married in 1944 to Grigory Morozov, a Jewish student at Moscow University's Institute of International Affairs. Her father did not like Morozov, though he never met him. They had one child, a son named Iosif, who was born in 1945. The couple divorced in 1947, but remained close friends for decades afterwards.

Alliluyeva's second marriage was arranged for her to Yuri Zhdanov, the son of Stalin's right-hand man Andrei Zhdanov and himself one of Stalin's close associates. The couple married early in 1949. Alliluyeva lived with Zhdanov's family at this time, though felt herself dominated by his mother, Zinaida, which was something Stalin had warned her of. Yuri was devoted to Zinaida, and busied himself with Party work, so did not spend a lot of time with Alliluyeva. In 1950, Alliluyeva gave birth to a daughter, Yekaterina. The marriage was dissolved soon afterwards.

In 1962, she married Ivan Svanidze, the nephew of Stalin's first wife, Kato Svanidze, soon after meeting him for the first time since his parents' arrest in 1937. They went against Soviet policy by marrying in a church. Svanidze was not healthy, owing to difficulties of his internal exile in Kazakhstan, and the marriage ended within a year.

From 1970 to 1973, she was married to the American architect William Wesley Peters (a son-in-law of Frank Lloyd Wright), with whom she had a daughter, Olga Peters (later known also as Chrese Evans).

== After Stalin's death ==
After her father's death in 1953, Alliluyeva worked as a lecturer and translator in Moscow. Her training was in History and Political Thought, a subject she was forced to study by her father, although her true passion was literature and writing. In a 2010 interview, she stated that his refusal to let her study arts and his treatment of Kapler were the two times that Stalin had "broken her life", and that he loved her but was "a very simple man - very rude and very cruel." When asked at a New York conference about whether she agreed with her father's rule, she said that she was disapproving of a lot of his decisions but also noted that the responsibility for them also lay with the Communist regime in general.

== Relationship with Brajesh Singh ==
In 1963, while in hospital for a tonsillectomy, Alliluyeva met Kunwar Brajesh Singh, an Indian Communist visiting Moscow. The two fell in love. Singh was mild-mannered and well-educated but gravely ill with bronchiectasis and emphysema. The romance grew deeper and stronger still while the couple were recuperating in Sochi near the Black Sea. Singh returned to Moscow in 1965 to work as a translator, but he and Alliluyeva were not allowed to marry. He died the following year, in 1966. For her first trip outside the Soviet Union, she was allowed to travel to India to take his ashes to his family to pour into the Ganges river. In an interview on 26 April 1967, she referred to Singh as her husband, but also stated that they were never allowed to marry officially.

== Political asylum and later life ==
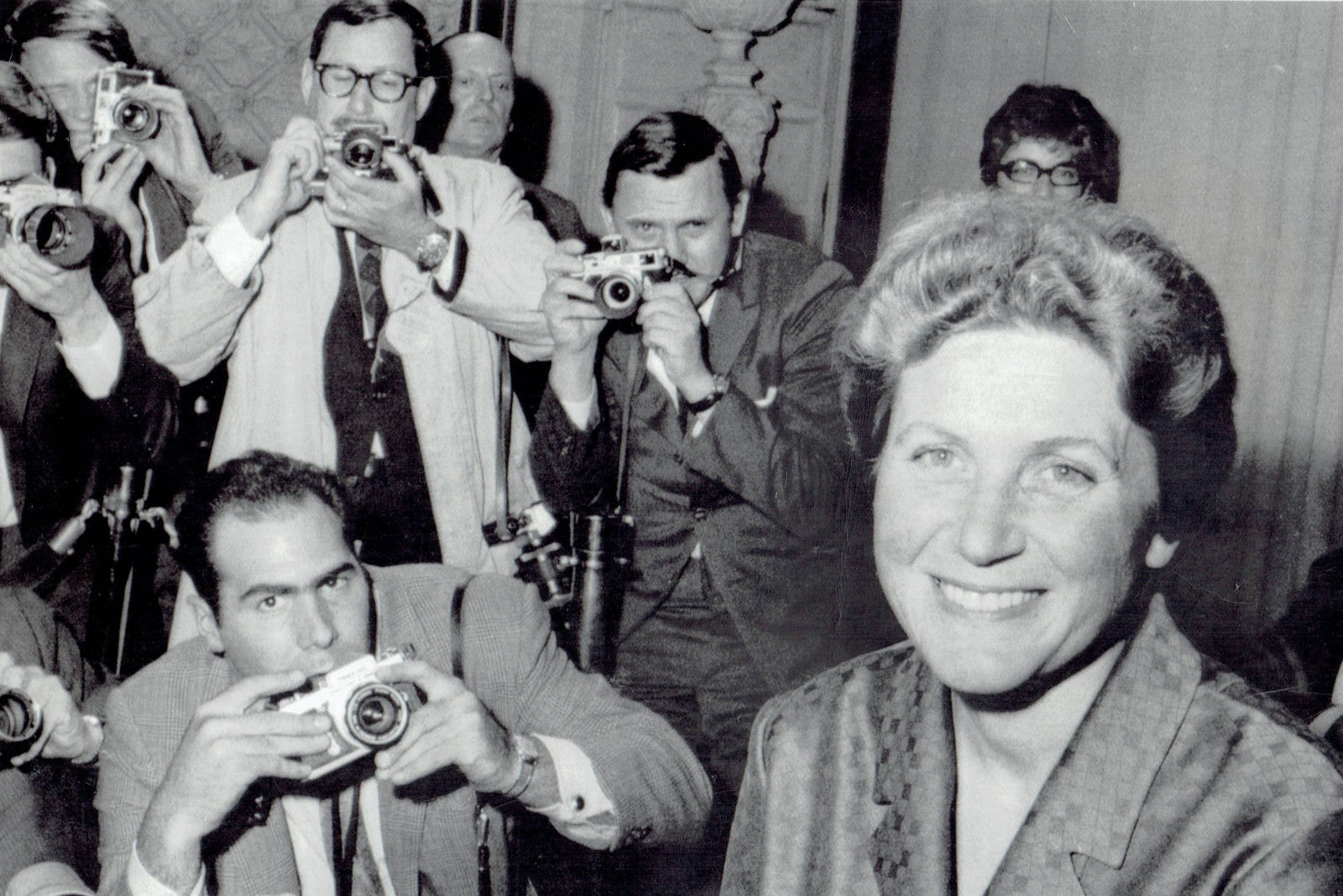
Alliluyeva in 1967

Alliluyeva asked to have official permission to stay in India through the Soviet ambassador, Ivan Benediktov. However, her request was not accepted, and instead, she was ordered to return to the Soviet Union. Then, on 9 March 1967, Alliluyeva approached the United States Embassy in New Delhi. After she stated her desire to defect in writing, the United States ambassador Chester Bowles offered her political asylum and a new life in the United States.

At about nine o’clock p.m. in India, eleven in the morning Washington time, I said, "I have a person here who states she's Stalin's daughter, and we believe she's genuine; unless you instruct me to the contrary, I’m putting her on the one a.m. plane for Rome where we can stop and think the thing through. I’m not giving her any commitment that she can come to the States. I’m only enabling her to leave India, and we will see her to some part of the world—the U.S. or somewhere else—where she can settle in peace. If you disagree with this, let me know before midnight." No comment ever came from Washington. This is one advantage that non-career Ambassadors have; they can go ahead and do unorthodox things without anybody objecting, where a Foreign Service officer might not dare do it. We talked to her and said, "Point number one—are you really sure that you want to leave home? You’ve got a daughter and a son there, and this is a big step to take. Have you really thought it through? You could go back to the Russian embassy right now (she was staying there in their dormitory) and simply go to sleep and forget it, and get up Wednesday morning and on to Moscow, as your schedule calls for." She immediately said, "If this is your decision, I shall go to the press tonight; and announce that (a) democratic India will not take me (they had turned her down prior to her coming) and (b), now democratic America refuses to take me." Well, she didn't need to do it; I was just trying it on for size to be sure she had thought it through. But she was very quick on this.

— Chester Bowles

Alliluyeva accepted. The Indian government feared condemnation by the Soviet Union, so she was immediately sent from India to Rome. When the Qantas flight arrived in Rome, Alliluyeva immediately travelled farther to Geneva, Switzerland, where the government arranged her a tourist visa and accommodation for six weeks. She travelled to the United States, leaving her adult children in the USSR. Upon her arrival in New York City in April 1967, she gave a press conference denouncing her father's legacy and the Soviet government.

After living for several months in Mill Neck, Long Island under US Secret Service protection, Alliluyeva moved to Princeton, New Jersey, where she lectured and wrote, later moving to Pennington, New Jersey, and then to Wisconsin.

In a 2010 interview, she described herself as "quite happy here [in Wisconsin]." Her children who were left behind in the Soviet Union did not maintain contact with her. While Western sources saw a KGB hand behind this, her children claimed that this is because of her complex character. In 1983, after the Soviet government had stopped blocking Alliluyeva's attempts to communicate with her USSR-based children, her son Iosif began to call her regularly and planned to visit her in England, but was refused permission to travel by the Soviet authorities.

She experimented with various religions. Her first book, Twenty Letters to a Friend, caused a worldwide sensation and brought her, some estimate, about US$2,500,000. Alliluyeva herself stated that she gave away much of her book proceeds to charity and by around 1986 had become impoverished, facing debt and failed investments.

In 1970, Alliluyeva answered an invitation from Frank Lloyd Wright's widow, Olgivanna Lloyd Wright, to visit Wright's winter studio, Taliesin West, in Scottsdale, Arizona. In 1978, Alliluyeva became a US citizen as Lana Peters, and in 1982, she moved with her daughter to Cambridge in England, where they shared an apartment near the Cambridge University Botanic Garden.

In October 1984, during a time when Stalin's legacy saw partial rehabilitation in the Soviet Union, she moved back together with her daughter Olga, and both were given Soviet citizenship.

The British journalist Miriam Gross, with whom Alliluyeva conducted her final interview before moving back from England to the Soviet Union in 1984, described Svetlana's increasingly fragile state of mind in a series of letters she wrote to Gross following the interview:

In all of them she is very anxious to explain how, having arrived in the West “blind with admiration for the FREE WORLD”, she had come to believe that the US and the USSR were morally equivalent. She had been convinced that “in the FREE WORLD people are superhuman, wise, enlightened…What a terrible blow it is to find out that…there are just the same idiots, incompetent fools, frightened bureaucrats, confused bosses, paranoid fears of deception and surveillance…this loss of idealism is what happens to defectors only too often. BECAUSE we all relied too much on propaganda.”

In April 1986, she again moved back from the Soviet Union to the US with Olga, and after her return denied anti-Western comments she had made while back in the USSR (including that she had not enjoyed "one single day" of freedom in the West and had been a pet of the Central Intelligence Agency).

Alliluyeva, for the most part, lived the last two years of her life in southern Wisconsin, either in Richland Center or in Spring Green, the location of Wright's summer studio Taliesin. She died on 22 November 2011, from complications arising from colon cancer in Richland Center, where she had spent time while visiting from Cambridge.

Olga Margedant Peters (born 21 May 1971), Alliluyeva's daughter with Peters, now goes by the name Chrese Evans and lives in Portland, Oregon. Her older daughter, Yekaterina, is a volcanologist in Siberia's Kamchatka Peninsula. Alliluyeva's son Iosif, a cardiologist, died in Russia in 2008. Iosif's son Ilya Voznesensky was previously in a relationship with Boris Berezovsky's daughter Elizaveta, with whom he has a son, Savva.

== Religion ==
Alliluyeva was baptised into the Russian Orthodox Church on 20 March 1963. During her years of exile, she experimented with various religions. She then turned to the Eastern Orthodox Church and is also reported to have thought of becoming a nun.

In 1967, Alliluyeva found herself spending time with Catholics in Switzerland and encountered many denominations during her time in the United States. She received a letter from Father Garbolino, an Italian Catholic priest from Pennsylvania, inviting her to make a pilgrimage to Fátima, Portugal, on the occasion of the 50th anniversary of the famous apparitions there. In 1969, Garbolino was in New Jersey and went to visit Alliluyeva at Princeton. In California, she lived with a Catholic couple, Michael and Rose Ginciracusa, for two years (1976–78). She read books by authors such as Raissa Maritain. While living in Cambridge, on 13 December 1982, the feast of Saint Lucy of Syracuse, Alliluyeva converted to Catholicism.

== Works ==
In July 1962, Alliluyeva had met French journalist and first laureate of the International Lenin Peace Prize, Emmanuel d'Astier de La Vigerie, and asked him if anyone would read her memoir. Alliluyeva wrote a memoir in Russian while still in the Soviet Union. The manuscript was carried safely out of the country by T. N. Kaul, Indian Ambassador to the Soviet Union, who returned it to her in New Delhi. Alliluyeva gave her memoir to a CIA agent, Robert Rayle, at the time of her defection. Rayle made a copy of it. It was the only thing other than a few items of clothing taken by Alliluyeva on a secret passenger flight out of India. In 1967, the book was published as Twenty Letters to a Friend ("Dvadtsat' pisem k drugu"). Raymond Pearson, in Russia and Eastern Europe, described Alliluyeva's book as a naïve attempt to shift the blame for Stalinist crimes onto Lavrentiy Beria, and whitewash her father's life.

Her earlier book, Only One Year, describes the events of the year of her defection to the United States.

=== Bibliography ===
- Alliluyeva, Svetlana; Johnson, Priscilla (1967). Twenty Letters to a Friend. London: Hutchinson. ISBN 978-0-06-010099-5 (subscription required)
- Alliluyeva, Svetlana; Chavchavadze, Paul (1969). Only One Year. Harper & Row. ISBN 0-06-010102-4. (subscription required)
- Alliluyeva, Svetlana (1984). Faraway Music. India: Lancer International. ISBN 978-0-8364-1359-5

== In popular culture ==
Alliluyeva was portrayed by Joanna Roth in the HBO's 1992 television film Stalin and Andrea Riseborough in the 2017 satirical film The Death of Stalin.

Alliluyeva is the subject of the 2015 biography Stalin's Daughter: The Extraordinary and Tumultuous Life of Svetlana Alliluyeva by the Canadian writer Rosemary Sullivan.

Alliluyeva is the subject of the 2019 novel The Red Daughter by the American writer John Burnham Schwartz.

Alliluyeva is portrayed by Tamara Greatrex in Howard Brenton's dramatisation of the 1942 Moscow Conference, Churchill in Moscow which premiered at the Orange Tree Theatre in London during February-March 2025 and was streamed via OT on Screen.

== See also ==
- List of Eastern Bloc defectors
- List of people granted political asylum
